= Index of language articles =

This is a partial index of Wikipedia articles treating natural languages, arranged alphabetically and with families mentioned. The list also includes extinct languages.

For a published list of languages, see ISO 639-1 (list of ISO 639 language codes for 136 major languages), or for a more inclusive list, see ISO 639-3 (list of ISO 639-3 codes, 7,874 in total as of June 2013). The enumeration of languages and dialects can easily be taken into the five-digit range; the Linguasphere Observatory has a database (LS-2010) with more than 32,800 coded entries and more than 70,900 linguistic names.

== List of languages ==
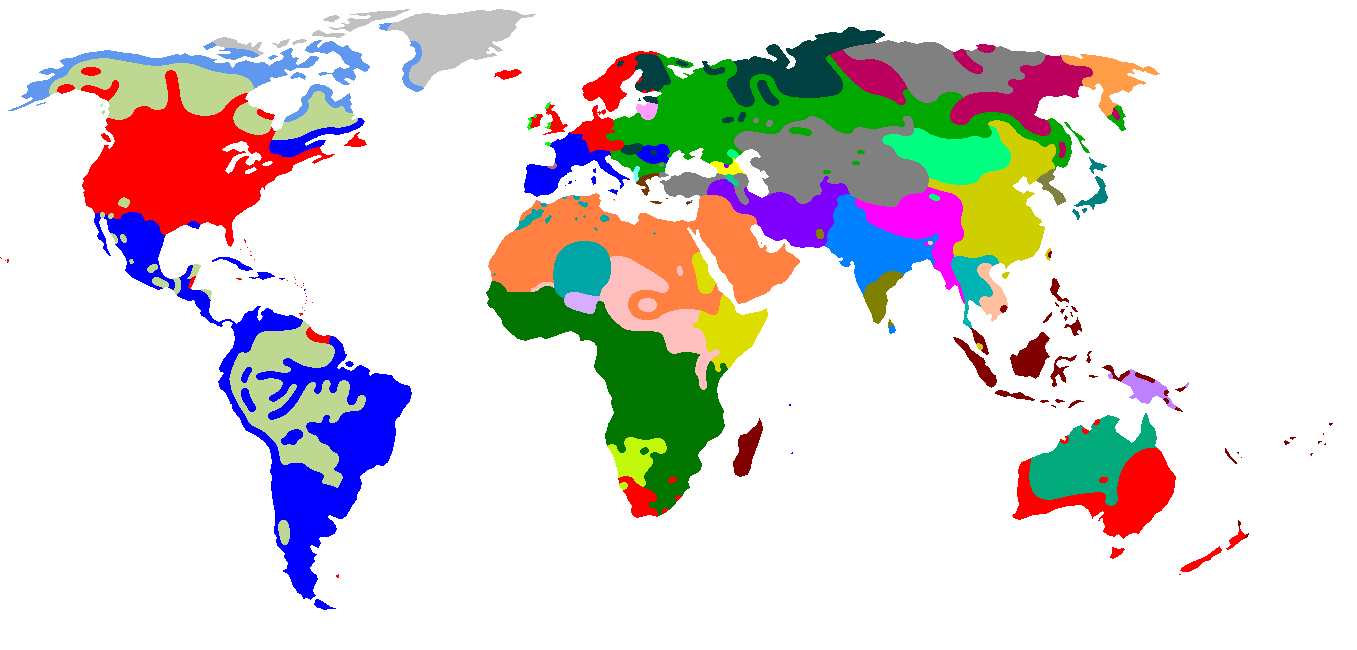

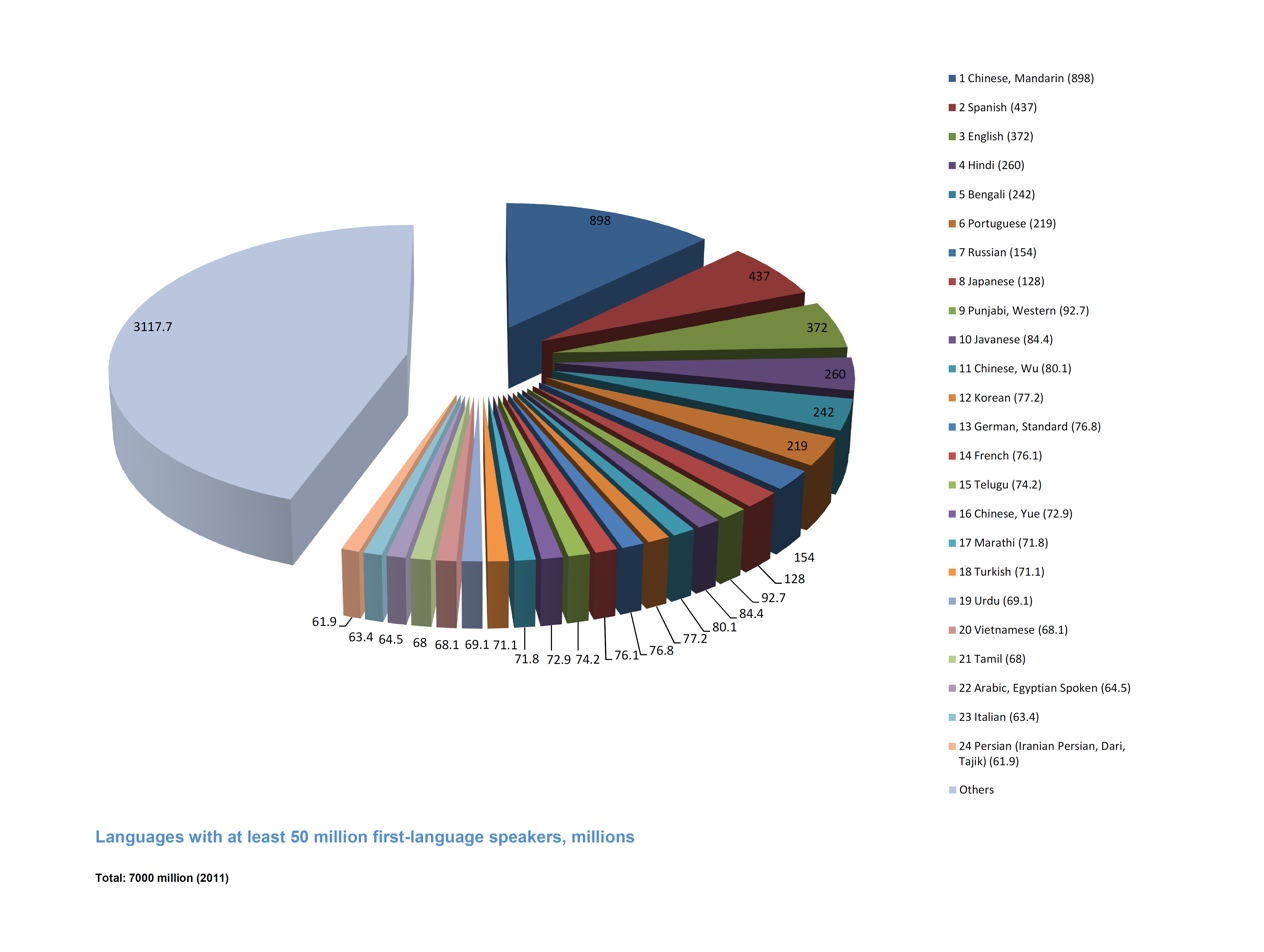
Languages with at least 50 million first-language speakers, millions (according to: Ethnologue)

Afroasiatic languages; Berber languages Chadic languages Cushitic languages Semitic languages Koreanic languages Japonic languages Mongolic languages Tungusic languages Turkic languages	Indigenous languages of the Americas (various families) Australian Aboriginal languages (various families) Austroasiatic languages Austronesian languages Languages of the Caucasus (various families) Dravidian languages Eskaleut languages: Indo-European languages; Albanian language Armenian language Baltic languages Celtic languages Germanic languages Hellenic languages Indo-Aryan languages Iranian languages Romance languages Slavic languages	Khoisan languages (various families) Niger–Congo languages Nilo-Saharan languages (possibly various families) Paleosiberian languages (various families) Papuan languages (various families): Sino-Tibetan languages; Sinitic languages Tibeto-Burman languages Kra–Dai languages Uralic languages Basque language

Language	Group
== A ==
ʼAuhelawa language	Austronesian
Aari	Afroasiatic
AB language	Indo-European
Abau	Sepik
Abawiri	Lakes Plain
Abaza	Northwest Caucasian
Abelam	Sepik
Abellen	Austronesian
Abenaki	Algic
Abkhaz or Abkhazian	Northwest Caucasian
Abu'	Torricelli
Abujmaria or Madiya or Maria	Dravidian
Acehnese	Austronesian
Acholi	Nilo-Saharan
Achumawi	Palaihnihan
Adamorobe Sign Language	Language isolate
Adele	Niger–Congo
Adonara	Austronesian
Adyghe or West Circassian	Northwest Caucasian
Aekyom	Trans–New Guinea
Afar	Afroasiatic
African Romance	Indo-European
Afrikaans	Indo-European
Afro-Seminole Creole	English-based creole
Afshar	Turkic
Agöb	Pahoturi
Aguaruna	Chicham
Ahirwati	Indo-European
Ahom	Kra–Dai
Ai-Cham	Kra–Dai
Aimaq or Barbari	Indo-European
Aimele	Trans–New Guinea
Ainbai	Border
Ainu, Hokkaido	Ainu
Ainu, Kuril	Ainu
Ainu, Sakhalin	Ainu
Ait Seghrouchen Berber	Afroasiatic
Ajawa	Afroasiatic
Ajem-Turkic or Ajami Turkic	Turkic
Aka-Bea	Great Andamanese
Aka-Bo	Great Andamanese
Aka-Cari	Great Andamanese
Aka-Jeru	Great Andamanese
Aka-Kede	Great Andamanese
Aka-Kol	Great Andamanese
Aka-Kora	Great Andamanese
Akan	Niger–Congo
Akar-Bale	Great Andamanese
Akateko	Mayan
Akawaio	Cariban
Akkadian	Afroasiatic
Aklanon	Austronesian
Akoye	Trans–New Guinea
Akpes	Niger–Congo
Alabama	Muskogean
Alanic	Indo-European
Alawa	Arnhem
Albanian	Indo-European
Albanian, Arbëresh	Indo-European
Albanian, Arvanitika or Arvanitic	Indo-European
Albanian, Gheg	Indo-European
Albanian, Tosk	Indo-European
Alchuka	Tungusic
Aleut	Eskaleut
Aleut, Mednyj	Russian and Aleut-based mixed language
Algonquin	Algic
Allentiac	Huarpean
Alorese	Austronesian
Alsatian	Indo-European
Altay	Turkic
Alur	Nilo-Saharan
Alyutor or Alutor	Chukotko-Kamchatkan
Amal	Sepik
Amanab	Border
Ambala	Austronesian
Ambelau	Austronesian
Amdang	Nilo-Saharan
Amdo	Sino-Tibetan
American Sign Language	Francosign
Amharic	Afroasiatic
Amis	Austronesian
ǂ'Amkoe	Kx'a
Ammonite	Afroasiatic
Amorite	Afroasiatic
Amto	Arai–Samaia
Amuzgo	Oto-Manguean
Anamagi	Torricelli
Ancient Belgian	Indo-European
Andio	Austronesian
Andoque	Andoque–Urequena
Anewan	Pama–Nyungan
Angaataha	Trans–New Guinea
Angal	Trans–New Guinea
Angami Naga Sign Language	Language isolate
Angika	Indo-European
Angoram	Ramu–Lower Sepik
Ankave	Trans–New Guinea
Antiguan and Barbudan	English-based creole
Antsi	Austronesian
Anyin	Niger–Congo
Ao	Sino-Tibetan
Apalachee	Muskogean
Apalaí	Cariban
Aquitanian	Basque
Arabana	Pama–Nyungan
Arabela	Zaparoan
Arabic	Afroasiatic
Arabic, Algerian	Afroasiatic
Arabic, Algerian Saharan	Afroasiatic
Arabic, Anatolian	Afroasiatic
Arabic, Andalusian or Andalusi Arabic	Afroasiatic
Arabic, Bahrani	Afroasiatic
Arabic, Bareqi	Afroasiatic
Arabic, Bimbashi or Mongallese	Afroasiatic
Arabic, Central Asian	Afroasiatic
Arabic, Chadian	Afroasiatic
Arabic, Classical	Afroasiatic
Arabic, Cypriot	Afroasiatic
Arabic, Dhofari	Afroasiatic
Arabic, Egyptian	Afroasiatic
Arabic, Gilit	Afroasiatic
Arabic, Gulf	Afroasiatic
Arabic, Hadhrami	Afroasiatic
Arabic, Hassaniya	Afroasiatic
Arabic, Hejazi	Afroasiatic
Arabic, Jebli	Afroasiatic
Arabic, Jijel	Afroasiatic
Arabic, Juba or South Sudanese Arabic	Afroasiatic
Arabic, Judeo-Iraqi or Yahudic	Afroasiatic
Arabic, Judeo-Moroccan	Afroasiatic
Arabic, Judeo-Tripolitanian	Afroasiatic
Arabic, Judeo-Yemeni	Afroasiatic
Arabic, Khuzestani	Afroasiatic
Arabic, Levantine	Afroasiatic
Arabic, Libyan	Afroasiatic
Arabic, Maridi	Afroasiatic
Arabic, Modern Standard	Afroasiatic
Arabic, Moroccan	Afroasiatic
Arabic, Nabataean	Afroasiatic
Arabic, Najdi	Afroasiatic
Arabic, Qeltu or North Mesopotamian Arabic	Afroasiatic
Arabic, Northwest Arabian, Levantine Bedawi Arabic, or Eastern Egyptian Bedawi Arabic	Afroasiatic
Arabic, Nubi or Ki-Nubi	Afroasiatic
Arabic, Omani	Afroasiatic
Arabic, Sanʽani	Afroasiatic
Arabic, Saʽidi	Afroasiatic
Arabic, Shihhi	Afroasiatic
Arabic, Shirvani	Afroasiatic
Arabic, Sicilian or Siculo-Arabic	Afroasiatic
Arabic, Sudanese	Afroasiatic
Arabic, Taʽizzi-Adeni or Southern Yemeni Arabic	Afroasiatic
Arabic, Tihamiyya	Afroasiatic
Arabic, Tunisian	Afroasiatic
Aragonese	Indo-European
Aramaic	Afroasiatic
Arapaso	Tucanoan
Arawak	Arawakan
Are	Austronesian
ꞋAreꞌare	Austronesian
Argentine Sign Language	Unclassified language
Argobba	Afroasiatic
Arin	Yeniseian
Aromanian	Indo-European
Armazic	Afroasiatic
Armenian	Indo-European
Armenian, Eastern	Indo-European
Armenian, Homshetsi	Indo-European
Armenian, Western	Indo-European
Armenian, Zok or Agulis	Indo-European
Armenian Sign Language	Language isolate
Armeno-Kipchak	Turkic
Arrernte, Lower	Pama–Nyungan
Arrernte, Upper	Pama–Nyungan
Aruek	Torricelli
Asa	Afroasiatic
Asaro'o	Trans–New Guinea
Asháninka	Arawakan
Ashkun	Indo-European
Ashokan Prakrit	Indo-European
Asi	Austronesian
Askopan	North Bougainville
Asmat, Casuarina Coast	Trans–New Guinea
Asmat, Central	Trans–New Guinea
Asmat, North	Trans–New Guinea
Assamese	Indo-European
Asturian	Indo-European
Asturleonese	Indo-European
Atadei, East	Austronesian
Atayal	Austronesian
Ateso or Teso	Nilo-Saharan
Ati	Austronesian
Atong Language	Sino-Tibetan
Atorada	Arawakan
Atta	Austronesian
Auslan	BANZSL
Avar	Northeast Caucasian
Avestan	Indo-European
Awadhi	Indo-European
Awara	Trans–New Guinea
Awera	Lakes Plain
Awjila	Afroasiatic
Aymara	Aymaran
Äynu	Turkic
Ayoreo	Zamucoan
Azerbaijani or Azeri	Turkic
== B ==
Babar, North	Austronesian
Babar, Southeast	Austronesian
Babuza	Austronesian
Bactrian	Indo-European
Bada	Austronesian
Badaga	Dravidian
Badeshi	Indo-European
Badjiri	Pama–Nyungan
Badong Yao	Sino-Tibetan
Baekje	Koreanic
Bagri	Indo-European
Bagusa	Foja Range
Bahnar	Austroasiatic
Bahonsuai	Austronesian
Bai	Sino-Tibetan
Bai	Niger–Congo
Bailang	Sino-Tibetan
Bakor	Niger–Congo
Bala	Tungusic
Balaesang	Austronesian
Balanta	Niger–Congo
Balantak	Austronesian
Bali	Niger–Congo languages
Balinese	Austronesian
Balkan Gagauz or Rumelian Turkish	Turkic
Balochi	Indo-European
Balti	Sino-Tibetan
Bamako Sign Language	Language isolate
Bambara or Bamanankan	Niger–Congo
Banda	Austronesian
Banggai	Austronesian
Bangubangu	Niger–Congo
Banjar	Austronesian
Banyumasan	Austronesian
Barakai	Austronesian
Barbareño	Chumashan
Bardi	Nyulnyulan
Bari	Nilo-Saharan
Barranquenho or Barranquenhu	Alentejan Portuguese, Extremaduran Spanish, and Andalusian Spanish-based mixed language
Bartangi	Indo-European
Basaa	Niger–Congo
Basay	Austronesian
Ba–Shu	Sino-Tibetan
Bashkardi	Indo-European
Bashkir	Turkic
Basque or Euskara/Euskera	Language isolate
Batak Karo	Austronesian
Batak Toba	Austronesian
Bats	Northeast Caucasian
Batui	Austronesian
Batuley	Austronesian
Bauzi	East Geelvink Bay
Bavarian	Indo-European
Bawean and Bawean Creole	Austronesian
Bedamuni	Trans–New Guinea
Beeke	Niger–Congo
Behoa	Austronesian
Beja	Afroasiatic
Belarusian	Indo-European
Belhare	Sino-Tibetan
Beli	Torricelli
Bemba	Niger–Congo
Bembe	Niger–Congo
Bena	Niger–Congo
Bengali	Indo-European
Benggoi	Austronesian
Berber	Afroasiatic
Berbey Sign Language	Language isolate
Berta	Nilo-Saharan
Berti	Nilo-Saharan
Betawi	Austronesian
Bete	Niger–Congo
Bété	Niger–Congo
Beurla Reagaird	Indo-European
Bezhta	Northeast Caucasian
Bhele	Niger–Congo
Bhili	Indo-European
Bhojpuri	Indo-European
Bhutanese Sign Language	Unclassified language
Biao	Kra–Dai
Bidhawal	Pama–Nyungan
Bigambal	Pama–Nyungan
Bijago	Niger–Congo
Bijil Neo-Aramaic	Afroasiatic
Bikol	Austronesian
Bikya or Furu	Niger–Congo
Bila	Niger–Congo
Bile	Niger–Congo
Bilua	Central Solomon
Bima	Austronesian
Bindal	Pama–Nyunga
Bininj Kunwok	Arnhem
Bira	Niger–Congo
Birgid	Nilo-Saharan
Biseni	Niger–Congo
Bislama	English-based creole
Bissa	Niger–Congo
Blaan	Austronesian
Blackfoot	Algic
Bobongko	Austronesian
Bobot	Austronesian
Bodo	Niger–Congo
Bogaya	Trans–New Guinea
Boguru	Niger–Congo
Boholano	Austronesian
Bohtan Neo-Aramaic	Afroasiatic
Boiken	Sepik
Bolano	Austronesian
Bolinao	Austronesian
Bonan or Paoan	Mongolic
Bondei	Niger–Congo
Bonerate	Austronesian
Bonkiman	Trans–New Guinea
Bora	Boran
Boro	Sino-Tibetan
Borong	Trans–New Guinea
Bororo	Bororoan
Boruca	Chibchan
Bosnian	Indo-European
Botolan	Austronesian
Bouakako Sign Language	Language isolate
Bo-Ung	Trans–New Guinea
Brahui	Dravidian
Brazilian Sign Language	Language isolate
Breton	Indo-European
Bribri	Chibchan
British Sign Language	BANZSL
Bru	Austroasiatic
Bua	Niger–Congo
Budu	Niger–Congo
Buginese	Austronesian
Buglere	Chibchan
Bukiyip	Torricelli
Bukusu	Niger–Congo
Bukwen	Niger–Congo
Bulgar	Turkic
Bulgarian	Indo-European
Bulgarian, Banat	Indo-European
Bulgebi	Trans–New Guinea
Bumbita	Torricelli
Bung	Niger–Congo
Bungandidj	Pama–Nyungan
Bungku	Austronesian
Bungu	Niger–Congo
Bunjevac	Indo-European
Bunun	Austronesian
Burmese	Sino-Tibetan
Buru	Austronesian
Buru–Angwe	Niger–Congo
Burushaski	Language isolate
Buruwai	Trans–New Guinea
Buryat	Mongolic
Busoa	Austronesian
Butonese	Austronesian
Buyeo	Koreanic
Buyu	Niger–Congo
== C ==
Caluyanon or Caluyanun	Austronesian
Cameroonian Pidgin English	English-based creole
Camfranglais	Cameroonian French, Cameroonian English, and Cameroonian Pidgin English-based mixed language
Canaano-Akkadian	Akkadian and Amarna Canaanite-based mixed language
Cao Miao	Kra–Dai
Cape Verdean Creole or Kabuverdianu	Portuguese-based creole
Carabayo	Ticuna–Yuri
Carib	Cariban
Carrier or Dakelh	Na-Dene
Catacao	Catacaoan
Catalan	Indo-European
Catalan Sign Language	Catalan Sign
Caucasian Sign Language	Language isolate
Cavineña	Tacanan
Cayuga	Iroquoian
Cebuano	Austronesian
Celtiberian	Indo-European
Central Italian	Indo-European
Central Taurus Sign Language	Language isolate
Chabacano or Chavacano	Spanish-based creole
Chadong	Kra–Dai
Chaga or Kichagga	Niger–Congo
Chaga, Central	Niger–Congo
Chagatai	Turkic
Chaga, West	Niger–Congo
Chaharmahali Turkic	Turkic
Chakavian	Indo-European
Chakma	Indo-European
Cham	Austronesian
Chamacoco	Zamucoan
Chambir	Ramu–Lower Sepik
Chamorro or Chamoru	Austronesian
Chaná	Charruan
Chaouia or Tachawit	Afroasiatic
Chatino	Oto-Manguean
Chayahuita	Cahuapanan
Chechen	Northeast Caucasian
Chelkan	Turkic
Chenchu	Dravidian
Chenoua	Afroasiatic
Cherokee	Iroquoian
Cheyenne	Algic
Chhattisgarhi	Indo-European
Chichimeca Jonaz	Oto-Manguean
Chickasaw	Muskogean
Chiga or Kiga	Niger–Congo
Chilcotin or Tsilhqot'in	Na-Dene
Chilean Sign Language	Unclassified language
Chinantec	Oto-Manguean
Chinese	Sino-Tibetan
Chinese, Standard	Sino-Tibetan
Chinese Kyakala	Tungusic
Chinese Sign Language	Chinese Sign
Chintang or Chhintang	Sino-Tibetan
Chiricahua or Mescalero-Chiricahua Apache	Na-Dene
Chichewa or Nyanja	Niger–Congo
Chimané or Tsimané or Mosetén	Language isolate
Chipaya	Uru-Chipaya
Chipewyan	Na-Dene
Chiquimulilla	Xincan
Chiquitano	Language isolate
Chittagonian	Indo-European
Chocho or Chocholtec	Oto-Manguean
Choctaw	Muskogean
Ch'ol	Mayan
Cholón	Hibito–Cholon
Chontal de Tabasco	Mayan
Chonyi	Niger–Congo
Chorasmian or Khwarezmian	Indo-European
Christian Palestinian Aramaic	Afroasiatic
Chuave	Trans–New Guinea
Chuj	Mayan
Chukchi or Chukot	Chukotko-Kamchatkan
Chulym	Turkic
Chulym, Lower	Turkic
Chung	Niger–Congo
Church Slavonic	Indo-European
Chuukese or Trukese	Austronesian
Chuvan	Yukaghir
Chuvash	Turkic
Citak	Trans–New Guinea
Cochin Portuguese Creole or Vypin Indo-Portuguese	Portuguese-based creole
Cocoma or Cocama	Tupian
Coconucan	Barbacoan
Cocopah	Yuman–Cochimí
Coeur d'Alene	Salishan
Comanche	Uto-Aztecan
Comecrudo	Pakawan
Comorian	Niger–Congo
Coptic	Afroasiatic
Cora	Uto-Aztecan
Cornish	Indo-European
Corsican	Indo-European
Cree	Algic
Cree, East or James Bay Cree	Algic
Cree, Moose	Algic
Cree, Plains	Algic
Cree, Swampy	Algic
Cree, Woods or Woodland Cree	Algic
Crimean Tatar	Turkic
Croatian	Indo-European
Croatian, Burgenland	Indo-European
Cuban Sign Language	Unclassified language
Cubeo	Tucanoan
Cuicatec	Oto-Manguean
Cuman	Turkic
Cumbric	Indo-European
Cuyonon	Austronesian
Czech	Indo-European
== D ==
Daats'iin	Nilo-Saharan
Dadanitic	Afroasiatic
Dagaare	Niger–Congo
Dagbani	Niger–Congo
Dahlik	Afroasiatic
Dai	Austronesian
Daka	Niger–Congo
Dalecarlian	Indo-European
Dalmatian	Indo-European
Damal	Trans–New Guinea
Dameli	Indo-European
Dampelas	Austronesian
Danish	Indo-European
Danish, East	Indo-European
Danzhou	Sino–Tibetan
Dao	Sino-Tibetan
Dargin	Northeast Caucasian
Dari or Dari Persian	Indo-European
Daur or Dagur	Mongolic
Dawera-Daweloor	Austronesian
Daylami	Indo-European
Dazaga	Nilo-Saharan
Dedua	Trans–New Guinea
Defaka	Niger–Congo
Degenan	Trans–New Guinea
Dem	Trans–New Guinea
Dena'ina or Tanaina	Na-Dene
Dendi	Nilo-Saharan
Denya	Niger–Congo
Dera	Senagi
Dhanggati	Pama–Nyungan
Dhatki	Indo-European
Dhauwurd Wurrung	Pama–Nyungan
Dhivehi or Maldivian	Indo-European
Dholuo	Nilo-Saharan
Dhundhari	Indo-European
Dhuwal	Pama–Nyungan
Dibiyaso	Trans–New Guinea
Dicamay Agta	Austronesian
Dida	Niger–Congo
Digo	Niger–Congo
Dinka	Nilo-Saharan
Dioula or Jula	Niger–Congo
Diyari	Pama–Nyungan
Djabwurrung	Pama–Nyungan
Dobel	Austronesian
Doe	Niger–Congo
Dogri	Indo-European
Dogrib or Tli Cho	Na-Dene
Dolgan	Turkic
Dom	Trans–New Guinea
Domaaki or Dumaki	Indo-European
Domung	Trans–New Guinea
Dondo	Austronesian
Dong	Niger–Congo
Dongxiang or Santa	Mongolic
Douentza Sign Language	Language isolate
Duala	Niger–Congo
Dukhan	Turkic
Dulbu	Niger–Congo
Duna	Trans–New Guinea
Dura	Sino-Tibetan
Duruwa or Parji	Dravidian
Dutch	Indo-European
Dyirbal	Pama–Nyungan
Dzhidi or Judeo-Persian	Indo-European
Dzongkha	Sino-Tibetan
Dzubukuá	Kariri
== E ==
Eastern Middle Atlas Berber	Afroasiatic
Eblaite	Afroasiatic
Edolo	Trans–New Guinea
Edomite	Afroasiatic
Egyptian	Afroasiatic
Egyptian Sign Language	Arab Sign
Eitiep	Torricelli
Ekari	Trans–New Guinea
Ekoti	Niger–Congo
Elamite	Afroasiatic
Emem	Pauwasi
Emplawas	Austronesian
Enawené-Nawé	Arawakan
Ende	Austronesian
Enets or Yenisey Samoyed	Uralic
Enga	Trans–New Guinea
English	Indo-European
English, Euro	Indo-European
English, International	Indo-European
English, Northern	Indo-European
English, Northumbrian	Indo-European
Enlhet	Mascoian
Enya	Niger–Congo
Erzya	Uralic
Ese Ejja	Tacanan
Estonian	Uralic
Estonian, Northeastern Coastal	Uralic
Estonian, South	Uralic
Esuma	Niger–Congo
Etruscan	Tyrsenian
Even	Tungusic
Evenk or Evenki	Tungusic
Ewe	Niger–Congo
Extremaduran	Indo-European
Extreme Southern Italian	Indo-European
== F ==
Faetar or Faetar–Cigliàje	Indo-European
Faifi	Afroasiatic
Fali of Baissa	Niger–Congo
Faliscan	Indo-European
Fam	Niger–Congo
Fang	Niger–Congo
Faroese	Indo-European
Fas	Fas
Favorlang	Austronesian
Fembe	Trans–New Guinea
Fergana Kipchak	Turkic
Fijian	Austronesian
Filipino	Austronesian
Finland-Swedish Sign Language	Swedish Sign
Finnish	Uralic
Finnish Sign Language	Swedish Sign
Finongan	Trans–New Guinea
Fiwaga	Trans–New Guinea
Flemish	Indo-European
Flemish, East	Indo-European
Flemish, French	Indo-European
Flemish, West	Indo-European
Flinders Island	Pama–Nyungan
Foi	Trans–New Guinea
Foodo	Niger–Congo
Fon	Niger–Congo
Forak	Trans–New Guinea
Fox	Algic
Franco-Italian	Gallo-Italic, Venetian, and Oïl-based mixed language
Franco-Provençal or Arpitan	Indo-European
French	Indo-European
French, Louisiana	Indo-European
French Sign Language	Francosign
Frisian, East	Indo-European
Frisian, Hindeloopen	Indo-European
Frisian, North	Indo-European
Frisian, Saterland	Indo-European
Frisian, Schiermonnikoog	Indo-European
Frisian, Terschelling	Indo-European
Frisian, West or West Lauwers Frisian	Indo-European
Friulian	Indo-European
Fula, Fulfulde, or Fulani	Niger–Congo
Fur	Nilo-Saharan
Futop	Niger–Congo
Futunan	Austronesian
Futuna-Aniwa	Austronesian
Fuyu Kyrgyz	Turkic
== G ==
Ga	Niger–Congo
Gãã	Niger–Congo
Gaagudju	Arnhem
Gadaba	Dravidian
Gagauz	Turkic
Galatian	Indo-European
Galela	West Papuan
Galician	Indo-European
Galindian	Indo-European
Gallaecian	Indo-European
Gallurese	Indo-European
Gan	Sino-Tibetan
Ganda	Niger–Congo
Gangte	Sino-Tibetan
Gardiol	Indo-European
Garhwali	Indo-European
Garifuna	Arawakan
Garrwa	Garrwan
Gaulish	Indo-European
Gaulish, Cisalpine	Indo-European
Gawar-Bati or Gowari or Narsati	Indo-European
Gaya	Unclassified language
Gayo	Austronesian
Ge'ez	Afroasiatic
Gelao	Kra–Dai
Gen or Gẽ or Mina	Niger–Congo
Georgian	Kartvelian
German	Indo-European
German Sign Language	DGSic
Geser	Austronesian
Ghadamès	Afroasiatic
Gikuyu or Kikuyu	Niger–Congo
Gilbertese or Kiribati	Austronesian
Gilaki	Indo-European
Gira	Trans–New Guinea
Giryama	Niger–Congo
Githabul	Pama–Nyungan
Gitxsan	Tsimshianic
Goaria	Indo-European
Gobasi	Trans–New Guinea
Gogo	Niger–Congo
Goguryeo	Koreanic
Golin	Trans–New Guinea
Gondi	Dravidian
Gora or Gorani	Indo-European
Goral	Indo-European
Gorani or Hawrami	Indo-European
Gothic	Indo-European
Greenlandic or Kalaallisut	Eskaleut
Greenlandic Norse	Indo-European
Greek	Indo-European
Greek, Aeolic	Indo-European
Greek, Apulian or Griko	Indo-European
Greek, Ancient Macedonian	Indo-European
Greek, Arcadocypriot	Indo-European
Greek, Attic	Indo-European
Greek, Byzantine or Medieval Greek	Indo-European
Greek, Calabrian	Indo-European
Greek, Cappadocian	Indo-European
Greek, Cypriot	Indo-European
Greek, Doric or West Greek	Indo-European
Greek, Homeric or Epic Greek	Indo-European
Greek, Ionic	Indo-European
Greek, Italiot	Indo-European
Greek, Jewish Koine	Indo-European
Greek, Koine	Indo-European
Greek, Mariupolitan or Crimean Greek	Indo-European
Greek, Mycenaean	Indo-European
Greek, Pamphylian	Indo-European
Greek, Pontic	Indo-European
Greek, Tsakonian	Indo-European
Greek, Yevanic	Indo-European
Greek Slavic	Indo-European
Guahibo	Guajiboan
Guanche	Afroasiatic
Guaraní	Tupian
Guaruyu	Tupian
Guaymí	Chibchan
Guazacapán	Xincan
Guinea-Bissau Creole	Portuguese-based creole
Gujarati	Indo-European
Gujari	Indo-European
Gula Iro or Kulaal	Niger–Congo
Gullah or Sea Island Creole English	English-based creole
Gumuz	Nilo-Saharan
Gunaikurnai	Pama–Nyungan
Gungu	Niger–Congo
Guniyandi	Bunuban
Guriaso	Senu River
Gusii	Niger–Congo
Guugu Yimithirr	Pama–Nyunga
Guwar	Pama–Nyungan
Guya	Trans–New Guinea
Guyanese Sign Language	Unclassified language
Gwa	Niger–Congo
Gwahatike	Trans–New Guinea
Gweno	Niger–Congo
Gwere	Niger–Congo
Gwichʼin	Na-Dene
== H ==
Hachijō or shima kotoba	Japonic
Hadramautic	Afroasiatic
Hadza or Hatsa	Language isolate
Haida or Masset	Language isolate
Haitian Creole	French-based creole
Hakka	Sino-Tibetan
Halcnovian or Alzenau	Indo-European
Hamtai	Trans–New Guinea
Hän	Na-Dene
Hani	Sino-Tibetan
Hanis	Coosan
Harákmbut	Harákmbut–Katukinan
Harappan	Unclassified language
Harari	Afroasiatic
Harauti	Indo-European
Harsusi	Afroasiatic
Haryanvi	Indo-European
Harzani	Indo-European
Hasaitic	Afroasiatic
Hattic	Unclassified language
Hausa	Afroasiatic
Havasupai or Upland Yuman	Yuman–Cochimí
Hawaiian	Austronesian
Hawaiʻi Sign Language	Language isolate or small language family
Haya	Niger–Congo
Hazaragi	Indo-European
Hebrew	Afroasiatic
Hebrew, Ashkenazi	Afroasiatic
Hebrew, Biblical	Afroasiatic
Hebrew, Italian	Afroasiatic
Hebrew, Medieval	Afroasiatic
Hebrew, Mishnaic	Afroasiatic
Hebrew, Mizrahi	Afroasiatic
Hebrew, Modern	Afroasiatic
Hebrew, Samaritan	Afroasiatic
Hebrew, Sephardi	Afroasiatic
Hebrew, Tiberian	Afroasiatic
Hebrew, Yemenite	Afroasiatic
Hehe	Niger–Congo
Heiban	Niger–Congo
Hema	Niger–Congo
Herero	Niger–Congo
Hértevin	Afroasiatic
Hezhou	Uyghur and Mandarin-based mixed language
Highland Oaxaca Chontal	Tequistlatecan
Hiligaynon	Austronesian
Himyaritic	Afroasiatic
Hindi	Indo-European
Hindko	Indo-European
Hindustani	Indo-European
Hinukh	Northeast Caucasian
Hiri Motu	Motu-based pidgin
Hismaic	Afroasiatic
Hittite	Indo-European
Hixkaryana	Cariban
Hlai	Kra–Dai
Hmong	Hmong–Mien
Hmu	Hmong–Mien
Ho	Austroasiatic
Hobyót	Afroasiatic
Ho-Chunk	Siouan
Holoholo	Niger–Congo
Holu	Niger–Congo
Homa	Niger–Congo
Hopi	Uto-Aztecan
Hoti	Austronesian
Huamelultec	Tequistlatecan
Huastec or Teenek	Mayan
Huaulu	Austronesian
Huave	Language isolate
Huichol	Uto-Aztecan
Huiliche	Araucanian
Huizhou	Sino-Tibetan
Hulaulá	Afroasiatic
Huli	Trans–New Guinea
Humburi Senni	Nilo-Saharan
Hungana	Niger–Congo
Hungarian	Uralic
Hunnic	Unclassified language
Hup	Nadahup
Hurrian	Hurro-Urartian
Hutterisch or Tirolean	Indo-European
Hwa miao	Hmong–Mien
== I ==
Iau	Lakes Plain
Ibembe	Niger–Congo
Ibibio	Niger–Congo
Iban	Austronesian
Ibanag	Austronesian
Icelandic	Indo-European
Idaxo-Isuxa-Tiriki	Niger–Congo
Ifè	Niger–Congo
Igbo or Ibo or Biafra	Niger–Congo
Ik	Nilo-Saharan
Ikalanga or Kalanga	Niger–Congo
Ikizu	Niger–Congo
Ikoma-Nata-Isenye	Niger–Congo
Ile Ape	Austronesian
Ili Turki	Turkic
Illyrian	Indo-European
Ilokano or Ilocano	Austronesian
Ilwana	Niger–Congo
Imroing	Austronesian
Inabaknon Language	Austronesian
Indi	Austronesian
Indonesian	Austronesian
Indo-Portuguese Creole of Bombay	Portuguese-based creole
Ingrian or Izhorian	Uralic
Ingush	Northeast Caucasian
Inuktitut	Eskaleut
Inupiaq	Eskaleut
Inuvialuktun	Eskaleut
Ipili	Trans–New Guinea
Iramba	Niger–Congo
Iraqw	Afroasiatic
Irish or Irish Gaelic	Indo-European
Irish Sign Language	Francosign
Irula	Dravidian
Isan or Northeastern Thai	Kra–Dai
Isanzu	Niger–Congo
Ishkashimi or Ishkashmi	Indo-European
Isirawa	Foja Range
Israeli Sign Language	DGSic
Istriot	Indo-European
Istro-Romanian	Indo-European
Italian	Indo-European
Italian Sign Language	Francosign
Italo-Paulista	Neapolitan, Venetian, and Caipira Portuguese-based pidgin
Ivatan	Austronesian
Iwam	Sepik
Iyo	Trans–New Guinea
Izon	Niger–Congo
== J ==
Jagham	Niger–Congo
Jacaltek, Jakalteko or Popti'	Mayan
Jalaa	Unclassified language, possibly Niger–Congo
Jamaican Patois	English-based creole
Jandai	Pama–Nyungan
Japanese	Japonic
Japanese Sign Language	Japanese Sign
Japhug	Sino-Tibetan
Jaqaru	Aymaran
Jarai	Austronesian
Jarawa	Ongan
Javanese	Austronesian
Jê	Macro-Jê
Jeju	Koreanic
Jemez or Towa	Tanoan–Kiowa
Jewish Babylonian Aramaic	Afroasiatic
Jewish Neo-Aramaic dialect of Zakho	Afroasiatic
Jhar or Jarawa	Niger–Congo
Jiamao	Kra–Dai
Jibbali or Shehri	Afroasiatic
Jicarilla	Na-Dene
Jie	Yeniseian
Jin	Sino-Tibetan
Jirajara	Jirajaran
Jita	Niger–Congo
Juang	Austroasiatic
Judeo-Georgian	Kartvelian
Jumaytepeque	Xincan
Junjiahua	Sino–Tibetan
Jurchen	Tungusic
== K ==
Kaʼapor Sign Language	Language isolate
Kaaps	Indo-European
Kabardian	Northwest Caucasian
Kabiye	Niger–Congo
Kabwa	Niger–Congo
Kabyle	Afroasiatic
Kachin or Jingpo	Sino-Tibetan
Kagulu	Niger–Congo
Kahe	Niger–Congo
Kaiku	Niger–Congo
Kaili	Austronesian
Kaimbulawa	Austronesian
Kaingáng	Macro-Jê
Kaiwá	Tupian
Kajkavian	Indo-European
Kajuk	Niger–Congo
Kaki Ae	Language isolate
Kalabari	Niger–Congo
Kala Lagaw Ya	Pama–Nyungan
Kalami or Gawri or Dirwali	Indo-European
Kalao	Austronesian
Kalahsa-mun	Indo-European
Kalašma	Indo-European
Kalinago	Arawakan
Kalkatungu	Pama–Nyungan
Kallawaya	Puquina and Quechuan-based mixed language
Kalmyk	Mongolic
Kalto or Nahali	Indo-European
Kaluli	Trans–New Guinea
Kam	Kra–Dai
Kamaru	Austronesian
Kamasa	Trans–New Guinea
Kamassian	Uralic
Kamba	Niger–Congo
Kamberau	Trans–New Guinea
Kambot	Ramu–Lower Sepik
Kamchadal, Eastern	Chukotko-Kamchatkan
Kamchadal, Southern	Chukotko-Kamchatkan
Kamchadal, Western or Itelmen	Chukotko-Kamchatkan
Kangjia	Mongolic
Kami	Niger–Congo
Kamoro	Trans–New Guinea
Kamtapuri or Rangpuri or Rajbongshi	Indo-European
Kanakanavu	Austronesian
Kandawo	Trans–New Guinea
Kanembu	Nilo-Saharan
Kang	Kra–Dai
Kankanaey	Austronesian
Kannada	Dravidian
Kanuri	Nilo-Saharan
Kanuri, Bilma	Nilo-Saharan
Kanuri, Central	Nilo-Saharan
Kanuri, Manga	Nilo-Saharan
Kanuri, Tumari	Nilo-Saharan
Kaonde or Chikaonde	Niger–Congo
Kapampangan	Austronesian
Karachay–Balkar	Turkic
Karagas or Tofa	Turkic
Karaim	Turkic
Karakalpak	Turkic
Karawari or Tabriak	Ramu–Lower Sepik
Karelian	Uralic
Karen	Sino-Tibetan
Karey	Austronesian
Kari	Niger–Congo
Karkar	Pauwasi
Kasabe	Niger–Congo
Kashaya	Pomoan
Kashmiri	Indo-European
Kashubian	Indo-European
Kasiguranin or Casiguran	Austronesian
Kasua	Trans–New Guinea
Kâte	Trans–New Guinea
Katla	Niger–Congo
Kaugel	Trans–New Guinea
Kaure	Kaure–Kosare
Kauwera	Foja Range
Kavalan	Austronesian
Kawacha	Trans–New Guinea
Kawésqar or Alacaluf	Alacalufan
Kazakh	Turkic
Kedang	Austronesian
Kelantan Peranakan Hokkien	Hokkien, Southern Thai, and Kelantan Malay-based mixed language
Kemedzung	Niger–Congo
Kendem	Niger–Congo
Kenyang	Niger–Congo
Kenyan Sign Language	Kenyan–Somali Sign
Kéo	Austronesian
Keoru	Trans–New Guinea
Kepo'	Austronesian
Kerek	Chukotko-Kamchatkan
Keres or Keresan	Language isolate or small language family
Kerewe	Niger–Congo
Ket	Yeniseian
Ketangalan or Luilang	Austronesian
Kewa	Trans–New Guinea
Khakas	Turkic
Khalaj	Turkic
Kham or Sheshi	Sino-Tibetan
Khamnigan Mongol	Mongolic
Khamyang	Kra–Dai
Khandeshi	Indo-European
Khanty or Ostyak	Uralic
Khasi	Austroasiatic
Khayo	Niger–Congo
Khazar	Turkic
Khitan	Mongolic
Khmer	Austroasiatic
Khmu	Austroasiatic
Khoekhoe	Khoe–Kwadi
Khorasani Turkic	Turkic
Khowar	Indo-European
Kibala	Niger–Congo
K'iche'	Mayan
Kiembu or Embu	Niger–Congo
Kija	Jarrakan
Kili	Tungusic
Kilmeri	Border
Kiluba	Niger–Congo
Kimatuumbi	Niger–Congo
Kimbu	Niger–Congo
Kimbundu	Niger–Congo
Kinaray-a or Hiraya	Austronesian
Kinga	Niger–Congo
Kinyarwanda	Niger–Congo
Kipsigis	Nilo-Saharan
Kirombo	Niger–Congo
Kirundi	Niger–Congo
Kisi	Niger–Congo
Kivunjo	Niger–Congo
Klallam or Clallam	Salishan
Klata	Austronesian
Knaanic	Indo-European
Ko or Fungor	Niger–Congo
Koalib	Niger–Congo
Koasati or Coushatta	Muskogean
Koba	Austronesian
Kobo	Niger–Congo
Kodava or Kodagu or Coorgi	Dravidian
Kodeoha	Austronesian
Kohistani or Khili	Indo-European
Kokoda	Trans–New Guinea
Kola	Austronesian
Kolami	Dravidian
Kombio	Torricelli
Komi or Komi-Zyrian	Uralic
Komo (Bantu)	Niger–Congo
Konai	Trans–New Guinea
Konkani	Indo-European
Kongo or Kikongo	Niger–Congo
Konkow	Maiduan
Konongo–Ruwila	Niger–Congo
Konzo or Konjo	Niger–Congo
Kopar	Ramu–Lower Sepik
Koraga	Dravidian
Korandje	Nilo-Saharan
Korean	Koreanic
Korku	Austroasiatic
Korowai	Trans–New Guinea
Korwa	Austroasiatic
Koryak	Chukotko-Kamchatkan
Kosraean	Austronesian
Kota	Dravidian
Koyraboro Senni	Nilo-Saharan
Koyra Chiini or Western Songhay	Nilo-Saharan
Koy Sanjaq Christian Neo-Aramaic	Afroasiatic
Koya	Dravidian
Krymchak or Judeo-Crimean Tatar	Turkic
Kubo	Trans–New Guinea
Kui	Dravidian
Kujarge	Unclassified language, perhaps Afroasiatic
Kukkuzi	Uralic
Kulina	Arawan
Kulisusu	Austronesian
Kulon	Austronesian
Kulung (Jarawan)	Niger–Congo
Kuman	Trans–New Guinea
Kumandin	Turkic
Kumauni	Indo-European
Kumbainggar or Gumbaynggirr	Pama–Nyungan
Kumbewaha	Austronesian
Kumeyaay or Kumiai	Yuman–Cochimí
Kumyk	Turkic
Kumzari	Indo-European
!Kung	Kxʼa
Kungarakany	Arnhem
Kungkari	Pama–Nyungan
Kunyi	Niger–Congo
Kurbet	Domari and Cypriot Turkish-based creole
Kurdish	Indo-European
Kurdish, Abduyi	Indo-European
Kurdish, Central or Sorani	Indo-European
Kurdish, Laki	Indo-European
Kurdish, Northern or Kurmanji	Indo-European
Kurdish, Southern	Indo-European
Kuria	Niger–Congo
Kurukh or Kurux	Dravidian
Kusunda	Language isolate
Kutenai or Kootenay or Ktunaxa	Language isolate
Kutong	Trans–New Guinea
Kutu	Niger–Congo
Kuy	Austroasiatic
Kven	Uralic
Kwak'wala	Wakashan
Kwamba or Amba	Niger–Congo
Kwanja	Niger–Congo
Kwanyama or Ovambo	Niger–Congo
Kwaya	Niger–Congo
Kwerba	Foja Range
Kwerba Mamberamo	Foja Range
Kwere	Niger–Congo
Kxoe	Khoe–Kwadi
Kyaka	Trans–New Guinea
Kyrgyz or Kirghiz	Turkic
== L ==
Laal	Unclassified language
Labir	Niger–Congo
Lacandon	Mayan
Lach	Indo-European
Ladakhi	Sino-Tibetan
Ladin	Indo-European
Ladino or Judeo-Spanish	Indo-European
Laeko	Torricelli
Laiyolo	Austronesian
Lak	Northeast Caucasian
Lakota or Teton	Siouan
Lama	Sino-Tibetan
Lamaholot	Austronesian
Lamalera	Austronesian
Lamatuka	Austronesian
Lambadi, Lamani, or Banjari	Indo-European
Lame	Niger–Congo
Lango	Nilo-Saharan
Lao or Laotian	Kra–Dai
Laragiya	Limilngan-Wulna
Lardil	Tangkic
Larestani	Indo-European
Laro	Niger–Congo
Lasalimu	Austronesian
Latin	Indo-European
Latin, British	Indo-European
Latin, Pannonian	Indo-European
Latgalian	Indo-European
Latvian	Indo-European
Lauje	Austronesian
Laz or Lazuri	Kartvelian
Lega	Niger–Congo
Lembena	Trans–New Guinea
Lemko	Indo-European
Lenca, Honduran	Lencan
Lenca, Salvadoran	Lencan
Lengola	Niger–Congo
Leonese	Indo-European
Lepontic	Indo-European
Levuka	Austronesian
Lewo Eleng	Austronesian
Lewotobi	Austronesian
Lezgi or Agul	Northeast Caucasian
Liabuku	Austronesian
Liana	Austronesian
Ligbi or Ligby	Niger–Congo
Lika	Niger–Congo
Limburgish	Indo-European
Lingala	Niger–Congo
Lio	Austronesian
Lipan	Na-Dene
Lisan al-Dawat	Indo-European
Lisela	Austronesian
Lishanid Noshan or Lishana Didan	Afroasiatic
Lithuanian	Indo-European
Livonian or Liv	Uralic
Livvi-Karelian, Olonets Karelian, or Livvi	Uralic
Lobala or Bala	Niger–Congo
Logol	Niger–Congo
Logooli	Niger–Congo
Lola	Austronesian
Loloda	West Papuan
Lomavren	Lom and Armenian-based mixed language
Lombard	Indo-European
Lorang	Austronesian
Lotha	Sino-Tibetan
Low Alemannic German	Indo-European
Low German	Indo-European
Lower Sorbian	Indo-European
Lozi or Silozi	Niger–Congo
Ludic or Ludian	Uralic
Lugbara	Nilo-Saharan
Luguru	Niger–Congo
Luhya	Niger–Congo
Lunda or Chilunda	Niger–Congo
Luri	Indo-European
Lushootseed	Salishan
Lusitanian	Indo-European
Lusoga or Soga	Niger–Congo
Luvale	Niger–Congo
Luwati	Indo-European
Luxembourgish	Indo-European
== M ==
Maasai	Nilo-Saharan
Macedonian	Indo-European
Macedonian Sign Language	Unclassified language
Machiguenga	Arawakan
Macuna	Tucanoan
Madí or Jamamadí or Kapaná	Arauan
Madurese	Austronesian
Magadhi	Indo-European
Magoma	Niger–Congo
Maguindanao	Austronesian
Mai Chinese	Sino-Tibetan
Mairasi	Mairasi
Maithili	Indo-European
Mak	Kra–Dai
Makasae	Trans–New Guinea
Makasar	Austronesian
Makhuwa or Makua	Niger–Congo
Makhuwa-Meetto	Niger–Congo
Makwe	Niger–Congo
Malagasy	Austronesian
Malak-Malak	Language isolate
Malawian Sign Language	Unclassified language
Malay	Austronesian
Malay, Brunei	Austronesian
Malayalam	Dravidian
Malaysian Sign Language	Francosign
Maltese or Maltese Arabic	Afroasiatic
Malto or Sauria Paharia	Dravidian
Malvi, Malavi, or Ujjaini	Indo-European
Mam	Mayan
Mama	Niger–Congo
Mamaa	Trans–New Guinea
Ma Manda	Trans–New Guinea
Mambila	Niger–Congo
Mamluk-Kipchak	Turkic
Manchu	Tungusic
Mandaic	Afroasiatic
Mandarin	Sino-Tibetan
Mandarin, Dungan	Sino-Tibetan
Mandarin, Gangou	Sino-Tibetan
Mandarin, Sichuanese	Sino–Tibetan
Mandarin, Taz	Sino-Tibetan
Mandinka	Niger–Congo
Mangarrayi	Arnhem
Manggarai	Austronesian
Manipa	Austronesian
Manombai	Austronesian
Mansi or Vogul	Uralic
Manta	Niger–Congo
Manusela	Austronesian
Manx	Indo-European
Manyika	Niger–Congo
Maojia	Sino-Tibetan
Maonan	Kra–Dai
Māori	Austronesian
Mape	Trans–New Guinea
Mapoyo	Cariban
Mapudungun or Mapuche	Araucanian
Maquiritari or Ye'kuana	Cariban
Marachi	Niger–Congo
Maranao	Austronesian
Marathi	Indo-European
Marcho-Magdeburgian	Indo-European
Mardin Sign Language	Language isolate
Mari or Cheremis	Uralic
Mari, Hill	Uralic
Mari, Meadow	Uralic
Mari, Northwestern	Uralic
Maria	Dravidian
Marimanindji	Western Daly
Maring	Trans–New Guinea
Mariri	Austronesian
Mariveleño	Austronesian
Marquesan	Austronesian
Marranj	Western Daly
Marrgu	Marrku–Wurrugu
Marshallese or Ebon	Austronesian
Martha's Vineyard Sign Language	Language isolate
Marwari	Indo-European
Masaba	Niger–Congo
Masbatenyo or Minasbate	Austronesian
Masela	Austronesian
Mashi	Niger–Congo
Masiwang	Austronesian
Masurian	Indo-European
Matagi	Japanese-based Cant
Matngele	Eastern Daly
Mattokki	Nilo-Saharan
Mauritian Creole or Morisyen	French-based creole
Maung	Iwaidjan
Mawayana or Mapidian	Arawakan
Mayan Sign Language	Language isolate or small language family
Mayo	Uto-Aztecan
Mazandarani or Tabari	Indo-European
Mazahua	Oto-Manguean
Mazatec	Oto-Manguean
Mbala	Niger–Congo
Mbe	Niger–Congo
Mbo	Niger–Congo
Mbole	Niger–Congo
Mbonga	Niger–Congo
Mbongno	Niger–Congo
Mbre or Pɛrɛ	Niger–Congo
Mbugwe	Niger–Congo
Mbuk	Niger–Congo
Mbula-Bwazza	Niger–Congo
Meänkieli or Tornedalian Finnish	Uralic
Mebu	Trans–New Guinea
Median	Indo-European
Megleno-Romanian	Indo-European
Megrelian or Mingrelian	Kartvelian
Mehri or Mahri	Afroasiatic
Meitei or Manipuri or Meithei	Sino-Tibetan
Melpa	Trans–New Guinea
Menominee	Algic
Mentawai	Austronesian
Menya	Trans–New Guinea
Meriam	Eastern Trans-Fly
Meroitic	Unclassified language, maybe Nilo-Saharan or Language isolate
Meru or Kimeru	Niger–Congo
Merya	Uralic
Mescalero	Na-Dene
Messapic	Indo-European
Mewari	Indo-European
Mewati	Indo-European
Michif	Métis French and Plains Cree-based mixed language
Miji	Mijiic
Mijikenda	Niger–Congo
Mikarew	Ramu–Lower Sepik
Mikasuki or Miccosukee	Muskogean
Mi'kmaq or Micmac	Algic
Minaean	Afroasiatic
Minakyesu or Bati	Austronesian
Minangkabau	Austronesian
Min	Sino-Tibetan
Min, Central	Sino-Tibetan
Min, Datian	Sino-Tibetan
Min, Eastern	Sino-Tibetan
Min, Fuzhou	Sino–Tibetan
Min, Hainan	Sino-Tibetan
Min, Haklau	Sino-Tibetan
Min, Hokkien	Sino-Tibetan
Min, Leizhou	Sino-Tibetan
Min, Longdu	Sino-Tibetan
Min, Longyan	Sino-Tibetan
Min, Nanlang	Sino-Tibetan
Min, Northern	Sino-Tibetan
Min, Pu–Xian	Sino-Tibetan
Min, Quanzhou	Sino-Tibetan
Min, Sanxiang	Sino-Tibetan
Min, Shao–Jiang	Sino-Tibetan
Min, Southern	Sino-Tibetan
Min, Taiwanese Hokkien	Sino-Tibetan
Min, Teochew	Sino-Tibetan
Mingar	Austronesian
Minica Huitoto	Witotoan
Minjiang	Sino–Tibetan
Mirandese	Indo-European
Miriti	Tucanoan
Miskito or Miskitu	Misumalpan
Mithaka	Pama–Nyungan
Mituku	Niger–Congo
Mixe	Mixe–Zoque
Mixtec	Oto-Manguean
Mizo	Sino-Tibetan
Mnong or M'Nong	Austroasiatic
Mobilian Jargon	Choctaw and French-based pidgin
Modole	West Papuan
Moghol	Mongolic
Mohawk	Iroquoian
Mojave	Yuman–Cochimí
Moksela	Austronesian
Moksha	Uralic
Molengue	Niger–Congo
Moma	Austronesian
Mon	Austroasiatic
Middle Mongol	Mongolic
Mongolian	Mongolic
Mongolian, Alasha	Mongolic
Mongolian, Classical	Mongolic
Mongolian, Khalkha	Mongolic
Mongolian, Peripheral or Inner Mongolian	Mongolic
Mono	Niger–Congo
Mono	Uto-Aztecan
Mono	Austronesian
Montagnais or Innu	Algic
Montenegrin	Indo-European
Mopan	Mayan
Mori Atas	Austronesian
Mori Bawah	Austronesian
Moriori	Austronesian
Moro	Niger–Congo
Moronene	Austronesian
Motu	Austronesian
Moxo	Arawakan
Mozambican Sign Language	Unclassified language
Mozarabic or Andalusi Romance	Indo-European
Mpinda	Niger–Congo
Mufian	Torricelli
Muher	Afroasiatic
Muna	Austronesian
Mundari	Austroasiatic
Mundugumor	Yuat
Mundurukú	Tupian
Mungkip	Trans–New Guinea
Munji	Indo-European
Muong	Austroasiatic
Muratayak	Trans–New Guinea
Muria	Dravidian
Murrinh-patha	Southern Daly
Muscogee or Creek	Muskogean
Musi	Austronesian
Mutumui	Pama–Nyungan
Mvanip	Niger–Congo
Mwani	Niger–Congo
== N ==
Naami or Bebe	Niger–Congo
Nafaanra	Niger–Congo
Nafusi	Afroasiatic
Nagarchal	Dravidian
Nagumi	Niger–Congo
Nahuatl	Uto-Aztecan
Nakama	Trans–New Guinea
Naki	Niger–Congo
Nama	Yam
Namat	Yam
Nambikwara	Nambikwaran
Nambo-Namna	Yam
Namibian Sign Language	Language isolate
Namo	Yam
Nanai	Tungusic
Nande	Niger–Congo
Nankina	Trans–New Guinea
Napu	Austronesian
Nara	Nilo-Saharan
Narak	Trans–New Guinea
Nauruan	Austronesian
Navajo or Navaho	Na-Dene
Ndaka	Niger–Congo
Ndamba	Niger–Congo
Ndau or Southeast Shona	Niger–Congo
Nde-Nsele-Nta	Niger–Congo
Ndoe	Niger–Congo
Ndombe	Niger–Congo
Ndonga	Niger–Congo
Ndoola or Njoyamɛ	Niger–Congo
Ndunda	Niger–Congo
Neapolitan	Indo-European
Negidal	Tungusic
Nek	Trans–New Guinea
Nekgini	Trans–New Guinea
Neko	Trans–New Guinea
Nema	Trans–New Guinea
Nenets or Yurak	Uralic
Nete	Trans–New Guinea
Nepal Bhasa or Newari	Sino-Tibetan
Nepali	Indo-European
New Zealand Sign Language	BANZSL
Nez Perce	Sahaptian
Ngad'a	Austronesian
Ngaing	Trans–New Guinea
Ngambay	Nilo-Saharan
Ngamini	Pama–Nyungan
Nganasan or Tavgi	Uralic
Ngarinyin	Worrorran
Ngbee	Niger–Congo
Ngbinda	Niger–Congo
Ngoreme	Niger–Congo
Ngulu	Niger–Congo
Ngumba	Niger–Congo
Nheengatu or Geral or Modern Tupí	Tupian
Nias	Austronesian
Nicaraguan Sign Language	Language isolate
Niellim	Niger–Congo
Nigerian Pidgin	English-based pidgin
Nihali or Nahali	Language isolate
Nii	Trans–New Guinea
Nimadi	Indo-European
Nimi	Trans–New Guinea
Nisenan	Maiduan
Nisga'a	Tsimshianic
Niuean or Niue	Austronesian
Nivkh or Gilyak	Language isolate
Nizaa	Niger–Congo
Njerep	Niger–Congo
Nkem-Nkum	Niger–Congo
N'Ko	Niger–Congo
Nkoroo	Niger–Congo
Nnam	Niger–Congo
Nogai	Turkic
Nomane	Trans–New Guinea
Noni	Niger–Congo
Norfuk or Norfolk	Cant, English-Tahitian based
Noric	Indo-European
Norman or Norman-French	Indo-European
Norn	Indo-European
Northern Altai	Turkic
Northern Emberá	Chocoan
Northeast Malakula	Austronesian
Northern Ndebele	Niger–Congo
Northern Paiute	Uto-Aztecan
Northern Sotho or Sepedi	Niger–Congo
Northern Straits Salish	Salishan
Norwegian (Bokmål, Nynorsk, Riksmål)	Indo-European
Nǀu	Tuu
Nuer	Nilo-Saharan
Nuk	Trans–New Guinea
Nukak	Nukak-Kakwa
Nukna	Trans–New Guinea
Numanggang	Trans–New Guinea
Nunukul	Pama–Nyungan
Nuu-chah-nulth	Wakashan
Nuxálk or Bella Coola	Salishan
Nyabwa	Niger–Congo
Nyah Kur	Austroasiatic
Nyali	Niger–Congo
Nyambo	Niger–Congo
Nyamwezi	Niger–Congo
Nyanga	Niger–Congo
Nyanga-li	Niger–Congo
Nyang'i	Nilo-Saharan
Nyangumarta	Pama–Nyungan
Nyaturu	Niger–Congo
Nyawaygi	Pama–Nyungan
Nyole (Kenya)	Niger–Congo
Nyole (Uganda)	Niger–Congo
Nyoro	Niger–Congo
== O ==
Occitan or Provençal	Indo-European
Odia	Indo-European
Odki or Od	Indo-European
Odoodee	Trans–New Guinea
Oirat	Mongolic
Ojibwe, Ojibwa, or Chippewa	Algic
Okinawan	Japonic
Okodia	Niger–Congo
Oko-Juwoi	Great Andamanese
Old Leonese or Medieval Leonese	Indo-European
Old Prussian	Indo-European
Olunyole or Nyole	Niger–Congo
Omagua	Tupian
Omok	Yukaghir
Oneida	Iroquoian
Ongota	Unclassified language
Onobasulu	Trans–New Guinea
O'odham	Uto-Aztecan
Opao	Trans–New Guinea
Ormuri	Indo-European
Oroch	Tungusic
Orok	Tungusic
Orokolo	Trans–New Guinea
Oromo or Afaan Oromoo	Afroasiatic
Oroqen	Tungusic
Oruma	Niger–Congo
Oscan	Indo-European
Ossetian or Ossetic	Indo-European
Ossetian, Digor	Indo-European
Ossetian, Jassic or Jasz	Indo-European
Ossetian, Iron	Indo-European
Otomaco	Otomákoan
Otoro	Niger–Congo
Ottoman Sign Language	Language isolates
Övdalian	Indo-European
== P ==
Paakantyi	Pama–Nyungan
Padoe	Austronesian
Páez or Nasa Yuwe	Language isolate
Pagu	West Papuan
Paiwan	Austronesian
Palauan	Austronesian
Pali	Indo-European
Palikúr	Arawakan
Palu'e	Austronesian
Pame	Oto-Manguean
Pamona	Austronesian
Pancana	Austronesian
Pangasinan	Austronesian
Pangwa	Niger–Congo
Papiamento or Papiamentu	Portuguese-based creole
Papora-Hoanya	Austronesian
Parachi	Indo-European
Paraujano	Arawakan
Pare	Niger–Congo
Paredarerme	Eastern Tasmanian
Parkari Koli	Indo-European
Parthian	Indo-European
Parya	Indo-European
Pashto, Pushto, or Pashtu	Indo-European
Patwin	Wintuan
Pawnee	Caddoan
Paya or Pech	Chibchan
Pazeh	Austronesian
Pecheneg	Turkic
Peerapper	Western Tasmanian
Pei	Sepik
Pemon	Cariban
Pémono	Cariban
Pendau	Austronesian
Peninsular Japonic	Japonic
Pennsylvania Dutch or Pennsylvania German	Indo-European
Persian or farsi, as it is referred to in the Persian language	Indo-European
Persian Kowli	Indo-European
Phalura	Indo-European
Phoenician	Afroasiatic
Phuthi	Niger–Congo
Piaroa	Piaroa–Saliban
Picard	Indo-European
Pictish	Indo-European
Pimpama	Pama–Nyungan
Ping	Sino–Tibetan
Pipil or Nawat	Uto-Aztecan
Pirahã	Mura
Pirriya	Pama–Nyungan
Pitta Pitta	Pama–Nyungan
Plains Miwok	Utian
Plautdietsch or Mennonite Low German	Indo-European
Podlachian or Podlashuk	Indo-European
Pogolo	Niger–Congo
Pokomo	Niger–Congo
Polabian	Indo-European
Polish	Indo-European
Polish Sign Language	Unclassified language
Pomak	Indo-European
Pomeranian	Indo-European
Popoloca	Oto-Manguean
Portuguese	Indo-European
Portuguese Sign Language	Swedish Sign
Pothohari or Pahari-Potwari	Indo-European
Pradhan or Pardhan	Dravidian
Pre-Samnite	Indo-European
Pucikwar	Great Andamanese
Puelche	Chonan
Puma	Sino-Tibetan
Punic, Phoenicio-Punic, or Carthaginian	Afroasiatic
Punjabi, Panjabi, or Gurmukhi	Indo-European
Purari	Trans–New Guinea
Purépecha or Tarascan	Language isolate
Puri	Purian
Puyuma	Austronesian
== Q ==
Q'anjob'al	Mayan
Qaqet	Baining
Qashqai or Ghashghai	Turkic
Qatabanian	Afroasiatic
Qahveh Khaneh Sign Language	Language isolate
Q'eqchí	Mayan
Qoqmončaq	Kazakh, Mongolian, and Evenki-based mixed language
Quebec Sign Language	Francosign
Quechua	Quechuan
Quechua, Ancash	Quechuan
Quechua, Huallaga	Quechuan
Quechua, North Junín	Quechuan
Quechua, Pacaraos	Quechuan
Quecha, Wanka	Quechuan
Quechua, Yaru	Quechuan
Quechua, Yauyos–Chincha	Quechuan
Quelia	German and Russian-based mixed language
Quileute	Chimakuan
== R ==
Rahambuu	Austronesian
Rajasthani	Indo-European
Rajong	Austronesian
Rampi	Austronesian
Rangi	Niger–Congo
Rani	Indo-European
Ratagnon, Datagnon, or Latagnun	Austronesian
Rawa	Trans–New Guinea
Razi	Indo-European
Razihi	Afroasiatic
Regi or Kara	Niger–Congo
Rembong	Austronesian
Remontado Dumagat	Austronesian
Resian	Indo-European
Réunion Creole or Bourbonnais	French-based creole
Rijāl Almaʿ	Afroasiatic
Riung	Austronesian
Romanian	Indo-European
Romansh	Indo-European
Romani	Indo-European
Romani, Balkan	Indo-European
Romani, Baltic	Indo-European
Romani, Bohemian	Indo-European
Romani, Carpathian	Indo-European
Romani, Early	Indo-European
Romani, English	English and British Romani-based mixed language
Romani, Erromintxela	Basque and Kalderash Romani-based mixed language
Romani, Finnish	Indo-European
Romani, Greek	Greek and Romani-based mixed language
Romani, Iberian or Caló	Iberian Romance and Romani-based mixed language
Romani, Kalderash	Indo-European
Romani, Laiuse	Estonian and Finnish Romani-based mixed language
Romani, Rumelian	Indo-European
Romani, Scandinavian	North Germanic and Romani-based mixed language
Romani, Scottish	Scots and British Romani-based mixed language
Romani, Serbian	Serbian and Romani-based mixed language
Romani, Sinte	Indo-European
Romani, Vlax	Indo-European
Romani, Welsh	Indo-European
Romani, Zargari	Indo-European
Romblomanon	Austronesian
Rombo	Niger–Congo
Rongga	Austronesian
Rotokas	North Bougainville
Rotuman	Austronesian
Rouran	Mongolic
Rukai	Austronesian
Runyankole language or Nyankore	Niger–Congo
Rusa	Niger–Congo
Russian	Indo-European
Russian, Alaskan	Indo-European
Russian, Odesan	Indo-European
Russian Sign Language	Francosign
Rusyn, Carpathian	Indo-European
Rusyn, Pannonian	Indo-European
Rutul	Northeast Caucasian
Ruthenian	Indo-European
Ruuli	Niger–Congo
== S ==
Saari	Niger–Congo
Saaroa	Austronesian
Sabaic or Sabaean	Afroasiatic
Safaitic	Afroasiatic
Safeyoka	Trans–New Guinea
Sagalla	Niger–Congo
Saisiyat	Austronesian
Sakizaya	Austronesian
Salar	Turkic
Salas	Austronesian
Saluan	Austronesian
Samaritan Aramaic	Afroasiatic
Sambal	Austronesian
Samberigi	Trans–New Guinea
Sámi, Akkala	Uralic
Sámi, Inari	Uralic
Sámi, Kainuu	Uralic
Sámi, Kemi	Uralic
Sámi, Kildin	Uralic
Sámi, Lule	Uralic
Sámi, Northern	Uralic
Sámi, Pite	Uralic
Sámi, Skolt	Uralic
Sámi, Southern	Uralic
Sámi, Ter	Uralic
Sámi, Ume	Uralic
Samia	Niger–Congo
Samo	Trans–New Guinea
Samoan	Austronesian
Samoan Sign Language	BANZSL
Sandawe	Language isolate
Sango	Ngbandi-based creole
Sangu	Niger–Congo
Sanskrit	Indo-European
Santali	Austroasiatic
Sara Bakati'	Austronesian
Saraiki, Seraiki, or Siraiki Southern Punjabi	Indo-European
Saramaccan	English-based creole
Sardinian	Indo-European
Sardinian, Campidanese	Indo-European
Sardinian, Logudorese	Indo-European
Sarikoli	Indo-European
Sart Kalmyk	Mongolic
Sarudu	Austronesian
Sasak	Austronesian
Sassarese	Indo-European
Saurashtra or Sourashtra	Indo-European
Savi	Indo-European
Sawai	Austronesian
Scots	Indo-European
Shaetlan	Indo-European
Scots, Ulster	Indo-European
Scottish Gaelic or Scots Gaelic or Gaidhlig or Gaelic	Indo-European
Sediq	Austronesian
Sedoa	Austronesian
Selangor Sign Language	Francosign
Selk'nam	Chonan
Selkup or Ostyak Samoyed	Uralic
Semnani	Indo-European
Sempan	Trans–New Guinea
Senaya	Afroasiatic
Sentani	Demta–Sentani
Sentinelese	Unclassified language
Serbian	Indo-European
Serbo-Croatian	Indo-European
Serili	Austronesian
Sesotho	Niger–Congo
Seto or Setu	Uralic
Seychellois Creole	French-based creole
Shabaki	Indo-European
Shambala	Niger–Congo
Shan	Kra–Dai
Shaozhou Tuhua	Sino–Tibetan
Shasta	Shastan
Shanke	Sino–Tibetan
Shekhawati	Indo-European
Shelta	Irish and Irish English-based mixed language
Shiki	Niger–Congo
Shimaore	Niger–Congo
Shina	Indo-European
Shipibo or Shipibo-Konibo	Panoan
Shona	Niger–Congo
Shor	Turkic
Shoshoni or Shoshone	Uto-Aztecan
Shtokavian	Indo-European
Shuar	Chicham
Shughni	Indo-European
Shumashti	Indo-European
Shuswap or Secwepemctsín	Salishan
Shwai	Niger–Congo
Siberian Ingrian Finnish	Ingrian Finnish and Izhorian-based mixed language
Siberian Tatar	Turkic
Siberian Tatar, Tom	Turkic
Sicilian	Indo-European
Siculian	Indo-European
Sidamo	Afroasiatic
Sierra Popoluca or Soteapanec	Mixe–Zoque
Sika	Austronesian
Silesian	Indo-European
Silla or Old Korean	Koreanic
Silt'e or Selti or East Gurage	Afroasiatic
Simbari	Trans–New Guinea
Sinacantán	Xincan
Sinasina	Trans–New Guinea
Singa	Niger–Congo
Sindhi	Indo-European
Singapore Sign Language	Francosign
Sinhala	Indo-European
Sioux	Siouan
Siraya	Austronesian
Sivandi	Indo-European
Siwi	Afroasiatic
Slavey	Na-Dene
Slavomolisano	Indo-European
Slovak	Indo-European
Slovak, Eastern	Indo-European
Slovene or Slovenian	Indo-European
Slovene, Prekmurje	Indo-European
Slovincian	Indo-European
So'a	Austronesian
Soddo or Kistane	Afroasiatic
Sokna	Afroasiatic
Som	Trans–New Guinea
Somali	Afroasiatic
Somali Sign Language	Kenyan–Somali Sign
Somyev	Niger–Congo
Sonde	Niger–Congo
Songo	Niger–Congo
Songoora	Niger–Congo
Sonia	Trans–New Guinea
Sonjo or Temi	Niger–Congo
Sonqori	Turkic
Sonsorolese	Austronesian
Soo	Nilo-Saharan
Soqotri	Afroasiatic
Sora	Austroasiatic
Sorbian, Lower	Indo-European
Sorbian, Upper	Indo-European
Sourashtra	Indo-European
South African Sign Language	BANZSL
Southeast Ijo	Niger–Congo
Southern Altai	Turkic
Southern Ndebele	Niger–Congo
Southern Tiwa	Tanoan–Kiowa
South Picene	Indo-European
Soyot	Turkic
Spanish	Indo-European
Spanish, Amazonic	Indo-European
Spanish, Andalusian	Indo-European
Spanish, Canarian	Indo-European
Spanish, Caribbean	Indo-European
Spanish, Castilian	Indo-European
Spanish, Catalan	Indo-European
Spanish, Chilote	Indo-European
Spanish, Extremaduran or Castúo	Indo-European
Spanish, Galician or Castrapo	Indo-European
Spanish, Gibraltarian or Llanito	Indo-European
Spanish, Mexican	Indo-European
Spanish, Murcian	Indo-European
Spanish, Peninsular	Indo-European
Spanish, Sabine River, Adaeseño Spanish, or Zwolle-Ebarb Spanish	Indo-European
Spanish, Saharan or Western Saharan Spanish	Indo-European
Spanish, Standard	Indo-European
Squamish	Salishan
Sranan Tongo	English-based creole
St'at'imcets or Lillooet	Salishan
Sucite or Sìcìté Sénoufo	Niger–Congo
Suba	Niger–Congo
Suba-Simbiti	Niger–Congo
Subi	Niger–Congo
Suku	Niger–Congo
Sukuma	Niger–Congo
Sumbawa	Austronesian
Sumbwa	Niger–Congo
Sundanese	Austronesian
Supyire or Supyire Senoufo	Niger–Congo
Suret or Sureth	Afroasiatic
Surigaonon	Austronesian
Susu	Niger–Congo
Susuami	Trans–New Guinea
Suundi	Niger–Congo
Svan	Kartvelian
Swahili	Niger–Congo
Swati, Swazi, Siswati, or Seswati	Niger–Congo
Swedish	Indo-European
Swiss-German Sign Language	Unclassified language, possibly DGSic or Francosign
Sylheti	Indo-European
Syriac	Afroasiatic
== T ==
Taa	Tuu
Tabaru	West Papuan
Tabasaran or Tabassaran	Northeast Caucasian
Tacana	Tacanan
Tachelhit	Afroasiatic
Tadaksahak	Nilo-Saharan
Tado	Austronesian
Tagalog	Austronesian
Tagoi	Niger–Congo
Tahitian	Austronesian
Tai Lue	Kra–Dai
Tainae	Trans–New Guinea
Taíno	Arawakan
Tairuma	Trans–New Guinea
Taita	Niger–Congo
Taivoan	Austronesian
Taiwanese Sign Language	JSLic
Taje	Austronesian
Tajik	Indo-European
Tajio	Austronesian
Takestani	Indo-European
Talysh	Indo-European
Tamil	Dravidian
Tanacross	Na-Dene
Tangut	Sino-Tibetan
Tangwang	Mandarin and Santa-based mixed language
Taos or Northern Tiwa	Tanoan–Kiowa
Tarahumara	Uto-Aztecan
Tarama	Japonic
Tarangan	Austronesian
Tarifit or Rifi or Riff Berber	Afroasiatic
Tarjumo	Nilo-Saharan
Tasawaq	Nilo-Saharan
Tat or Tati	Indo-European
Tatar or Volga Tatar	Turkic
Tatar, Mishar	Turkic
Taulil	Taulil–Butam
Tausug	Austronesian
Taveta	Niger–Congo
Taworta	Lakes Plain
Taymanitic	Afroasiatic
Tboli	Austronesian
Tebul Sign Language	Language isolate
Tedaga	Nilo-Saharan
Teduray	Austronesian
Tegali	Niger–Congo
Tehuelche or Aonikenk	Chon
Tela'a	Austronesian
Telengit	Turkic
Teleut	Turkic
Telugu	Dravidian
Terei	South Bougainville
Terêna	Arawakan
Terena Sign Language	Language isolate
Ternate	West Papuan
Teribe	Chibchan
Tetum	Austronesian
Tepehua	Totonacan
Tepehuán or O'otham	Uto-Aztecan
Tewa	Tanoan–Kiowa
Thai	Kra–Dai
Thamudic	Afroasiatic
Thao	Austronesian
Tharu	Indo-European
Tibetan, Lhasa	Sino-Tibetan
Ticuna	Ticuna–Yuri
Tigre or Xasa	Afroasiatic
Tigrinya	Afroasiatic
Tima	Niger–Congo
Timbisha or Panamint	Uto-Aztecan
Timote	Timotean
Tinigua	Tiniguan
Tiro	Niger–Congo
Tiv	Niger–Congo
Tlingit	Na-Dene
Toaripi	Trans–New Guinea
Toba Qom	Guaicuruan
Tobian	Austronesian
Tobo-Kube	Trans–New Guinea
Toda	Dravidian
Tojolab'al	Mayan
Tok Pisin	English-based creole
Tokelauan	Austronesian
Tol or Jicaque	Jicaquean
Tolaki	Austronesian
Tomadino	Austronesian
Tombelala	Austronesian
Tomini	Austronesian
Tommeginne	Northern Tasmanian
Tondi Songway Kiini	Nilo-Saharan
Tonga	Niger–Congo
Tongan	Austronesian
Tongwe	Niger–Congo
Topoiyo	Austronesian
Torlakian	Indo-European
Torwali or Turvali	Indo-European
Totoli	Austronesian
Totonac	Totonacan
Tregami	Indo-European
Trimuris	Foja Range
Trique or Triqui	Oto-Manguean
Tsat	Austronesian
Tsez or Dido	Northeast Caucasian
Tshiluba, Luba-Kasai, or Luba-Lulua	Niger–Congo
Tshwa	Khoe–Kwadi
Tsimshian, Coast	Tsimshianic
Tsimshian, Southern	Tsimshianic
Tsonga	Niger–Congo
Tsou	Austronesian
Tswana or Setswana	Niger–Congo
Tu or Monguor	Mongolic
Tuareg or Tamasheq	Afroasiatic
Tubalar	Turkic
Tucano	Tucanoan
Tuha	Turkic
Tukang Besi	Austronesian
Tulu	Dravidian
Tuma-Irumu	Trans–New Guinea
Tumbuka	Niger–Congo
Tuoba	Unclassified language
Turkish	Turkic
Turkish, Cypriot	Turkic
Turkish, Karamanli	Turkic
Turkish, Ottoman	Turkic
Turkish, Tsalka	Turkic
Turkish Sign Language	Language isolate
Turkmen	Turkic
Turoyo	Afroasiatic
Turrbal	Pama–Nyungan
Turumsa	Trans–New Guinea
Tuscan	Indo-European
Tuvaluan	Austronesian
Tuvan	Turkic
Tuwari	Sepik
Twendi	Niger–Congo
Tyerrernotepanner	Northeastern Tasmanian
Tzeltal	Mayan
Tzotzil	Mayan
== U ==
Udihe or Ude or Udege	Tungusic
Udmurt or Votyak	Uralic
Ufim	Trans–New Guinea
Ugaritic	Afroasiatic
Ujir	Austronesian
Ukrainian	Indo-European
Ulada	Austronesian
Ulch or Olcha	Tungusic
Uma	Austronesian
Umbrian	Indo-European
Unserdeutsch or Rabaul Creole German	German-based creole
Upper Chinook	Chinookan
Upper Sorbian	Indo-European
Urdu	Indo-European
Uri	Trans–New Guinea
Uru	Uru–Chipaya
Urum	Turkic
Uruwa	Trans–New Guinea
Ute	Uto-Aztecan
Uyghur	Turkic
Uzbek	Turkic
Uzbek, Southern	Turkic
== V ==
Vafsi	Indo-European
Valencian	Indo-European
Valencian Sign Language	Catalan Sign
Vanimo	Skou
Vanuma	Niger–Congo
Vasi-vari or Prasuni	Indo-European
Vastese	Indo-European
Vejoz	Matacoan
Venda or Tshivenda	Niger–Congo
Venetian	Indo-European
Venetic	Indo-European
Veps	Uralic
Viduna	Niger–Congo
Vietnamese	Austroasiatic
Vilela	Lule–Vilela
Vili	Niger–Congo
Volscian	Indo-European
Võro	Uralic
Votic or Votian	Uralic
Vute	Niger–Congo
Vwanji	Niger–Congo
== W ==
Wa	Austroasiatic
Waalubal	Pama–Nyungan
Waddar	Dravidian
Wae Rana	Austronesian
Wagaydy	Wagaydyic
Wagiman	Language isolate
Wahgi	Trans–New Guinea
Waigali or Kalasha-Ala	Indo-European
Waima or Roro	Austronesian
Wakabunga	Pama–Nyungan
Wakhi	Indo-European
Walio	Sepik
Wallisian or East Uvean	Austronesian
Walloon	Indo-European
Wambaya	Mirndi
Wanggamala	Pama–Nyungan
Wankumara	Pama–Nyungan
Wantoat	Trans–New Guinea
Wapishana	Arawakan
Waray or Binisaya	Austronesian
Wari'	Chapacuran
Warnang or Werni	Niger–Congo
Warrgamay	Pama–Nyungan
Waru	Austronesian
Washo	Language isolate
Watubela	Austronesian
Wawa	Niger–Congo
Wawonii	Austronesian
Waxiang	Sino-Tibetan
Wayuu	Arawakan
Weliki	Trans–New Guinea
Welsh	Indo-European
Wenzhounese	Sino-Tibetan
Western Apache	Na-Dene
Western Dani	Trans–New Guinea
Western Jicaque	Jicaquean
Western Neo-Aramaic	Afroasiatic
West Polesian or Poleshuk	Indo-European
Woiwurrung–Taungurung	Pama–Nyungan
Wolane or Silt'e	Afroasiatic
Wolio	Austronesian
Wolof	Niger–Congo
Wom	Torricelli
Wotu	Austronesian
Wu	Sino-Tibetan
Wutun	Lower Yangtze Mandarin, Amdo, and Bonan-based mixed language
Wymysorys or Vilamovian	Indo-European
== X ==
Xavante	Macro-Jê
ǁXegwi	Tuu
Xhosa	Niger–Congo
Xiang	Sino-Tibetan
Xiangnan Tuhua	Sino–Tibetan
Xibe or Sibo	Tungusic
Xiongnu	Unclassified language
Xipaya	Tupian
Xong	Hmong–Mien
== Y ==
Yaaku	Afroasiatic
Yaeyama	Japonic
Yaghan or Yámana	Language isolate
Yaghnobi	Indo-European
Yagua	Peba–Yaguan
Yagwoia	Trans–New Guinea
Yaka	Niger–Congo
Yakut or Sakha	Turkic
Yalarnnga	Pama–Nyungan
Yambes	Torricelli
Yami	Austronesian
Yandruwandha	Pama–Nyungan
Yankunytjatjara	Pama–Nyungan
Yaminawa	Panoan
Yanomamö	Yanomaman
Yanyuwa	Pama–Nyungan
Yapese	Austronesian
Yaqui	Uto-Aztecan
Yauma	Niger–Congo
Yavapai	Yuman–Cochimí
Yawenian or Sepik Iwam	Sepik
Yawiyo	Sepik
Yaygir	Pama–Nyungan
Yazdi	Indo-European
Yazgulyam or Yazgulami	Indo-European
Yelmek	Bulaka River
Ye-Maek	Koreanic
Yeni	Niger–Congo
Yi language or Nuosu	Sino-Tibetan
Yiddish	Indo-European
Yidgha	Indo-European
Yilan Creole Japanese	Japanese-based creole
Yimas	Ramu–Lower Sepik
Yine or Piro	Arawakan
Yipma	Trans–New Guinea
Yopno	Trans–New Guinea
Yokuts, Yokutsan, or Mariposa	Yokutsan
Yokuts, Buena Vista	Yokutsan
Yokuts, Delta	Yokutsan
Yokuts, Palewyami	Yokutsan
Yokuts, Tule–Kaweah	Yokutsan
Yokuts, Valley	Yokutsan
Yola	Indo-European
Yolŋu Sign Language	Language isolate
Yonaguni	Japonic
Yoncalla	Kalapuyan
Yorùbá	Niger–Congo
Younuo	Hmong–Mien
Yucatec Maya	Mayan
Yuchi	Language isolate
Yue	Sino-Tibetan
Yue, Cantonese	Sino-Tibetan
Yue, Gao–Yang	Sino-Tibetan
Yue, Goulou	Sino-Tibetan
Yue, Luo–Guang	Sino-Tibetan
Yue, Qin–Lian	Sino-Tibetan
Yue, Siyi	Sino-Tibetan
Yue, Taishanese	Sino-Tibetan
Yue, Wu–Hua	Sino-Tibetan
Yue, Yuehai	Sino-Tibetan
Yugambeh	Pama–Nyungan
Yugh	Yeniseian
Yugur, Eastern	Mongolic
Yugur, Western or Neo-Uygur	Turkic
Yui	Trans–New Guinea
Yukaghir, Northern or Tundra Yukaghir	Yukaghir
Yukaghir, Southern or Forest Yukaghir	Yukaghir
Yuki	Yuki–Wappo
Yukjin	Koreanic
Yupik	Eskaleut
Yup'ik, Central Alaskan	Eskaleut
Yupik, Central Siberian	Eskaleut
Yupik, Naukan	Eskaleut
Yupiltepeque	Xincan
Yurats	Uralic
Yurok	Algic
Yuru	Pama–Nyungan
Yuyu	Pama–Nyungan
== Z ==
Zaghawa	Nilo-Saharan
Zambian Sign Language	Unclassified language
Zanaki	Niger–Congo
Záparo	Zaparoan
Zapotec	Oto-Manguean
Zaramo	Niger–Congo
Zarma	Nilo-Saharan
Zaza or Zazaki	Indo-European
Zeelandic	Indo-European
Zhuang	Kra–Dai
Zigula	Niger–Congo
Zimba	Niger–Congo
Zinza	Niger–Congo
Zoque	Mixe–Zoque
Zoroastrian Dari	Indo-European
Zorop or Yafi	Pauwasi
Zulu	Niger–Congo
Zuñi or Zuni	Language isolate
Zurg or Kufra	Afroasiatic
Zway or Zay	Afroasiatic

== See also ==
- Constructed language and List of constructed languages
- Language (for information about language in general)
- Language observatory
- Languages used on the Internet
- List of fictional languages
- List of programming languages
- Lists of languages
- Sign language and List of sign languages
- List of proto-languages
- List of Mayan languages
- List of pidgins, creoles, mixed languages and cants based on Indo-European languages
- List of lesser-known Loloish languages

By ISO 639-3 code
Enter an ISO code to find the corresponding language article.
