= Gusan =

Gusan may refer to:

- Gusans, performing artists in the Parthian Empire and medieval Greater Armenia
- Nema language or Gusan, Papua New Guinea
- Nine mountain schools or Gusan, monasteries of the Korean branch of Buddhism

== See also ==
- Gusan-dong, a neighbourhood of Seoul, South Korea
