= Yamas language =

You might be looking for:

- The Yamas dialect of the Asmat language of West Papua
- the Yamasee language, an extinct language of the southeastern US
- Yimas language, a language of the Sepic area of Papua New Guinea
- Yeimas, one of the villages where the Gira language is spoken in the Madang province of Papua New Guinea
