= NEK =

NEK or Nek may refer to:

== People ==
- Filippo Neviani, (b. 1972), Italian singer, with stage name Nek.

== Places ==
- Northeast Kingdom, in Vermont, US

== Organizations ==
- Krško Nuclear Power Plant (Nuklearna elektrarna Krško), Vrbina, Krško, Slovenia
- NEK EAD (Natsionalna Elektricheska Kompania), electric company, Sofia, Bulgaria
- North Elbian Evangelical Lutheran Church (Nordelbische Evangelisch-Lutherische Kirche), Germany

== Other uses ==
- Battle of the Nek, a World War I battle
- Neck (water spirit), mythological creature
- Nek language, language in Papua New Guinea
- Nek, mountain pass in Afrikaans
