= Nafi language =

Oceanic language of Papua New Guinea

Nafi
- Sirak
- Region: Markham Valley, New Guinea
- Native speakers: (160 cited 1988)
- Language family: Austronesian: Malayo-Polynesian; Oceanic; Western Oceanic; Huon Gulf; Markham; Lower Markham; Busu; Nafi

Language codes
- ISO 639-3: srf
- Glottolog: nafi1237
- ELP: Nafi
- Coordinates: 6.433548°S 146.825565°E

Nafi, also known as Sirak, is an Austronesian language of Morobe Province, Papua New Guinea.

It is spoken in the single village of Nambom (also known as Banzain village) (6.433548°S 146.825565°E) in Gamiki ward, Wain-Erap Rural LLG. Ethnic Nafi people living in Popof village (6.438745°S 146.805971°E) have since switched to speaking Nakama, a Trans-New Guinea language. Intermarriages frequently occur between the two villages.
