= YGM =

YGM may refer to:

- Gimli Industrial Park Airport's IATA airport code
- Muratayak language's ISO 639 code
- YGM Trading, the parent company of Aquascutum
- "YGM", a song by Atmosphere from Strictly Leakage
