= Baru language =

The Baru language may be:

- Bru language, a Mon–Khmer dialect continuum spoken by the Bru people of mainland Southeast Asia
- Morafa language or Asaro'o, one of the Finisterre languages of Papua New Guinea
