= Tandɨ language =

Finisterre language spoken in Papua New Guinea

Tandɨ
- Yagomi
- Native to: Papua New Guinea
- Region: Madang Province
- Ethnicity: 300
- Native speakers: 20 (2020)
- Language family: Trans–New Guinea: Finisterre–Huon; Finisterre; Warup; Tandɨ

Language codes
- ISO 639-3: ygm
- Glottolog: yago1240

Tandɨ (Tanda) is a nearly extinct Finisterre language spoken in Yagomi village (5.743019°S 146.605737°E) of Rai Coast Rural LLG, Madang Province.
