= Sauk language (disambiguation) =

Sauk language can refer to either:

- Sauk or Ma Manda language of Papua New Guinea
- Sauk language of the Sac tribe of Native Americans (a dialect of Fox, also called Meskwaki)

== See also ==
- Saek language, a Tai language of Laos
- Sok language, an Austroasiatic language of Laos
