= Asang language =

The Asang language may refer to:

- Khumi language, a Kukish language of Burma and across the border in Bangladesh
- Nekgini language, one of the Finisterre languages of Papua New Guinea, spoken in a single village in Madang Province
