= MHF (disambiguation) =

MHF is Marburg hemorrhagic fever, renamed Marburg virus disease.

MHF may also refer to:

- Mamaa language (by ISO 639 code)
- Morichal Airport, in Colombia (by IATA code)
- Mount Hood Freeway, a cancelled freeway in Oregon, United States
