= NKG =

NKG or nkg may refer to:

- NKG, the IATA code for Nanjing Lukou International Airport, Jiangsu, China
- nkg, the ISO 639-3 code for Nekgini language, Papua New Guinea
