= Domuna language =

The Domuna language may be:

- Mailu language or Magi, a Papuan language of Papua New Guinea
- Neko language (Dumuna), one of the Finisterre languages of Papua New Guinea, spoken in a single village in Madang Province
