= Som language =

Finisterre languages of Papua New Guinea

Som
- Native to: Papua New Guinea
- Region: Morobe Province
- Native speakers: 500 (2017)
- Language family: Trans–New Guinea: Finisterre–Huon; Finisterre; Uruwa; Som

Language codes
- ISO 639-3: smc
- Glottolog: somm1240
- ELP: Som
- Som is classified as Definitely Endangered by the UNESCO Atlas of the World's Languages in Danger.

Som (Somm) is one of the Finisterre languages of Papua New Guinea.
