= Iyo language =

Finisterre language spoken in Papua New Guinea

Iyo
- Nahu
- Native to: Papua New Guinea
- Region: Morobe Province
- Native speakers: 6,900 (2003)
- Language family: Trans–New Guinea: Finisterre–Huon; Finisterre; Gusap–Mot; Iyo

Language codes
- ISO 639-3: nca
- Glottolog: iyoo1238

Iyo is a language spoken in the Madang Province of Papua New Guinea that comes from the Trans-New Guinea language family. Iyo also goes by the names Bure, Naho, Nabu, and Nahu. It has about 6,900 speakers. The Iyo language was previously known as Nahu because the first discovered speakers of the language lived in villages along the Nahu river. The name changed due to other communities speaking the same language but having different names for it. It was decided to call the language 'Iyo', which is the word for 'yes', after the leaders in the communities agreed to it.

== Names ==
The alternate names for Iyo are Bure, Nabu, Naho, Nahu and Ndo.

== Speakers ==
The Iyo people live in a society that values equality. Before the Lutheran church's influence, families would live in small settlements across mountainous regions. Around the mid-1950s, villages were created with a local church acting as the center of the village. Over time, villages became more religiously diverse and gained contact with other cultures. The village houses are almost entirely made out of resources from the forests around the mountain with the exception of nails, hinges, and a corrugated metal roof from time to time. The Iyo people typically ate root vegetables such as taro and sweet potato. They also at corn, beans, and fruit when there was no taro and sweet potato. They farm these crops in a 'slash and burn' style on the mountain slopes. Pigs are also raised in small amounts and are saved for fests during special occasions. Sometimes they would grow coffee and vanilla beans to trade with other groups in the area.

== Phonology ==
=== Consonants ===
The Iyo language contains 15 consonants. One more phoneme that is represented by 'dz' can sometimes occur due to the close relationship between the Iyo language and the Kate language. This sound only appears in some names so it is not included. The phoneme 's' represents two different sounds. One is the conventional 's' sound and the other one creates a 'ts' sound. Similar to 's', the phoneme 'r' also represents two different sounds. These two sounds are 'r' and 'l'.

Consonant Phonemes
	Bilabial	Alveolar	Palatal	Velar	Uvular	Glottal
Plosive	p b	t d		k kʰ g	q	
Nasal	m	n		ŋ		
Tap/Flap		r				
Fricative		s z				h
Approximant	w		j			

=== Vowels ===
The Iyo language contains 5 vowels. The phoneme 'e' makes an 'ɛ' sound if it is before the consonants 'p', 'b', 't', 'd', 'r', 's', or 'z' along with stressed syllables before 'k'.

Vowel Phonemes
	-back	+back
+high,-low	i	u
-high,-low	e	o
-high,+low		a

=== Syllables ===
The syllables in Iyo follow a general rule of a consonant followed by a vowel. There are a few times where there will be two vowels clustered together (ex. ae, ia, ou, ua.), but consonants must be separated by a vowel in between.

=== Stress ===
Iyo has a predictable stress pattern where the second to last syllable, or the penultimate syllable, contains primary stress. In addition, secondary stress is on the fourth and sixth syllables if there is any.

=== Nasalisation ===
Most vowels in Iyo are nasalized if they are found in stressed syllables. Nasaliation is a feature on some roots and suffixes. Nasalisation can occur when syllables contain a voiceless sound and is attached to a root or suffix like 'ka' in 'kato', 'awa' in 'awando', and 'pare' in 'pareke'.

== Counters ==
The Iyo language follows a base five counting system. After the number five, the number six is thought of as five plus one (ex. 'kandeka' means five 'kande saŋiyo kanata' means six but is literally translated to five plus one). The counting system uses hands and legs to communicate numbers from one to twenty (ex. 'nimi kini' means four and is translated to 'without the thumb', 'kande irisa' means ten and is translated to 'two hands' and 'khe kande soso' means twenty and is translated to 'all legs and hands'). In addition, adding 'qu' after a number turns it into an ordinal number (ex. 'kandeka' means five and 'kandeka qu' means fifth). The only exceptions to this is 'first', 'second', and 'third' where a possessive suffix is included. This counting system is not being used too frequently. Instead, the counting system of Tok Pisin has been adopted and is more commonly used.

Cardinal Number System
Kanata	One
Irisa	Two
Kapusa	Three
Nimi kini	Four (without thumb)
Kandeka	Five (one hand)
Kande saŋiyo kanata	Six (hand plus one)

Ordinal Number System
Korete qu	First
Irisayo qu	Second
Kapusayo qu	Third
Nimi kini qu	Fourth
Kandeka qu	Fifth
Kande saŋiyo kanata qu	Sixth

== Verbs ==
There are two distinct types of verbs in Iyo. In a sentence, it is common to have multiple verbs with at least one being a medial verb, and one final verb. A medial verb uses a suffix to connect the subject of a verb to another verb while a final verb uses a suffix to identify the tense, and number of the subject.

== Word Order ==
Iyo does not have a specific word order that it follows. Depending on the sentence, the word order can change from a Subject Object Verb (SOV) order to an Object Subject Verb (OSV) order.

=== Subject Object Verb ===
SVO word order is the most common word order found in Iyo.

ex. 'No kombono qare seqanowo'

1S moon-LOC cuscus look.for-PST-1s-RPST

'I hunted cuscus in the moonlight.'

=== Object Subject Verb ===
OSV word order is a rare occurrence that can happen when the subject is the focus of the sentence. When this happens, the subject word and object word can swap places, however both ways are acceptable.

ex. 'Kopore mira pokamote.'

S O V

cloud ground cover0PRES-2/3s

'Clouds are covering the ground.'

'Mira kopore pokamote.'

O S V

ground cloud cover-PRES-2/3s

'Clouds are covering the ground.'

In this case, both sentences are acceptable.

== Word Tense ==
There are four different tenses in Iyo. The tense of a sentence can be distinguished by the final verb.

=== Remote Past ===
The remote past tense is used when the speaker is talking about something that happened two or more days ago from the time in the narrative.

ex. 'Nuwi qenero'

cousin-3sPOSS see-PST-2/3s-RPST

'He saw his cousin.'

=== Past ===
Past tense refers to a time range from a few hours ago to yesterday. Past tense is typically not used in stories unless it is in direct quotes from someone in the story. The context of a story uses remote past tense while a quote from someone in the story uses past tense.

ex. 'Sira rimiyaŋgo ŋu naŋge qeneroqo sira sowe tero rimiyoteŋgo'

taro plant-CONT-PST-2/3p DEM DISC see-SS-SUB taro continuation do-SS plant-CONT-PRES-2/3p

'Seeing it simply as the type of taro they always planted they added it to the taro they are planting now.'

=== Present ===
Present tense refers to another range of time from a few hours ago to the current time. It can refer to something that is in the process of happening or something that has recently happened.

ex. 'ŋu iŋoteno'

DEM know-PRES-1s

'I understand that.'

=== Future ===
Future tense is used when something will probably happen in the near to distant future. It is commonly used when a specific time is not known.

ex. 'Balusi naru kano areweya ŋu Seweko o siyoni uweya'

airplane time INDEF-LOC come.up-FUT-2/3s DEM Sewe-TOP things get.PLOBJ-3sDS go.down-FUT-2/3s

'At whatever time the plane will come up, Sewe will get their things and it will go down.'

== Sentence Types ==
The Iyo language has three basic types of sentences. More complex sentences are chains of these sentence types.

=== Declarative ===
Declarative sentences are sentences used to state something.

ex. 'Dopeke koya Takeme koya tokono oriyo'

Dopeke TOP-ACC Takeme TOP-ACC forest-ALL go.up-PST-2/3d-RPST

'Dopeke and Takeme went up to the forest.'

=== Imperative ===
Imperative sentences are technically sentence fragments due to the final verb in a sentence being implied. Since there is no final verb stated in the sentence, imperative sentences end with a medial verb.

ex. 'Asa, ye woso kutaqemo mahika.'

alright 2P pull nearby-ALL come-2pIMP-SEQ

'Alright, you all come up close beside me.'

=== Interrogative ===
Interrogative sentences often have interrogative pronouns and typically have a rising intonation that drops at the end of the question.

ex. 'Kopipe neweya?'

coffee-YNQ 3sDO-drink-FUT-2/3s

'Will you drink some coffee?'

== Spatial words ==
Spatial words in Iyo are based on the speaker or the person being spoken to. Due to the mountainous region that most of the people who speak Iyo live in, spatial words identify objects that are higher, lower, across, beside, or behind the recipient, and if the object is close or far.

Spatial Words
	Close	Far
Higher	awe	o
Across	ande	andu
Lower	ame	amu
Beside	dina	ande
Behind	mina	amu

== Loan Words ==
There are a few occurrences of loan words in Iyo. Most of the words come from Tok Pisin since it is a more dominant language and is used for wider communication (ex. 'keseti' is taken from the word 'keset' in Tok Pisin which means cassette, 'sipeti' is taken from the word 'spet' in Tok Pisin which means spade, and 'balusi' is taken from the word 'balus' in Tok Pisin which means 'airplane'. Most of the loan words are for objects that never had a word in Iyo before.

ex. 'Balusi bukimŋaro'

airplane make.booking-3sDO-PST-2/3s-RPST

'He booked a plane.'
