= Rawa language =

Finisterre languages of Papua New Guinea

Rawa
- Karo
- Native to: Papua New Guinea
- Region: Morobe Province
- Native speakers: (12,000 cited 1998)
- Language family: Trans–New Guinea: Finisterre–Huon; Finisterre; Gusap–Mot; Rawa

Language codes
- ISO 639-3: rwo
- Glottolog: rawa1267

Rawa (Erawa, Erewa, Raua) is one of the Finisterre languages of Papua New Guinea. The two dialects, Rawa and Karo, are on opposite sides of the Finisterre Range.

== Names ==
The alternate names for Rawa are Erawa, Erewa, Raua and Karo.

== Phonology ==
=== Consonants ===
		Labial	Alveolar	Palatal	Velar	Glottal
Nasal		m	n		ŋ	
Plosive	voiceless	p	t		k	
Plosive	aspirated	pʰ	tʰ		kʰ	
Plosive	prenasal	ᵐb	ⁿd		ᵑɡ	
Fricative			s			h
Rhotic			r			
Approximant	lateral		l			
Approximant	central	w		j		

- Voiceless stops /p, t, k/ are heard as voiced stops [b, d, ɡ] in the Karo dialect.

=== Vowels ===
	Front	Central	Back
High	i		u
High-mid	e		o
Low-mid			ɔ
Low		a	
