= Wain-Erap Rural LLG =

Local-level government in Papua New Guinea

- Location within Papua New Guinea
- Coordinates: 6.432699°S 146.819535°E
- Country: Papua New Guinea
- Province: Morobe Province
- Time zone: UTC+10 (AEST)

Wain-Erap Rural LLG is a local-level government (LLG) of Morobe Province, Papua New Guinea.

== Wards ==
- 01. Kokosan
- 02. Saut
- 03. Finungwa
- 04. Lowai
- 05. Rabisap
- 06. Tinibi
- 07. Sintogora (Mungkip language speakers)
- 08. Kisengan One
- 09. Kisengan Two
- 10. Gain
- 11. Sadao
- 12. Kuepunum
- 13. Bandong
- 14. Gusi
- 15. Gamiki (Nafi language speakers)
- 16. Pupuf
- 17. Gumbum
- 18. Gewak
