= Numanggang language =

Language

Numanggang
- Native to: Papua New Guinea
- Native speakers: (2,300 cited 2000 census)
- Language family: Trans–New Guinea: Finisterre–Huon; Finisterre; Erap; Numanggang

Language codes
- ISO 639-3: nop
- Glottolog: numa1254

Numanggang (Manggang) is a language of Papua New Guinea. Other names are Boana, Kai, Ngain, Sugu. Numanggang is preferred over Tok Pisin in the village court because its use is believed to have a calming effect on proceedings.

== Names ==
The alternate names for Numanggang are Boana, Kai, Manggang, Ngain, Numangan, Numangang, and Sugu.

== The letter Ɋ ==
The letter Ɋ, also known as Q with hook tail, was introduced by Lutheran missionaries in Papua New Guinea for use in the Numanggang language in the 1930s or 1940s. In 2002, it was decided to discontinue using the letter.
