= Bulgebi language =

Finisterre languages of Papua New Guinea

Bulgebi
- Native to: Papua New Guinea
- Region: Madang Province
- Ethnicity: 150 (2016)
- Native speakers: 150 (2015)
- Language family: Trans–New Guinea: Finisterre–Huon; Finisterre; Warup; Bulgebi

Language codes
- ISO 639-3: bmp
- Glottolog: bulg1265
- ELP: Bulgebi
- Bulgebi is classified as Definitely Endangered by the UNESCO Atlas of the World's Languages in Danger.

Bulgebi is a nearly extinct Finisterre languages of Papua New Guinea. It is spoken in the Madang province near the Astrolabe Bay and the lower Nankina river, slightly inland on the eastern end of the southern coast.
