= Gwahatike language =

Finisterre language spoken in Papua New Guinea

Gwahatike
- Dahating
- Native to: Papua New Guinea
- Native speakers: 1,600 (2003)
- Language family: Trans–New Guinea: Finisterre–Huon; Finisterre; Warup; Gwahatike

Language codes
- ISO 639-3: dah
- Glottolog: gwah1244

Gwahatike (also called Dahating or Gwatike) is a language generally classified in the Warup branch of the Finisterre family of Finisterre–Huon languages. As of 2003, it was spoken by 1570 people in Papua New Guinea. It is spoken in several villages located south of Saidor.

== Phonology ==
Consonants
	Labial	Alveolar	Dorsal
Plosive	p b	t d	k g
Fricative	f	s	h
Nasal	m	n	ŋ
Approximant		r, l	

- A glottal plosive [ʔ] appears word-finally if the word ends with a short vowel.
- /s/ and /n/ are palatalized [sʲ nʲ] before /i(ː)/.
- /r/ is unvoiced [r̥] preceding /h/ or word-finally.

Vowels
	Front	Central	Back
High	i iː		u uː
Mid	e eː		o oː
Low		a aː	
