= Awara language =

Finisterre language of Papua New Guinea

Awara
- Native to: Papua New Guinea
- Region: Morobe Province
- Ethnicity: 1,800 (2011)
- Native speakers: 1,800 (2011)
- Language family: Trans–New Guinea: Finisterre–Huon; Finisterre; Wantoat; Awara

Language codes
- ISO 639-3: awx
- Glottolog: awar1248

Awara is one of the Finisterre languages of Papua New Guinea. It is part of a dialect chain with Wantoat, but in only 60–70% lexically similar. There are around 1900 Awara speakers that live on the southern slopes of the Finisterre Range, they live along the east and west sides of Leron River basin.

== Culture ==
The Awara people value group harmony, consensus, and religion. They attend church every Sunday, during these gatherings they also discuss any sorts of problems that people may have until they find a solution. The Church and government roles are separated, but they are also not separated because people who have leadership roles in the government usually have a leadership role in the church. In addition "all local government functions (meetings, community work projects, etc) are organized at the community church gatherings, regional government matters are also discussed at the regional church meetings."

== Alphabet ==
The Awara language has 21 letters (Aa, Ää, Bb, Dd, Ee, Ff, Gg, Hh, Ii, Jj, Kk, Ll, Mm, Nn, Oo, Pp, Ss, Tt, Uu, Ww, Xx, Yy, Zz), 3 digraphs (Gw gw, Kw kw, Ng ng) and trigraph (Ngw ngw).

== Phonology ==
=== Consonants ===
Awara consonants can be categorized into labial, coronal, and a dorsal. These are further split into voiced stops, voiceless stops, nasals, and voiced spirants. Many of the consonants in Awara have different sounds (for example voiced lateral /l/ can also be pronounced as [r], and the special character b represents not only a voiced labial stop [b], but also a voiced fricative [v] or a glide [w]).

Consonant Phonemes
	Labial	Alveolar	Palatal	Labialised Velar	Velar	Glottal
Voiced stops	b	d		g^{w}	g	
Voiceless stop	p	t		k^{w}	k	
Voiced Fricatives	b				ḡ	
Voiceless fricatives		s				h
Nasals	m	n		ŋ^{w}	ŋ	
Voiced laterals		l				
Glides			y			

=== Vowels ===
There are 6 vowels in Awara. The vowels /e, i, u/ generally appear before the consonants /m/ and /l/, but they can sometimes appear after them. The vowels are split into three categories: front vowels (I and e), middle/central vowels (A and a), and back vowels (u and o). The front vowels in Awara are generally lax. There are a few allophones for vowels in Awara. [I] is usually pronounced as [t] in addition to [I].

Vowel Phonemes
	Front	Mid	Back
High	I		u
Mid	e	A	o
Low		a	

=== Syllables ===
Syllables in Awara will generally follow a CVC pattern, this can be split to patterns like V, CV, or VC. The rule is consonants must always be separated by a vowel, the common vowel order of a word in Awara would be V followed by CV which is then followed by VC. So, a word in Awara will follow a pattern like this “VCVCVC.” Different patterns appear at different places. For example, “V syllables can never occur at the end of the word, VC syllables occur word initially and sometimes medially but never at the end, and CVC and CV can occur anywhere in a word.”

=== Stress ===
Awara uses a pitch accent system this is common in many Papuan languages. Awara itself has three different patterns of stress, one primary and two secondary or alternate patterns. The primary pattern stresses the first and third syllables, while the main focus of the stress falls on the last syllable that is stressed.
Example:
/Ayi/ -> a.yi 'grandmother'. In this word the 'yi' is stressed.

== Reduplication ==
In Awara reduplication is usually applied to bisyllabic words. The word matekmatekrn∆ 'little things' is the only exception to this rule, as its base is trisyllabic, expanded by the derivative suffix-n∆ which shows reduplication. There are two types of reduplication in Awara. The first one duplicates an already existing word with its own meaning and lowers the semantic category of the word. An example of this is halu and haluhalu: halu means 'beach', and the reduplicated form haluhalu means 'sand', i.e. what is on the beach. The second type of reduplication copies bases that by themselves have no meaning. For example gak by itself has no meaning but gakgak refers to a tree species.

== Pronouns ==
Awara pronouns are linked to verbs, for this the verb endings are changed to reflect whether the action is about you someone else or more than one person. An example of this would be changing the verb for sew into he will sew it, the verb for sew is bup in order to change this into will sew we need to add pik after it. This changes the word to bupik which means 'he will sew'.

p,b verbs
	Future	Immediate
1s	-pit	-pa
2s	-pilΛk	
3s	-pik	-pΛn

p,b verb endings
	Future	Immediate
1s	b	d
2s	b	d

== Morphology ==
=== Verbs ===
Awara verbs can be split into two subcategories, ones that take inflectional affixes and ones that do not. Most verbs do take inflectional affixes. The only verbs that do not take the inflectional affixes are the existential verbs käyä 'exist' and wenä 'not exist'.

Wa sade miting-u käyä
this Sunday meeting-TOP exist
'This Sunday there is a meeting.'

Normally existential verbs stand alone as the predicate but ti 'be' can be used with them to support tense or switch-reference.

Moyo yiwit-na, nax-u wenä ti-wik
withoutStay-1P.DSfood=Top not.exist be-3s.FUT
'If we do nothing (lit. If we stay without doing anything) there will not be food.'

=== Derivational Verb Stem Morphology ===
"Awara has three means for deriving verb stems: lexical compounding, benefactive compounding, and forming verbs from nouns via the addition of derivational suffix -la 'become'." Lexical compounding uses the two types of compounds in Awara: noun-verb and verb-verb compounds. Noun-verb compounds refer to what is used to perform the action or what happens to the object. Verb-verb compounds describe two actions that occur. The latter type commonly includes the verb ä 'take' followed by a motion verb such as apu 'come'.

==== Noun-Verb compound ====
A=lut-de-ke nä-ka-ying=unin.
PRFOC=nail-detach-ss.PF eat-p.DIFF-23P.PRES=INDIV
'They picked them with the fingernails and eat them (breadfruit).

==== Verb-Verb compound ====
Yanggä kalux=u t-äjapu na-m-Ø.
water new=TOP S.O-take-come 1S.O-give-2S.IMM
'Bring some cold (fresh) water and give it to me.

Benefactive compounding uses the verb mi 'give', which usually follows another verb. This verb can also change to gatäp which means 'help' making it function as a benefactive.

==== Benefactive compound ====
hängä ngäkge-kän gata-ni-mi-ngga-k.
thing much-only help-1P.O-give-s.DiPF-3s.PRES
'... he helps us with many things'

Other verbs use la 'become' as a suffix, as which it is pronounced in four different ways: la, ta, da, and ka. These different forms are used in specific instances: "la is used after a vowel, ka is used after underlying velars, ta is used after an underlying /t/ or /n/, and da is used after consonants."

A-xupi-ta-ngga-k.
PRFOC-angry-become-s.DIPF-3s.PRES
'He is angry.'

== Syntax ==
=== Word Order ===
The basic word order of Awara clauses is SOV. "Arguments and other constituents may be marked with postpositions, which are phonologically bound to the preceding word as clitics. An examples of this is the =dä in the following example sentence; others are =ge or =le.

Silas=dä Yälämbing=ge wätä wamä-ngä-mi-k.
Silas=ABL Yälämbing=DAT sore tie-3s.0-give-3s.PRES
'Silas bandaged Yalambing's sore.'

=== Classifiers ===
The noun classifier system in Awara consists of around 30 classifiers. "Most classifiers give some indication of the physical shape or arrangement of the item named by the noun." An example of a classifier is täpä, which is used in combination with things that are stick-like. Sometimes more than one classifier is combined with a noun to clarify what it is used for. For example, yanggä 'water' can be combined with the classifier for rope-like things, täknga, to refer to a drink). A classifier always appears on the right of a noun and on the left of suffixes.

== Loan Words ==
Loan words in Awara are primarily from Tok Pisin, but there are also some that come from English. Other words, especially names and religious terms, come from Yabium. There are three categories of loan words: loan words that conform to Awara phonology, loan words that violate Awara phonology, and loan words that add to the Awara phonemic inventory. Loan words that conform remove their voiced stops and changes them to unreleased voiceless stops (e.g. 'chord' from Tok Pisin changes to kod in Awara but is spelled as kot). Awara pronounces [r] but it does not exist in their alphabet, so the sound is represented by <l> in writing, as in lais 'rice, which is pronounced as [rais]. The [r] can be understood as an allophone of /l/. Most loan words are words for things that do not exist in the Awara language. Many of these can be identified by the letter combination ai, as in pailot 'pilot'.

== Modal Nouns ==
Awara has three modal nouns: nangäsä expresses possibility, nangän expresses obligation, and nangge expresses purpose. "They can function as either the argument of a clause, as predicates, and as adverbial modifiers. Modal nouns require nonfinite clauses to accompany them and cannot exist without them.

[Akop-nangge] natä-ke=ngä ako-pit.
come.up-PURPOSE want-SS.PF=after come.up-1s.FUT
'When I want to come up, I will.'

== Negation ==
There are three phrases that are used for negation in Awara. The two most common ones are do= and =undo, which are found before inflecting verbs. ma is the third negator, which is used with imperatives, third person hortatives, or a complement of the modal noun =nangän.

.. epuxu-wa do=n-u-kin.
come.out-1s.DS NEG=1s.o-hit-23p.PAST
'I went out and they didn't hit me.'
