= Nayudo Rural LLG =

Local-level government in Papua New Guinea

- Location within Papua New Guinea
- Coordinates: 5.859298°S 146.64999°E
- Country: Papua New Guinea
- Province: Madang Province
- District: Rai Coast District

Area
  - Total: 657.5 km^{2} (253.9 sq mi)

Population (2021 Estimate)
  - Total: 15,861
  - Density: 24.12/km^{2} (62.48/sq mi)
- Time zone: UTC+10 (AEST)

Nayudo Rural LLG is a local-level government (LLG) of Madang Province, Papua New Guinea. The Domung language is spoken in the LLG. Ward name#. Councillor name's.

- 01.kopbo. Paul lukas
- 02. Tapen station.kison Yayena
- 03. Aunon.Ben Foike
- 04. Boana.Sonny Sapun
- 05. Tazon.Jeffery Quasenu
- 06. Kwembum.mark kosmin
- 07. Weskokop.Jacob.Triro
- 08. Taep.Kopingkeo Fonu
- 09. Bambu.Yuape Bowozong.
- 10. Meweng.Deecees/died.
- 11. Gumase.senuka kaku
- 12. Gwarawon.Fosne Buro
- 13. Miok.Bomemba Wasao
- 14. Tariknan.Basawe Banongan
- 15. Mibu.Mark Mutriwe
