= Ufim language =

Finisterre languages of Papua New Guinea

Ufim
- Native to: Papua New Guinea
- Region: Morobe Province
- Native speakers: (1,300 cited 2000)
- Language family: Trans–New Guinea: Finisterre–Huon; Finisterre; Gusap–Mot; Ufim

Language codes
- ISO 639-3: ufi
- Glottolog: ufim1240

Ufim is one of the Finisterre languages of Papua New Guinea.
