= Ngaing language =

Language

Ngaing
- Native to: Papua New Guinea
- Region: Madang Province
- Native speakers: (2,000 cited 2000 census)
- Language family: Trans–New Guinea: Finisterre–Huon; Finisterre; Gusap–Mot; Ngaing

Language codes
- ISO 639-3: nnf
- Glottolog: ngai1241

Ngaing, also known as Mailang and Sor, is one of the Finisterre languages of Papua New Guinea.
