= Tuma-Irumu language =

Finisterre language of Papua New Guinea

Tuma
- Irumu
- Native to: Papua New Guinea
- Region: Morobe Province
- Native speakers: (1,100 cited 2000)
- Language family: Trans–New Guinea: Finisterre–Huon; Finisterre; Wantoat; Tuma

Language codes
- ISO 639-3: iou
- Glottolog: tuma1250

Tuma, or (Upper) Irumu, is of one of the Finisterre languages of Papua New Guinea.
