= Bonkiman language =

Finisterre languages of Papua New Guinea

Bonkiman
- Native to: Papua New Guinea
- Region: Morobe Province
- Ethnicity: 230 (2000 census)
- Native speakers: 150 (2014)
- Language family: Trans–New Guinea: Finisterre–Huon; Finisterre; Yupna; Bonkiman

Language codes
- ISO 639-3: bop
- Glottolog: bonk1244
- ELP: Bonkiman

Bonkiman is one of the Finisterre languages of Papua New Guinea.
