= Yopno language =

Finisterre language spoken in Papua New Guinea

Yopno
- Native to: Papua New Guinea
- Region: Madang, Morobe Provinces
- Native speakers: 9,000 (2010)
- Language family: Trans–New Guinea: Finisterre–Huon; Finisterre; Yupna; Yopno

Language codes
- ISO 639-3: yut
- Glottolog: yopn1238

Yopno (Yupna, after the Yupna Valley) is one of the Finisterre languages of Papua New Guinea. Dialects are Kewieng, Nokopo, Wandabong, Isan. Yupno speakers orient themselves using local topography.

== Phonology ==
Consonants
		Bilabial	Dental	Alveolar	Palatal	Velar
Stop	voiceless	p	t̪			k
Stop	voiced	b	d̪			g
Fricative				s		
Nasal		m		n		ŋ
Approximant			l̪		j	
