= Mungkip language =

Language spoken in Morobe Province, Papua New Guinea

Munkip
- Native to: Papua New Guinea
- Region: Morobe Province
- Ethnicity: 670 (2009)
- Native speakers: 12 (2009)
- Language family: Trans–New Guinea: Finisterre–Huon; Finisterre; Erap; Munkip

Language codes
- ISO 639-3: mpv
- Glottolog: mung1272
- ELP: Munkip

Munkip (Mungkip) is a nearly extinct Finisterre language of Papua New Guinea. It is spoken in Kasuka (6.460182°S 146.720285°E) and Mungkip (6.478612°S 146.630269°E) villages of Sintogora ward, Wain-Erap Rural LLG.

== Phonology ==
The phonology for Mungkip is as follows:

Consonants
		Labial	Alveolar	Palatal	Velar	Uvular	Glottal
Nasal		/m/	/n/		/ŋ/		
Stop	Voiceless	/p/	/t/		/k/	/q/	
Stop	Aspirated				/kʰ/	/qʰ/	
Stop	Voiced	/b/	/d/		/g/		
Affricate			/d͡z/	/d͡ʒ/			
Fricative	Voiceless	/f/	/s/			/χ/	/h/
Fricative	Voiced		/z/			/ʁ/	
Tap/Flap			/ɾ/				
Approximant		/w/	/l/	/j/			

Vowels
	Front	Center	Back
Close	/i/	/ɨ/	/u/
Near-close	/ɪ/		
Close-mid	/e/		/o/
Mid	/ɛ/	/ə/	
Open			/ɑ/
