= Nankina language =

Finisterre language of Papua New Guinea

Nankina
- Native to: Papua New Guinea
- Region: Madang Province
- Native speakers: (3,500 cited 2000 census)
- Language family: Trans–New Guinea: Finisterre–Huon; Finisterre; Yupna; Nankina

Language codes
- ISO 639-3: nnk
- Glottolog: nank1250

Nankina is one of the Finisterre languages of Papua New Guinea.

== Phonology ==
=== Consonant ===
Nankina consonant
		Labial	Coronal	Dorsal
Nasal		m	n	ŋ
Plosive	voiceless	p	t	k
Plosive	voiced	b	d	ɡ
Fricative	voiceless		s	
Fricative	voiced		z	
Approximant				j

=== Vowel ===
Nankina vowel
	Front		Back	
	unrounded	rounded	unrounded	rounded
Close	i	y		u
Close-mid	e			o
Open-mid			ʌ	
Open	a			

== Orthography ==
Nankina alphabet
a	ʌ	b	d	e	g	i	j	k	m	n	ŋ	o	p	s	t	u	z	y
