= Yau language (Trans–New Guinea) =

Finisterre language of Papua New Guinea

Yau
- Uruwa
- Native to: Papua New Guinea
- Region: Morobe Province
- Native speakers: (2,400 cited 2000)
- Language family: Trans–New Guinea: Finisterre–Huon; Finisterre; Uruwa; Yau

Language codes
- ISO 639-3: yuw
- Glottolog: yaum1237

Yau is one of the two major dialects of the Uruwa Language that is spoken by the Uruwa people. It is a Finisterre language of Papua New Guinea.

It is spoken in Boit, Boksawin, Komdaron, Sapmanga, Sapurong, Sindamon, and Sugan villages in Morobe Province. The Southern dialects are called Nungon or Nuon, and are spoken in the Kotet, Mitmit, Mup, Towet, Worin, and Yawan villages. The dialects are fairly equally divided among the 3,000 people that live in the Uruwa River valley.

The two major dialects are about 60-65% related based on shared vocabulary and don't have great clarity in understanding one another.
