= Domung language =

Finisterre languages of Papua New Guinea

Domung
- Gabutamon
- Native to: Papua New Guinea
- Region: Madang Province
- Native speakers: 2,300 (2006–2014)
- Language family: Trans–New Guinea: Finisterre–Huon; Finisterre; Yupna; Domung

Language codes
- ISO 639-3: Either: dev – Domung ytw – Yout Wam
- Glottolog: domu1246 Domung yout1234 Yout Wam

Nankinian is one of the Finisterre languages of Papua New Guinea. Nankina Wam, Domung Meh, and Yupno Gen are related varieties.

Domung Meh is spoken in Yout village (5.847566°S 146.571819°E) of Nayudo Rural LLG, while Domung is spoken in Aunon, Ayengket, Bobongat, Dirit, Gabutamon, Kian, Kosit, Maramung, Maum, Sibgou, Swantan, Tapen, and Wokopop villages in Madang Province. Nankina is also spoken in Taip, Yowangowo, Bambu, Meweng, Ayongowo, Gupbayong, Mambak, Sepbawang, Sevan, Kandambo, Gwarawon, MIOK, Pivin, Mebu, Tariknan, Youthbo, Mambit, Dakuwe and Yongem in the Rai coast District Madang province.
