= Nimi language =

Language spoken in Papua New Guinea

Nimi
- Native to: Papua New Guinea
- Region: Morobe Province, upper Erap River, south of the Saruwaged Range.
- Native speakers: 2,000 (2006)
- Language family: Trans–New Guinea: Finisterre–Huon; Finisterre languages; Erap; Nimi

Language codes
- ISO 639-3: nis
- Glottolog: nimi1240

Nimi is a language spoken in Papua New Guinea. There were about 1400 native speakers as of 1980.
