= Weliki language =

Finisterre language of Papua New Guinea

Weliki
- Native to: Papua New Guinea
- Region: Morobe Province
- Native speakers: (200 cited 1990)
- Language family: Trans–New Guinea: Finisterre–Huon; Finisterre; Uruwa; Weliki

Language codes
- ISO 639-3: klh
- Glottolog: weli1239
- ELP: Weliki

Weliki is one of the Finisterre languages of Papua New Guinea.
