= Degenang language =

Finisterre language of Papua New Guinea

Degenang
- Native to: Papua New Guinea
- Region: Madang Province
- Native speakers: 790 (2003)
- Language family: Trans–New Guinea: Finisterre–Huon; Finisterre; Warup; Degenang

Language codes
- ISO 639-3: dge
- Glottolog: dege1247

Degenang (Degenan, Dingana) is one of the Finisterre languages of Papua New Guinea.
