= Nukna language =

Finisterre language of Papua New Guinea

Nukna
- Komutu
- Native to: Papua New Guinea
- Region: Morobe Province
- Ethnicity: 1,000 (2015)
- Native speakers: 1,000 (2015)
- Language family: Trans–New Guinea: Finisterre–Huon; Finisterre; Uruwa; Nukna

Language codes
- ISO 639-3: klt
- Glottolog: nukn1238
- ELP: Nukna

Nukna, or Komutu, is one of the Finisterre languages of Papua New Guinea.

== Phonology ==
Consonants
	Labial	Alveolar	Dorsal
Plosive	p	t	k
Prenasalized	ᵐb ⟨mb⟩	ⁿd ⟨nd⟩	ᵑg ⟨ngg⟩
Fricative	f	s	h
Nasal	m	n	ŋ ⟨ng⟩
Approximant	w	r, l	j ⟨y⟩

- The prenasalized consonants are only found intervocalically.
- /f/ has only been found in three words.

Vowels
	Front	Central	Back
High	i		u
Mid-high	e		o
Mid-low			ʌ ⟨á⟩
Low		a	

- /e/ is pronounced [ɛ] in closed syllables ending in /t/, and [eʌ] when followed by /k/.

Additionally, the following diphthongs have been observed: /ei/, /iu/, /ʌi/, /ʌe/, /ʌu/, /oe/, /ui/.
