= Nuk language =

Finisterre languages of Papua New Guinea

Nuk
- Native to: Papua New Guinea
- Region: Morobe Province
- Native speakers: 900 (2006)
- Language family: Trans–New Guinea: Finisterre–Huon; Finisterre; Erap; Nuk

Language codes
- ISO 639-3: noc
- Glottolog: nukk1240

Nuk is one of the Finisterre languages of Papua New Guinea.
