= Uri language =

Fininsterre language spoken in Papua New Guinea

Uri
- Erap
- Native to: Papua New Guinea
- Region: Morobe Province
- Native speakers: (2,500 cited 1991)
- Language family: Trans–New Guinea: Finisterre–Huon; Finisterre; Erap; Uri

Language codes
- ISO 639-3: uvh
- Glottolog: urii1240

Uri (Urii), or Erap, is one of the Finisterre languages of Papua New Guinea.

== Names ==
The alternate names for Uri are Erap, Uri Vehees and Urii.
