= Guya language =

Finisterre languages of Papua New Guinea

Guya
- Guiarak
- Native to: Papua New Guinea
- Region: Madang Province
- Native speakers: (130 cited 1981)
- Language family: Trans–New Guinea: Finisterre–Huon; Finisterre; Warup; Guya

Language codes
- ISO 639-3: gka
- Glottolog: guya1251
- ELP: Guya

Guya (Guiarak) is one of the Finisterre languages of Papua New Guinea.
