= Finisterre languages =

Language family of Papua New Guinea

Finisterre
- Geographic distribution: Finisterre Range, New Guinea
- Linguistic classification: Trans–New Guinea: Finisterre–Huon; Finisterre
- Subdivisions: Erap; Gusap–Mot; Uruwa; Wantoat; Warup; Yupna

Language codes
- Glottolog: fini1245

The Finisterre languages are a language family, spoken in the Finisterre Range of Papua New Guinea, classified within the original Trans–New Guinea (TNG) proposal, and William A. Foley considers their TNG identity to be established. They share with the Huon languages a small closed class of verbs taking pronominal object prefixes some of which are cognate across both families (Suter 2012), strong morphological evidence that they are related.

The most populous Finisterre languages are Wantoat, Rawa, and Yopno, with about 10,000 speakers apiece, and Iyo, with about half that number.

== Internal structure ==
Huon and Finisterre, and then the connection between them, were identified by Kenneth McElhanon (1967, 1970). They are clearly valid language families. Finisterre contains six clear branches. Beyond that, classification is based on lexicostatistics, which does not provide precise classification results. The outline below follows McElhanon and Carter et al. (2012).

- Finisterre family
  - Erap branch
    - Boana: Nuk–Nek, Nakama, Numanggang, Munkip
    - Finongan, Gusan, Mamaa
    - Nimi, Sauk (Ma Manda), Uri
  - Gusap–Mot branch
    - Madi (Gira), Neko, Nekgini
    - Ngaing, Rawa, Ufim, Iyo (Nahu)
  - Uruwa branch: Sakam (Kutong) – Som, Nukna (Komutu), Yau, ?Weliki
  - Wantoat branch: Awara–Wantoat (Yagawak, Bam), Tuma-Irumu
  - Warup branch: Asaro'o (Morafa) – Molet, Bulgebi, Degenan–Tandɨ (Yagomi), Forak, Guya (Guiarak), Gwahatike (Dahating), Muratayak (Asat)
  - Yupna branch: Domung–Ma (Mebu), Nankina, Bonkiman–Yopno (Kewieng, Wandabong, Nokopo, Isan), ?Yout Wam

== Vocabulary comparison ==
The following basic vocabulary words are from McElhanon & Voorhoeve (1970) and Retsema et al. (2009), as cited in the Trans-New Guinea database:

| | Erap branch | | Gusap-Mot branch | Uruwa branch | Wantoat branch | Warup branch | Yupna branch |
| gloss | Mungkip | Uri (Sintogoro dialect) | Iyo | Yau (Mup dialect) | Tuma-Irumu (Irumu dialect) | Degenan | Yopno (Nokopo dialect) |
|---|---|---|---|---|---|---|---|
| head | kʰige | dimin | kemba | kuwit | kʌyi | tʌnam | busuŋʌ |
| hair | sɨsa; sɪsa | sɨsɑ | hu | dzioŋ | pundzi | gɔt | daŋwai |
| ear | maget; magitnɛ | mɑgi | ɔsumbi | ɔndɔm | sukun | nʌm | kɔsim |
| eye | dae; da·ge | de | tɔŋi | dan | dapur | dabəl | daƀʌl |
| nose | miminɛ; mimiŋge | kininiʔ | umi | tanma | inami | | tomoni |
| tooth | ma | | miti | man | men | mɛn | gɛn |
| tongue | mabɛm; mabim | mɨmbɛm | mipi | motbin | mɛmber | mɛlɛ | mel |
| leg | kada | kʌjoŋ | | | | | |
| louse | mi; mīŋ | tumuŋ | imi | imon | imʌn | iməŋ | iat |
| dog | sap | kuɣɔŋ | isa | sap | aŋ | umʌt | noŋkwak |
| pig | kare | | | | | | |
| bird | jāŋ | jɑŋ | nũ | | | | |
| egg | qiliq | | | | | | |
| blood | we·q | ʌmɑ | | | | | |
| bone | kwadi; kwadzi | kʌti: | wimbi | kurat | konzar | doruk; ʌtʌt | kataar |
| skin | girim | fugu | kowi | gib | gup; kʌndʌp | meᵲ- | gʌp; kandap |
| breast | nom | nʌm | susu | mum | nonoŋ | mum | naŋ |
| tree | bɛm | fɨɾi | | | | | |
| man | mɛ | ʌmi | | amna | ama | | amen |
| woman | tam | tɑmin | pare | ɔƀi | | | |
| sun | maim; male | mɑjɛm | okisa | sep | kɔmi | ɔm | doran |
| moon | jaʁip | mɑjɛp | | | | | |
| water | ime; imɛ | ɑmɑ | sono | yamo | ome | ɩm | kʌlap |
| fire | kuduk; kugup | kudip | te | ibdi | kʌndʌp | ɛřap | kandap |
| stone | qawade | gʷunʌgʌm | | | | | |
| road, path | tɛlɛ; tɛrɛpmēŋ | kʌdʌpʌŋ | ore | amsap | kandet | mar̃ʌn | kosit |
| name | buŋām; wow | wɔp | owe | man | wop | maŋgi | mai |
| eat | nʌna | | ne | na | na | na | na |
| one | kubugaŋ | kubinik | | | | | |
| two | lifɛt | fʌmɑʔ | | | | | |

== Bibliography ==
- Ross, Malcolm (2005). "Pronouns as a preliminary diagnostic for grouping Papuan languages". In Andrew Pawley; Robert Attenborough; Robin Hide; Jack Golson (eds.). Papuan pasts: cultural, linguistic and biological histories of Papuan-speaking peoples. Canberra: Pacific Linguistics. pp. 15–66. doi:10.15144/PL-572. ISBN 0858835622. OCLC 67292782.
- Suter, Edgar (2012). Verbs with pronominal object prefixes in Finisterre-Huon languages. In: Harald Hammarström and Wilco van den Heuvel (eds.). History, contact and classification of Papuan languages. [Special Issue 2012 of Language and Linguistics in Melanesia]. 23-58. Port Moresby: Linguistic Society of Papua New Guinea.
- Claassen, Oren R. and Kenneth A. McElhanon. 1970. Languages of the Finisterre Range. Papers in New Guinea Linguistics No. 11, 45–78. Caberra: Pacific Linguistics.
- Carter, John, Katie Carter, John Grummitt, Bonnie MacKenzie and Janell Masters. 2012. A Sociolinguistic Survey of the Mur Village Vernaculars. Dallas: SIL International. [Survey of Warup languages]
- Smith, Geoffrey P. 1988. Morobe counting systems. Papers in New Guinea Linguistics No. 26, 1–132.
