= Forak language =

Finisterre language of Papua New Guinea

Forak
- Fo
- Native to: Papua New Guinea
- Region: Madang Province
- Native speakers: 280 (2003)
- Language family: Trans–New Guinea: Finisterre–Huon; Finisterre; Warup; Forak

Language codes
- ISO 639-3: frq
- Glottolog: fora1245

Forak ('Fo village') is one of the Finisterre languages of Papua New Guinea. It is spoken in Mamgak village (5.716928°S 146.553458°E) of Rai Coast Rural LLG, Madang Province.
