= Mebu language =

Finisterre languages of Papua New Guinea

Ma
- Mebu
- Native to: Papua New Guinea
- Region: Morobe Province
- Native speakers: 570 (2003)
- Language family: Trans–New Guinea: Finisterre–Huon; Finisterre; Yupna; Ma

Language codes
- ISO 639-3: mjn
- Glottolog: mapa1244

Ma (Ma Wam), or Mebu, is one of the Finisterre languages of Papua New Guinea. It is spoken in Mibu (5.801486°S 146.380221°E) and Tariknan (5.789888°S 146.416829°E) villages of Rai Coast Rural LLG, Madang Province.
