= Finongan language =

Finisterre languages of Papua New Guinea

Finongan
- Finungwa
- Native to: Papua New Guinea
- Region: Morobe Province
- Native speakers: 1,140 (2006)
- Language family: Trans–New Guinea: Finisterre–Huon; Finisterre; Erap; Finongan

Language codes
- ISO 639-3: fag
- Glottolog: fino1238

Finongan is one of the Finisterre languages of Papua New Guinea.

== Names ==
The alternate names for Finongan are Finungwa and Finungwan.

== Phonology ==
The phonology of Finongan is as follows:

Consonants
		Labial	Coronal	Velar	Labiovelar	Uvular/Glottal
Nasal		/m/ ⟨m⟩	/n/ ⟨n⟩	/ŋ/ ⟨ng⟩		
Stops	Voiceless	/p/ ⟨p⟩	/t/ ⟨t⟩	/k/ ⟨k⟩	/kʷ/ ⟨kw⟩	
Stops	Voiced	/b/ ⟨b⟩	/d/ ⟨d⟩	/g/ ⟨g⟩		/ʔ/ ⟨c⟩
Fricative		/f/ ⟨f⟩	/s/ ⟨s⟩			/ʁ/ ⟨h⟩
Tap/Flap			/ɾ/ ⟨l⟩			
Approximant			/j/ ⟨y⟩		/w/ ⟨w⟩	

- The voiceless labial, coronal, and non-labialized velar stops 'p', 't', and 'k' are all unreleased syllable-finally

Vowels
		Front	Center	Back
Close	Short	/i/ ⟨i⟩		/u/ ⟨u⟩
Close	Long	/iː/ ⟨ii⟩		/uː/ ⟨uu⟩
Mid	Short	/ɛ/ ⟨e⟩		/ɔ/ ⟨o⟩
Mid	Long	/ɛː/ ⟨ee⟩		/ɔː/ ⟨oo⟩
Open	Diphthong		ai ⟨ai⟩	
Open	Short		/a/ ⟨a⟩	
Open	Long		/aː/ ⟨aa⟩	

- In multisyllabic words, 'i' is pronounced /ɪ/ preceding another 'i'

- Several diphthongs can occur over syllable breaks
