= Samoan Sign Language =

Deaf sign language of Samoa

- Native to: Samoa
- Language family: BANZSL: Australian Sign Language?; Samoan Sign Language

Language codes
- ISO 639-3: None (mis)
- Glottolog: None
- IETF: asf-WS

Samoan Sign Language is the deaf sign language of Samoa.

Much Samoan Sign Language is based on Australian Sign Language, though there are local signs for Samoan food. It's not clear if this means Samoan Sign Language is related to Australian Sign Language, or if it merely has many loanwords from Australian Sign Language.

A short dictionary has been compiled for Samoan Sign Language, and evidently a separate dictionary has been compiled for American Samoan Sign Language. "American Samoan Sign Language" may just be American Sign Language as used in American Samoa.
