= Ma Manda language =

Finisterre language of Papua New Guinea

Sauk
- Ma Manda
- Native to: Papua New Guinea
- Region: Morobe Province
- Native speakers: 1,600 (2018)
- Language family: Trans–New Guinea: Finisterre–Huon; Finisterre; Erap; Sauk

Language codes
- ISO 639-3: skc
- Glottolog: sauk1252

Sauk, or Ma Manda, is one of the Finisterre languages of Papua New Guinea.

A detailed grammar of the language was published by Ryan Pennington in 2016.

== Grammar ==
=== Switch-reference ===
Ma Manda has a switch-reference system in which verbal suffixes on non-final verbs in a clause chain indicate whether the subject of the following clause is the same as or different from the current subject. The same-subject suffix is -ka (SS) and the different-subject suffix is -ng (DS).

kadet men=nang ba-ka ngat-ng-tnang tandonta-go-k
road mouth=LOC come-SS be-DS-1NSG night-RP-3SG
'While we were coming on the main road, (it) became night.'

In this example, the same-subject suffix -ka on ba ('come') indicates that its subject is identical to that of ngat ('be'). The different-subject suffix -ng on ngat signals that the subject changes before the following impersonal clause tandonta-go-k ('it became night').
