= Asaro'o language =

Finisterre language spoken in Papua New Guinea

Asaro'o
- Morafa
- Native to: Papua New Guinea
- Region: Madang Province
- Native speakers: 1,300 (2003)
- Language family: Trans–New Guinea: Finisterre–Huon; Finisterre; Warup; Asaro'o

Language codes
- ISO 639-3: mtv
- Glottolog: mole1240

Asaro'o, or Morafa, is one of the Finisterre languages of Papua New Guinea. Molet may be a dialect or a closely related language.
