= Muratayak language =

Finisterre language spoken in Papua New Guinea

Muratayak
- Asat, Aset
- Native to: Papua New Guinea
- Region: Madang Province
- Native speakers: 1,100 (2003)
- Language family: Trans–New Guinea: Finisterre–Huon; Finisterre; Warup; Muratayak

Language codes
- ISO 639-3: asx
- Glottolog: mura1271 Muratayak

Muratayak, also Asat, is one of the Finisterre languages of Papua New Guinea. There is no overall name; speakers variously use Muratayak, Asat and Aset. These names do not correspond consistently to dialects or even specific villages.
