= Guyanese Sign Language =

Deaf sign language of Guyana

- Native to: Guyana
- Language family: American Sign Language

Language codes
- ISO 639-3: None (mis)
- Glottolog: guya1253

Guyanese Sign Language is the deaf sign language of Guyana. Little information is available. Since American Sign Language is used for education in Guyana, "Guyanese Sign Language" may simply be the local name for ASL.
