= Nek language =

Finisterre language of Papua New Guinea

Nek
- Native to: Papua New Guinea
- Region: Morobe Province
- Native speakers: 2,000 (2011)
- Language family: Trans–New Guinea: Finisterre–Huon; Finisterre; Erap; Nek
- Writing system: Latin Script

Language codes
- ISO 639-3: nif
- Glottolog: nekk1240

The Nek language is a language spoken by the Nek people in the Morobe Province of Papua New Guinea. The Nek language has two dialects, eastern and western and it is a Finisterre language.
