= Qoqmončaq language =

Mixed language spoken in China

Qoqmončaq
- Region: Xinjiang-Uyghur Autonomous Region, People's Republic of China
- Native speakers: (200 cited 1995)
- Language family: Kazakh–Mongolian–Evenki mixed language

Language codes
- ISO 639-3: None (mis)
- Glottolog: None

Qoqmončaq is a mixed language based on Kazakh, Mongolian, and Evenki, spoken by about 200 people in the Xinjiang Uyghur Autonomous Region of the People's Republic of China. The language is related with Tuvan, Tofa, Soyot and Tsengel.
