= Gira language =

Finisterre language of Papua New Guinea

Madi
- Gira
- Native to: Papua New Guinea
- Region: Madang Province
- Native speakers: 380 (2003)
- Language family: Trans–New Guinea: Finisterre–Huon; Finisterre; Gusap–Mot; Madi

Language codes
- ISO 639-3: grg
- Glottolog: madi1261
- ELP: Madi

Gira, or Madi (Girara), is one of the Finisterre languages of Papua New Guinea. Alternative names for Gira are Girara, Madi, and Gorovu.

== Bibliography ==
- Cicero, Edwaldo (1995), Madi wordlist
- Claassen, Oren R.; McElhanon, Kenneth A. (1970). "Languages of the Finisterre Range" (PDF). Papers in New Guinea Linguistics 11. Pacific Linguistics: Series A. Vol. 23. Canberra: Research School of Pacific and Asian Studies, Australian National University. pp. 45–78. A brief overview of the Gira language is found on p. 50.
