= Mamaa language =

Finisterre language of Papua New Guinea

Mamaa
- Native to: Papua New Guinea
- Region: Morobe Province
- Native speakers: (12 cited 2000)
- Language family: Trans–New Guinea: Finisterre–Huon; Finisterre; Erap; Mamaa

Language codes
- ISO 639-3: mhf
- Glottolog: mama1277
- ELP: Mamaa

Mamaa, or Mama, is one of the Finisterre languages of Papua New Guinea, spoken in the village of Mama (6.508642°S 146.52749°E) in Wampar Rural LLG, Morobe Province.
