= Luo–Guang Yue =

Yue Chinese dialect of Guangxi, China

Luo-Guang
- 羅廣方言
- Native to: China
- Region: Guangdong
- Language family: Sino-Tibetan: Sinitic; Chinese; Yue; Luo-Guang

Language codes
- ISO 639-3: None (mis)
- Glottolog: None
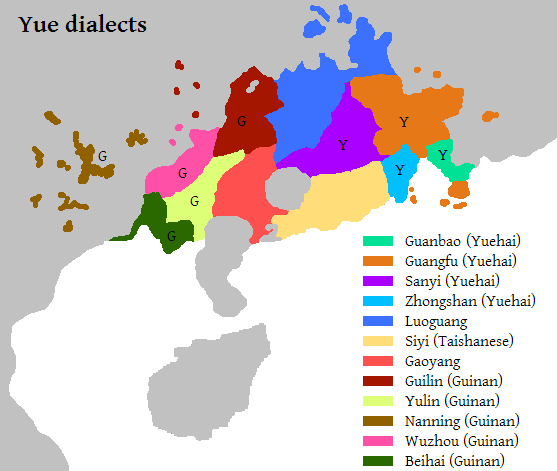
- Luo-Guang is at the top, in blue.

Luo–Guang (羅廣方言, Jyutping: lo4 gwong2 fong1 jin4) is a northern branch of Yue Chinese spoken in Guangxi province.

== Dialects ==
Luoding dialect is representative.

- Luoding dialect
- Zhaoqing dialect
- Sihui dialect
- Yangshan dialect
- Lianzhou dialect
- Lianshan dialect
- Qingyuan dialect
