= Neko language =

Finisterre language of Papua New Guinea

Neko
- Native to: Papua New Guinea
- Region: Madang Province
- Native speakers: (640 cited 2000 census)
- Language family: Trans–New Guinea: Finisterre–Huon; Finisterre; Gusap–Mot; Neko

Language codes
- ISO 639-3: nej
- Glottolog: neko1240

Neko is one of the Finisterre languages of Papua New Guinea, spoken in a single village in Madang Province.

== Names ==
The alternate names for Neko are Bedawi and Beja.
