= Nakama language =

Finisterre language of Papua New Guinea

Nakama
- Native to: Papua New Guinea
- Region: Morobe Province
- Native speakers: 1,600 (2006)
- Language family: Trans–New Guinea: Finisterre–Huon; Finisterre; Erap; Nakama

Language codes
- ISO 639-3: nib
- Glottolog: naka1264

Nakama is an endangered indigenous language of Papua New Guinea that is part of the Finisterre family. The language is used as a first language by adults in its community but not by all young people and it is not known to be taught in schools.
