= Nema language =

Finisterre language spoken in Papua New Guinea

Nema
- Gusan
- Native to: Papua New Guinea
- Region: Morobe Province
- Native speakers: (800 cited 2000 census)
- Language family: Trans–New Guinea: Finisterre–Huon; Finisterre; Erap; Nema

Language codes
- ISO 639-3: gsn
- Glottolog: gusa1246

Nema, a.k.a. Gusan, is one of the Finisterre languages of Papua New Guinea. Speakers use the name "Nema"; "Gusan" is found in the literature. A language survey team visited the area and reported that the name "Nema" is locally known, though "Gusan" had been used to refer to the language by some linguistic publications in the past.
