= Nekgini language =

Language

Nekgini
- Native to: Papua New Guinea
- Region: Madang Province
- Native speakers: (430 cited 1981)
- Language family: Trans–New Guinea: Finisterre–Huon; Finisterre; Gusap–Mot; Nekgini

Language codes
- ISO 639-3: nkg
- Glottolog: nekg1240

Nekgini, one of the Finisterre languages of Papua New Guinea, is spoken in a single village in Madang Province.
