= Finisterre–Huon languages =

Trans–New Guinea language family

Finisterre–Huon
- Geographic distribution: Finisterre Range and Huon Peninsula, Morobe Province, Papua New Guinea
- Linguistic classification: Trans–New Guinea: Finisterre–Huon
- Subdivisions: Finisterre; Huon

Language codes
- Glottolog: fini1244
- Map: The Finisterre–Huon languages of New Guinea The Finisterre–Huon languages Other Trans–New Guinea languages Other Papuan languages Austronesian languages Uninhabited

The Finisterre–Huon languages comprise the largest family within the Trans–New Guinea languages (TNG) in the classification of Malcolm Ross. They were part of the original TNG proposal, and William A. Foley considers their TNG identity to be established. The languages share a small closed class of verbs taking pronominal object prefixes some of which are cognate (Suter 2012), strong morphological evidence that they are related.

== History of classification ==
Huon and Finisterre, and then the connection between them, were identified by Kenneth McElhanon (1967, 1970). When McElhanon compared notes with his colleague Clemens Voorhoeve, who was working on the languages of southern Irian Jaya, they developed the concept of Trans–New Guinea. Apart from the evidence which unites them, the Finisterre and Huon families are clearly valid language families in their own right, each consisting of several fairly-well defined branches.

== Pronouns ==
Ross (2005) reconstructs the pronouns as follows:

| | sg | du | pl |
|---|---|---|---|
| 1 | *na | *na-t, *ni-t | *na-n, *n-in |
| 2 | *ga | *ja-ł, *ji-ł, *gi-ł | *ja-n, *ji-n, *gi-n |
| 3 | *[y]a, *wa, *i | *ya-ł, *i-ł | *ya-n, *i-n |

These are not all coherent: 3sg *ya and *i are found in Huon, for example, while 3sg *wa is found in Finisterre. In other cases, however, the multiple forms are found in both branches.

== Vocabulary comparison ==
The following basic vocabulary words are from McElhanon & Voorhoeve (1970) and McElhanon (1967), as cited in the Trans-New Guinea database.

The words cited constitute translation equivalents, whether they are cognate (e.g. hɔme, samo for “nose”) or not (e.g. mic-, sot, dzɔŋɔ for “tooth”). Notice the very low number of cognate triplets, or even pairs, among these languages.

| gloss | Kâte | Selepet | Kovai |
|---|---|---|---|
| head | kpitsec- | kun; kun- | buno |
| hair | dzâwâ- | somot; somot- | |
| ear | hatsec- | âdâp-; ɔndɔp | ano |
| eye | dzâŋe- | sen; sen- | dziŋo |
| nose | sâke- | hâme-; hɔme | samo |
| tooth | mic- | sât-; sot | dzɔŋɔ |
| tongue | nameŋ- | nibilam-; nimbilam | biŋio |
| louse | imeŋ | imen | apalau |
| dog | kpâto | soso | goun |
| bird | wipe | nâi; nɔi | naŋ |
| blood | soc- | hep- | |
| bone | siec- | haǥit; hahit- | yo |
| skin | sahac- | hâk-; hɔk | siŋlo |
| breast | moŋ- | nam; nam- | suyo |
| tree | yâc | nak | |
| man | ŋic | lok | |
| woman | ŋokac | apet; ibi | |
| sky | sambâŋ | hibim | |
| sun | dzoaŋ | dewutâ; dewutɔ | sual |
| moon | mosa | emesenŋe | |
| water | opâ | to | lap |
| fire | | kɔlɔp | puŋ |
| stone | kpânâ | kât; kɔt | |
| road, path | hata | giop | atam |
| name | dzâne- | kut; kut- | |
| eat | nâ- | ne; ni- | |
| one | mocyaha | konok | |
| two | yayahec | yâhâp | |

== Evolution ==
Finisterre-Huon reflexes of proto-Trans-New Guinea (pTNG) etyma are:

Kâte language:

- bɔruŋ ‘flame’ < *mbalaŋ ‘flame’
- butoŋ ‘fingernail’ < *mb(i,u)t(i,u)C
- bekɔ ‘orphan’ < *mbVŋga(-masi)
- masiŋ ‘widow’ < *masi
- sambɔŋ ‘sky’ < *sambV ‘cloud’
- tofeʔ ‘saliva’ < *si(mb,p)atV
- lo- ‘take’ < *(nd,t)a-
- munduŋ ‘inner yolk of egg’ < *mundun ‘internal organs’
- go ‘2sg’ < *ŋga
- hɔmo- ‘die’ < *kumV-
- bɔriʔ ‘glitter, flash of lightning’ < *(m,mb)elak ‘light, lightning’
- mi ‘not’ < *ma- ‘not’
- maŋu(zo) ‘to vomit’ < *mV(k,ŋ)V t(e,i)-
- ame(ʔ) ‘breast’ < *amu
- tsimin(uŋ) ‘stiff coarse hair’ < *[nd,s]umu[n,t]V ‘hair’
- imeŋ ‘louse’ < *iman ‘louse’
- no ‘1sg’ < *na ‘1sg’
- nɔ- ‘eat’ < *na-

Selepet language:

- balam ‘flame’ < *mbalaŋ
- (ni)bilim ‘tongue’ < *mbilaŋ
- kɔlɔp ‘fire’ < *kend(o,u)p
- kɔlip ‘long’ < *kuta(mb,p)(a,u)
- irak ‘new’ < *kVtak
- sak ‘sand’ < *sa(ŋg,k)asin
- somot ‘hair’ < *(s,nd)umu(n,t)[V]
- madu ‘orphan’ < *masi
- si- ‘burn’ < *nj(a,e,i)- ‘burn’
- ga ‘2sg’ < *ŋga
- kaku- ‘carry on shoulder’ < *kakV-
- kɔu ‘ashes’ < *kambu ‘ashes’
- belek ‘lightning’ < *(m,mb)elak
- ibi ‘name’ < *imbi
- mete ‘forehead’ < *me(n,t)e ‘head’
- man- ‘live, dwell’ < *mVn[a]-
- imen ‘louse’ < *iman ‘louse’
- (n)am ‘breast, milk’ < *amu ‘breast’
