= Long-nosed echymipera =

Conservation status
- Least Concern (IUCN 3.1)

Scientific classification
- Kingdom: Animalia
- Phylum: Chordata
- Class: Mammalia
- Infraclass: Marsupialia
- Order: Peramelemorphia
- Family: Peramelidae
- Genus: Echymipera
- Species: E. rufescens

Binomial name
- Echymipera rufescens (Peters & Doria, 1875)
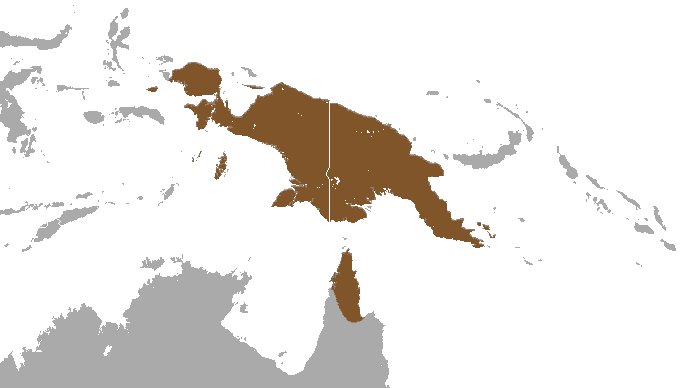
- Long-nosed echymipera range

Species of marsupial

The long-nosed echymipera (Echymipera rufescens), or long-nosed spiny bandicoot, is a species of marsupial in the family Peramelidae. It is found in Australia, Indonesia, and Papua New Guinea. Its natural habitat is subtropical or tropical dry forests.

== Vernacular names ==
Vernacular names for E. rufescens in various Aru languages of the Aru Islands in far eastern Indonesia:

- Ujir: koa
- Kola: koyi
- Dobel: ʔosi
- Batuley: koyi
- Manumbai: kagaran
- Goda-Goda: kawaran
- Lorang: kagwaran
- Koba: ngarukwabala
- West Tarangan: man
