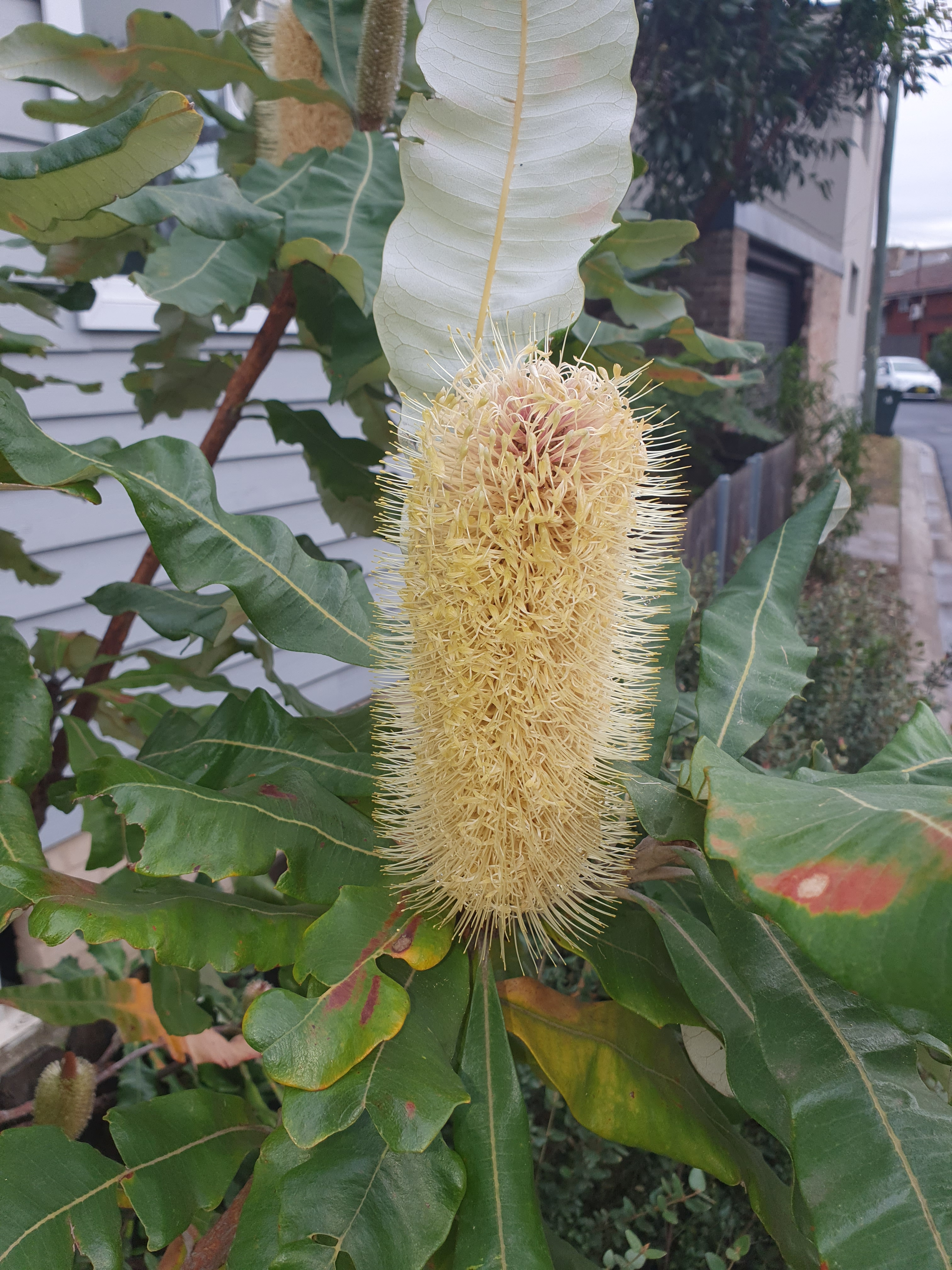

Conservation status
- Least Concern (IUCN 3.1)

Scientific classification
- Kingdom: Plantae
- Clade: Tracheophytes
- Clade: Angiosperms
- Clade: Eudicots
- Order: Proteales
- Family: Proteaceae
- Genus: Banksia
- Species: B. dentata

Binomial name
- Banksia dentata L.f.
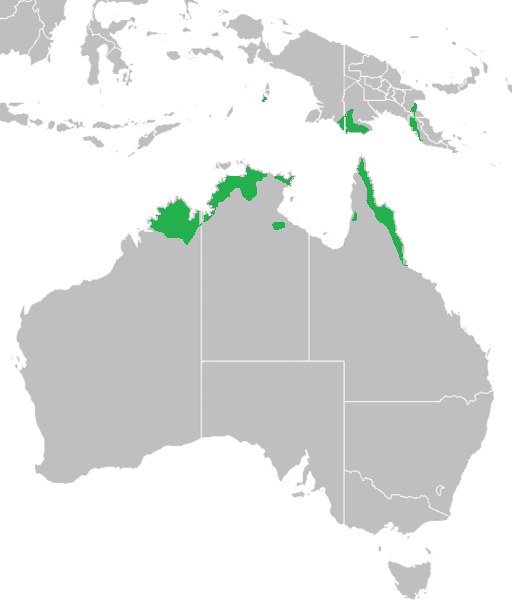
- Range across northern Australia, southern New Guinea and Aru Islands (Trangan)

Synonyms
- Banksia procumbens (Dum.Cours.); Isostylis dentata ((L.f.) Britten); Sirmuellera dentata ((L.f.) Kuntze)

= Banksia dentata =

Species of tree

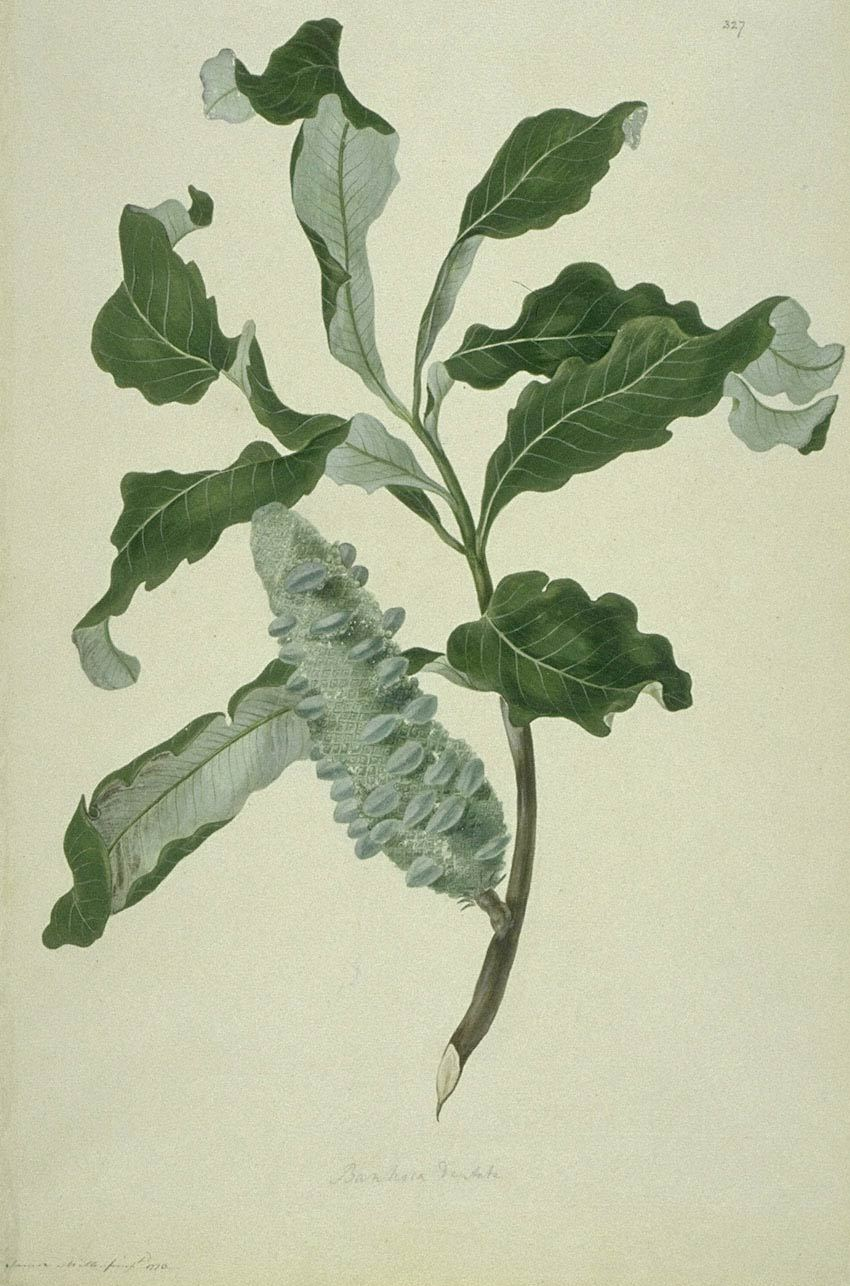
Banksia dentata watercolour by Sydney Parkinson

Banksia dentata, commonly known as the tropical banksia, is a species of tree in the family Proteaceae. It occurs across northern Australia, southern New Guinea and the Aru Islands. Growing as a gnarled tree to 7 m (23 ft) high, it has large green leaves up to 22 cm (8.7 in) long with dentate margins. The cylindrical yellow inflorescences, up to 13 cm (5.1 in) high, appear between November and May, attracting various species of honeyeaters, sunbirds, the sugar glider and a variety of insects. Flowers fall off the ageing spikes, which swell and develop follicles containing up to two viable seeds each.

Banksia dentata is one of four Banksia species collected by Sir Joseph Banks in 1770, and one of the four species published in 1782 as part of Carolus Linnaeus the Younger's original description of Banksia. Within the genus, it is classified in the series Salicinae, a group of species from Australia's eastern states. Genetic studies show it is a basal member within the group. Banksia dentata is found in tropical grassland known as savanna, and associated with Pandanus and Melaleuca. It regenerates from bushfire by regrowing from its woody base, known as a lignotuber.

== Description ==
The tropical banksia is generally a small tree which grows to around 4 m (13 ft) or sometimes up to 7 m (23 ft) tall, with a rough stocky trunk, spreading crown, and crooked branches. The dark grey bark is not flaky but tessellated in texture and appearance. Initially covered in reddish hair that wears away, branchlets become smooth and grey with age. The large green leaves are scattered along the stems, and more crowded at the branchlet tips. They are 9–22 cm (3.5–8.7 in) long and 2–9 cm (0.8–3.5 in) wide, obovate in shape with mucronate tips. The dentate margins are lined irregularly with 0.1–1.3 cm (0.04–0.5 in) long teeth, separated by U-shaped sinuses. The leaves are undulate with white undersurfaces, and the midrib is raised underneath and depressed above. The cylindrical yellow inflorescences arise from one- to three-year-old branches. Appearing between November and May, they are 10 to 13 cm (3.9 to 5.1 in) high and 5 to 10 cm (2.0 to 3.9 in) wide. Newly opened flower spikes smell like corn. All flower parts are pale yellow; the perianth is 2.5–3.2 cm (1.0–1.3 in) long, including a 0.5 cm (0.2 in) long limb. After anthesis, the pistil is 3.1–4.6 cm (1.2–1.8 in) long. Flower parts soon fall off ageing spikes, which develop into irregular-cylindrical infructescences. The oval follicles are 1.5–2 cm (0.6–0.8 in) long, 0.4–0.8 cm (0.16–0.31 in) high and 0.5–0.8 cm (0.2–0.3 in) wide. Pale green and furry when young, they become smooth and pale brown with age. The follicles open spontaneously with maturity. They contain two seeds each, between which lies a woody dark brown separator of similar shape to the seeds. Measuring 1.8–2.1 cm (0.7–0.8 in) in length, the seed is obovate, and composed of a dark brown 1.1–1.4 cm (0.4–0.6 in) wide membranous 'wing' and obovate seed proper, which measures 1.0–1.2 cm (0.4–0.5 in) long by 0.5–0.8 cm (0.2–0.3 in) wide. The seed surface can be smooth or covered in tiny ridges.

The bright green cotyledons are obovate, measuring 1.6–1.9 cm (0.6–0.7 in) long by 0.8–1.1 cm (0.3–0.4 in) wide. At the base of each are two pointed auricles around 1.5 mm (0.06 in) long. The cotyledons arise from a 3–4 mm (0.12–0.16 in) high smooth hypocotyl that is 1–1.5 mm (0.04–0.06 in) in diameter. The subsequent seedling leaves are opposite initially, arising 3–4 mm above the cotyledons. Each is roughly linear in shape, measuring 2.5–2.7 cm (1.0–1.1 in) long and 0.4–0.5 cm (0.16–0.20 in) wide, with two to three serrations ("teeth") on the upper quarter to third of the leaf margin's length. The leaf undersurface is covered with white hair. Successive leaves become more obovate and are 3–7 cm (1.2–2.8 in) long and 0.8–1.2 cm (0.3–0.5 in) wide, with dentate margins and mucronate tips. Seedling stems are hairy.

== Taxonomy ==
Specimens of Banksia dentata were collected from the vicinity of the Endeavour River somewhere between 17 June and 3 August 1770 by Joseph Banks and Daniel Solander, naturalists on the Endeavour during Lieutenant (later Captain) James Cook's first voyage to the Pacific Ocean. Solander coined the (unpublished) binomial name Leucadendrum (later Leucadendron) dentatum in Banks' Florilegium. However, the formal description of the species was not published until April 1782, when Carolus Linnaeus the Younger described the first four Banksia species in his Supplementum Plantarum. Linnaeus distinguished them by their leaf shapes, and named them accordingly. Thus this species' dentate leaf margins saw it given the specific name dentata, the Latin adjective for 'toothed'. Banksia dentata is monotypic, and no subspecies are recognised. Though not closely studied, reports suggest it does not vary significantly over its range.

Robert Brown recorded 31 species of Banksia in his 1810 work Prodromus Florae Novae Hollandiae et Insulae Van Diemen, and in his taxonomic arrangement placed the taxon in the subgenus Banksia verae, the "True Banksias", because the inflorescence is a typical Banksia flower spike. By the time Carl Meissner published his 1856 arrangement of the genus, there were 58 described Banksia species. Meissner divided Brown's Banksia verae, which had been renamed Eubanksia by Stephan Endlicher in 1847, into four series based on leaf properties. He placed B. dentata in the series Quercinae (the oak-like banksias).

In 1870, George Bentham published a thorough revision of Banksia in his Flora Australiensis. In Bentham's arrangement, the number of recognised Banksia species was reduced from 60 to 46. Bentham defined four sections based on leaf, style and pollen-presenter characters. Banksia dentata was placed in section Eubanksia alongside B. marginata and a broadly defined B. integrifolia.

In 1891, Otto Kuntze, in his Revisio Generum Plantarum, rejected the generic name Banksia L.f., on the grounds that the name Banksia had previously been published in 1776 as Banksia J.R.Forst & G.Forst, referring to the genus now known as Pimelea. Kuntze proposed Sirmuellera as an alternative, referring to this species as Sirmuellera dentata. For the same reason, James Britten transferred the species to the genus Isostylis as Isostylis dentata in 1905. These applications of the principle of priority were largely ignored, and Banksia L.f. was formally conserved and Sirmuellera rejected in 1940.

Commonly known as the tropical banksia, B. dentata is known locally as swamp banksia, and guibuk by the indigenous people in Kakadu National Park. Its local name in the Nunggubuyu language of eastern Arnhem Land is rilirdili. Other names from the same region include enindurrkwa in the Enindhilyagwa language of Groote Eylandt, and gulpu in the Rirratjingu language of Yirrkala. Frederick Manson Bailey reported in 1913 that the indigenous people of Cape Bedford knew it as kabir.

=== Placement within Banksia ===
The current taxonomic arrangement of the genus Banksia is based on botanist Alex George's 1999 monograph for the Flora of Australia book series. In this arrangement, B. dentata is placed in Banksia subgenus Banksia, because its inflorescences take the form of Banksia's characteristic flower spikes, section Banksia because of its straight styles, and series Salicinae because its inflorescences are cylindrical. There has been debate on which species it is most closely related to. Alf Salkin had noted that B. dentata displays characteristics which are primitive within the genus. Unlike southern banksias, it has small juvenile leaves and broad dentate adult leaves. Alex George concluded initially that its affinities lay with Banksia integrifolia on account of their similar inflorescences. In a morphological cladistic analysis published in 1994, Kevin Thiele placed it in the newly described subseries Acclives along with B. plagiocarpa, B. robur and B. oblongifolia within the series Salicinae. These four species all have follicles which point slightly upwards towards the apex of the flower spike. It was held to be most closely related to B. robur on account of its large undulate leaves. Salkin had also noted that the seedling leaves of B. dentata, B. robur and B. oblongifolia were all similar and roughly linear, suggesting a close relationship. However, this subgrouping of the Salicinae was not supported by George; he discounted a close relationship with B. robur, which he felt was too distinctive. B. dentata's placement within Banksia according to Flora of Australia is as follows:

Genus Banksia

Subgenus Isostylis
Subgenus Banksia

Section Oncostylis
Section Coccinea
Section Banksia

Series Grandes
Series Banksia
Series Crocinae
Series Prostratae
Series Cyrtostylis
Series Tetragonae
Series Bauerinae
Series Quercinae
Series Salicinae

B. dentata – B. aquilonia – B. integrifolia – B. plagiocarpa – B. oblongifolia – B. robur – B. conferta – B. paludosa – B. marginata – B. canei – B. saxicola

Since 1998, American botanist Austin Mast and co-authors have been publishing results of ongoing cladistic analyses of DNA sequence data for the subtribe Banksiinae, which then comprised genera Banksia and Dryandra. Their analyses suggest a phylogeny that differs greatly from George's taxonomic arrangement. Banksia dentata resolves as an early offshoot within the Salicinae. In 2007, Mast and Thiele rearranged the genus Banksia by merging Dryandra into it, and published B. subg. Spathulatae for the taxa having spoon-shaped cotyledons; thus B. subg. Banksia was redefined as encompassing taxa lacking spoon-shaped cotyledons. They foreshadowed publishing a full arrangement once DNA sampling of Dryandra was complete. In the meantime, if Mast and Thiele's nomenclatural changes are taken as an interim arrangement, B. dentata is placed in B. subg. Spathulatae.

== Distribution and habitat ==
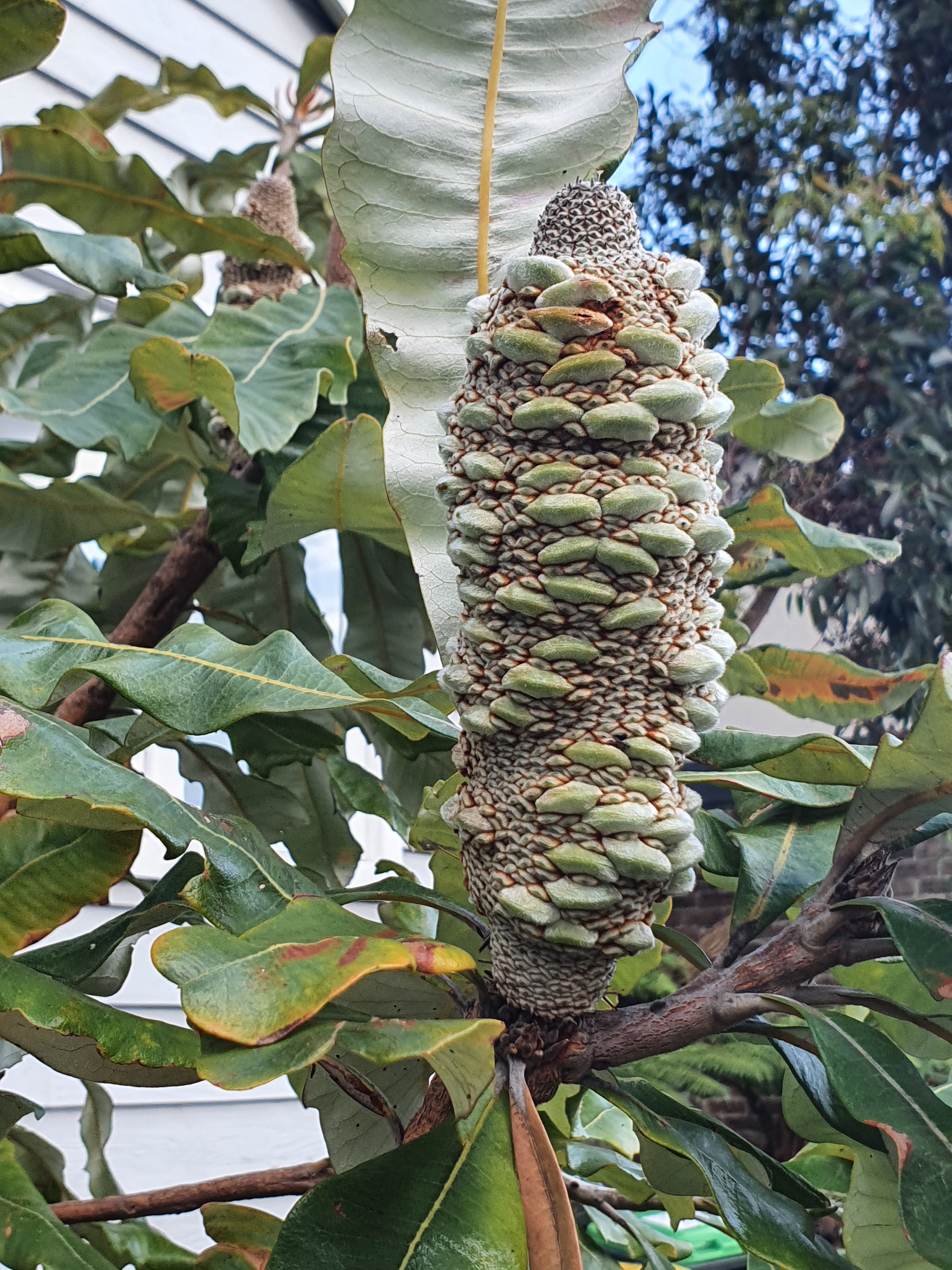
Developing follicles

Across northern Australia, Banksia dentata has been recorded as far west as the Wunaamin Miliwundi Ranges in the western Kimberley through the Northern Territory and extending south to Nitmiluk Gorge and into Queensland, where it is found on the Cape York Peninsula to as far south as Cooktown. Off the coast, it has been recorded from Groote Eylandt and the Wessel Islands, as well as Melville and Bathurst Islands. It also extends onto the Aru Islands, where it is found around Trangan, and New Guinea, where it ranges in the south from Merauke east to Port Moresby, and around Bulolo and Mount Mau. It is the only Banksia species not endemic to Australia. As much of its range is in remote and poorly surveyed country, it is possible that it is found more widely than has been recorded. Pollen samples indicate it has been present on the Torres Strait Islands over the past 8,000 years, though it has not been a prominent component of the island flora.

Banksia dentata generally grows on sandy soils in savanna woodland or shrubland, along freshwater swamps, watercourses, floodplains or other seasonally wet areas. It has also been found on rocky outcrops, of quartzite or sandstone, to an elevation of around 500 m (1,600 ft) in Australia, and up to 1,200 m (3,900 ft) in New Guinea. In New Guinea it is restricted to areas which have a distinct dry season.

Banksia dentata is often found with Melaleuca and Pandanus species. On Cape York, it is a dominant component in a low scrub known as "wet desert", due to its resemblance to arid scrub yet occurring in a monsoon climate. On phosphorus-poor soils, B. dentata is found with Melaleuca saligna and Thryptomene oligandra. On Melville Island it is a dominant component of Banksia low woodland, forming part of a 3–6 m (9.8–19.7 ft) high canopy with Melaleuca viridiflora; the understory is composed of sedges, such as Fimbristylis, Sorghum intrans, Eriachne, Germainia grandiflora and the restiad Dapsilanthus spathaceus, as well as suckering shrubs, Lophostemon lactifluus and Syzygium eucalyptoides. This community grows in wet areas, with a grey topsoil with high moisture and gravel content but low sand.

== Ecology ==
Banksia dentata responds to bushfire by resprouting from its woody lignotuber although, unlike other members of the Salicinae, it lacks dormant buds at its base. It was described by amateur botanist and banksia enthusiast Alf Salkin as resembling an "upturned parsnip". Plant communities where it is found are subject to periodic bushfires, and it can become more dominant if fires occur often.

Salkin had noted that its tropical position might mean that B. dentata was a key species in the transition from rainforest to open habitat in the ancestry of the genus. One adaptation to a drier sunnier climate was a thick intermediate layer under the epidermis in the leaf architecture. This layer, the hypodermis, contains large vacuoles that are filled with a phenolic compound, and seems to serve to reduce the intensity of sunlight reaching the mesophyll.

Numerous nectar-feeding insects are attracted to the flower spikes, which in turn attract honeyeaters, silvereyes and sunbirds, many of which consume both nectar and insects. The sugar glider (Petaurus breviceps) forages among the flower spikes and is a probable pollinator. The common blossom bat (Syconycteris australis) feeds on nectar. B. dentata has been recorded as a host plant for the mistletoe species Amyema benthamii, Decaisnina angustata and D. signata.

== Cultivation ==
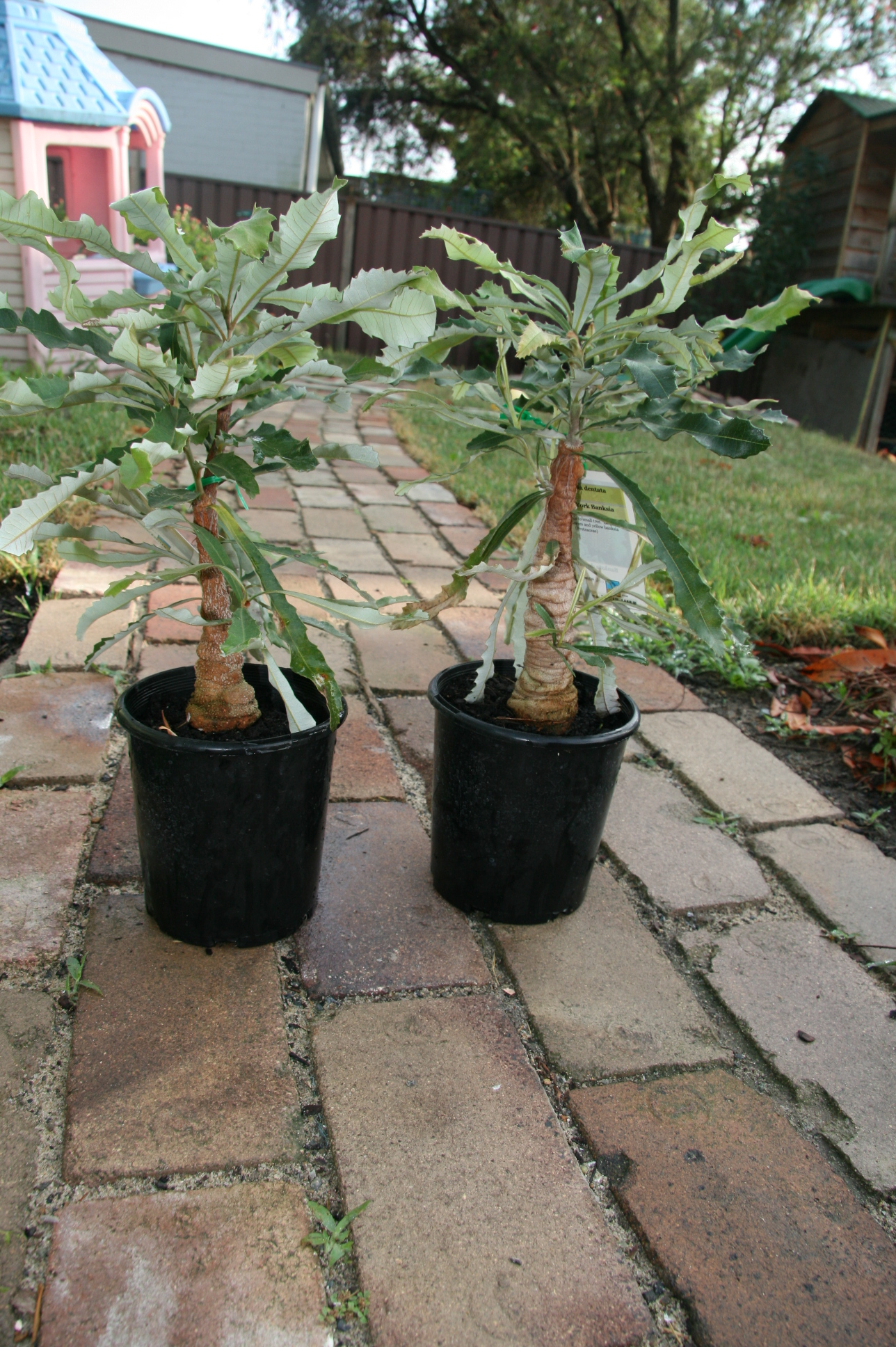
Seedlings, North Queensland

The tree's gnarled bark, large green leaves, and yellow flower spikes are attractive horticultural features. B. dentata is vulnerable to cold winters in cultivation in Melbourne and recovers over the hotter months of summer. It has not been grown in colder climates, such as those of Canberra. Flowering occurs around 5 to 8 years from seed. Plants can be pruned hard, and do best on a sandy slightly acid soil of pH 5.5–6.5. They can be vulnerable to borers. Seeds do not require any treatment, and take 32 to 40 days to germinate. B. dentata was introduced into the United Kingdom in 1822.

== Uses ==
Banksia dentata is used as a nectar source in the honey bee industry. Aboriginal people in the Northern Territory would light old seed cones and use them as firebrands, these lasting for up to two hours. The nectar was consumed by indigenous people. A hot smoking flower spike was used to cauterise leprosy sores, and people suffering from diarrhea would squat over smoking cones in the hope this would relieve their symptoms. The thin woody spikes that did not develop follicles were used as nasal ornaments by aboriginal women, and flower spikes were used as combs.
