= Decaisnina brittenii =

Scientific classification
- Kingdom: Plantae
- Clade: Tracheophytes
- Clade: Angiosperms
- Clade: Eudicots
- Order: Santalales
- Family: Loranthaceae
- Genus: Decaisnina
- Species: D. brittenii

Binomial name
- Decaisnina brittenii (Blakely) Barlow
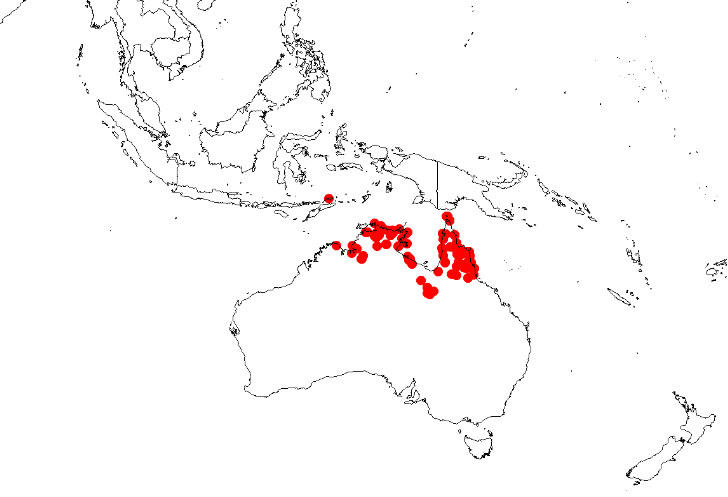
- Occurrence data from AVH

Synonyms
- Amylotheca brittenii (Blakely) Danser; Loranthus brittenii Blakely; Loranthus signatus var. angustatus Domin

Species of epiphyte

Decaisnina brittenii is a species of flowering plant, an epiphytic hemiparasitic plant of the family Loranthaceae native to the Northern Territory, Queensland and northern Western Australia.

D. brittenii has linear to narrowly lanceolate leaves and this is the only way in which it differs from D. signata. It is typically found on Melaleuca & Barringtonia.

== Taxonomy ==
Decaisnina brittenii was first described in 1922 as Loranthus brittenii by William Blakely, despite a specimen, NSW 79295, having been collected by Joseph Banks at Endeavour River in 1770 during Cook's first voyage, and subsequently drawn for Joseph Banks by Daniel Solander. In 1966, Bryan Alwyn Barlow reassigned it to the genus, Decaisnina.

== Etymology ==
The generic name, Decaisnina honours the French botanist, Joseph Decaisne (1807–1882), and the specific epithet, brittenii, honours the British botanist, James Britten (1846–1924),
