= Ujir =

Ujir may be,

- Ujir language, language spoken in Aru Islands in eastern Indonesia

== People ==
- Masai Ujiri, English-born Nigerian basketball executive and former basketball player
- Ujir Singh Thapa, Nepalese administrator and military officer

== See also ==
- Ujire, town in Karnataka, India
