= Goodenia goodeniacea =

Scientific classification
- Kingdom: Plantae
- Clade: Tracheophytes
- Clade: Angiosperms
- Clade: Eudicots
- Clade: Asterids
- Order: Asterales
- Family: Goodeniaceae
- Genus: Goodenia
- Species: G. goodeniacea

Binomial name
- Goodenia goodeniacea (F.Muell.) Carolin

Synonyms
- Catosperma goodeniacea Krause orth. var.; Catosperma goodeniaceum Baill. orth. var.; Catosperma muelleri Benth. orth. var.; Catospermum goodeniaceum (F.Muell.) Baill.; Catospermum muelleri Benth. nom. illeg., nom. superfl.; Scaevola goodeniacea F.Muell.

Species of plant

Goodenia goodeniacea is a species of flowering plant in the family Goodeniaceae and is endemic to northern, inland Australia. It a prostrate herb with toothed, elliptic to egg-shaped leaves at the base of the plant, and thyrses of yellow flowers with purplish lines.

== Description ==
Goodenia goodeniacea is a prostrate herb with stems up to 50 cm (20 in) long. The leaves at the base of the plant are elliptic to egg-shaped, 50–60 mm (2.0–2.4 in) long and 30–40 mm (1.2–1.6 in) wide with toothed edges. The leaves on the stem are similar but smaller. The flowers are arranged in thyrses up to 400 mm (16 in) long on peduncles 5–15 mm (0.20–0.59 in) long with leaf-like bracts at the base. The individual flowers are on pedicels 10–20 mm (0.39–0.79 in) long with linear bracteoles up to 2 mm (0.079 in) long. The sepals are linear, about 3 mm (0.12 in) long, the corolla yellow with purplish lines, 13–15 mm (0.51–0.59 in) long. The lower lobes are 5–7 mm (0.20–0.28 in) long with wings about 1.5 mm (0.059 in) wide. Flowering occurs from May to August and the fruit is a more or less spherical capsule about 10 mm (0.39 in) in diameter.

== Taxonomy and naming ==
This species was first formally described in 1859 by Ferdinand von Mueller who gave it the name Scaevola goodeniacea in Fragmenta Phytographiae Australiae. In 1990 Roger Charles Carolin changed the name to Goodenia goodeniacea in the journal Telopea.

== Distribution and habitat ==
This goodenia grows on plains and sand dunes in scattered populations between Tennant Creek and Sturt Creek in the Northern Territory, and in Queensland.

== Conservation status ==
Goodenia goodeniacea is classified as of "least concern" under the Queensland Government Nature Conservation Act 1992 and the Northern Territory Government Territory Parks and Wildlife Conservation Act 1976.
