= 10th parallel =

10th parallel may refer to:

- 10th parallel north, a circle of latitude in the Northern Hemisphere
- 10th parallel south, a circle of latitude in the Southern Hemisphere
