= 9th parallel =

9th parallel may refer to:

- 9th parallel north, a circle of latitude in the Northern Hemisphere
- 9th parallel south, a circle of latitude in the Southern Hemisphere
