= Decaisnina hollrungii =

Scientific classification
- Kingdom: Plantae
- Clade: Embryophytes
- Clade: Tracheophytes
- Clade: Spermatophytes
- Clade: Angiosperms
- Clade: Eudicots
- Order: Santalales
- Family: Loranthaceae
- Genus: Decaisnina
- Species: D. hollrungii

Binomial name
- Decaisnina hollrungii (K.Schum.) Barlow
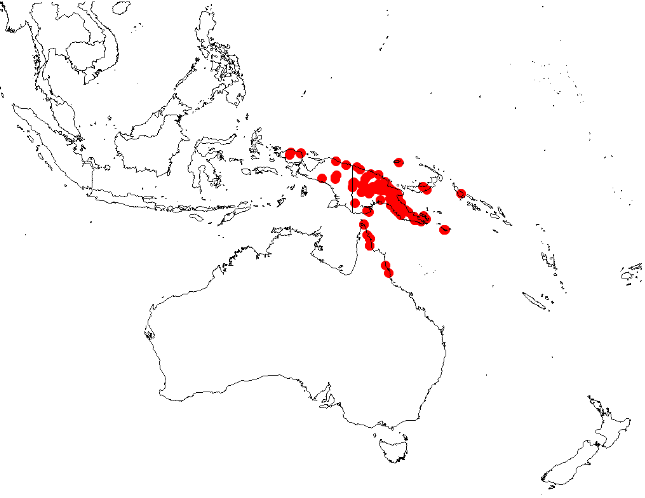
- Occurrence data from AVH

Synonyms
- Loranthus hollrungii K.Schum. Amylotheca hollrungii (K.Schum.) Tiegh.

Species of epiphyte

Decaisnina hollrungii is a species of flowering plant, an epiphytic hemiparasitic plant of the family Loranthaceae native to New Guinea, Queensland, Australia, and in the Bismarck Archipelago and the Solomon Islands.

In Queensland, D. hollrungii is found in rainforest and in dense coastal scrub on a wide range of hosts.

== Taxonomy ==
Decaisnina hollrungii was first described in 1889 as Loranthus hollrungii by Karl Moritz Schumann. In 1894, Philippe Édouard Léon Van Tieghem assigned it to his new genus, Amylotheca. In 1966, Bryan Alwyn Barlow reassigned it to the genus, Decaisnina.

== Etymology ==
The generic name, Decaisnina honours the French botanist Joseph Decaisne (1807–1882), and the specific epithet, hollrungii, honours the botanist Udo Max Hollrung (1858-1937).
