= 8th parallel =

8th parallel may refer to:

- 8th parallel north, a circle of latitude in the Northern Hemisphere
- 8th parallel south, a circle of latitude in the Southern Hemisphere
