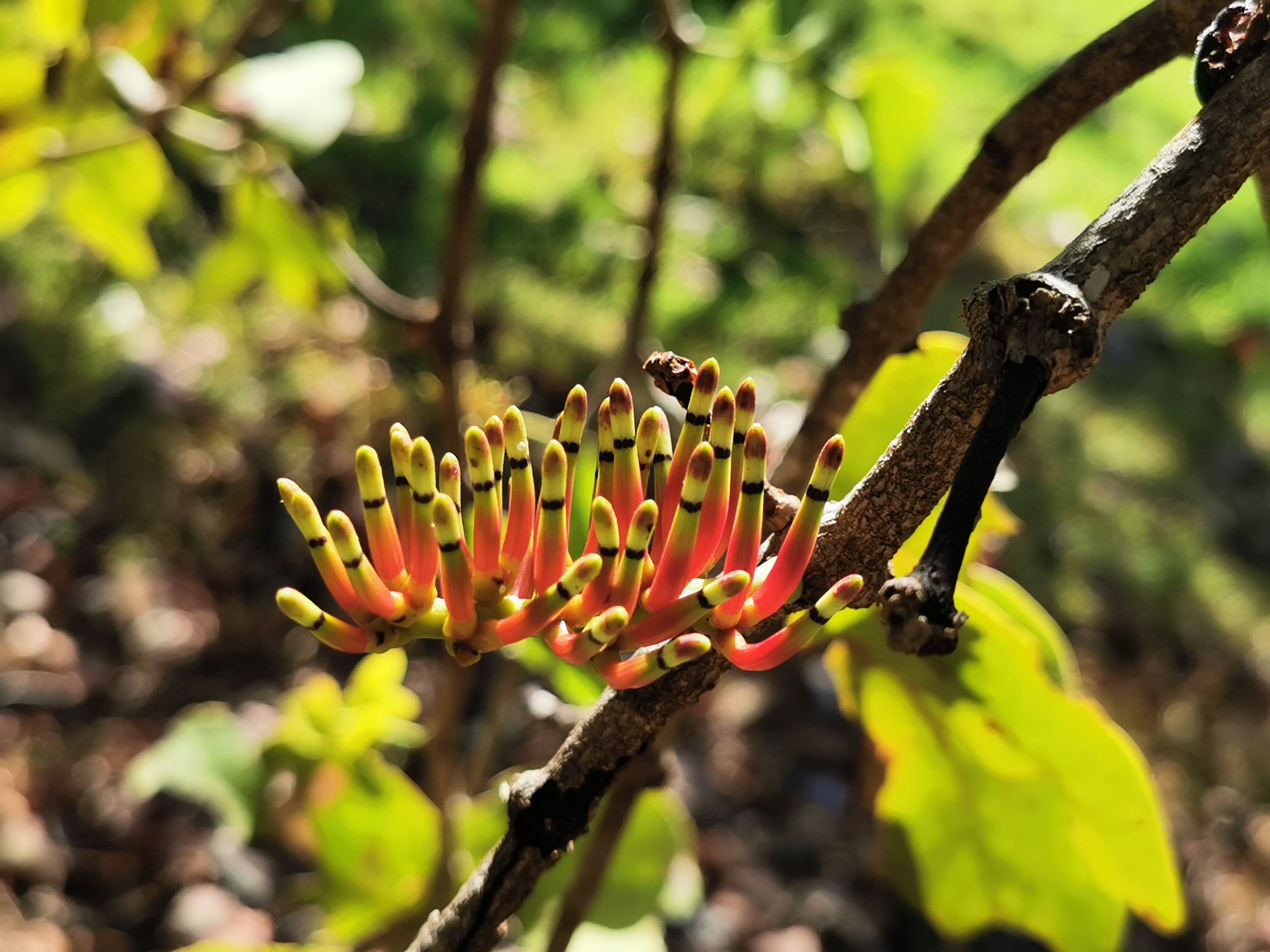
- Decaisnina signata

Scientific classification
- Kingdom: Plantae
- Clade: Tracheophytes
- Clade: Angiosperms
- Clade: Eudicots
- Order: Santalales
- Family: Loranthaceae
- Genus: Decaisnina; Tiegh.

Species
- See text
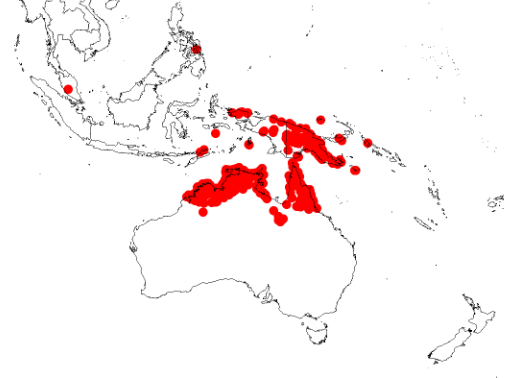
- Occurrence data from AVH

= Decaisnina =

Genus of mistletoes

Decaisnina is a genus of semi-parasitic shrubs (mistletoes) that occur in Australia. The type species is D. glauca. Around thirty species are known, found from northern Australia to Tahiti and the Philippines.

== Accepted species ==
(according to Plants of the world online)

1. Decaisnina aherniana (Merr.) Barlow
2. Decaisnina amplexicaulis (Danser) Barlow
3. Decaisnina angustata (Barlow) Barlow
4. Decaisnina biangulata (W.Fitzg.) Barlow
5. Decaisnina brittenii (Blakeley) Barlow
6. Decaisnina celebica (Hemsl.) Barlow
7. Decaisnina confertiflora (Merr.) Barlow
8. Decaisnina congesta Barlow
9. Decaisnina crassilimba (Merr.) Barlow
10. Decaisnina cumingii (Tiegh.) Barlow
11. Decaisnina djamuensis (Krause) Barlow
12. Decaisnina forsteriana (Schult. & Schult.f.) Barlow
13. Decaisnina hollrungii (K.Schum.) Barlow
14. Decaisnina longipes Barlow
15. Decaisnina micranthes (Danser) Barlow
16. Decaisnina miniata (Danser) Barlow
17. Decaisnina ovatifolia (Merr.) Barlow
18. Decaisnina pedicellata (Danser) Barlow
19. Decaisnina revoluta (Merr.) Barlow
20. Decaisnina signata (F.Muell. ex Benth.) Tiegh.
21. Decaisnina stenopetala (Oliv.) Barlow
22. Decaisnina sumbawensis (Tiegh.) Barlow
23. Decaisnina triflora (Span.) Tiegh.
24. Decaisnina viridis (Merr.) Barlow
25. Decaisnina zollingeri (Tiegh.) Barlow
