= 6th parallel =

6th parallel may refer to:

- 6th parallel north, a circle of latitude in the Northern Hemisphere
- 6th parallel south, a circle of latitude in the Southern Hemisphere
