= Lorang =

Lorang may be,

- Lorang language
- Lorang Christiansen
