= Johann Wilhelm Krause =

Johann Wilhelm Krause may refer to:

- Johann Wilhelm Krause (architect) (1757–1828), Baltic-German architect
- Johann Wilhelm Krause (botanist) (1764–1842), German botanist
