= KVO =

KVO may refer to:

- Kiev Military District, a military district of Imperial Russia and the Soviet Union
- Dobel language, spoken by inhabitants of the Aru Islands
- Commander of the Order of Vasa (Swedish: Kommendör av Vasaorden)
- "Keep vein open", a medical acronym for an intravenous drip that is flowing just enough to keep the IV open for future use (sometimes written as TKO - "to keep open")
- IATA airport designation for Morava Airport in Kraljevo, Serbia.
- ¨KV Oostende a football team from Ostend (Oostende), Belgium.
