= 7th parallel =

7th parallel may refer to:

- 7th parallel north, a circle of latitude in the Northern Hemisphere
- 7th parallel south, a circle of latitude in the Southern Hemisphere
