= Koba language =

Austronesian language spoken in Maluku, Indonesia

Koba
- Region: Aru Islands
- Native speakers: 870 (2011)
- Language family: Austronesian: Malayo-Polynesian; Central–Eastern; Aru; Koba

Language codes
- ISO 639-3: kpd
- Glottolog: koba1240

Koba is a language spoken on the Aru Islands of eastern Indonesia. It is close to Dobel, though mutual comprehension is low.
