= Karey language =

Austronesian language spoken in Maluku, Indonesia

Karey
- Native to: Indonesia
- Region: Aru Islands
- Native speakers: 610 (2011)
- Language family: Austronesian: Malayo-Polynesian; Central–Eastern; Aru; Karey

Language codes
- ISO 639-3: kyd
- Glottolog: kare1339

Karey (Krei) is an Austronesian language spoken on the Aru Islands of eastern Indonesia.
