= Barakai language =

Austronesian language in Indonesia

Barakai
- Native to: Indonesia
- Region: Aru Islands
- Native speakers: 4,500 (2011)
- Language family: Austronesian: Malayo-Polynesian; Central–Eastern; Aru; Barakai

Language codes
- ISO 639-3: baj
- Glottolog: bara1367

Barakai is one of the Aru languages, spoken by inhabitants of the Aru Islands.
