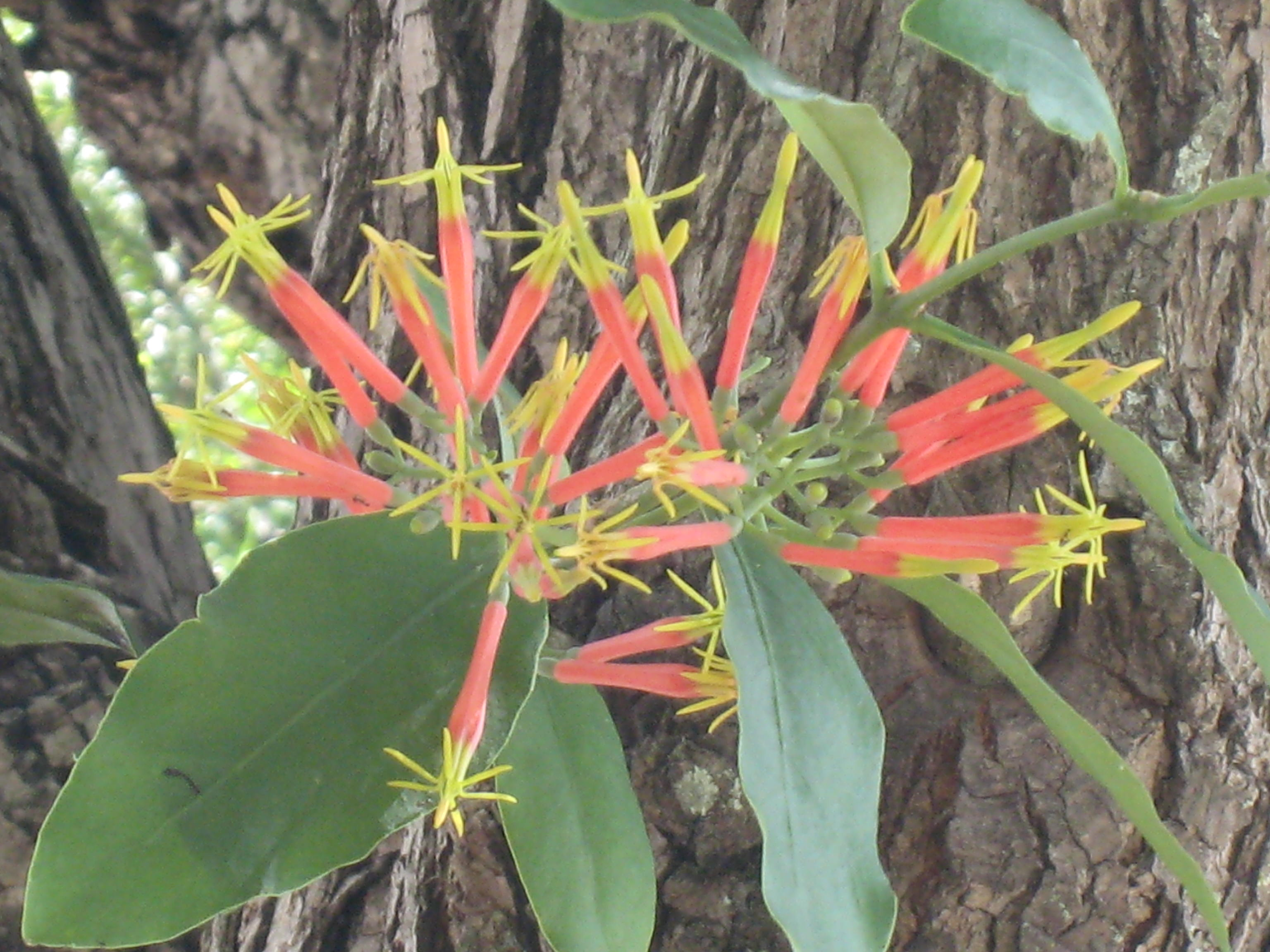

Scientific classification
- Kingdom: Plantae
- Clade: Tracheophytes
- Clade: Angiosperms
- Clade: Eudicots
- Order: Santalales
- Family: Loranthaceae
- Genus: Amylotheca
- Species: A. dictyophleba

Binomial name
- Amylotheca dictyophleba (F.Muell.) Tiegh.

Synonyms
- Loranthus dictyophlebus F.Muell.

= Amylotheca dictyophleba =

Species of flowering plant

Amylotheca dictyophleba is a member of the mistletoe family, Loranthaceae, and was first described in 1860 by Ferdinand von Mueller as Loranthus dictyophlebus, but in 1894, Philippe Édouard Léon Van Tieghem transferred it to his newly described genus, Amylotheca.

It is native to Australia where it is found in New South Wales and Queensland. It is native also to the Pacific Islands of New Caledonia, New Guinea, and Vanuatu.
