= Mariri language =

Austronesian language spoken in Maluku, Indonesia

Mariri
- Native to: Indonesia
- Region: Aru Islands
- Native speakers: 280 (2011)
- Language family: Austronesian: Malayo-Polynesian; Central–Eastern; Aru; Mariri

Language codes
- ISO 639-3: mqi
- Glottolog: mari1430

Mariri (Mairiri) is an Austronesian language spoken on the Aru Islands of eastern Indonesia. It is close to Batuley.
