= Kola Island =

Island in Maluku, Indonesia

Kola
- Location within Maluku

Geography
- Location: Oceania
- Coordinates: 5°30′S 134°35′E
- Archipelago: Aru Islands

Administration
- Indonesia
- Province: Maluku
- Regency: Aru Islands Regency

Additional information
- Time zone: IEST (UTC+09:00)

Kola is an island in the Aru Islands in the Arafura Sea. It is situated in the Maluku Province, Indonesia. The other five main islands in the archipelago are Tanahbesar (also called Wokam), Kobroor, Maikoor, Koba, and Trangan.

The Kola language is spoken on the island.
