= Tarangan language =

Austronesian language spoken in Indonesia

Tarangan
- Rau Jarjar
- Native to: Indonesia
- Region: Aru Islands
- Native speakers: 14,000 (2011)
- Language family: Austronesian: Malayo-Polynesian; Central–Eastern; Aru; Tarangan

Language codes
- ISO 639-3: Either: tre – East Tarangan txn – West Tarangan
- Glottolog: east2465 East west2538 West

Tarangan is one of the Aru languages, spoken by inhabitants of the Aru Islands in eastern Indonesia. There are two varieties of Tarangan: East and West Tarangan. These varieties are divergent, perhaps no closer than they are to Manombai, also spoken in the Arus. West Tarangan is a trade language of the southern islands.

== Phonology ==
The following is the description for West Tarangan:

=== Consonants ===
Consonant phonemes
		Labial	Dental/ Alveolar	Palatal	Velar	Glottal
Nasal		m	n		ŋ	
Plosive	voiceless	(p)	t̪		k	(ʔ)
Plosive	voiced	b	d	(dʒ)	(ɡ)	
Fricative		ɸ	s			
Flap			ɾ			
Lateral			l			
Approximant				j	w	

- /k/ can occur as a glottal [ʔ] intervocalically between two non-high vowels.
- /ɸ/ is heard as a stop [p] syllable-final position.
- /w j/ are heard as voiced stops [ɡ dʒ] in word-initial position and within a stressed noninitial syllable onset.

=== Vowels ===
Vowel phonemes
	Front	Central	Back
Close	i		u
Close-mid	e		o
Open-mid	ɛ		ɔ
Open		a	

- /a i/ in unstressed positions are heard as [ə ɪ].
- Sounds /e o/ are phonetically [e̝ o̝].
