= Lola language =

Austronesian language spoken in Maluku, Indonesia

Lola
- Region: Aru Islands, Indonesia
- Native speakers: 900 (2011)
- Language family: Austronesian: Malayo-Polynesian; Central–Eastern; Aru; Lola
- Dialects: Warabal

Language codes
- ISO 639-3: lcd
- Glottolog: lola1248
- ELP: Lola

Lola is an Austronesian language spoken on the Aru Islands of eastern Indonesia.
