= Maikoor =

Island in Maluku, Indonesia

- Location within Maluku

Geography
- Location: Oceania
- Coordinates: 6°10′S 134°12′E
- Archipelago: Aru Islands

Administration
- Indonesia
- Province: Maluku
- Regency: Aru Islands Regency

Additional information
- Time zone: IEST (UTC+09:00)

Maikoor is an island in the Aru Islands in the Arafura Sea. It is situated in the Maluku Province, Indonesia. Its area is 398 km^{2}. The other main islands in the archipelago are Tanahbesar (also called Wokam), Kola, Kobroor, Koba, and Trangan. The 934th Naval Air Group of the occupying Japanese Navy briefly operated a seaplane base from the island during World War II. Established in April 1943, the Japanese began withdrawing in December 1943 as the base was now within reach of fighter escorts and floatplanes were no longer of any utility in the area.
