= Syzygium eucalyptoides =

- Syzygium eucalyptoides ssp. bleeseri

Conservation status
- Data Deficient (IUCN 3.1)

Scientific classification
- Kingdom: Plantae
- Clade: Tracheophytes
- Clade: Angiosperms
- Clade: Eudicots
- Clade: Rosids
- Order: Myrtales
- Family: Myrtaceae
- Genus: Syzygium
- Species: S. eucalyptoides

Binomial name
- Syzygium eucalyptoides (F.Muell.) B.Hyland

Synonyms
- Eugenia eucalyptoides (F.Muell.) F.Muell.; Jambosa eucalyptoides F.Muell.

Species of tree

Syzygium eucalyptoides, commonly known as native apple, is a species of flowering plant in the family Myrtaceae. It is a tree native to Western Australia, Queensland, and the Northern Territory in northern Australia. It bears fruit in the wet season.

== Description ==
S. eucalyptoides is a small tree. It has glossy leaves and scented flowers. It bears pinkish-white fruit, which is edible. This fruit has calyx lobes that are at least a millimeter long and is at least 30 millimeters in diameter.

The subspecies can be distinguished based on the leaves. If the leaf blade is more than six times as long as it is broad, then the tree is of the subspecies eucalyptoides; otherwise, it is of the subspecies bleeseri.

Fruit of Syzygium eucalyptoides ssp. bleeseri

Leaves of Syzygium eucalyptoides ssp. bleeseri

Trunk of Syzygium eucalyptoides ssp. bleeseri
