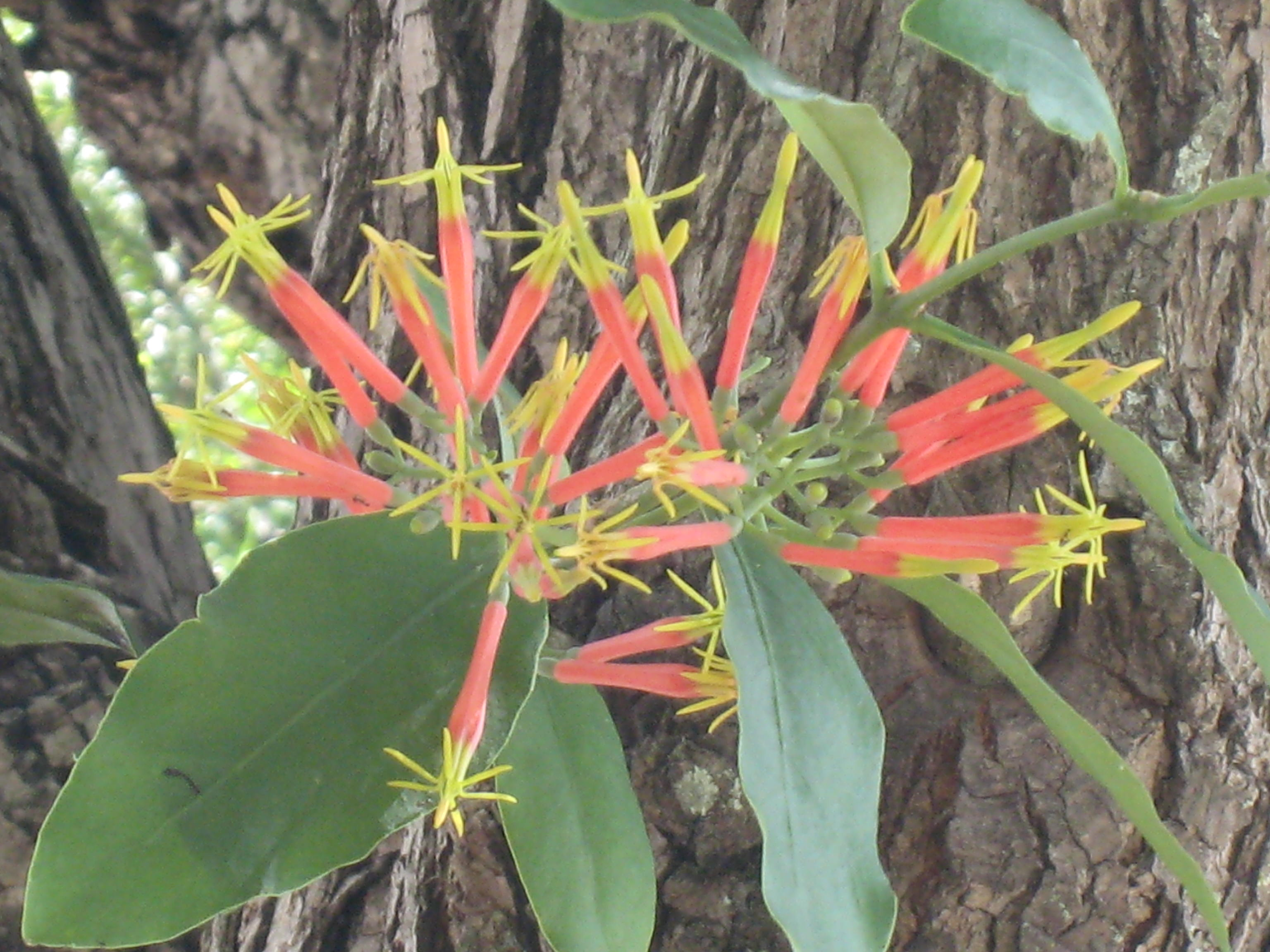
- Amylotheca dictyophleba on camphor laurel, Kedron, QLD
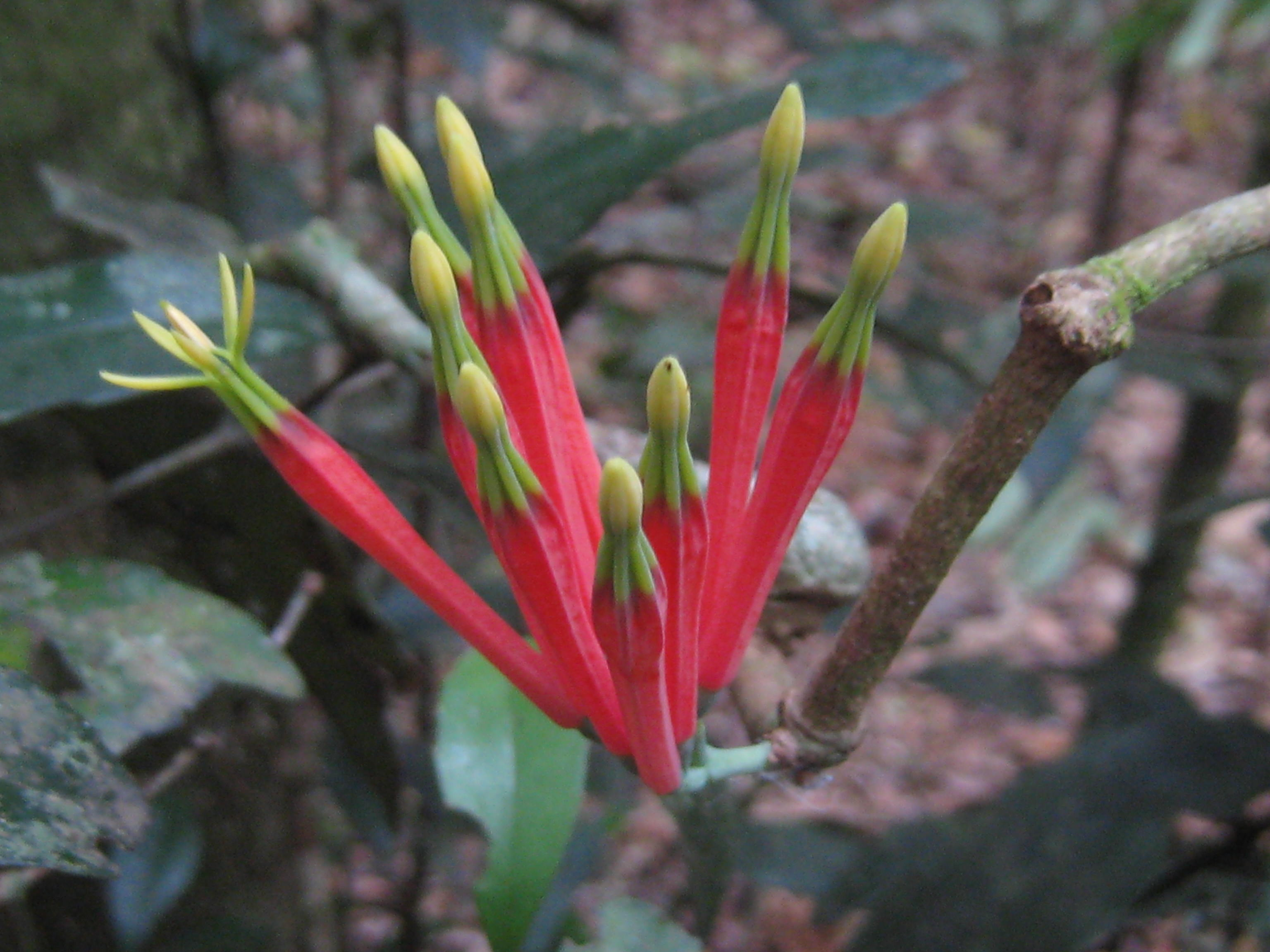
- Amylotheca dictyophleba, Lamington National Park, QLD

Scientific classification
- Kingdom: Plantae
- Clade: Tracheophytes
- Clade: Angiosperms
- Clade: Eudicots
- Order: Santalales
- Family: Loranthaceae
- Genus: Amylotheca; Tiegh.
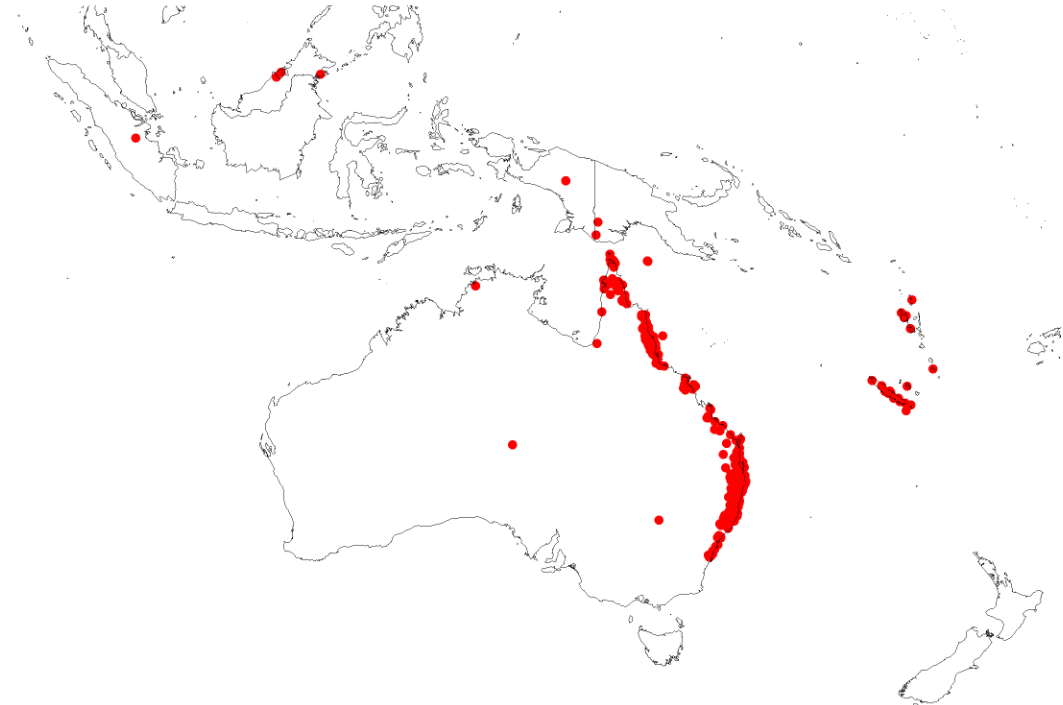
- Occurrence data from AVH

= Amylotheca =

Genus of mistletoes

Amylotheca is a genus of hemi-parasitic aerial shrubs in the family Loranthaceae, found in Borneo, Malaysia, New Caledonia, New Guinea, Australia (in New South Wales and Queensland), Sumatra, Thailand, Vanuatu, and Philippines

== Description ==
The genus Amylotheca is distinguished from other Australian Loranthaceae genera by having

- Petals which are united to the middle or higher
- Six petals
- A straight corolla tube
- epicortical runners
- inflorescences usually a raceme of triads on a single raceme.

== Species ==
=== Accepted species according to Plants of the world online ===
- Amylotheca acuminatifolia Barlow
- Amylotheca dictyophleba (F.Muell.) Tiegh.
- Amylotheca duthieana (King) Danser
- Amylotheca subumbellata Barlow

=== Recent Publication ===
- Amylotheca cleofei Tandang, Galindon & A.S.Rob.

== Ecology ==
An inventory of host plants for Amylotheca spp. is given by Downey

== Taxonomy ==
Amylotheca is a member of the family Loranthaceae within the mistletoe order, Santalales. The name Amylotheca was first published by Philippe Édouard Léon Van Tieghem in 1895,

== Etymology ==
The genus name, Amylotheca, derives from the Latin, amylum (starch), and theca (case), and refers to the starch cells in the locules of the ovary.
