= Kola language =

Austronesian language in Maluku

Kola
- Native to: Indonesia
- Region: Aru Islands
- Native speakers: (7,700 cited 1995–2011)
- Language family: Austronesian: Malayo-Polynesian; Central–Eastern; Aru; Kola

Language codes
- ISO 639-3: Either: kvv – Kola kvp – Kompane
- Glottolog: kola1292

Kola is one of the Aru languages, spoken in the northernmost part of the Aru Islands, mainly on Kola Island and in the northern and western part of Wokam Island.
