= Kobroor =

Island in Maluku, Indonesia

- Location within Maluku

Geography
- Location: Oceania
- Coordinates: 6°7′S 134°36′E
- Archipelago: Aru Islands

Administration
- Indonesia
- Province: Maluku
- Regency: Aru Islands Regency

Additional information
- Time zone: IEST (UTC+09:00)

Kobroor is an island in the Aru Islands in the Arafura Sea. It is situated in the Maluku Province, Indonesia. Its area is 1723 km^{2}. The other main islands in the archipelago are Tanahbesar (also called Wokam), Kola, Maikoor, Koba and Trangan.
