= Circles of latitude between the 5th parallel south and the 10th parallel south =

Circles of latitude

Following are circles of latitude between the 5th parallel south and the 10th parallel south:

== 6th parallel south ==
6th parallel south (interactive map)

The 6th parallel south is a circle of latitude that is 6 degrees south of the Earth's equatorial plane. It crosses the Atlantic Ocean, Africa, the Indian Ocean, Southeast Asia, Australasia, the Pacific Ocean and South America.

=== Around the world ===
Starting at the Prime Meridian and heading eastwards, the parallel 6° south passes through:

Coordinates	Country, territory or sea	Notes
6°0′S 0°0′E	Atlantic Ocean	
6°0′S 12°24′E	Democratic Republic of the Congo	
6°0′S 12°43′E	Angola	
6°0′S 16°36′E	Democratic Republic of the Congo	
6°0′S 29°11′E	Lake Tanganyika	
6°0′S 29°46′E	Tanzania	
6°0′S 38°47′E	Indian Ocean	Zanzibar Channel
6°0′S 39°11′E	Tanzania	Island of Zanzibar
6°0′S 39°23′E	Indian Ocean	Passing through the Amirante Islands, Seychelles; Passing just south of Île Platte, Seychelles; Passing just north of the Eagle Islands and Three Brothers, British Indian Ocean Territory; Passing just south of the island of Sumatra, Indonesia
6°0′S 106°2′E	Indonesia	Passing just north of Cilegon City, Indonesia
6°0′S 106°51′E	Jakarta Bay	
6°0′S 107°3′E	Indonesia	Passing north of Bekasi Regency, Indonesia
6°0′S 107°22′E	Java Sea	Passing just south of the island of Karimun Jawa, Indonesia; Passing just south of the island of Bawean, Indonesia
6°0′S 120°27′E	Indonesia	Island of Selayar
6°0′S 120°33′E	Banda Sea	
6°0′S 124°3′E	Indonesia	Island of Binongko
6°0′S 124°4′E	Banda Sea	
6°0′S 132°27′E	Indonesia	Island of Tanimbar Kei
6°0′S 132°28′E	Arafura Sea	Passing just south of the islands of Kai Kecil and Kai Besar, Indonesia; Passing just north of the island of Maikoor, Indonesia
6°0′S 134°18′E	Indonesia	Islands of Tanahbesar and Kobroor
6°0′S 134°42′E	Arafura Sea	
6°0′S 138°19′E	Indonesia	Island of New Guinea
6°0′S 141°0′E	Papua New Guinea	Island of New Guinea
6°0′S 147°30′E	Solomon Sea	
6°0′S 148°54′E	Papua New Guinea	Island of New Britain
6°0′S 151°3′E	Solomon Sea	
6°0′S 154°48′E	Papua New Guinea	Bougainville Island
6°0′S 155°24′E	Pacific Ocean	Passing between Roncador Reef and Ontong Java Atoll, Solomon Islands; Passing between Nanumea atoll and Nanumanga island, Tuvalu; Passing just north of Niutao island, Tuvalu; Passing just south of Starbuck Island, Kiribati
6°0′S 81°8′W	Peru	Passing just north of Moyobamba
6°0′S 73°8′W	Brazil	Amazonas; Pará; Tocantins; Maranhão; Piauí; Ceará; Rio Grande do Norte - passing just south of Natal
6°0′S 35°7′W	Atlantic Ocean	

== 7th parallel south ==
7th parallel south (interactive map)

The 7th parallel south is a circle of latitude that is 7 degrees south of the Earth's equatorial plane. It crosses the Atlantic Ocean, Africa, the Indian Ocean, Southeast Asia, Australasia, the Pacific Ocean and South America.

Part of the border between the Democratic Republic of the Congo and Angola is defined by the parallel.

It is the most populous parallel south of the Equator, being home to between 86.1 million and 99.8 million people as of 2019.

=== Around the world ===
Starting at the Prime Meridian and heading eastwards, the parallel 7° south passes through:

Coordinates	Country, territory or sea	Notes
7°0′S 0°0′E	Atlantic Ocean	
7°0′S 12°50′E	Angola	
7°0′S 16°58′E	Democratic Republic of the Congo	
7°0′S 19°32′E	Democratic Republic of the Congo / Angola border	
7°0′S 20°18′E	Angola	
7°0′S 20°34′E	Democratic Republic of the Congo	
7°0′S 29°44′E	Lake Tanganyika	
7°0′S 30°34′E	Tanzania	Passing just south of Dar es Salaam
7°0′S 39°33′E	Indian Ocean	
7°0′S 52°44′E	Seychelles	Alphonse Atoll
7°0′S 52°46′E	Indian Ocean	Passing just north of Coëtivy Island, Seychelles
7°0′S 106°33′E	Indonesia	Island of Java
7°0′S 112°35′E	Java Sea	
7°0′S 112°46′E	Indonesia	Island of Madura
7°0′S 114°4′E	Java Sea	
7°0′S 115°16′E	Indonesia	Islands of Kangean and Paliat
7°0′S 115°40′E	Java Sea	Passing just north of the island of Tanahjampea
7°0′S 120°37′E	Banda Sea	Passing just north of the island of Damar, Indonesia; Passing between the islands of Itain and Maru, Indonesia
7°0′S 131°58′E	Indonesia	Island of Fordate
7°0′S 131°59′E	Arafura Sea	Passing just south of the island of Trangan, Indonesia
7°0′S 138°37′E	Indonesia	Island of New Guinea
7°0′S 141°1′E	Papua New Guinea	Island of New Guinea
7°0′S 146°59′E	Pacific Ocean	Solomon Sea
7°0′S 155°42′E	Solomon Islands	Shortland Island
7°0′S 155°46′E	Pacific Ocean	Passing just south of Fauro Island, Solomon Islands
7°0′S 156°43′E	Solomon Islands	Choiseul Island
7°0′S 157°6′E	Pacific Ocean	Passing between the atolls of Nanumea and Nanumanga, Tuvalu; Passing just north of Niutao island, Tuvalu; Passing south of Starbuck Island, Kiribati
7°0′S 79°47′W	Peru	
7°0′S 73°46′W	Brazil	Amazonas; Pará; Tocantins; Maranhão; Piauí; Ceará; Paraíba - passing 6.5 km north of João Pessoa at the mouth of the Paraíba River
7°0′S 34°49′W	Atlantic Ocean	

== 8th parallel south ==
8th parallel south (interactive map)

The 8th parallel south is a circle of latitude that is 8 degrees south of the Earth's equatorial plane. It crosses the Atlantic Ocean, Africa, the Indian Ocean, Southeast Asia, Australasia, the Pacific Ocean and South America.

Two sections of the border between the Democratic Republic of the Congo and Angola are defined by the parallel.

It passes through 10 out of the 26 states of Brazil.

=== Around the world ===
Starting at the Prime Meridian and heading eastwards, the parallel 8° south passes through:

Coordinates	Country, territory or sea	Notes
8°0′S 0°0′E	Atlantic Ocean	
8°0′S 13°11′E	Angola	
8°0′S 17°29′E	Democratic Republic of the Congo	
8°0′S 18°10′E	Angola	
8°0′S 18°18′E	Democratic Republic of the Congo	
8°0′S 18°23′E	Democratic Republic of Congo / Angola border	
8°0′S 18°31′E	Angola	
8°0′S 18°48′E	Democratic Republic of Congo / Angola border	
8°0′S 19°22′E	Angola	
8°0′S 21°46′E	Democratic Republic of the Congo	
8°0′S 30°27′E	Lake Tanganyika	
8°0′S 30°53′E	Tanzania	
8°0′S 39°27′E	Indian Ocean	Passing just south of the island of Mafia, Tanzania
8°0′S 39°45′E	Tanzania	Island of Chole
8°0′S 39°48′E	Indian Ocean	
8°0′S 110°15′E	Indonesia	Island of Java
8°0′S 114°25′E	Bali Sea	Passing just north of the island of Bali, Indonesia
8°0′S 117°9′E	Flores Sea	Passing just north of the island of Sumbawa, Indonesia
8°0′S 122°47′E	Banda Sea	Passing just north of the island of Flores, Indonesia; Passing just north of the island of Alor, Indonesia
8°0′S 125°43′E	Indonesia	Islands of Liran and Wetar
8°0′S 125°48′E	Wetar Strait	Passing just north of the island of Kisar, Indonesia
8°0′S 129°39′E	Indonesia	Island of Babar
8°0′S 129°48′E	Timor Sea	
8°0′S 131°12′E	Indonesia	Island of Yamdena
8°0′S 131°19′E	Arafura Sea	
8°0′S 137°50′E	Indonesia	Islands of Yos Sudarso and New Guinea
8°0′S 141°1′E	Papua New Guinea	Island of New Guinea
8°0′S 143°55′E	Gulf of Papua	
8°0′S 145°48′E	Papua New Guinea	Island of New Guinea
8°0′S 147°57′E	Solomon Sea	
8°0′S 156°31′E	Solomon Islands	Island of Ranongga
8°0′S 156°35′E	Solomon Sea	
8°0′S 156°56′E	Solomon Islands	Island of Kolombangara
8°0′S 157°11′E	Kula Gulf	
8°0′S 157°23′E	Solomon Islands	Island of New Georgia
8°0′S 157°33′E	New Georgia Sound	
8°0′S 158°53′E	Solomon Islands	Santa Isabel Island
8°0′S 159°24′E	Pacific Ocean	Passing just south of the island of Dai, Solomon Islands
8°0′S 178°20′E	Tuvalu	Nukufetau atoll
8°0′S 178°24′E	Pacific Ocean	The parallel defines the northern maritime boundary of the Cook Islands from the 167th meridian west to the 156th meridian west
8°0′S 140°43′W	French Polynesia	Island of Eiao
8°0′S 140°40′W	Pacific Ocean	
8°0′S 79°13′W	Peru	
8°0′S 73°40′W	Brazil	Acre; Amazonas; Rondônia; Amazonas; Mato Grosso; Pará; Tocantins; Maranhão - for about 11 km Piauí; Pernambuco; Paraíba; Pernambuco - passing just north of Recife
8°0′S 34°50′W	Atlantic Ocean	Passing just to the south of Ascension Island,

== 9th parallel south ==
9th parallel south (interactive map)

The 9th parallel south is a circle of latitude that is 9 degrees south of the Earth's equatorial plane. It crosses the Atlantic Ocean, Africa, the Indian Ocean, Australasia, the Pacific Ocean and South America.

The parallel passes through 11 out of the 26 states of Brazil.

=== Around the world ===
Starting at the Prime Meridian and heading eastwards, the parallel 9° south passes through:

Coordinates	Country, territory or sea	Notes
9°0′S 0°0′E	Atlantic Ocean	
9°0′S 13°1′E	Angola	
9°0′S 21°51′E	Democratic Republic of the Congo	
9°0′S 28°27′E	Lake Mweru	
9°0′S 29°1′E	Zambia	
9°0′S 31°56′E	Tanzania	Mainland and island of Kilwa Kisiwani
9°0′S 39°32′E	Indian Ocean	Passing just north of Providence Atoll, Seychelles; Passing just south of the islands of Java, Bali, Nusa Penida and Lombok, Indonesia
9°0′S 116°44′E	Indonesia	Island of Sumbawa
9°0′S 117°32′E	Indian Ocean	Sumba Strait; Savu Sea - passing just south of the island of Flores, Indonesia
9°0′S 124°48′E	Indonesia	Island of Timor - for about 16 km
9°0′S 124°56′E	Timor-Leste	Island of Timor - for about 14 km
9°0′S 125°5′E	Indonesia	Island of Timor - for about 6 km
9°0′S 125°8′E	Timor-Leste	Island of Timor
9°0′S 126°8′E	Timor Sea	
9°0′S 130°59′E	Arafura Sea	
9°0′S 140°50′E	Indonesia	Island of New Guinea
9°0′S 141°1′E	Papua New Guinea	Islands of New Guinea and Parama
9°0′S 143°27′E	Coral Sea	Gulf of Papua
9°0′S 146°36′E	Papua New Guinea	Island of New Guinea
9°0′S 148°31′E	Solomon Sea	Oro Bay
9°0′S 149°7′E	Papua New Guinea	Island of New Guinea
9°0′S 149°8′E	Solomon Sea	Passing between the D'Entrecasteaux and Trobriand Islands, Papua New Guinea
9°0′S 152°23′E	Papua New Guinea	Islands of Nusam and Woodlark
9°0′S 152°39′E	Solomon Sea	Passing just south of the islands of Tetepare, Vangunu and Nggatokae, Solomon Islands
9°0′S 159°2′E	Solomon Islands	Russell Islands
9°0′S 159°16′E	New Georgia Sound	Passing just north of Savo Island, Solomon Islands
9°0′S 160°3′E	Solomon Islands	Florida Islands
9°0′S 160°13′E	Indispensable Strait	
9°0′S 160°46′E	Solomon Islands	Island of Malaita
9°0′S 161°8′E	Pacific Ocean	Passing between the Funafuti and Nukulaelae atolls, Tuvalu; Passing just north of Nukunonu atoll, Tokelau
9°0′S 158°3′W	Cook Islands	Penrhyn Island
9°0′S 157°56′W	Pacific Ocean	Passing just south of Nuku Hiva and Ua Huka islands, French Polynesia
9°0′S 78°40′W	Peru	
9°0′S 72°57′W	Brazil	Acre; Amazonas; Rondônia - for about 8 km Amazonas - for about 20 km Rondônia; Mato Grosso; Pará; Tocantins; Maranhão; Piauí; Bahia; Pernambuco - passing just north of the city of Petrolina and the city of the Juazeiro, Bahia; Bahia - passing through the São Francisco River; Pernambuco - for about 13 km Bahia - for about 5 km Pernambuco; Alagoas - for about 20 km Pernambuco - for about 8 km Alagoas - for about 15 km Pernambuco; Alagoas - passing just north of the city of Maceió
9°0′S 35°12′W	Atlantic Ocean	

== 10th parallel south ==
10th parallel south (interactive map)

The 10th parallel south is a circle of latitude that is 10 degrees south of the Earth's equatorial plane. It crosses the Atlantic Ocean, Africa, the Indian Ocean, Australasia, the Pacific Ocean and South America.

Part of the border between Brazil and Peru is defined by the parallel.

=== Around the world ===
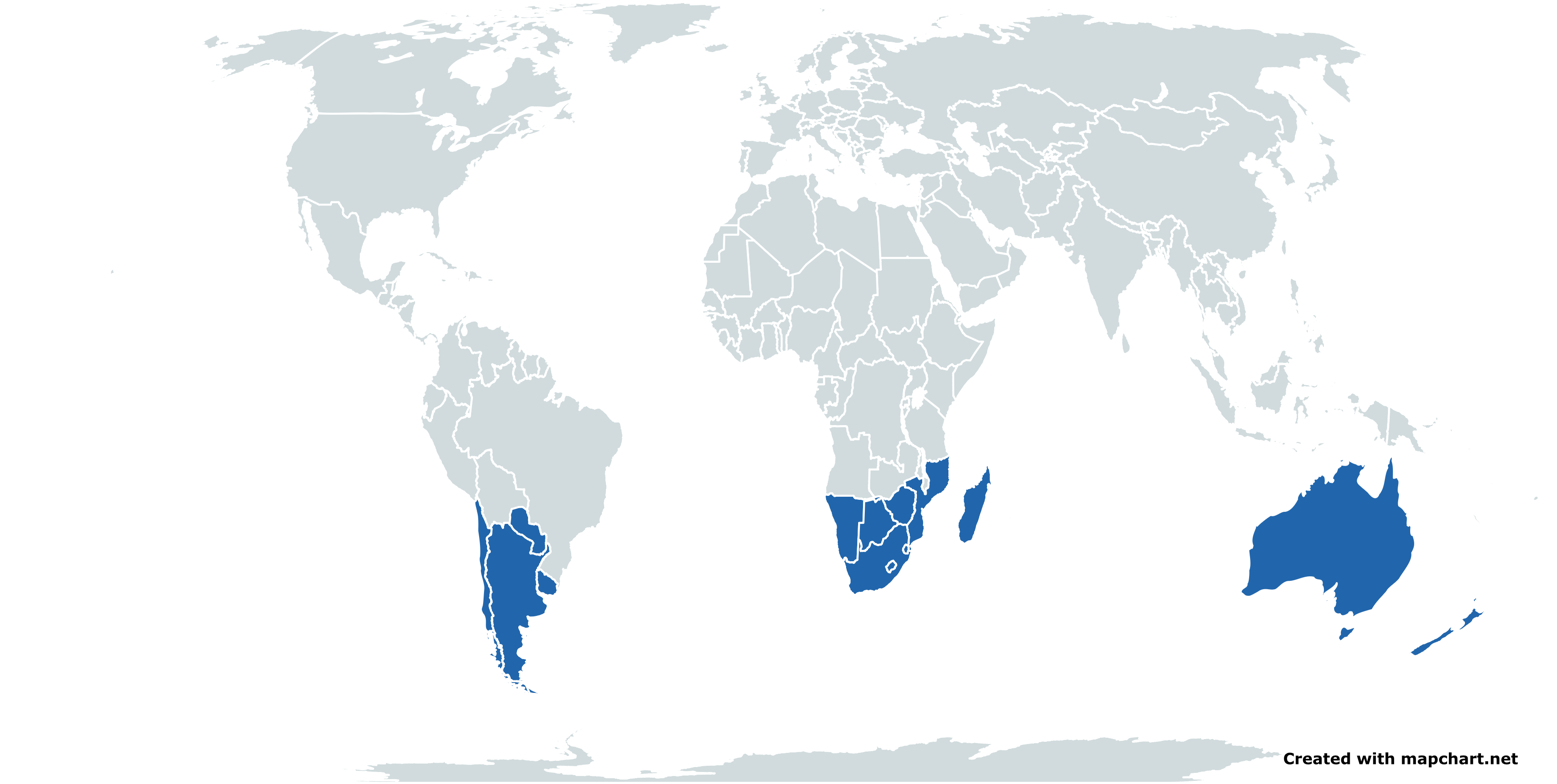
Countries entirely south of 10° S

Starting at the Prime Meridian and heading eastwards, the parallel 10° south passes through:

Coordinates	Country, territory or sea	Notes
10°0′S 0°0′E	Atlantic Ocean	
10°0′S 13°20′E	Angola	
10°0′S 22°12′E	Democratic Republic of the Congo	
10°0′S 28°38′E	Zambia	
10°0′S 33°20′E	Malawi	
10°0′S 33°57′E	Lake Malawi	
10°0′S 34°31′E	Tanzania	
10°0′S 39°49′E	Indian Ocean	Passing between islands in the Aldabra Group, Seychelles; Passing just north of Farquhar Atoll, Seychelles; Passing just north of the Agalega Islands, Mauritius
10°0′S 119°57′E	Indonesia	Island of Sumba
10°0′S 120°49′E	Savu Sea	
10°0′S 123°34′E	Indonesia	Island of Timor
10°0′S 124°34′E	Timor Sea	
10°0′S 131°19′E	Arafura Sea	
10°0′S 141°39′E	Coral Sea	Passing through the Torres Strait Islands, Australia
10°0′S 147°40′E	Papua New Guinea	Island of New Guinea
10°0′S 149°51′E	Solomon Sea	
10°0′S 150°54′E	Papua New Guinea	Normanby Island
10°0′S 151°17′E	Solomon Sea	Passing just south of the island of Guadalcanal, Solomon Islands
10°0′S 161°20′E	Pacific Ocean	Passing between the islands of South Malaita and Makira, Solomon Islands; Passing just south of the island of Ulawa, Solomon Islands; Passing between the Duff and Reef island groups, Solomon Islands; Passing between the atolls of Nukulaelae and Niulakita, Tuvalu
10°0′S 161°5′W	Cook Islands	Rakahanga atoll
10°0′S 161°4′W	Pacific Ocean	
10°0′S 150°15′W	Kiribati	Caroline Island
10°0′S 150°14′W	Pacific Ocean	
10°0′S 139°8′W	French Polynesia	Island of Tahuata
10°0′S 139°6′W	Pacific Ocean	
10°0′S 138°50′W	French Polynesia	Island of Mohotani
10°0′S 138°48′W	Pacific Ocean	
10°0′S 78°12′W	Peru	
10°0′S 72°10′W	Brazil / Peru border	
10°0′S 71°21′W	Peru	
10°0′S 70°37′W	Brazil	Acre
10°0′S 66°45′W	Bolivia	
10°0′S 65°19′W	Brazil	Rondônia; Mato Grosso; Tocantins; Maranhão; Piauí; Bahia; Sergipe; Alagoas
10°0′S 36°0′W	Atlantic Ocean	

== See also ==
- Circles of latitude between the Equator and the 5th parallel south
- Circles of latitude between the 10th parallel south and the 15th parallel south
