= Aru languages =

Subgroup of the Austronesian language family

Aru
- Geographic distribution: Indonesia (Aru Islands)
- Linguistic classification: Austronesian: Malayo-Polynesian; Central–Eastern; Aru
- Proto-language: Proto-Aru

Language codes
- Glottolog: aruu1241

The Aru languages are a group of a dozen Austronesian languages spoken on the Aru Islands in Indonesia. None are spoken by more than ten thousand people. Although geographically close to Central Maluku languages, they are not part of that group linguistically (Ross 1995).

== Languages ==
The following classification of the Aru languages is from Glottolog 4.0 (2019), and is arranged according to Hughes (1987: 96) since the Aru languages form an interconnected linkage or dialect chain:

- Aru
  - Ujir–Kola–Kompane
    - Ujir
    - Kola–Kompane
  - Central Aru
    - Lola
    - Dobel–Koba
    - Lorang
    - Manombai
  - West Tarangan
  - East Tarangan
  - Karey–Barakai
  - Batuley–Mariri
