= Batuley language =

Austronesian language spoken in Maluku, Indonesia

Batuley
- Native to: Indonesia
- Region: Aru Islands
- Native speakers: 3,600 (2011)
- Language family: Austronesian: Malayo-Polynesian; Central–Eastern; Aru; Batuley

Language codes
- ISO 639-3: bay
- Glottolog: batu1258

Batuley (Gwatle lir) is a language spoken on the Aru Islands of eastern Indonesia. It is close to Mariri. Hughes (1987) estimates that around 80% of lexical items are shared. The language's name comes from the Gwatle island (Batuley in Indonesian), which the Batuley consider their homeland (Daigle (2015)).

== Geographical distribution ==
Batuley is spoken in eastern Indonesia across seven villages that Daigle (2015) lists in his thesis. Some of them are Kabalsiang on Aduar Island, Kumul in the identically-named island, and Gwaria (Waria) in the Island of Gwari.

== Phonology ==
=== Vowels ===
Batuley has a simple five-vowel system with no vowel length distinction (Daigle 2015).

- i
- e
- u
- o
- a

[ɪ] is an allophone of /i/ and /e/ (in different environments). [e] is an allophone of /a/ when it does not receive the primary stress. Furthermore, /e/ and /i/ may both be reduced to a schwa in fast speech in certain conditions.

=== Consonants ===
Daigle (2015)

		Labial	Alveolar	Palatal	Velar
Nasal		m	n		ŋ
Plosive	voiceless		t		k
Plosive	voiced	b	d	ʤ	ɡ
Fricative		ɸ	s		
Rhotic			r		
Lateral			l		
Semivowel				j	w

== Lexicon ==
Daigle (2015)

- gwayor: water, fresh water
- gwari: island
- keiran: sister; branch
- lef: big house
- kai: wood, tree
- ban: chest, breast
- fol gwayer: breast milk (fol: breast, gwayer: its water)
- kaom: scorpion
- gwarfagfag: small fresh-water turtle
- kudomsai: cloud
- ror: dance (n)
- fulan: month
- sapato, safato: shoe (borrowing)
- solar: diesel fuel (borrowing)
- nol: zero (borrowing)
- fikir: think (borrowing)
- fuis: cat (borrowing)
- guru: teacher (borrowing)
- kartas: paper (borrowing)
- kasar: crack, split (borrowing)
- kofi: hat (borrowing)
- tata: older sibling (borrowing)
- tempo: year (borrowing)
- buku: book (borrowing)
