= Lorang language =

Austronesian language spoken in Maluku, Indonesia

Lorang
- Native to: Indonesia
- Region: Aru Islands
- Native speakers: 220 (2011)
- Language family: Austronesian: Malayo-Polynesian; Central–Eastern; Aru; Lorang

Language codes
- ISO 639-3: lrn
- Glottolog: lora1237

Lorang is an Austronesian language of the Aru Islands in eastern Indonesia. It is spoken in one village on Koba Island.
