= Decaisnina angustata =

Scientific classification
- Kingdom: Plantae
- Clade: Tracheophytes
- Clade: Angiosperms
- Clade: Eudicots
- Order: Santalales
- Family: Loranthaceae
- Genus: Decaisnina
- Species: D. angustata

Binomial name
- Decaisnina angustata (Barlow) Barlow
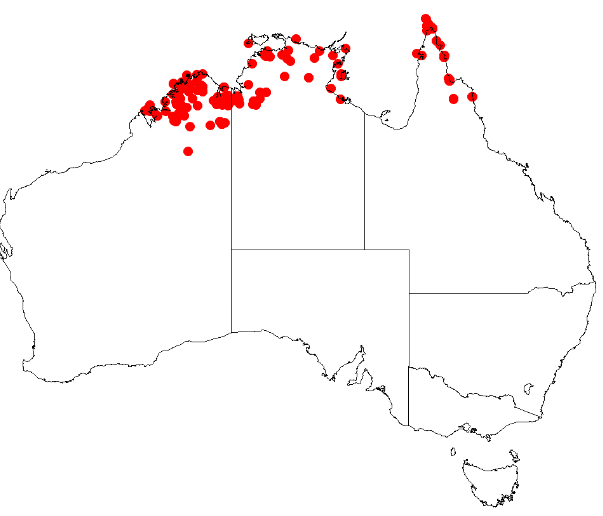
- Occurrence data from AVH

Species of epiphyte

Decaisnina angustata is a species of flowering plant, an epiphytic hemiparasitic plant of the family Loranthaceae native to the Northern Territory, northern Western Australia, and northern Queensland. It was first described in 1983 as Decaisnina petiolata subsp. angustata by Bryan Alwyn Barlow who subsequently raised it to species status in 1993.
