= Koba Island =

Island in Maluku Province, Indonesia

Native name: Pulau Koba
- Location within Maluku

Geography
- Coordinates: 6°23′34″S 134°29′40″E
- Archipelago: Aru Islands

Administration
- Indonesia
- Province: Maluku
- Regency: Aru Islands Regency

Additional information
- Time zone: IEST (UTC+09:00)

Koba Island is also an alternative name for Gupo Island, Taiwan.

Koba Island (Indonesian: Pulau Koba) is an island in the Aru Islands in the Arafura Sea. It is situated in the Maluku Province, Indonesia. Its area is 1723 km². The other main islands in the archipelago are Tanahbesar (also called Wokam), Kobroor, Kola, Maikoor, and Trangan.

== See also ==
- List of islands of Indonesia
