= Dobel language =

Austronesian language in Maluku

Dobel
- Kobro’or
- Native to: Indonesia
- Region: Aru Islands
- Native speakers: 5,700 (2011)
- Language family: Austronesian: Malayo-Polynesian; Central–Eastern; Aru; Dobel

Language codes
- ISO 639-3: kvo
- Glottolog: dobe1238

Dobel, or Kobro’or, is one of the Aru languages, spoken by inhabitants of the Aru Islands Regency, Indonesia. It is close to Kola.

== Dobel New Testament ==
In October 2025, the New Testament in Dobel was launched. It was the culmination of 40 years of work by Scots, Jock and Katy Hughes, who had worked on it since 1985 in partnership with Wycliffe Bible Translators.
