= Trangan =

Island in Indonesia

- Location within Maluku

Geography
- Location: Oceania
- Coordinates: 6.534941°S 134.348717°E
- Archipelago: Aru Islands

Administration
- Indonesia
- Province: Maluku
- Regency: Aru Islands Regency

Additional information
- Time zone: IEST (UTC+09:00)

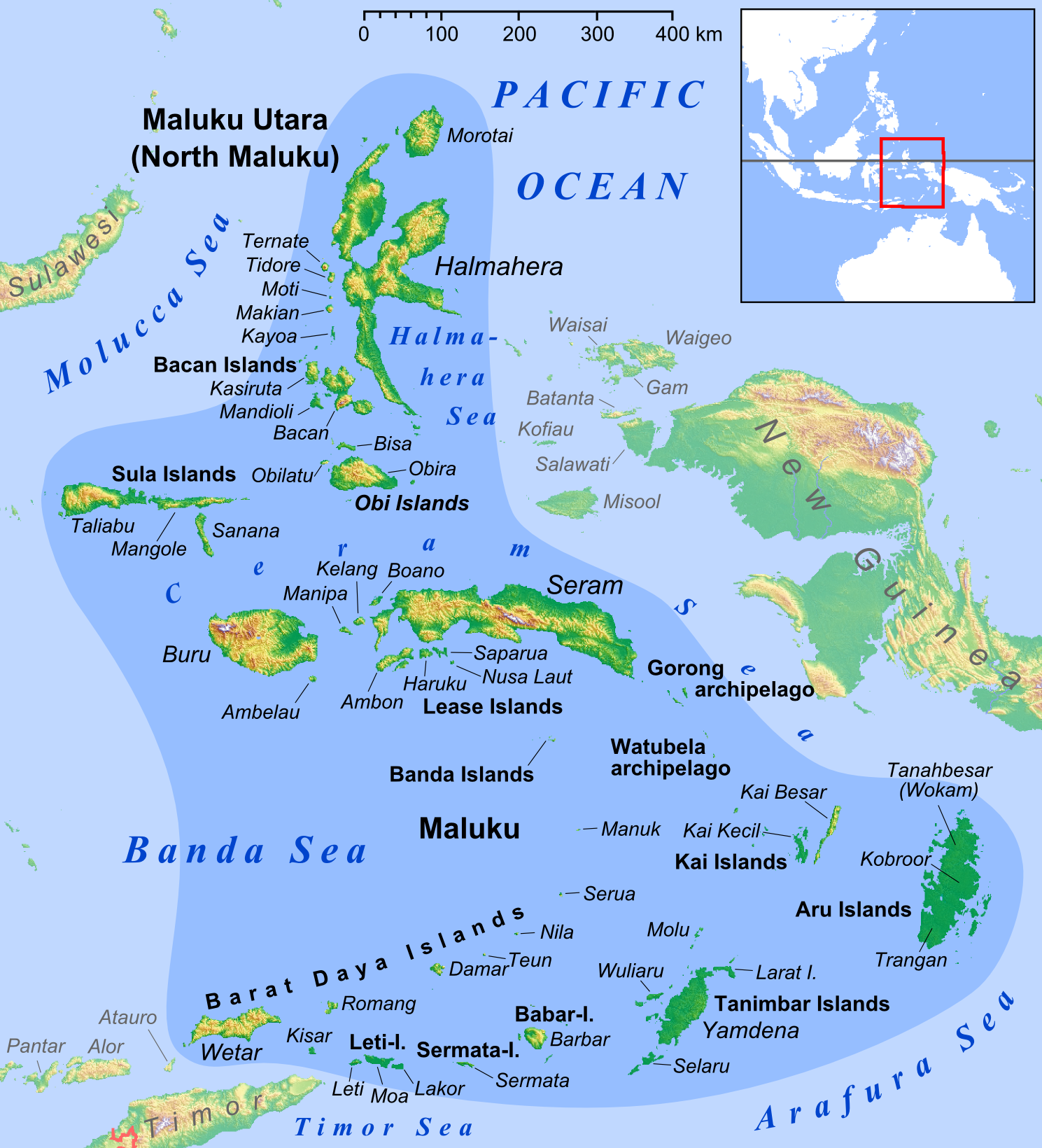
Maluku Islands

Trangan is an island in the Aru Islands in the Arafura Sea. It is situated in the Maluku Province of Indonesia. Its area is 2149 km^{2}. The other main islands in the archipelago are Tanahbesar (also called Wokam), Kola, Kobroor, Koba, and Maikoor.

Cassowary birds can be found in Trangan.
