= Manombai language =

Austronesian language spoken in Maluku, Indonesia

Manombai
- Woka
- Native to: Indonesia
- Region: Aru Islands
- Native speakers: 9,100 (2011)
- Language family: Austronesian: Malayo-Polynesian; Central–Eastern; Aru; Manombai

Language codes
- ISO 639-3: woo
- Glottolog: mano1275

Manombai (also known as Wokam) is one of the Aru languages, spoken by inhabitants of the Aru Islands, Indonesia.
