= Tanahbesar =

Island in Maluku, Indonesia

- Location within Maluku

Geography
- Location: Oceania
- Coordinates: 5°48′17″S 134°33′00″E
- Archipelago: Aru Islands
- Area: 1,604 km^{2} (619 sq mi)

Administration
- Indonesia
- Province: Maluku
- Regency: Aru Islands Regency

Additional information
- Time zone: IEST (UTC+09:00)

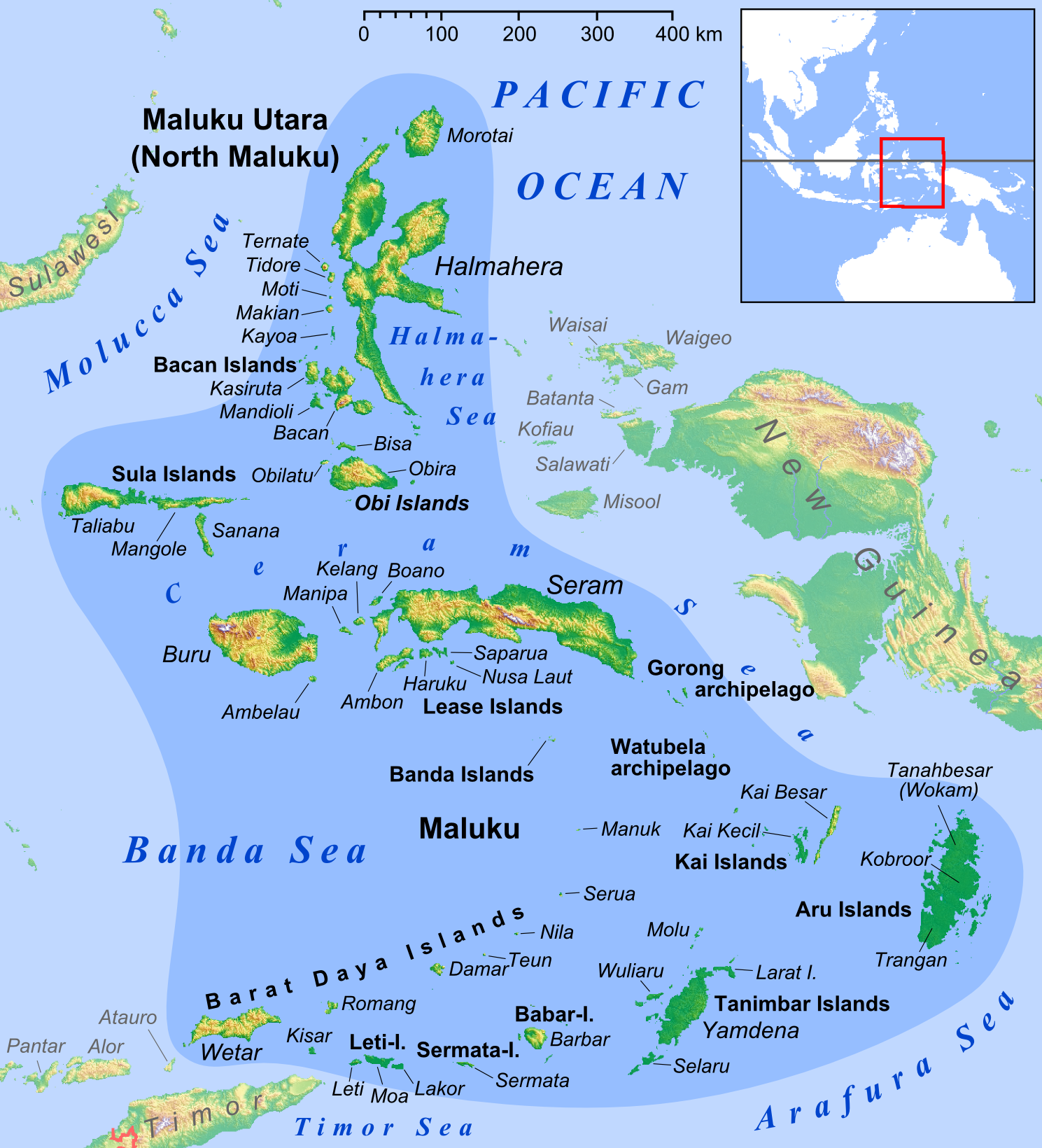
Map of Maluku Islands

Tanahbesar (or Wokam) is one of the four main islands in the Aru Islands Regency in the Arafura Sea. Its area is 1604 km². It is situated in the Maluku Province, Indonesia. The other main islands in the archipelago are Kobroor, Kola, Maikoor, Koba and Trangan.
