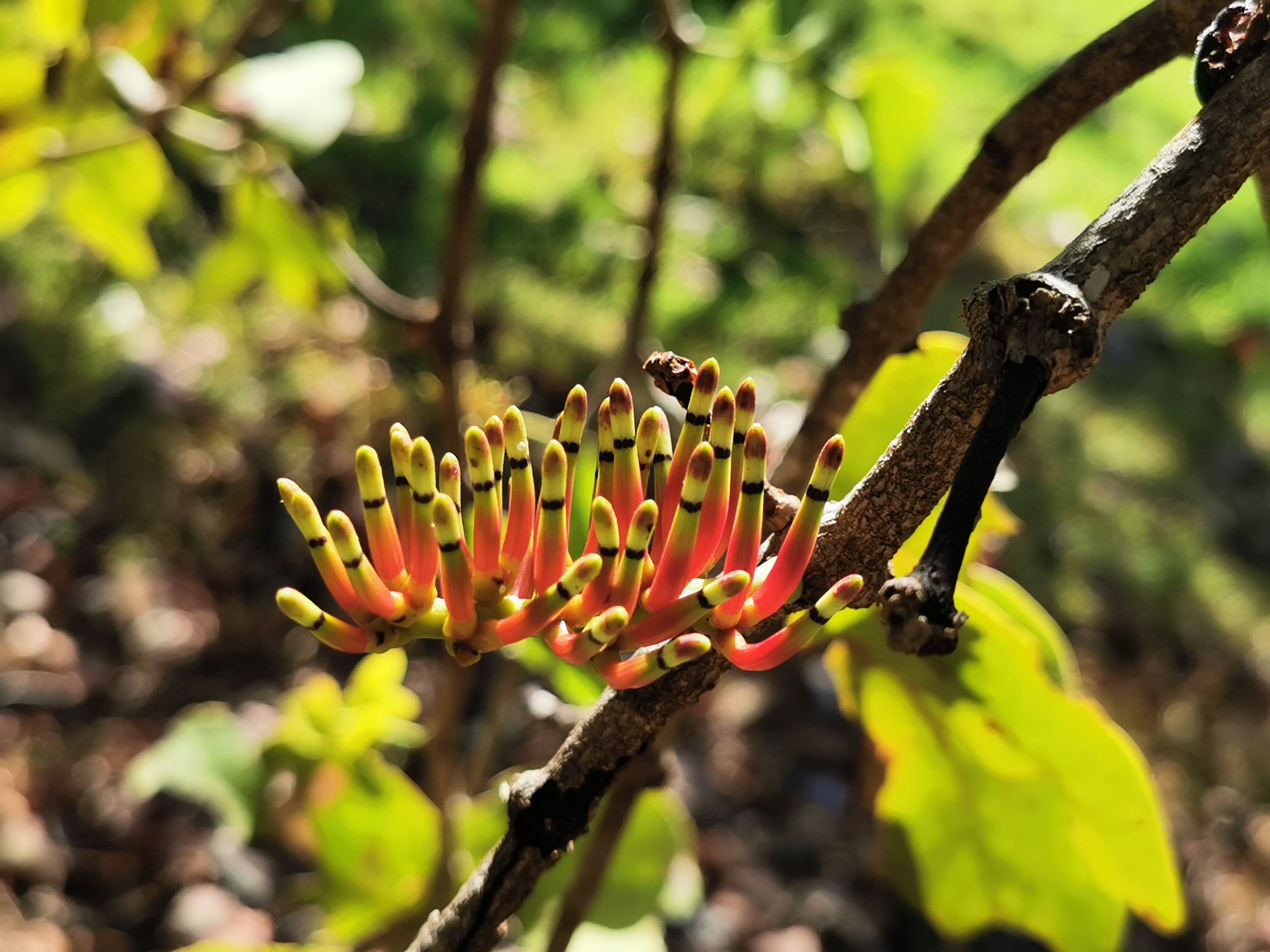

Scientific classification
- Kingdom: Plantae
- Clade: Tracheophytes
- Clade: Angiosperms
- Clade: Eudicots
- Order: Santalales
- Family: Loranthaceae
- Genus: Decaisnina
- Species: D. signata

Binomial name
- Decaisnina signata (F.Muell. ex Benth.) Tiegh.
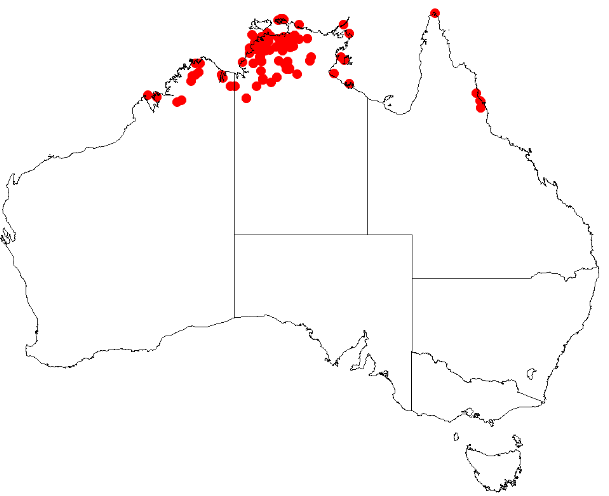
- Occurrence data from AVH

= Decaisnina signata =

Species of plant

Decaisnina signata is a species of flowering plant, an epiphytic hemiparasitic plant of the family Loranthaceae native to Australia. It is found from Cape York to the Kimberleys.

It was first described by Ferdinand von Mueller as Loranthus signatus in 1867 in George Bentham's Flora Australiensis, but was assigned to the genus, Decaisnina, by Philippe van Tieghem in 1895.

== Description ==
Decaisnina signata is a spreading to pendulous plant, with terete internodes. The paired leaves are lanceolate to nearly orbicular, truncate or cordate at their base, and sessile or almost sessile, with the leaf blade 4–15 cm by 2.5-5.5 cm. The leaves are dull on both sides and have distinct venation. The inflorescence axis is 3–6 cm long and carries from 4 to 9 pairs of triads on peduncles which are 1 to 5 mm long. The flowers are sessile. The corolla is slender, from 2.4 to 3.2 cm long, and is red below, green or yellow above, and often has a brown or dark red band near the apex. The fruit is ovoid to nearly globose, and about 10 mm long.

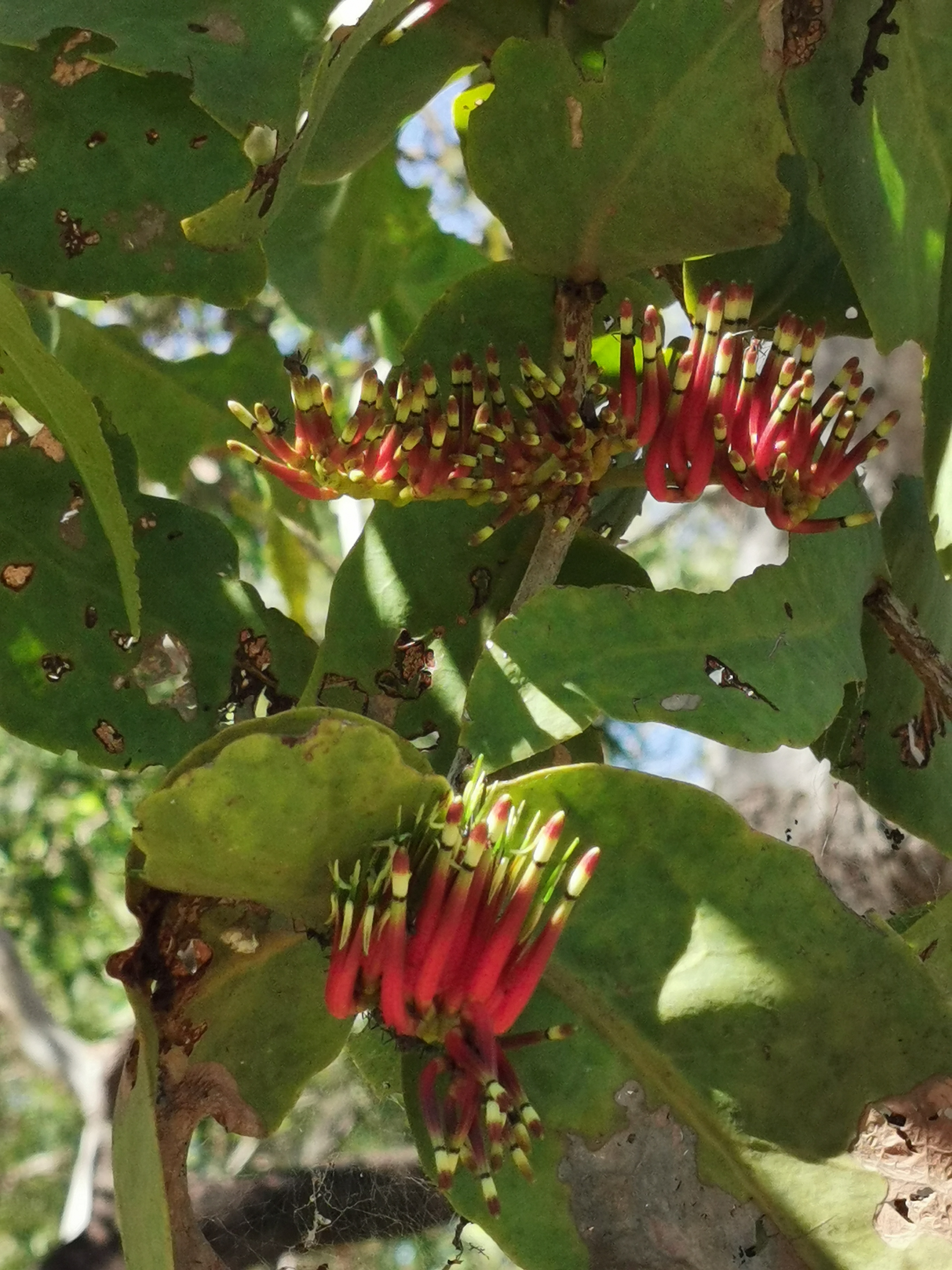

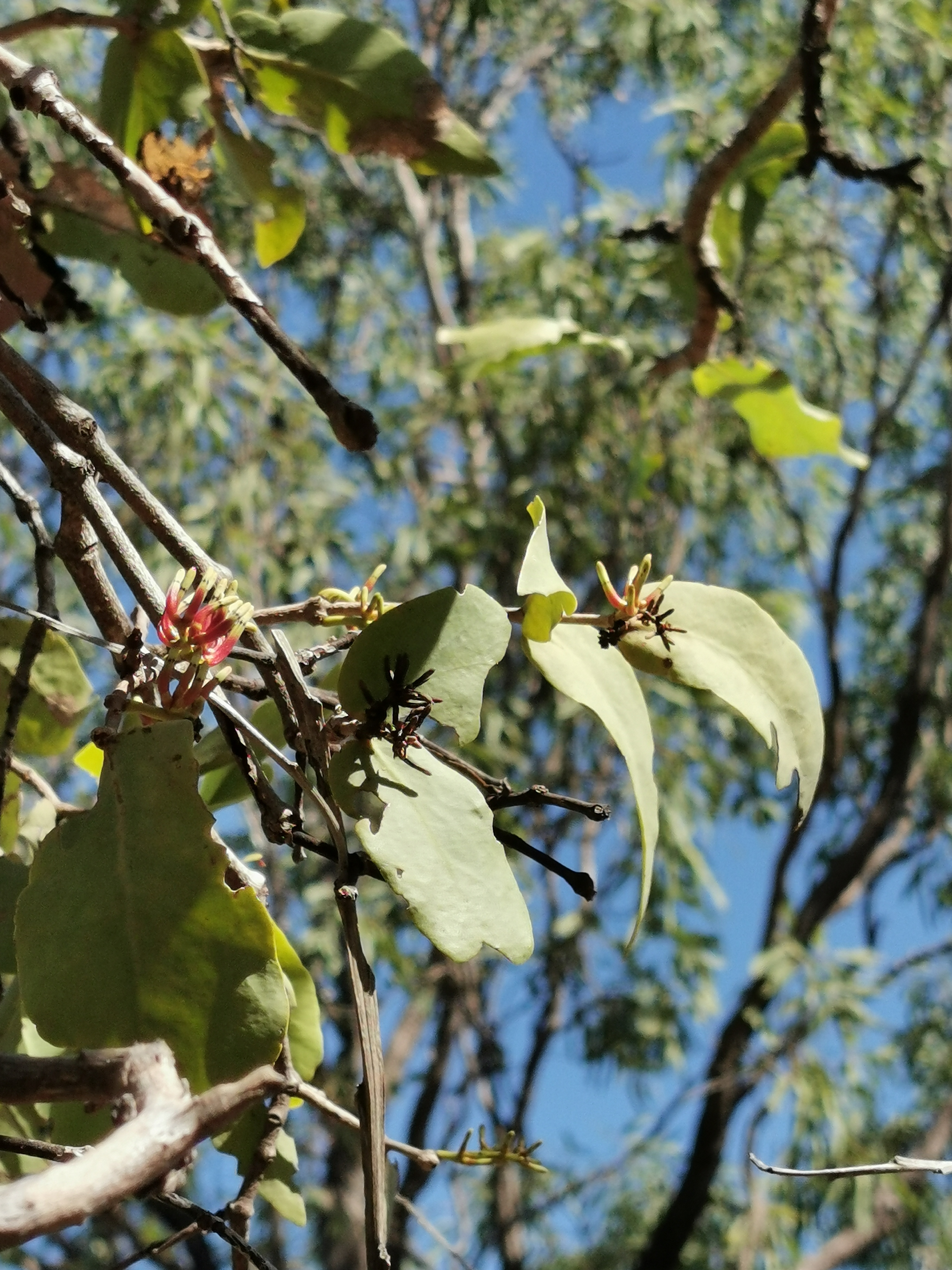

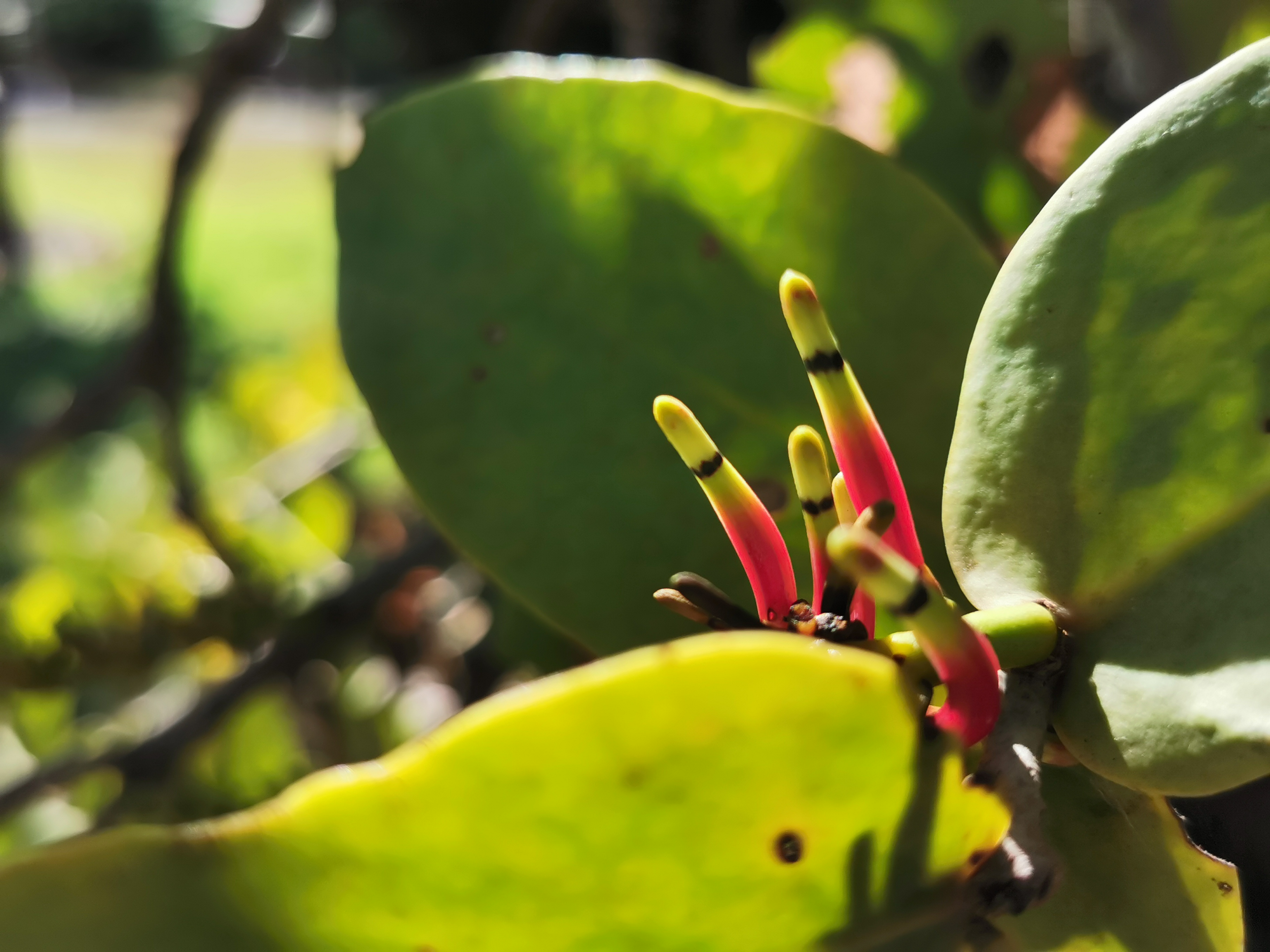

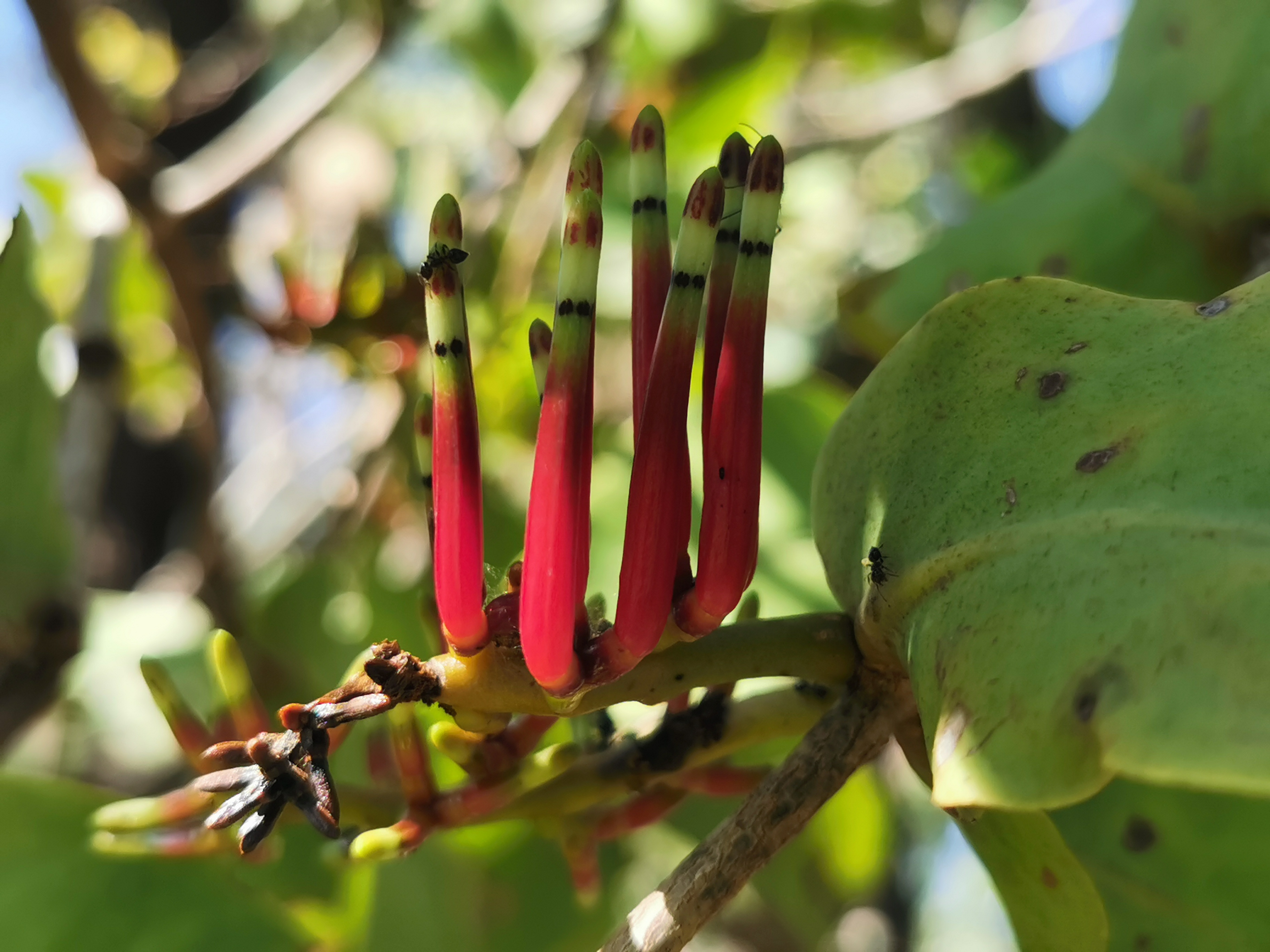
