= Aru Islands Regency =

Regency in Maluku, Indonesia

Aru Islands Regency Kabupaten Kepulauan Aru
- Regency
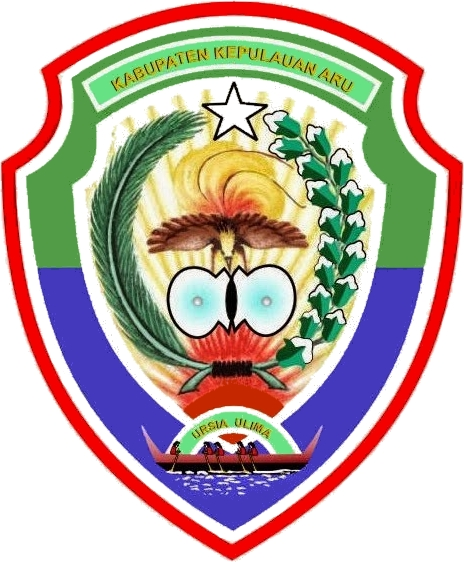
- Coat of arms
- Motto: Sita Kaka Walikewalike / Sita Eka Tu Jargaria
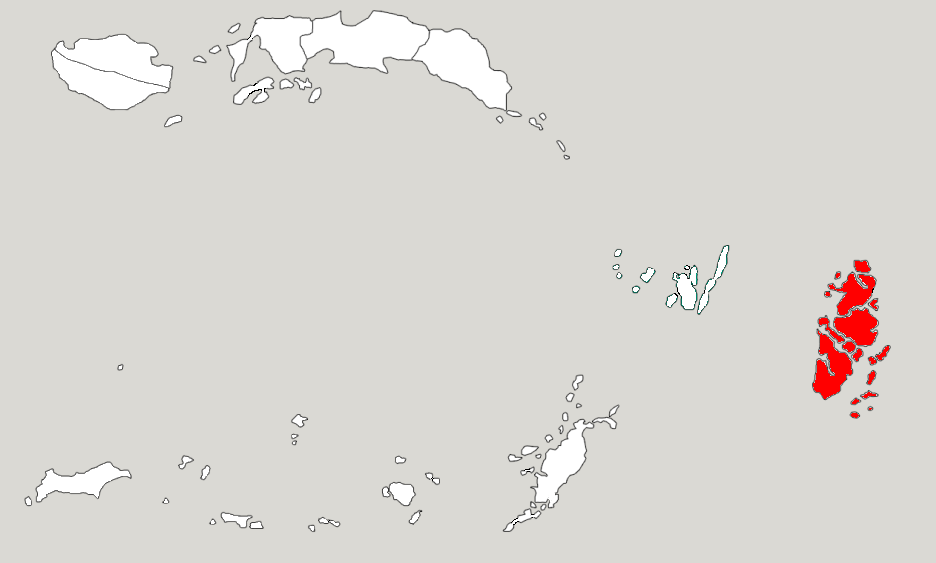

- Location in Maluku and Indonesia Aru Islands Regency (Indonesia)
- Coordinates: 6°12′S 134°30′E
- Country: Indonesia
- Province: Maluku
- Capital: Dobo

Government
  - Regent: Timotius Kaidel
  - Vice Regent: Mohamad Djumpa

Area
  - Total: 6,426.77 km^{2} (2,481.39 sq mi)

Population (mid 2024 estimate)
  - Total: 112,531
  - Density: 17.5097/km^{2} (45.3500/sq mi)
- Time zone: UTC+09:00 (IEST)
- Area code: (+62) 917
- Website: keparukab.go.id

The Aru Islands Regency (Indonesian: Kabupaten Kepulauan Aru) is a group of about 95 low-lying islands in the Maluku Islands of eastern Indonesia. It also forms a regency of Maluku Province, with a land area of 6,426.77 km^{2} (2,481.39 sq mi). At the 2011 Census the Regency had a population of 84,138; the 2020 Census produced a total of 102,237, and the official estimate as at mid 2024 was 112,531 (comprising 57,767 males and 54,764 females). Some sources regard the archipelago as part of Asia, while others regard it as part of Melanesia.

== Geography ==
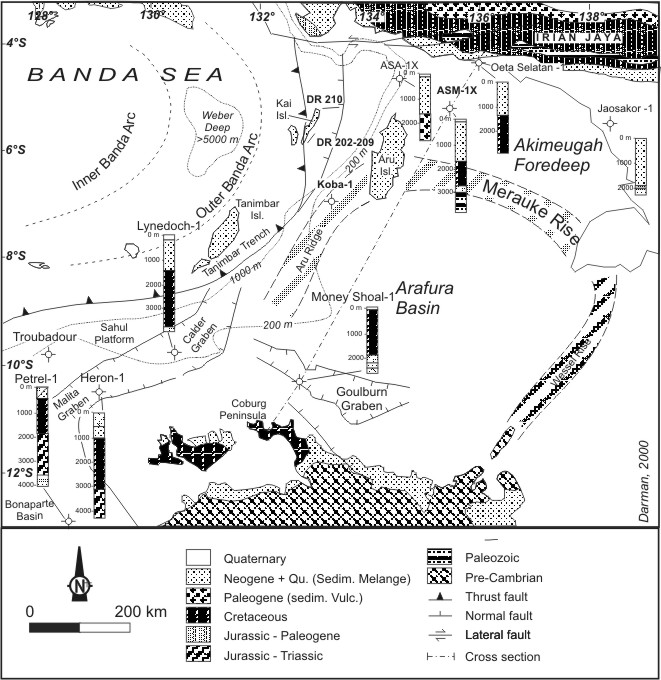
Geologic map of Aru Islands

The Aru Islands are the easternmost archipelago in Maluku province, and are located in the Arafura Sea south of West Papua (province), New Guinea and north of Australia. The total area of the islands is 6,426.77 km^{2} (2,481.39 sq mi). The largest island is Tanahbesar (also called Wokam); Dobo, the chief port of the islands, is on Wamar, just off Tanahbesar. The other five main islands are Kola, Kobroor, Maikoor, Koba, and Trangan. Altogether there are some 676 islands, of which 28 are inhabited. The main islands rise to low hills, and are separated by meandering channels. Geologically, unlike the rest of Maluku, the group is part of the Australian continent, along with New Guinea, Tasmania, Waigeo, and Raja Ampat on the Australian Plate.

The Aru Islands are covered by a mix of tropical moist broadleaf forests, savanna, and mangroves. The islands lie on the Australia-New Guinea continental shelf, and were connected to Australia and New Guinea by land when sea levels were lower during the ice ages. The flora and fauna of Aru are part of the Australasian realm, and closely related to that of New Guinea. Aru is part, together with much of western New Guinea, of the Vogelkop-Aru lowland rain forests terrestrial ecoregion.

As part of the political and administrative decentralization of Indonesia since Suharto stepped down in 1998, the Aru Islands were created as a separate regency (kabupaten) on 18 December 2003, headquartered at Dobo, and split off from the Southeast Maluku Regency.

== History ==
1837 Map of Islands close to Arafuru Sea

1922 Map of Islands close to Arafuru Sea

The Aru Islands have a long history as a part of extensive trading networks throughout what is now eastern Indonesia. Precolonial links were especially strong to the Banda Islands, and Bugis and Makasarese traders also visited regularly. The traditional society was not pronounced hierarchical, being based on lineage-based clans where the members shared duties of hospitality and cooperation. These island communities were divided into two ritual bonds called Ursia and Urlima, a socio-political system found in many parts of Maluku. Such alliances were connected to pre-European trade networks.

The islands were sighted and also possibly visited by some Portuguese navigators, such as Martim Afonso de Melo, in 1522–24, who sighted the islands and wintered on a nearby island or of the Aru archipelago itself, and possibly by Gomes de Sequeira, in 1526, as is pointed out in the cartography of the time. The Spanish navigator Álvaro de Saavedra sighted the islands on 12 June 1528, when trying to return from Tidore to New Spain.

The islands were colonized by the Dutch, beginning with a contract with the west coast villages in 1623, though initially the Dutch East India Company (VOC) was one of several trading groups in the area, with limited influence over the islands' internal affairs. Aru was monitored by the VOC establishment in the Banda Islands, and yielded a variety of products including trepang, birds-of-paradise, parrots, pearls, sago, turtle-shell, and slaves. A Dutch post was established on Wokam Island in 1659, and a small fort was subsequently constructed there. Islam as well as Reformed Protestantism began to make small numbers of converts in the 1650s. Discontent with the commercial monopolies imposed by the VOC came to a boiling point in the late 18th century. The anti-Dutch rebellion of the Tidore prince Nuku (d. 1805), which engulfed much of Maluku, also affected Aru. The Muslim population of Ujir Island accepted Nuku's brother Jou Mangofa as their king, exterminated the Dutch garrison in 1787, and were able to dominate large parts of the islands. After several failed attempts, the Dutch of Banda managed to suppress the rebels in 1791. However, they soon ran into new trouble with the coastal populations in the east, and their control of Aru affairs was disrupted by British intervention in the East Indies after 1795.

After being left to its own devices for many years, Aru was again visited in 1824 by the Dutch naval officer A.J. Bik, who concluded a number of agreements with local chiefs. In 1857 the famous naturalist Alfred Russel Wallace visited the islands. His visit later made him realize that the Aru Islands must have been connected by a land bridge to mainland New Guinea during the ice age.

In the nineteenth century, Dobo, Aru's largest town, temporarily became an important regional trading center, serving as a meeting point for Dutch, Makasarese, Chinese, and other traders. The period from the 1880s to 1917 saw a backlash against this outside influence by a spiritually-based movement among local residents to rid the islands of outsiders.

== Economy ==
Throughout its history, the Aru Islands exported luxury natural products like birds-of-paradise, turtle shells, and pearls to Asia and later Europe. While the islands were positioned within the global trade network, local Aru society was able to preserve its independence and egalitarianism.

Pearl farming continues to provide a major source of income for the islands. The Aru pearl industry has been criticized in the national media for allegedly maintaining exploitative debt structures that bind the local men who dive for pearls to outside boat owners and traders in an unequal relationship.

Other export products include sago, coconuts, tobacco, mother of pearl, trepang (an edible sea cucumber, which is dried and cured), tortoiseshell, and bird-of-paradise plumes.

In November 2011, the Government of Indonesia awarded two oil-and-gas production-sharing contracts (PSC) about two hundred km (124 mi) west of the Aru Islands to BP. The two adjacent offshore exploration PSCs, West Aru I and II, cover an area of about 16,400 km^{2} (6,300 sq mi) with water depths ranging from 200 to 2,500 m (660 to 8,200 ft). BP plans to acquire seismic data over the two blocks.

== Demographics ==
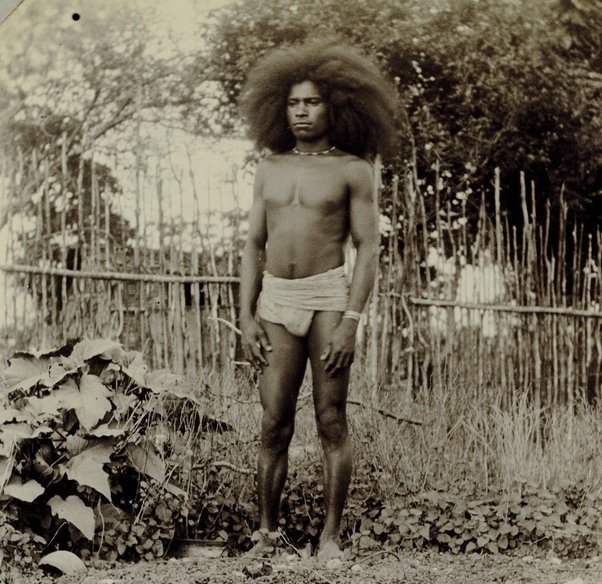
A man native to the Aru Islands, date unknown.

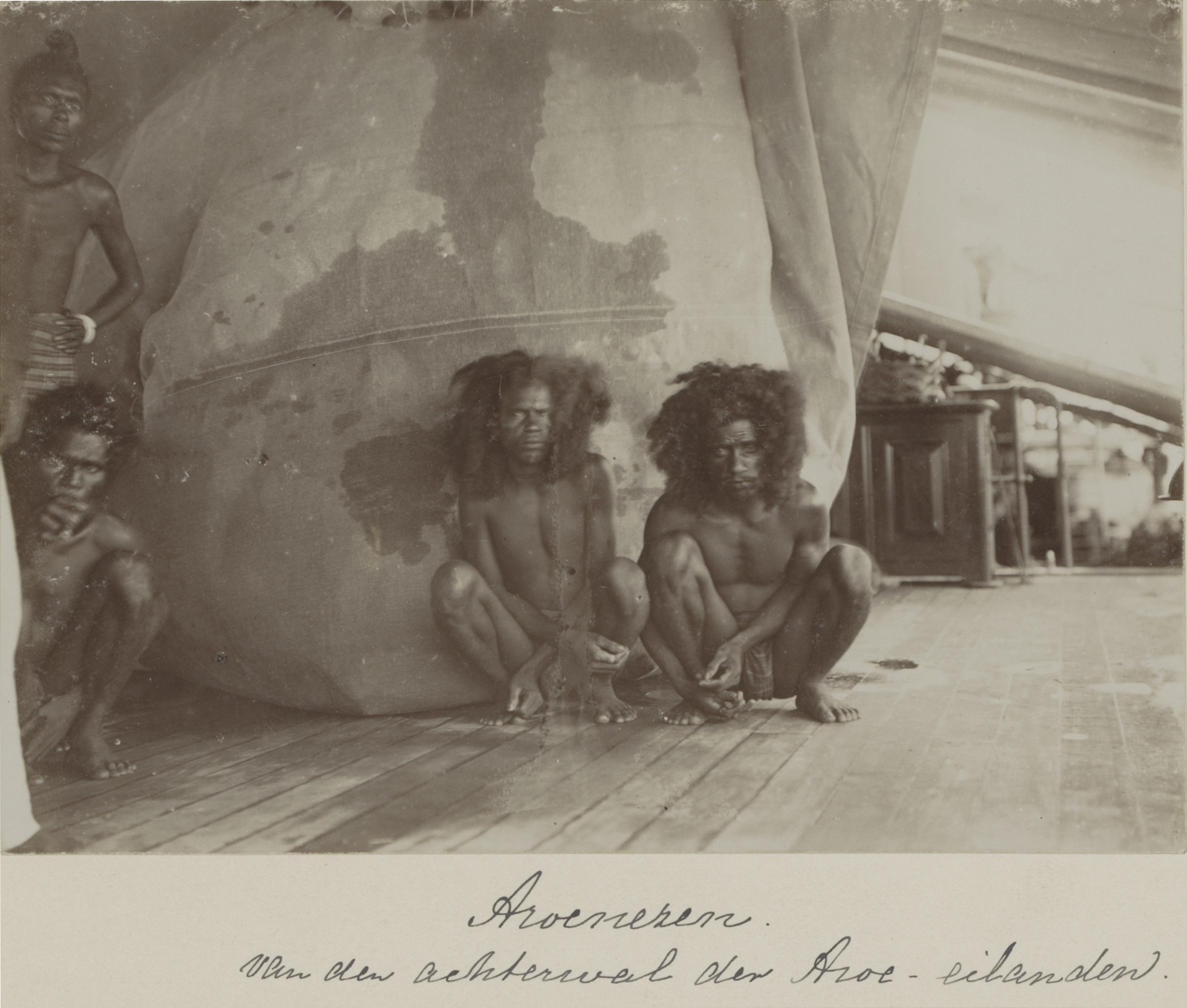
Inhabitants of the eastern coast of the Aru Islands, photographed late 1899 during the Siboga Expedition.

The islands had a population of 84,138 at the 2010 Census; the 2020 Census produced a total of 102,237, and the official estimate as at mid 2024 was 112,531. Most indigenous islanders are of mixed Austronesian and Papuan descent. Fourteen languages – Barakai, Batuley, Dobel, Karey, Koba, Kola, Kompane, Lola, Lorang, Manombai, Mariri, East Tarangan, West Tarangan, and Ujir – are indigenous to Aru. They belong to the Central Malayo-Polynesian languages, and are related to the other languages of Maluku, Nusa Tenggara, and Timor. Ambonese Malay is also spoken on Wamar. All are members of the Austronesian language family.

The population is mostly Christian with a small Muslim minority. Figures cited by Glenn Dolcemascolo for 1993 were approximately 90% Protestant, 6% Catholic, and 4% Muslim. A more recent report from 2007 suggested that the 4% Muslim figure may only relate to the indigenous population and that the actual percentage of Muslims may be significantly higher.

At the 2010 census, the population consisted of Protestants (59.84%), Catholics (9.32%), Muslims (29.97%), Hindus (0.05%), Buddhists (0.03%), Confucians (0.02%), others (0.01%), and those not asked (0.75%).

Islam is thought to have been introduced to the islands in the late 15th century. By the early 17th century, it was reported by the Dutch that Makassarese seafarers had converted some locals and constructed mosques. However, it only took root in the mid-17th century, primarily in the Ujir-speaking territory on the western side.

The Dutch brought Christianity in the 17th and 18th centuries but much of the conversion of the population to Christianity did not take place until the 20th century.

== Administration ==
At the time of the 2010 Census, the regency was divided into seven districts (kecamatan), but subsequently an additional three districts have been created by the splitting of existing districts. The districts are tabulated below with their areas (in km^{2}) and their populations at the 2010 Census and 2020 Census, together with the official estimates as at mid 2024. The table also includes the locations of the district administrative centres, the number of administrative villages in each district (totaling 80 rural desa and 2 urban kelurahan), and its postal code.

Kode Wilayah	Name of District (kecamatan)	English name	Area in km^{2}	Pop'n Census 2010	Pop'n Census 2020	Pop'n Estimate mid 2024	Admin centre	No. of villages	Post code
81.07.01	Pulau-Pulau Aru	(Northwest Aru)	907.39	36,604	49,020	54,433	Dobo	15 ^{(a)}	97662
81.07.04	Aru Utara	North Aru	531.28	11,529	6,195	6,724	Marlasi	12	97660
81.07.05	Aru Utara Timur Batuley	Northeast Aru	304.78	^{(b)}	4,365	5,209	Kobamar	9	97663
81.07.06	Sir-Sir		528.39	^{(b)}	3,197	3,622	Leiting	9	97664
81.07.03	Aru Tengah	Central Aru	1,372.06	13,824	13,345	13,971	Benjina	22	97661
81.07.07	Aru Tengah Timur	East Central Aru	659.75	4,315	4,914	5,185	Koijabi	13	97665
81.07.08	Aru Tengah Selatan	South Central Aru	295.113	5,086	5,994	6,426	Longgar	7	97669
81.07.02	Aru Selatan	South Aru	833.12	8,694	7,497	8,216	Jerol	15	97667
81.07.10	Aru Selatan Utara	Northern South Aru	478.31	^{(c)}	3,668	3,901	Tabarfane	7	97668
81.07.09	Aru Selatan Timur	Southeast Aru	516.58	4,714	4,039	4,844	Meror	10	97666
	Totals		6,426.77	84,138	102,237	112,531	Dobo	119	

Notes: (a) including 2 kelurahan – Siwalima (with an area of 3.36 km^{2}, and with 32,213 inhabitants as at mid 2023) and Galay Dubu (with an area of 1.0 km^{2}, and with 9,634 inhabitants), together forming Dobo town.
(b) the 2010 population of Aru Utara Timur Batuley and Sir-Sir Districts are included in the figure for Aru Utara District, from which they were split.
(c) the 2010 population of Aru Selatan Utara District is included in the figures for the districts from which it was split.

== Transportation ==
As an archipelagic regency, the Aru Islands depend heavily on sea transportation for the movement of people and goods between islands. Dobo serves as the main transportation and economic centre and has the highest level of connectivity in the regency.

Air transportation is provided through Rar Gwamar Airport, the regency's main air gateway. The regency also has a private airfield located in Benjina, Central Aru District.

== See also ==
- List of islands of Indonesia
- Aru languages
