= Ujir language =

Austronesian language spoken in Maluku, Indonesia

Ujir
- Native to: Indonesia
- Region: Aru Islands
- Native speakers: 1,000 (2011)
- Language family: Austronesian: Malayo-Polynesian; Central–Eastern; Aru; Ujir

Language codes
- ISO 639-3: udj
- Glottolog: ujir1237
- ELP: Ujir

Ujir is an Aru language spoken on the Aru Islands of eastern Indonesia, spoken in the villages of Ujir and Samang in northwestern Aru. As of 2015, it is highly endangered, since it is only spoken by a small fraction of the population of the two villages.
