= Johann Wilhelm Krause (botanist) =

German botanist

Johann Wilhelm Krause (1764–1842) was a German botanist. His botanical abbreviation is Krause.

Described species:

- Avena sativa var. praegravis Krause, 1837
