= Northern Bantoid languages =

Branch of the Bantoid family of Niger–Congo languages

Northern Bantoid
- North Bantoid
- Geographic distribution: Nigeria and Cameroon
- Linguistic classification: Niger–Congo?: Atlantic–Congo; Volta-Congo; Benue–Congo; Bantoid; Northern Bantoid
- Proto-language: Proto-Northern Bantoid
- Subdivisions: Mambiloid; Dakoid; Tikar

Language codes
- ISO 639-3: –
- Glottolog: nort3168

Northern Bantoid (or North Bantoid) is a branch of the Bantoid languages. It consists of the Mambiloid, Dakoid, and Tikar languages of eastern Nigeria and west-central Cameroon.

== History ==
A proposal that divided Bantoid into North and South Bantoid was introduced by Williamson.

Blench argues for the unity of North Bantoid by citing phonological, lexical, and morphological evidence.

== Internal classification ==
Blench classifies these languages as North Bantoid.

- Tikar (divergent)
- Mambiloid (possibly including the divergent Ndoro–Fam languages)
- Dakoid

== Language contact ==
Dakoid languages have had long-term contact with Adamawa languages, while the Tikar language shares many similarities with the Bafia languages (also known as the A50 Bantu languages).

== Maps ==
Map of the Bantoid languages of Nigeria and Cameroon

Map of the Mambiloid languages

Map of the Dakoid languages

Map of the Fam language

== Numerals ==
Comparison of numerals in individual languages:

Classification	Language	1	2	3	4	5	6	7	8	9	10
Dakoid	Chamba-Daka	nòòní	bààrá	tárā	nààsá	túùná	túnìn	dùtím	dùtím-kə́rə́rə́ (7+ 1)	kúūm	kúūm-kə́rə́rə́ (9+ 1)
Mambiloid, Mambila-Konja, Konja	Kwanja (Konja)	mán	fèè	tar	nàà	cùn	cánmán (5+ 1)	cɛnfèè (5+ 2)	cɛtar (5+ 3)	cɛnàà (5+ 4)	bɨfɛ́ŋ
Mambiloid, Mambila-Konja, Konja	Twendi (Cambap)	tʃínī	fèː	táːr	nɑː̀	tʃúên	tʃɛ́n də̄r tʃínī (5+ 1)	tʃɛ́n fèjè (5+ 2)	tʃɛ́táːr (5+ 3)	tʃɛ́n nàː (5+ 4)	jūtār
Mambiloid, Mambila-Konja, Magu-Kamkam-Kila	Somyev (Kila Yang)	mwē	hàːn	tàːr	nàːn	tíɛ̂n	tɛ́mwē (5+ 1)	tɛ́nàːn (5+ 2)	tɛ́ntàːr (5+ 3)	tɛ́nnàːn (5+ 4)	tʃɔ́ŋ
Mambiloid, Mambila-Konja, Mambila	Cameroun Mambila	tʃɛ́n	fàl	taɡár	neà	tîn	téndʒɛ́n (5+ 1)	tébɛl (5+ 2)	téndɛle (5+ 3)	tárɛ̀neà (5+ 4)	julà
Mambiloid, Mambila-Konja, Mambila	Nigerian Mambila	tʃɛ́n * c = tʃ	fàl	tar	nà	tín	téndʒɛ́n (5+ 1) * j = dʒ	téfɛ́l (5+ 2)	téndɛll (5+ 3)	tárɛ́nà (5+ 4)	jullà * y = j
Mambiloid, Ndoro	Ndoola (Doori) (1)	jér	hàːlā	tāːɾā	njẽ́	sónī	sóŋ kér (5+ 1)	sóŋ kwàlà (5+ 2)	sóŋ tāːrā (5+ 3)	sóŋ njẽ́ (5+ 4)	jóbə̄t
Mambiloid, Ndoro	Ndoola (Doori) (2)	jíɾə̀	hàːlā	tāːɾā	njã́	sónī	ʃóŋkíɾə̀ (5+ 1)	ʃóŋkwàlà (5+ 2)	ʃóŋtāːrā (5+ 3)	ʃóŋnjá (5+ 4)	jóbə̄t
Mambiloid, Suga-Vute, Suga	Suga (Nizaa)	mum	ɓaara	taara	naànà	tɛ́ɛ́ŋna	tánmum (5+ 1)	tánɓáára (5+ 2)	sɛ́ɛ̀	tínáànà (5+ 4)	ɟer
Mambiloid, Suga-Vute, Vute	Vute (1)	mwĩ	ɓɨrɨ́b / ɓaám	taarɨ́b	nààsɨ̀b	ŋɡiiì	tínmwĩ (5+ 1; old #5 is tíŋ)	tɨɓáam (5+ 2)	sə́r	ɓwécṍ	cóóŋ
Mambiloid, Suga-Vute, Vute	Vute (2)	mūí	ɓāám / ɓɨ̄rɨ́p	tāārɨ́p	nààsɨ́b	ŋɡīì	tín mūí (5+ 1)	tɨ́ ɓāám (5+ 2)	sə́r	ɓwé cóŋ (? 10 )	cóŋ
Mambiloid, Suga-Vute, Vute	Wawa (1)	mǒsī; mǒī *	bə̀mbə́	tābə́	nǎrə̄bə̀	téēnbə̄	té-mōī (5+ 1)	té-bə̀mbə́ (5+ 2)	tén-tābə́ (5+ 3)	té-nàrə̄bə́ (5+ 4)	tʃɔ́ŋ / bə̌ntə̄
Mambiloid, Suga-Vute, Vute	Wawa (2)	mʊ́ɾsī	bɔ̄mbə̀	tábə̀	náɾbə̀	tɛ̄nbə́	tɛ̄mʊ́ɪ / dʒuiɡɔ (5+ 1) *	tɛ́bɔ̀mbə̀ / dʒuididi (5+ 2)	tɛ́nàɾbə̀ / dʒuitati (5+ 3)	tɛ́tàbə̀ / dʒuːənai (5+ 4)	tʃɔ̄ŋ (< from Vute)
Beboid	Bebe (Naami)	mʷɛ	bifʷé	bitɔ	binwà	bitîŋ	buɬɔ	fùmáɲàŋ (8 - 1)	ɲàŋ	fùmájufi (10 - 1)	jufi
Beboid	Cung (Mbuk) (1)	ḿmū	fā	tálé	n̄nā	ítī	só	ńnānítá	ńɲáŋ	bʷùkə̀	dʒófí
Beboid	Cung (Chung) (2)	mu	fa	tale	ə́nà	tè	so	nânita	ɲaŋ	bùkə	dʒofi
Beboid	Kemedzung (1)	mò (miu) / kɨ̀tɨ́ kɨ́mó (Gender 7/8)	fé / bɨ̀tɨ́ bífé	té / bɨ̀tɨ́ bíté	nà / bɨ̀tɨ́ bínɑ̀	tɨ̀ŋ / bɨ̀tɨ́ bítɨ̀ŋ	búsí / bɨ̀tɨ́ búsí	fùmbá / bɨ̀tɨ́ fùmbɑ́	yàŋ / bɨ̀tɨ́ yàŋ	fùmbóò / bɨ̀tɨ́ fùmbóò	yɔ́(yɔfu) / bɨ̀tɨ́ yɔ́(yɔfu)
Beboid	Kemedzung (2)	mmȍ	bifɛ́	bitɛ	binà	bitɨ̃̀	buse	fũ̀mbà	jã̏	fũ̀mbɔ̀	jɔ̀ː
Beboid	Naki	āmū	ífə	ítāt	īnāː	ítɪː	úsiː	fùmádʒâŋ (? 8)	dʒàŋ	fùmádzófu (? 10)	dzófú
Beboid	Nchane (Mungong) (1)	m⁴ba³ka⁴	fĩ³	tə³lə²	nə³⁴	tĩ³⁴	so³⁴	bu³so³fwɪ⁴	nja³⁴	bvu³kə⁴	ju³fə⁴
Beboid	Nchane (Ncane) (2)	mɪ3ma4	fɛː2	tʰɛ3dɪ3	nɛ34	tʰəŋ34	bu3so23	bu3so3ʃwɪ23	ɲa34	bvu3ɡə2	ʒu3fɛ4
Beboid	Noone (Noni)	māŋ̀	fɛ́ɛ́	tɛɛ	nɛ *	tin	sɔɔtʃàn c = [tʃ]	sɔɔʃwî sh = [ʃ]	ɲàŋ ñ= [ɲ]	bvùùkɛ	joofè y = [j]
Beboid	Nsari (Nsaari)	ŋk͡paŋ3	fɛː4	tɛː4	nɛː42	tiŋ42	bu3sɔː3	ɱfo2mɛ4ɲaːŋ2 (8 - 1)	ɲaːŋ2	ɱfo2mɛ4joː24fi42 (10 - 1)	joː24fi42
Ekoid	Ejagham	yə́t	éβáé	ésá	énî	érôn	èsáɡàsá (3 + 3)	èníɡìsá (4 + 3)	èníɡànî (4 + 4)	érôn énî (5 + 4)	ófó
Ekoid, Bakor	Ekajuk	njɛŋ	mbal	nra	nni	nlɔn	nrakera (3 + 3 ?)	eʃɛma	nɛkeni (4 + 4 ?)	eʃɛmʷubu (10 - 1?)	ewubu
Ekoid, Bakor	Nde-Ndele-Nta	n-dʒi	m-ba	n-sa	n-nɛ	n-dɔːn	asighasa (3 + 3 ?)	asimma	aneɡhane (4 + 4 ?)	asima-wobo (10 -1?)	wobo
Ekoid, Bakor	Nkem-Nkum (Nkim)	njirəng [ńjírə́ŋ]	ibal [íbâ]	ira [írá]	ini [ínî]	iro⃬n [írô̱n]	irara [ìrârà]	arimini [àrímī̱nî]	anigini [àníɡīnî]	arumiɡol [àrúmīɡôl]	iɡol [íɡôl]
Jarawan, Nigerian	Bada	ɗɪ́k	ɓâr	tàːt	jìːn	tʷàːn	tʷàŋsɔ̀lmʷák	kʲɛ́stàˑt (5 + 2)	kʲɛ́ʃìn (5 + 3)	kʲɛ́stʷàn (5 + 4)	lʊ̀m
Jarawan, Nigerian	Mbula-Bwazaa	mon / mwashat	rap	taru	ine	tonɡno	tonɡno war mwashat (5 + 1)	tonɡno war rap (5 + 2)	tonɡno war taru (5 + 3)	tonɡno war ine (5 + 4)	lum
Mamfe	Denya	ɡɛ́mâ	ópéá	ólɛ́	ónì	ótà	òkéné	òkénàmà (6 + 1)	ónè	ónēnàmà (8 + 1)	ófíà
Mamfe	Kenyang	ɛ́mɔ̂t	bɛpây	bɛ́rát	mɛ́nwî	bɛ́tây	bɛ́tándât (2 x 3) ? *	tándrámɔ̂t (6 + 1) ? **	mɛ́nɛ̀n	mɛ́nɛ̀n nɛ̀ àmɔ̀t (' 8 + 1 ')	byó
Mbe	Mbe	k. bɛ̀tép lètêl lé èjì bɛ́pʷâl lè bɛ̀tépbɛ́fwɔ̂r*	bɛ́pʷâl	bɛ́sá	bɛ́ñî	bɛ́tʃân	bɛ̀sêsár (3 + 3)	bɛ̀tânèbɛ́pʷâl (5 + 2)	bɛ̀ñîbɛ̀ñî (4 + 2)	bɛ́tânèbɛ́ñî (5 + 4)	bɛ́fwɔ̂r
