= Mvanip language =

Mambiloid language of Nigeria

Mvanip
- Mvano
- Magu
- Native to: Nigeria
- Region: Taraba State
- Native speakers: (100 cited 1999)
- Language family: Niger–Congo?: Atlantic–Congo; Benue–Congo; Mambiloid; Mambila–Konja; Mambila–Vute; Kamkam; Mvanip

Language codes
- ISO 639-3: mcj
- Glottolog: mvan1238
- ELP: Mvanip

Mvanip (Mvano), or Magu, is a minor Mambiloid language of Nigeria. Despite the small number of speakers, the use of the language use is vigorous. Ethnologue nevertheless classifies Mvanip as threatened.

== General information ==
As of 1964, Mvanip had 800 speakers in and around the town of Zongo Ajiya, which is located on the Mambila Plateau in Nigeria. By 1999, however, the language was only spoken by about 100 speakers. Despite this, all of the children of Mvanip speakers still speak the language, meaning that it is still alive. Fulfulde, Mambila, and Ndoro are also spoken in Zongo Ajiya.

Many confuse Mvanip with the Kaka language, which is spoken in southeastern Nigeria and the adjacent areas in Cameroon. Despite the confusion, these two languages are entirely unrelated.

The most closely related language is Ndunda, which is also spoken on the Mambila Plateau. Some other languages Mvanip is related to are Fam, Nizaa, Kwanja, Mambila, Vute and Wawa, which all evolved from proto-Mambiloid.

== Phonology ==
While not much information exists about the phonology of Mvanip itself, there is information about the phonology of its related languages.

For example, labialisation is used extensively in both Kwanja and Nizaa, two other Mambiloid Languages. Vowel merger in languages such as Mambila suggest that Mvanip most likely also has fewer vowels than their common ancestor, proto-Mambiloid. It is unclear whether any vowels or consonants are nasalised in Mvanip, as some of its relatives have nasalised sounds and some do not.

All Mambiloid languages seem to have very complex tonal systems. For example, Vute, Kwanja, Atta and Gembu Mambila all have a variety of level and glide tones that are incorporated into the speech. Mambiloid languages also have noun affix systems.
