= Fam language =

Bantoid language of Nigeria

Fam
- Koŋa, Kɔŋa, Konga
- Awol Fam
- Native to: Nigeria
- Region: Taraba State
- Native speakers: 500 (2016)
- Language family: Niger–Congo?: Atlantic–Congo; Volta-Congo; Benue–Congo; Bantoid; Fam

Language codes
- ISO 639-3: fam
- Glottolog: famm1241
- ELP: Fam
- Fam shown within Nigeria

Fam ([fám]) is an endangered Bantoid language, spoken by less than 500 in Bali LGA, Taraba State, Nigeria.

== Name ==
The speakers call themselves Fam, and their language either Fam or Awol Fam, although outsiders call the language Koŋa, Kɔŋa or Konga.

== Demographics ==
=== Speakers ===
In 2016, the language had less than 500 speakers.

Fam is recorded as having either 1000, or less than 1000 speakers in 1984. However, according to linguist Roger Blench, it did not have more than 500 speakers when it was recorded in 1984.

=== Area spoken ===
The language was previously thought to be spoken in the single village of Sabon Gida. However, according to later research, it is actually spoken in multiple villages.

== Documentation ==
A minimal grammar of the language was written by Tope Olagunjo Demilade in 2017.

== Classification ==
Fam is unclassified within the Bantoid family.

Blench (1993) classifies Fam as a Mambiloid language, within the Northern Bantoid family. It is classed there as likely related particularly to Ndoro, on the basis of a few cognates. Likewise, Dimmendaal and Voeltz (2007) classify it as a member of the Mambiloid group. However, Blench (2014) revises his former opinion, stating there is not enough data for a classification and that the claim of a relation to Ndoro is very weak. He concludes Fam is best treated as an isolated Bantoid language. Still, Blench (2020) lists it as a Mambiloid language, most closely related to Ndoro.

== Vocabulary ==
The wordlist in Blench (2014) lacks tone markers.

Many of the words have no clear etymology. There are cognates with Mambiloid languages, but this cannot be considered proof of a genetic connection as they are often with words that are isolated in Mambiloid languages. For example, "leopard" is asar in Fam and sɛre in Mvanip; this may be evidence of a shared substrate. Many words have a plural suffix -bə, resembling many Mambiloid languages but also many Dakoid languages.

In the phonology, there is evidence of contact with Jukun, but no good evidence for classification as a Jukunoid language. Note the prefix a- found in some plurals, like the Jukunoid languages; many singular nouns also seem to have this prefix. The phone /θ/ is present, characteristic of Jukunoid languages (but unusual for Mambiloid languages).

There are common words shared with Upper Cross River languages (e.g. "one" is wuni in Fam, wɔ̀ní in Gbo and wɔ̀nɔ́ in Mbembe), but again these are not considered proof of relation here.

The words for 'man' and 'women' both have suppletive-seeming plurals, a common West African areal feature.

English	Fam
man	yeyir (plural: ayɛrbo)
woman	yife (plural: yɛswɔp)
head	cɛl
face	ŋgir
nose	nwun
mouth	ŋwũ
tooth	ɲuŋ
tongue	álám
neck	acuŋ
arm, hand	vwa
leg	akwal
animal	iɲam gənə
meat	iɲam
horse	avun
cow, zebu	ane
fowl, chicken	àʧóò
goat	aʤwəl
sheep	dim θey
dog	aʒo
cat	akule
elephant	aθa
hippopotamus	aθa iɲum
buffalo, "bushcow"	iya
lion	awuyir
leopard	asar
hyena	abay
tortoise	ʧuwa kway
crocodile	ʒɛp
fish	aʒwey
bird	awun
egg	ʤinʤwo
yam	vuŋ
millet	gambal
sorghum	θi
okra	ʧum
old cocoyam	tuùŋ
sorrel, roselle	ʧwɔŋ
beans	sa
groundnut(s)	aθi wap
banana	agwe
tree	ʧi (plural: aʧi)
leaf	ra
locust tree	àlàm
sun	aŋgwo
moon, month	aʒɛr
sand	aθa
stone	tal (plural: atalbə)
water	ɲim kwe
fire	va
go (finally)	harə
come	kaŋbə
eat	ləra
drink	nuwunə
play (games)	mun
sing	yar
kill	val bəle
beat (drum), flog	za

=== Numbers ===
Fam numerals
English	Fam
one	wuni
two	baale
three	tawnə
four	daare
five	ʧwiine
six	ʧowuna (5+1)
seven	ʧipalə (5+2)
eight	twitawnə (5+3)
nine	ʧundaarə (5+4)
ten	kwoy
twenty	ɲiwunə
