= Bonte =

Bonte is a surname. Notable people with this surname include:

- Amy Bonté (born 1990), American rugby union player
- Barbara Bonte (born 1983), Belgian politician
- Bart Bonte, Belgian independent game developer
- Bert La Bonté, Australian actor
- Bob Bonte (1929–1988), Dutch swimmer
- Darren LaBonte (1974–2009), American officer and soldier
- Friedrich Bonte (1896–1940), German naval officer
- Florimond Bonte (1890–1977), French politician and journalist
- Hans Bonte (born 1962), Belgian politician
- John Harmon Charles Bonté (1831–1896), American lawyer and episcopal priest
- Marc de Bonte (1990–2016), Belgian kickboxer
- Paula Bonte (1840–1902), German landscape painter
- Robert LaBonte (born c. 1950), American curler
  - Curse of LaBonte

== See also ==
- Bont
- de Bont
- Hotel LaBonte
- Louis Bontes (born 1956), Dutch politician and former police officer
