= Nizaa language =

Mambiloid language, spoken in Cameroon

Nizaa
- Galim, Nyamnyam, Suga
- Nízɑɑ̀
- Pronunciation: [nɪ˦zʌː˧˨]
- Native to: Cameroon
- Region: Adamawa Region
- Ethnicity: Nizaa people
- Native speakers: (10,000 cited 1985)
- Language family: Niger–Congo?: Atlantic–Congo; Volta-Congo; Benue–Congo; Bantoid; Northern Bantoid?; Mambiloid; Nizaa
- Writing system: Latin

Language codes
- ISO 639-3: sgi
- Glottolog: suga1248
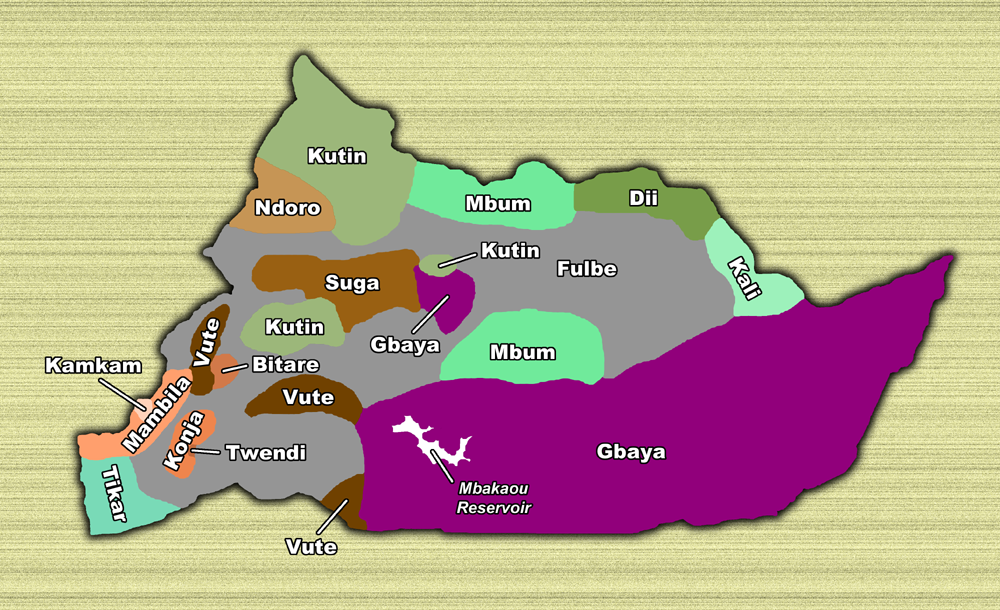
- Map of ethnic groups in Adamawa Region with "Suga" (slightly left of the centre) representing the Nizaa people and language

Nizaa (Nizaa pronunciation: [nɪ˦zʌː˧˨], practical orthography: Nízɑɑ̀), also known as Galim, Nyamnyam, and Suga, is an endangered Mambiloid language spoken in the Adamawa Region of northern Cameroon, by the Nizaa people. Most of the language's speakers live in and around the village of Galim in the department of Faro-et-Déo.

Nizaa has a complex sound system with 60 consonant phonemes, eleven tones, and a contrast between oral and nasal vowels. It is neither a head-initial nor head-final language (the head or main element of a clause does not prefer to come before or after its modifiers) and uses postpositions instead of prepositions (the adposition follows the noun it modifies).

Nizaa was first extensively documented in the 1980s by Norwegian linguists Rolf Theil Endresen and Bjørghild Kjelsvik. The language is endangered, but the exact number of active speakers is unknown since the last census of speakers took place in 1985.

== Name ==
Nizaa is also referred to as Suga (also spelled Ssuga), Galim, Nyamnyam (also spelled Nyemnyem, Njemnjem, and Jemjem), "Sewe" and "Mengaka". Nizaa is the word the Nizaa call themselves, while Suga comes from Pero súgò 'stranger' or 'not Pero'. 'Nyamnyam' is a pejorative term likely derived from the Fula word nyaamnyaamjo 'cannibal', which may also mean 'sorcerer', though there is no evidence the Nizaa have ever practised cannibalism or sorcery. Because another language exists in Adamawa Region also called "Nyamnyam", linguists have often confused the two languages. The name Galim comes from the main town of the Nizaa of the same name. Nizaa is referred to as "Mengaka" in the 1988 version of Ethnologue, but Endresen in 1991 did not recognise the name or know where it came from. "Sewe" may also be another alternate name for the language.

== Background ==
=== Demographics ===
Nizaa is primarily spoken in and around the village of Galim, located in Faro-et-Déo, in the Adamawa Region of northern Cameroon; the village has roughly 2,000 inhabitants. The most recent census of speakers was carried out in 1985 and reported 10,000 people actively speaking the language. However, the Atlas Linguistique du Cameroun (ALCAM) estimated only 2,000 speakers in 1983, so the actual number of speakers is unknown. The language is considered endangered.

Most Nizaa are not literate, and the few who are often only can read and write Fula in the Ajami Arabic script. The romanisation of Nizaa has not been widely adopted by the Nizaa people because of their low literacy rate. Several other languages are spoken in the region, and most Nizaa speakers are bilingual in Fula, specifically the Adamawa dialect, since it is essentially the lingua franca of northern Cameroon. Many also know Hausa, another regional language, or French, because it is one of the official languages of Cameroon.

=== Documentation ===
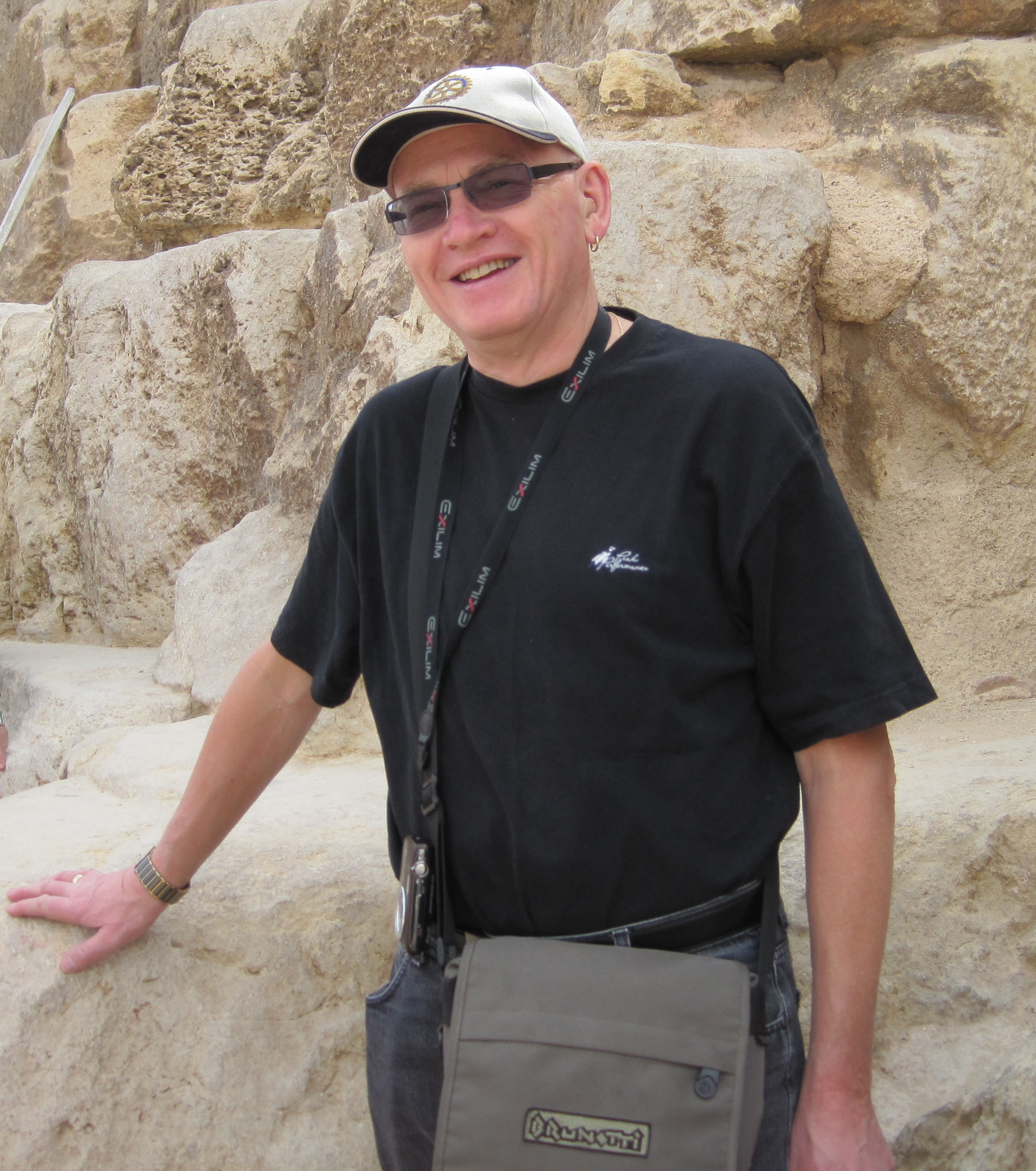
Rolf Theil, who was the first linguist to extensively document Nizaa

Initial documentation of Nizaa dates back to 1895, when linguist Carl Meinhof described the Mambiloid languages in his comparative survey of Cameroonian languages, Die Sprachverhältnisse in Kamerun. In 1910, German colonial officer and amateur ethnographer, Kurt Friedrich Strümpell, included a wordlist of the language in his work on the "pagan" languages of Adamawa, Wörterverzeichnis der Heidensprachen Adamauas. However, the language was first documented extensively by Norwegian linguist Rolf Theil at the University of Oslo, who published his findings in 1991. Theil devised the romanisation system of Nizaa and published the first analysis of the language, and he also supervised later research on Nizaa by his student, Bjørghild Kjelsvik. Kjelsvik began her work in the Nizaa community through the Evangelical Lutheran Church of Cameroon, which documented local languages in addition to engaging in evangelical conversion work.

== Classification ==
The exact classification of Nizaa is still in doubt. In 1983, ALCAM classified Nizaa and Kwanja as Mambiloid languages. Roger Blench in 1988 classified the Mambiloid languages, along with another language family in Nigeria's Adamawa State, the Dakoid languages, as members of the Northern Bantoid languages, which are a subdivision of the Bantoid language family.

However, another linguist, Bruce Connell, disagreed with this classification. In 1997, he suggested that the Mambiloid languages form a valid phylogenetic group (or the languages are each others' closest relatives), but also noted that Nizaa and Ndoro are highly divergent and can only be tenatively considered members of the Mambiloid languages. He also suggested that lexical and grammatical similarities within the Mambiloid languages are partly due to contact, not just shared ancestry, and that evidence of a phylogenetic relationship between the Mambiloid languages and the Dakoid languages is weak. Connell also suggested that the Mambiloid languages may either belong within the South Bantoid languages or may branch off independently from the Bantoid languages, separate from both the Dakoid languages and the South Bantoid languages.

== Phonology and orthography ==
=== Vowels ===
The Nizaa language has a contrast between oral and nasal vowels, with five short oral vowels, ten long oral vowels, and seven long nasal vowels. In Endresen's original romanisation, nasalised vowels were indicated by adding an ogonek, but Kjelsvik's revised romanisation indicates such vowels by adding ⟨ŋ⟩ after the vowel.

Older speakers of Nizaa also distinguish an eighth nasalised vowel /ɤ̃ː/ from /ʌ̃ː/, but this distinction has been lost in younger speakers.

Each of the five short oral vowels except /a/ can be pronounced in two different ways depending on the context, called allophones, that represent the same underlying vowel phoneme. Each allophone is part of one to two of three sets: the back set [ɯ, ʊ, ɤ, o], used when a vowel comes before /ɾ, g, ɰ̃/, except if the vowel follows /tʃ, dʒ, ᶮdʒ, ɲ, j, ʃ/ (e.g., sèr 'broom' is pronounced [sɤɾ˨] while cir 'poverty' is pronounced [tʃɯɾ˧]); the front set [ɪ, ʏ, e, ø], used when a vowel follows /tʃ, dʒ, ᶮdʒ, ɲ, j, ʃ/ and is before /n/ (e.g., còn 'wasp nest' is pronounced [tʃøn˨]); and the "normal" set [ɪ, ʊ, e, o], used everywhere else (e.g., ci 'to fall' is pronounced [tʃɪ˧]).

Nizaa vowels
	Short oral vowels		Long oral vowels				Long nasal vowels			
	Unrounded	Rounded	Front	Central	Back		Front	Central	Back	
	Unrounded	Rounded	Front	Central	unrounded	rounded	Front	Central	unrounded	rounded
Close	ɪ ~ ɯ ⟨i⟩	ʊ ~ ʏ ⟨u⟩	iː ⟨ii⟩	ɯː ⟨ʉʉ⟩		uː ⟨uu⟩	ĩː ⟨iiŋ⟩	ɯ̃ː ⟨ʉʉŋ⟩		ũː ⟨uuŋ⟩
Close-mid	e ~ ɤ ⟨e⟩	o ~ ø ⟨o⟩	eː ⟨ee⟩	ɤː ⟨əə⟩		oː ⟨oo⟩	ɛ̃ː ⟨ɛɛŋ⟩	(ɤ̃ː ⟨ααŋ⟩)		ɔ̃ː ⟨ɔɔŋ⟩
Open-mid	e ~ ɤ ⟨e⟩	o ~ ø ⟨o⟩	ɛː ⟨ɛɛ⟩	ʌː ⟨αα⟩		ɔː ⟨ɔɔ⟩	ɛ̃ː ⟨ɛɛŋ⟩	ʌ̃ː ⟨ααŋ⟩		ɔ̃ː ⟨ɔɔŋ⟩
Open	a ⟨a⟩		aː ⟨aa⟩				ãː ⟨aaŋ⟩			

=== Consonants ===
Nizaa has a complex consonantal inventory with 60 consonants, including five marginal phonemes, which occur infrequently in the language. In Nizaa, there are six main types of consonants: labial consonants, or consonants made with one or both lips; alveolar consonants, articulated with the tongue touching the alveolar ridge; post-alveolar consonants, articulated with the tongue behind the alveolar ridge; velar consonants, articulated with the tongue against the velum (the back part of the roof of the mouth); glottal consonants, articulated with the glottis (or the opening between the vocal folds); and labial–velar consonants, which are simultaneously articulated at the lips and velum.

Nizaa also has prenasalised consonants, which refer to sequences of nasal and non-nasal consonants that act like a single consonant, and implosive consonants, which refer to consonants articulated by both moving the glottis downward and expelling air from the lungs. Both types of consonants are common in the languages of Sub-Saharan Africa.

The consonants in parentheses are marginal: the labial flap /ⱱ̟ ~ ⱱ/ is only found in ideophones, words that evoke a certain sound, and the voiced velar fricative /ɣ/ is only found between vowels to distinguish compounds from disyllabic words. The two glottal stops /ʔ/ and /ʔʷ/ are also marginal and are not written in the modern orthography, although Endresen's old orthography used an apostrophe ⟨ʼ⟩ and an apostrophe followed by 'w' ⟨ʼw⟩ to represent /ʔ/ and /ʔʷ/ respectively. They are only found in interjections (e.g., íŋìŋ /ʔɯɰ̃˦ʔɯɰ̃˨/ 'no'), loanwords from Arabic (e.g., Nizaa alad /ʔa˧lad˧/ 'Sunday', from Arabic: الأحد, romanised: al-ʾaḥad /alʔaħad/, loaned via Fula 'alat /ʔalat/), and variants of the third-person plural pronouns (e.g., wáá [ʔʷaː˦] 'they', when combined with a to-be or auxiliary verb). /x/ is only distinguished from /h/ in one word root, and consequently, shares the same letter as /h/ in the orthography.

When before the rounded vowels /ʊ ~ ʏ, o ~ ø, uː, oː, ɔː, ũː, ɔ̃ː/, the consonants /p, b, ᵐb, f, v, ᶬv, k͡p, ɡ͡b, ᵑ͡ᵐɡ͡b, h/ become labialised [pʷ, bʷ, ᵐbʷ, fʷ, vʷ, ᶬvʷ, k͡pʷ, ɡ͡bʷ, ᵑ͡ᵐɡ͡bʷ, hʷ] (e.g., mbombóó 'candy', from French bonbon, is pronounced [ᵐbʷo˧ᵐbʷoː˦]).

The distinction between /s/ and /ʃ/, and between /sʷ/ and /ʃʷ/ is uncertain. Minimal pairs, pairs of words that differ by only one sound, do exist between these sounds (e.g., saw 'to cross' and shaw 'to tremble'), but in many words, both /s(ʷ)/ and /ʃ(ʷ)/ can be used interchangeably without changing meaning (e.g., sùú and shùú both mean 'god').

Nizaa consonants
		Labial		Alveolar		Post- alveolar		Velar		Labial– velar	Glottal	
		plain	lab.	plain	lab.	plain	lab.	plain	lab.	Labial– velar	plain	lab.
Plosive/ Affricate	voiceless	p ⟨p⟩		t ⟨t⟩	tʷ ⟨tw⟩	tʃ ⟨c⟩	tʃʷ ⟨cw⟩	k ⟨k⟩	kʷ ⟨kw⟩	k͡p ⟨kp⟩	(ʔ)	(ʔʷ)
Plosive/ Affricate	voiced	b ⟨b⟩		d ⟨d⟩	dʷ ⟨dw⟩	dʒ ⟨j⟩	dʒʷ ⟨jw⟩	ɡ ⟨g⟩	ɡʷ ⟨gw⟩	ɡ͡b ⟨gb⟩	(ʔ)	(ʔʷ)
Plosive/ Affricate	prenasalised	ᵐb ⟨mb⟩		ⁿd ⟨nd⟩	ⁿdʷ ⟨ndw⟩	ᶮdʒ ⟨nj⟩	ᶮdʒʷ ⟨njw⟩	ᵑɡ ⟨ŋg⟩	ᵑɡʷ ⟨ŋgw⟩	ᵑ͡ᵐɡ͡b ⟨mgb⟩	(ʔ)	(ʔʷ)
Plosive/ Affricate	implosive	ɓ ⟨ɓ⟩	ɓʷ ⟨ɓw⟩	ɗ ⟨ɗ⟩	ɗʷ ⟨ɗw⟩						(ʔ)	(ʔʷ)
Plosive/ Affricate	prenasalised implosive	ᵐɓ ⟨mɓ⟩		ⁿɗ ⟨nɗ⟩	ⁿɗʷ ⟨nɗw⟩						(ʔ)	(ʔʷ)
Nasal		m ⟨m⟩	mʷ ⟨mw⟩	n ⟨n⟩	nʷ ⟨nw⟩	ɲ ⟨ny⟩	ɲʷ ⟨nyw⟩					
Approximant	voiced			l ⟨l⟩	lʷ ⟨lw⟩	j ⟨y⟩	ɥ ⟨yw⟩			w ⟨w⟩		
Approximant	nasalised							ɰ̃ ⟨ŋ⟩		w̃ ⟨ŋw⟩		
Fricative	voiceless	f ⟨f⟩		s ⟨s⟩	sʷ ⟨sw⟩	ʃ ⟨sh⟩	ʃʷ ⟨shw⟩	(x ⟨h⟩)			h ⟨h⟩	
Fricative	voiced	v ⟨v⟩		z ⟨z⟩	zʷ ⟨zw⟩			(ɣ ⟨gh⟩)				
Fricative	prenasalised	ᶬv ⟨mv⟩		ⁿz ⟨nz⟩								
Tap/Flap		(ⱱ̟ ~ ⱱ ⟨vb⟩)		ɾ ⟨r⟩	ɾʷ ⟨rw⟩							

=== Syllable structure ===
Nizaa has three permissible syllable types: CV (e.g., ge 'to go'), CVV (e.g., sìì 'house'), and CVC, (e.g., yîm 'medicine') where C represents a consonant, V a short vowel, and VV a long vowel (which may be nasalised or not). The syllable structure V (a single short vowel) exists only in the particle a, which has various meanings based on the tone used; these include the copula or "to-be verb" á, which takes a high tone. CV and V syllables are monomoraic, while CVV and CVC syllables are bimoraic and take twice the amount of time as monomoraic syllables to fully articulate. Monosyllabic nouns can only have the syllable structures CVV and CVC, while monosyllabic verbs can have all allowed syllable structures (CV, CVV, CVC).

Nizaa only permits certain consonants to act as codas, or consonants that end a syllable; these are /p, b, t, d, k, g, m, n, ɰ̃, w, w̃, j, ɾ/. The consonants /d/ and /j/ are fairly marginal as codas, with /d/ only being found in loanwords from Fula and Arabic (e.g., pád 'everything, all' from Fula pat), and in some indigenous words (e.g., dutàd 'Rüppel's vulture'). /j/ is only found in the word sèy, the imperative form (used for commands) of the verb se 'to see or perceive', and in interjections and ideophones (e.g., kây 'no') in all dialects of Nizaa. However, in the Galim dialect of Nizaa, /j/ as a coda is found in more words and is not marginal (e.g., swěȳ 'flour made of roasted corn and peanuts' in the Galim dialect is swěe in other dialects, and shey 'a taboo or forbidden word' in the Galim dialect is shee in other dialects). In 1991, Endresen also listed another marginal coda /j̃/, but in 2002, Kjelsvik re-analysed the only word it was known to occur in as /jĩː/.

=== Tonology ===
Nizaa is a tonal language. Tonal languages use shifts in the pitch of syllables to differentiate words from each other, independently from pragmatic considerations. Such languages are common across Sub-Saharan Africa.

Nizaa has three phonemic tone levels: high, mid, and low, as well as a number of two- and three-tone tone contours (combinations of tones within a syllable), which are indicated in the orthography using a variety of diacritical marks. (Note: Kjelsvik represents three-tone contours by combining multiple diacritics on a single vowel, since very few diacritics exist for three-tone contours. The diacritics are written sequentially rather than stacked, so that the order of the tone contour is clear, although this may create collisions. For CVC syllables, she sometimes places diacritics on the coda not because the coda carries tone, but to prevent as many collisions of diacritics as possible.) Verb roots can only use the high or mid tones, unlike nouns, which may use any of the three levels. Tones regularly participate in grammatical processes.

Representation of tones in the orthography
Tone	Chao tone letter	CV	CVV	CVC
H / H° / ꜜH	˦	tá	táá	tám
M / M°	˧	ta	taa	tam
L / L°	˨	tà	tàà	tàm
LH	˨˦	tǎ	tàá	tǎm
HM	˦˧	ta᷇	táa	ta᷇m
HL	˦˨	tâ	táà	tâm
MH	˧˦	ta᷄	taá	ta᷄m
ML	˧˨	ta᷆	taà	ta᷆m
LHM	˨˦˧	tǎˉ	tǎa	tǎm̄
LHL	˨˦˨	ta᷈	tǎà	tǎm̀
MHL	˧˦˨	ta᫘	ta᷄à	ta᷄m̀

Endresen groups the tones into "primary tones" and "secondary tones". The primary tones, high (H), mid (M), low (L), and rising (LH), are found on all types of syllables (CV, CVV, and CVC). The "secondary tones", which include falling (HM, HL, and ML), rising (MH) and peaking (LHM) tones, are found on word-final syllables and can be understood as one of the primary tones plus an additional tone, though MH and ML tones can be found on non-final syllables in the augumentative and diminutive forms of words. Kjelsvik, in 2002, recognised two more peaking tones, MHL and LHL.

Nizaa has floating high tones, which are high tones that are not attached to a specific syllable. They are written with a small circle (°), e.g., M° or L°. Before a pause, floating tones are not realised, so oppositions such as M versus M° or L versus L° are neutralised (e.g., ŋun 'boy/girl', with a tone of M, and ɓʉʉ, with a tone of M° are articulated with the same tone). However, before another word, floating tones surface as a high tone on the preceding syllable (e.g., ŋun mum 'one boy/girl' retains its mid tone, while in ɓʉʉ́ mum 'one head', ɓʉʉ́ is a rising tone MH). As a result, floating tones expand the inventory of possible tonal realisations by combining with other tones, although some combinations of tones collapse and merge with other tone combinations.

A tone at the end of a syllable can shift to the following syllable. When the shifted tone is mid and the following syllable also carries mid tone, there is no change (e.g., when words ɓɔ̌ɔŋ 'egg' and mum 'one' are placed one after the other, the mid tone in LHM tone sequence of ɓɔ̌ɔŋ merges with the mid tone in mum, creating the sequence ɓɔ̀ɔ́ŋ mum). However, when the shifted tone is high, the shift is audible (e.g., when gòŋ 'elephant', which has a L° tone, is before the word ɓaara 'two', the floating high tone moves, creating the sequence gòŋ ɓáara 'two elephants'). Tone shift also interacts with suffixation: when a final L is added to mark the definite form of a noun (e.g., 'the house' versus 'house'), some peaking tones simplify to LHM.

Nizaa also exhibits downstep (ꜜH), which is a high tone realised lower than the preceding high tone but higher than a mid tone. Downstep arises when a sequence like MH is reinterpreted as ꜜH after tone shift (e.g., in the word ɓóbcún 'large dog', the augmentative of ɓo᷇w 'dog', the mid tone in the falling HM tone shifts to the following suffix cún and this MH sequence becomes a downstep ꜜH).

=== Morphophonology ===
In some types of suffixes, including some irregular noun plurals, the root vowel lowers to /a/ in Nizaa. Coda consonants in word-final syllables change in the imperfective aspect: syllables ending in /b/ instead end with /w/; syllables ending in /w̃/ end with /m/; syllables ending in /n/ nasalise the preceding vowel; syllables ending in /g/ end in a high tone and raise the vowel (i.e. /a/ to /ʌ́/); and syllables ending in nasal vowels raise and lengthen the preceding vowel. However, when the coda augmentative suffix is appended to a word with a weakened final consonant, the final consonant fortifies back to its "strong" form.

== Grammar ==
=== Word order ===
Nizaa generally uses subject–verb–object (SVO) word order and is neither strongly head-initial nor strongly head-final (in the English phrase eat an apple, the verb and head of the verb phrase eat precedes its complements, making English head-initial). In noun phrases, some nouns are head-initial while others are head-final. (Note: A statistical survey of 201 noun–noun compounds found about 111 left-headed (head-initial) and 79 right-headed (head-final) compounds, so there is only a slight preference for left-headedness in Nizaa. Left-headed compounds tend to involve location, purpose, resemblance, identical, and state relations, while right-headed compounds involve attributive relations such as part-whole, kinship, and possession.) Relative clauses carry no overt grammatical marking and are head-initial, because they follow the noun they modify. The language primarily uses postpositions which follow their object, which is another head-initial aspect of the language. However, there is evidence of at least one preposition (the comitative, which denotes accompaniment). The possessor always precedes the possessee and most adjectives, demonstratives, and numerals also precede the noun they modify, head-final aspects of the language. Kjelsvik lists the following examples of Nizaa noun constructions in her 2002 thesis:

Possessive phrase:

kùù fɔ́ɔ̀
grandpa staff
'grandpa's staff'

Noun and adjective:

nyánì nízαὰ
language Nizaa
'the Nizaa language'

Noun and demonstrative:

nìì làw
person DEM
'this/that person'

Compound noun:

sìì yîm
house medicine
'hospital'

Relative clause:

nìì nwààŋ njèwa᷆ fà díwure᷇
person fight tires NEG come-PRF.DETR
'a person who does not tire of fighting, has come'

Prepositional phrase (comitative):

wú wa᷆n
COM chief
'with the chief'

Postpositional phrase:

wûr ndiŋ
field in
'in the field'

Locative:

cún ɓirâ
tree head-LOC
'in the tree top'

=== Nouns and pronouns ===
Definiteness on nouns is marked by adding a lowering tone contour. The marking for plurals depends on the animacy of the noun: when the noun is animate, i.e. refers to a human or an animal, the suffix -wu is added, and when the noun is inanimate, another suffix -ya is added. The word ɓaara 'two' may also be used to represent plurality. No case-marking exists in Nizaa, with the possible exception of the locative, which marks location, although this may be a clitic instead because it may behave more like a word-like element that cannot stand on its own in speech and must attach to a neighbouring word for pronunciation. Kjelsvik lists the following examples of noun morphology (forms of nouns):

	Singular (e.g 'a house')	Singular definite (e.g., 'the house')	Plural (e.g., 'houses')
Regular nouns	sìì	sìì	sìì ɓaara
Regular nouns	cún	cûn	cún ɓaara
Regular nouns	njèè	njèê	njèèyâ
Irregular nouns	nìì	nìì	náw
Irregular nouns	mbíram	mbíra᷄m̀	mbírarı᷇
Irregular nouns	yéŋw	yêŋw	yáŋw

Pronouns have three forms: their isolated versions, the versions when combined with the copula á and their versions in context (i.e. in a sentence with a finite noun). Some pronouns in Nizaa have different honorific forms to show respect, different logophoric forms to refer to someone speaking or being spoken about, or different vocative forms to address someone directly. Pronouns have singular and plural forms. The third-person plural pronoun in context has three forms, the older form ɓu, a newer form u (pronounced with an initial glottal stop, [ʔʊ˧]), and a long form ɓúsúúŋwu. The third person plural pronoun form with copula two forms as well: the older form ɓwáá, and a newer form with a glottal stop wáá [ʔʷaː˦]. Kjelsvik lists the following examples of pronouns:

		Isolated form	Form with copula	Context form	Vocative	Honorific
Singular	1st	mi	máá	mi	N/A	N/A
Singular	2nd	wi	wáá	wu	N/A	N/A
Singular	3rd	ŋwi	ŋwáá	ŋwu	N/A	nùro
Singular	Logophoric	N/A		yí	N/A	N/A
Plural	1st	yí	yáá	yí	N/A	N/A
Plural	2nd	nywí	nywáá	nywú	ɗiwu	N/A
Plural	3rd	ɓwi	ɓwáá (wáá)	ɓu (ɓúsúúŋwu, u)	N/A	nàro
Plural	Logophoric	N/A		yíwú	N/A	N/A

=== Verbs ===
Nizaa verb roots are monosyllabic, and always have a mid or high tone, but extra elements can be added to change the original meaning of the verb or for grammatical purposes. These suffixes include a "habitual/imperfective" -cì, signifying a repeated action; a "perfective/stative" -wu᷄, signifying a completed action or a current state of being; and two additional perfect tenses. (Note: The two perfects are a "perfect intransitive" -ra᷇, which blocks the addition of any further verb arguments without changing the number of arguments a verb has; and a "perfect transitive" rí, which is used when any additional arguments are present in a sentence.) Progressive (indicating an ongoing action) -ri and imperative (indicating a demand, marked with a low tone) suffixes also exist, as well as suffixes negating the original verb. There is also a "detransitivizer" suffix, -re᷇, that demotes the direct object of a verb to an oblique argument or removes it altogether. Many suffixes, like the imperative, have negative counterparts. For example, the perfective/stative's negative counterpart is -ŋwa.

In addition to these verb tense suffixes, Kjelsvik also describes several verb number indicators and a variety of suffixes indicating location. For example, four directional suffixes, which serve to identify the path of motion verbs, have been described by Kjelsvik. These are the illative -a, which indicates "motion into an enclosure"; the allative -ri, indicating "motion towards a location"; the distinctive -wa, indicating "motion away from a location"; and the sublative suffix -sa, indicating "motion towards a lower location".

Nizaa permits strings of verbal suffixes. A stacking of up to three suffixes to a single verb is grammatical in Nizaa, and up to four verbs may occur in one sentence in Nizaa. Kjelsvik lists the following examples of Nizaa verb constructions:

ge kwɛɛ jʉʉŋ ŋu mάάŋ
go find return 3SG friend
'He went and found his friend again.'

à yí seghə́ə́ gè nyin ni càŋw
AUX LOG {mother-in-law} go speak give again
'... so that (it) will go to greet my mother-in-law.'

mbéw ɗàà kǔm bαά tαάŋ yɛɛ jíwcí ŋú cún yɛ̀ɛ̀ kona᷆ a᷆ nǎm̀ di kwɛɛkìwí
monkey other while seek eat change roam-PRES 3SG tree fruit bush-LOC COP hyena-DEF come find-TOT-PST
'A monkey who just then was roaming about seeking and eating his tree nuts in the bush, came and found the hyena.'

== Vocabulary ==
=== Kinship system ===
The Nizaa language has an Iroquois kinship system; that is, it uses the same word maaŋ for both mothers and maternal aunts, and the same word táá for both fathers and paternal uncles. However, it has different words for maternal uncles and paternal aunts, distinguishing them from the other relatives. The Nizaa language does not distinguish maternal and paternal grandparents either. Separate terms exist for older sisters and brothers, but there is no distinction of sex for younger siblings. The terms for 'older sister' díí and 'older brother' daà are also used as generic terms for polite address, while addressing someone as a 'younger sibling' na᷇m is seen as disrespectful regardless of gender. The words for cousins are the same as the ones for siblings and also depend on age. A generic term for in-laws, jwììŋ, also exists.

== Sample text ==
Kjelsvik gives a sample sentence in Nizaa:

{ŋu wààwu} se kekira᷇, ɓulαὰŋ sewu mbân kùù fɔ́ɔ̀ ɗag gewunâ, yɛ́ɛ́wú-ŋwa᷄ kùù kpááŋ nìwà.
{3SG grandchild-PL} see know-TOT-PRF.DETR they.3PL-these.DEM.PROX see-PST place grandpa staff-DF fall go-PST-PCPL will-STAT-NEG grandpa talk give-SUB
'His grandchildren have seen and know, they saw the place grandpa's staff went and fell into, they do not want to tell him.'

== See also ==
- Languages of Cameroon
- Adamawa languages
- Mambila language
- Vute language
