= Sugah (disambiguation) =

Sugah is the name of a village in Iran.

Sugah may also refer to:

- "Sugah", a song by Ruby Amanfu
- "Sugah", a term of endearment often used by the X-Men character Rogue
  - Sugah, the X-Babies version of Rogue
- Sugah, one of the groups in music collective Swing Mob

== See also ==
- Suga (disambiguation)
- Sugar (disambiguation)
- Suka (disambiguation)
- Shuga (disambiguation)
