= Yeni language =

Extinct Mambiloid language of Cameroon

Yeni
- Region: Cameroon
- Extinct: 20th century
- Language family: Niger–Congo?: Atlantic–Congo; Benue–Congo; Mambiloid; Mambila-Konja ?; Yeni

Language codes
- ISO 639-3: yei
- Glottolog: yeni1253

The Yeni language is an extinct language of Cameroon, formerly spoken around Djeni Mountain in the Nyalang area. All that remains of the language, apparently, is a song remembered by some Sandani speakers. However, according to Bruce Connell (the first linguist to report its existence, in 1995), comparison of the song's words to neighboring languages suggests that "it was closely related to [the Mambiloid languages] Cambap, Njerep, and Kasabe."

== Bibliography ==
- Connell, B. (1995). Dying Languages and the Complexity of the Mambiloid Group. Paper presented at the 25th Colloquium on African Languages and Linguistics, Leiden.
