= Bung language =

Endangered language of Cameroon

Bung
- Native to: Cameroon
- Region: Adamawa Province
- Extinct: 1970s
- Language family: Niger–Congo?: Atlantic–Congo; Benue–Congo?; Mambiloid?; Bung

Language codes
- ISO 639-3: bqd
- Glottolog: bung1259
- ELP: Bung

The Bung language is a moribund language of Cameroon remembered by three people in 1995 at the village of Boung on the Adamawa Plateau. It is remembered best by one speaker who learned the language at a young age, though it is not his mother tongue. A wordlist shows its strongest resemblance to be with the Ndung dialect of the Mambiloid language Kwanja, although that may simply be because this has become the dominant language of the village where the last speakers reside. It also has words in common with other Mambiloid languages such as Tep, Somyev and Vute, while a number of words' origins remain unclear (possibly Adamawan). For lack of data, it is not definitively classified.
