= Sugar (disambiguation) =

Sugar is a class of edible substances.

Sugar may also refer to:

== Places ==
- Sugar Creek (disambiguation), various waterways in the US
- Sugar Island (disambiguation), various islands in North America
- Sugar Mountain (North Carolina)
- Sugar River (disambiguation), various rivers in the US

== People ==
=== Given name ===
- Sugar Mercado (born 1986), Filipina dancer and actress

=== Nickname ===
- Sugar Cain (1907–1975), Major League Baseball pitcher
- Rashad Evans (born 1979), American mixed martial artist nicknamed "Sugar"
- Jessica Kiper (born 1979), Survivor contestant, nicknamed "Sugar"
- Sugar Ray Leonard (born 1956), American boxer
- Sugar Ray Marimón (born 1988), Major League Baseball pitcher from Colombia
- Sugar Minott (1956–2010), Jamaican reggae singer, producer
- Shane Mosley (born 1971), American boxer nicknamed "Sugar"
- Sugar Blue (James Whiting, born 1950), American blues harmonica player
- Sugar Ramos (1941–2017), Cuban-Mexican boxer
- Sugar Ray Richardson or Micheal Ray Richardson (1955–2025), American basketball player and head coach
- Sugar Chile Robinson (born 1938), American blues and boogie child prodigy pianist
- Sugar Ray Robinson (1921–1989), American boxer
- Sugar Ray Seales (born 1952), U.S. Virgin Islands-born American boxer

=== Stage name or ring name ===
- Sugar Lyn Beard (born 1981), Canadian actress, stage name "Sugar"
- Sugar, a female professional wrestler from the Gorgeous Ladies of Wrestling
- Cooper Coyle, American drag queen, known by the stage name "Sugar"

=== Surname ===
- Sugár, a Hungarian-language surname, of different etymology
- Alan Sugar (born 1947), English entrepreneur and TV personality
- Bert Sugar (1937–2012), American boxing writer and sports historian
- Leo Sugar (1927–2020), American football player
- Maurice Sugar (1891–1974), American political activist and labor attorney
- Rebecca Sugar (born 1987), American animator, composer and director
- Ronald Sugar (born 1948), American businessman, former chairman of the board, and chief executive officer of Northrop Grumman Corporation

== Arts, entertainment, and media ==
=== Fictional characters ===
- Sugar, the titular character in A Little Snow Fairy Sugar
- Sugar, a Batman Forever character
- Sugar, one of the protagonists of Sugar and Spike, a DC Comics comic book series (1956–1971)
- Sugar, from Total Drama All-Stars and Pahkitew Island
- John Sugar, the lead character in the TV series Sugar, portrayed by Colin Farrell
- Sugar "Kane" Kowalczyk, a principal character in the 1959 film Some Like It Hot, played by Marilyn Monroe
- Sugar Motta, in the TV series Glee
- Natalie "Sugar" Berzatto, in the TV series The Bear

=== Films ===
- Sugar (2004 film), a Canadian romantic drama
- Sugar (2008 film), an American baseball drama
- Sugar (2013 film), an American drama
- Sugar (2019 film), a Ghanaian musical romantic comedy
- Sugar (2022 film), a Canadian Mexican crime drama

=== Music ===
==== Groups ====
- Sugar (American band), an alternative rock band of the 1990s
- Sugar (South Korean group), active 2001–2006
- The two female vocalists in Dave & Sugar, a country music trio
- Sugar (trio), a Japanese vocal group of the 1980s

==== Labels ====
- Sugar Music, an Italian record label

==== Albums ====
- Sugar (15& album), 2014
- Sugar (Aloha album), 2002
- Sugar (Claw Boys Claw album), 1992
- Sugar (Choi Young-jae EP), 2022
- Sugar (Dead Confederate album), 2010
- Sugar (Etta Jones album), 1979
- Sugar (Leon Redbone album), 1990
- Sugar (Robin Schulz album), 2015
- Sugar (Stanley Turrentine album), 1971
- Sugar (Tokio album), 2008
- Sugar (Tonic album), 1999
- Sugar, by Nancy Sinatra, 1967

==== Songs ====
- "Sugar" (Armand Van Helden song), 2005
- "Sugar" (Editors song), 2013
- "Sugar" (Flo Rida song), 2009
- "Sugar" (Ladytron song), 2005
- "Sugar" (Maroon 5 song), 2014
- "Sugar" (My Bloody Valentine song), 1989
- "Sugar" (Peking Duk and Jack River song), 2019
- "Sugar" (Robin Schulz song), 2015
- "Sugar" (Brockhampton song), 2020
- "Sugar" (System of a Down song), 1998
- "Sugar" (Natalia Gordienko song), 2021
- "Sugar: That Sugar Baby O'Mine", 1926
- "Sugar (Gimme Some)", by Trick Daddy featuring Ludacris, Lil' Kim, and Cee-Lo Green, 2004
- "Sugar", by Aaron Carter from Another Earthquake!, 2002
- "Sugar", by All Time Low from Everyone's Talking!, 2025
- "Sugar", by Bikini Kill from Pussy Whipped, 1993
- "Sugar", by Garbage from Not Your Kind of People, 2012
- "Sugar", by Heather Nova from Oyster, 1994
- "Sugar", by Karmin from Leo Rising, 2016
- "Sugar", by Lenny Kravitz from Are You Gonna Go My Way, 1993
- "Sugar", by Leona Lewis from Glassheart, 2012
- "Sugar", by Simple Minds from Cry, 2002
- "Sugar", by SG Lewis and Shygirl, 2025
- "Sugar", by Sofia Carson from Sofia Carson, 2022
- "Sugar", by Stevie Wonder from Signed, Sealed & Delivered, 1970
- "Sugar", by Tiny Lights from Stop the Sun, I Want to Go Home, 1992
- "Sugar", by Tori Amos from To Venus and Back, 1999
  - This song is also the b-side from her single China, 1992

=== Television ===
- Sugar (Canadian TV series), a 2002–2007 Canadian cooking show
- Sugar (2018 TV series), an American reality series by Adam Levine
- Sugar (2024 TV series), an American drama series

=== Other arts, entertainment, and media ===
- Sugar (musical), 1972
- Sugar, half of the duo Milk & Sugar, German house music producers and record label owners
- sugarscape.com, a former girls teen magazine

== Computing ==
- Sugar (desktop environment), an open source desktop environment for children
- SugarCRM, a company providing customer relationship management (CRM) software
- Syntactic sugar, syntactical elements of a computer language added primarily for convenience

== Other uses ==
- Sugar Bowl, an annual American college football bowl game

== See also ==
- Sucrose, common table sugar
- Sugar City (disambiguation)
- Sugar, Sugar (disambiguation)
- Big Sugar, a nickname of Matt Cain (born 1984), American retired Major League Baseball pitcher
- Sugaring (epilation), a method of hair removal
- Sugarland (disambiguation)
- Suger, a French abbot
- Sugaar, a Basque deity
