= Njerep language =

Mambiloid language of Nigeria

Njerep
- Njerup
- Native to: Cameroon
- Region: Adamawa Region, Cameroon
- Ethnicity: Njerep people
- Native speakers: (4 cited 2000)
- Language family: Niger–Congo?: Atlantic–Congo; Benue–Congo; Mambiloid; Mambila–Konja; Njerep

Language codes
- ISO 639-3: njr
- Glottolog: njer1242
- ELP: Njerep
- Njerep is classified as Critically Endangered by the UNESCO Atlas of the World's Languages in Danger

Njerep (Njerup) is a Mambiloid language spoken in the Adamawa Region of Cameroon. Njerep is almost completely extinct, with only 4 people who speak it (as of 2000). Though word lists and grammatical information have been collected from these people, the information remains fragmented.

== Endangerment ==
Njerep is considered a critically endangered language under the UNESCO language endangerment index. Research conducted in 2000 indicates that only six speakers of this language remain, all of whom reside in the Somié village located along the Nigeria-Cameroon border (6°28' N, 11° 27' E). Of these six speakers, only one remains conversant in the language. The others have been reported to be semi-speakers. The youngest of the speakers was born in the 1940s, and it is unlikely that Njerep will be able to survive past the current generation. Njerep is no longer a language of casual conversation. Instead, it is most often used for maintaining secrecy from non-speakers in conversation.

According to a study in 2007, only four people spoke this language. All of them were elderly. The Mambila language, also known as Mvop, has instead supplanted Njerep in casual use.

== History of Njerep people ==
Though the Njerep people currently reside in Somié village, it is widely understood that the Njerep immigrated to that location from the mountains. Geographically, Somié village is located on the Tikar Plain of Cameroon. The approximately 2,500 inhabitants of Somié are not only Njerep, but also a wide variety of immigrant groups including the Liap, Ndeba, and Mvup people. Though oral accounts of how these groups immigrated to the Tikar plain are often contradictory, it appears that three or four waves of immigration led to the population of this area. It is likely that the Njerep people immigrated to the Tikar Plain from some region of the Adamawa Plateau, possibly from the Djeni Mountain (also shown as Jiini or Aigue Mboundo on some maps) on the Mambilla Plateau. Njerep is a variant of Nzirrip, formerly located at Nyo Heights of the Mambilla Plateau. It is today represented by the remnant village of Yanzirri. It is obvious that their ultimate origin is traceable to the Mambilla Plateau from where they accessed the lowlying Nyalang Highlands through the Jiini Mountain range.

== Classification ==
Njerep appears to be related to the extinct Kasabe (Luo), the extinct Yeni, and the endangered Twendi. Njerep appears to have been mutually intelligible with Kasabe, though not with Twendi.

Njerep falls under the broad classification of one of the Mambiloid languages. Mambila, the largest language in the Mambiloid grouping, has approximately twenty different dialects, loosely divided into East Mambila and West Mambila dialect clusters. Linguistic analysis suggests that Njerep may fall under the East Mambila cluster. However, it remains contested whether or not Njerep and its related languages should comprise its own unique grouping.

== Recording ==
Intense efforts to record and characterize Njerep began in 2000. However, by the year 2000, Njerep had already been in terminal decline for some time. Thus, knowledge of Njerep vocabularies and grammars remains quite fragmentary. Unfortunately, the lack of fluent speakers makes it unlikely that the incomplete record will ever be significantly amended. A comprehensive guide to Njerep vocabulary and grammar has been published and is freely available.
