= Suga (disambiguation) =

Suga (born 1993) is a South Korean rapper, songwriter, and record producer, as well as a member of boy band BTS.

Suga may also refer to:

- Suga, Iran, a village in Qazvin Province, Iran
- Suga language, a language of Cameroon
- Suga (EP), 2020 EP by Megan Thee Stallion
- Suga, 1996 album by female hip hop duo Terri & Monica, or the title track
- "Suga", a song by Monica from her 2015 album Code Red
- Sean O'Malley (fighter), nicknamed "Suga"
- Nizaa language, also known as Suga

== People with the surname ==
- Daiki Suga (born 1988), Japanese football forward
- Hiroaki Suga (born 1963), Japanese chemist
- Hiroe Suga (born 1963), Japanese writer
- Hirofumi Suga (comedian) (born 1976), Japanese comedian
- Hirofumi Suga (garden designer), Japanese garden designer and landscape architect
- Hiroshi Suga (born 1945), Japanese photographer
- Kantarō Suga (1934–1994), Japanese actor
- Kenta Suga (born 1994), Japanese actor
- Kishio Suga (born 1944), Japanese sculptor and installation artist
- Nobuo Suga (born 1933), Japanese biologist
- Shikao Suga (born 1966), Japanese musician and singer-songwriter
- Shōtarō Suga (1977–2015), Japanese screenwriter
- Takamasa Suga (born 1977), Japanese actor
- Tatsuji Suga (1885–1945), Japanese military commander
- Toshiro Suga (born 1950), Japanese aikido instructor
- Yoshihide Suga (born 1948), Japanese politician and former Prime Minister of Japan
- Yoshima Suga (菅 芳松; born 1947), Japanese sport wrestler

== See also ==
- Sugar Sugar (disambiguation)
- Suga Pop, American street dance practitioner
- "Suga Suga", a 2003 song by American rapper Baby Bash and Mexican-American singer Frankie J
- Suga Suga (film), a 2021 Nigerian romantic comedy film
- Sugababes, an English pop girl group
- Takako Shimazu (born 1939), former member of the Imperial House of Japan who was known as Takako, Princess Suga prior to her marriage
