= Sugár =

Sugár is a Hungarian-language surname literally meaning "light ray". Notable people with this surname include:

- Gyula Sugár (1924–1991), Hungarian painter
- Károly Sugár (1882–1936), Hungarian actor
- Lajos Sugár (1893–1974), Hungarian actor.
- Miklós Sugár (born 1952), Hungarian conductor, music educator, and composer
- Rezső Sugár (1919–1988), Hungarian composer

== See also ==
- Sugar (disambiguation)
