= Tikar language =

Semi-bantu language in Adamawa Region, Cameroon

Tikar
- Native to: Cameroon
- Ethnicity: Tikar, Bedzan
- Native speakers: 110,000 (2005)
- Language family: Niger–Congo?: Atlantic–Congo; Volta-Congo; Benue–Congo; Bantoid; Northern Bantoid; Tikar
- Dialects: Ndobo; Bedzan (Medzan)

Language codes
- ISO 639-3: tik
- Glottolog: tika1246

Tikar (also called Tigé, Tigré or Tikari) is a Northern Bantoid, semi-Bantu language that is spoken in Cameroon by the Tikar people, as well as by the Bedzan Pygmies, who speak their own dialect of the language. A recent hypothesis by Roger Blench suggests that the Tikar language could be a divergent language in the Niger-Congo language family with an uncertain origin.

== Classification ==
The little evidence available suggests that it is most closely related to the Mambiloid and Dakoid languages.

== Dialects ==
The Tikar language has four dialects, including Tikari, Tigé, and Túmú.
