= Bont =

Bont may refer to:

- Bont F.C., a Welsh association football team
- Bonţ, village in Fizeșu Gherlii Commune, Cluj County, Romania
- Y Bont, nickname for Pontarddulais, a town in Swansea, Wales
- BONT, NASDAQ symbol for The Bon-Ton Stores, Inc.
- BoNT, abbreviation for botulinum toxin
- Debbie Bont, Dutch handball player
- Alexander Bont, fictional character in the Marvel Comics universe
- Robert Bont
- Henry Bont
- Marcus Bontempelli, an Australian rules footballer known by his nickname 'The Bont'.
