= Daka language =

Bantoid language spoken in Nigeria

Daka
- Region: northern Nigeria
- Ethnicity: Chamba people, others
- Native speakers: (120,000 cited 1992–2000)
- Language family: Niger–Congo?: Atlantic–Congo; Volta-Congo; Benue–Congo; Bantoid; Northern Bantoid; Dakoid; Daka–Taram; Daka
- Dialects: Nnakenyare; Mapeo; Jangani; Lamja; Dirim

Language codes
- ISO 639-3: Variously: ccg – Chamba Daka dir – Dirim ldh – Lamja–Dengsa–Tola
- Glottolog: tara1325

Daka (Dakka, Dekka, rarely Deng or Tikk) is one of two languages spoken by the Chamba people in Nigeria, the other being Chamba Leko.

== Varieties ==
Daka is a dialect cluster. The Chamba dialect is called Chamba Daka (or Samba, Tsamba, Tchamba, Sama, Jama Daka; also Nakanyare) and constitutes 90% of speakers. Chamba Daka is also called Sámá Mūm.

Other dialects are Dirim (Dirin, Dirrim), Lamja, Dengsa, and Tola. Dirim and Lamja–Dengsa–Tola have separate ISO coding, but Ethnologue notes that they are 'close to Samba Daka and may be a dialect' or 'may not be sufficiently distinct from Samba Daka to be a separate language', and actually lists Dirim as a dialect under Daka. Blench (2011) lists Dirim as coordinate with other Daka varieties: Nnakenyare, Mapeo, Jangani, Lamja, Dirim, suggesting that if Lamja and Dirim are considered separate languages, as in Ethnologue, then Samba Daka itself needs to be broken up into three additional languages.

Blench lists the following varieties as Samba Daka dialects.

- Samba Jangani
- Samba Nnakenyare
- Samba of Mapeo

== Classification ==
Greenberg placed Samba Daka within his Adamawa proposal, as group G3, but Bennett (1983) demonstrated to general satisfaction that it is a Benue–Congo language, though its placement within Benue–Congo is disputed. Blench (2011) considers it to be Bantoid. Boyd (ms), however, considers Daka an isolate branch within Niger–Congo (Blench 2008). Blench (2011) lists Taram as a separate, though closely related, language.

== Phonology ==
=== Vowels ===
	Front	Central	Back
Close	i		u
Close-mid	e	ə	o
Open-mid	ɛ	ə	ɔ
Open		a	

=== Consonants ===
		Labial	Alveolar	Dorsal	
		Labial	Alveolar	plain	labial
Nasal		m	n	ŋ	
Plosive	voiceless	p	t	k	k͡p
Plosive	voiced	b	d	g	ɡ͡b
Plosive	prenasal	ᵐb	ⁿt	ᵑk	ᵑ͡ᵐk͡p
Affricate/ Fricative	voiceless	f	s		
Affricate/ Fricative	voiced	v	d͡z ~ z		
Affricate/ Fricative	prenasal		ⁿs		
Approximant	oral		l	j	w
Approximant	nasalized			j̃	w̃
Vibrant		ⱱ	ɾ ~ r		

- /d͡z/ is mostly realized as an affricate [d͡z] but may also be realized as a fricative [z].
- /ɾ/ is mostly realized as a tap [ɾ] but may also be realized as a trill [r].

== Bibliography ==
- Blench, Roger (2019). An Atlas of Nigerian Languages (4th ed.). Cambridge: Kay Williamson Educational Foundation.
- Boyd, Raymond (n.d.). The Phonology and Tonology of Chamba Daka (Sámá Mūm) (PDF). Laboratoire Ligérien de Linguistique, Université d’Orléans.
