= BQD =

BQD may refer to:

- The Building Quality Department, a Singaporean governmental department
- The ISO 639-3 code of the Bung language, bqd
