= Dong language =

Dong may refer to:

- Dong language (China), a Kra–Dai language of China
- Dong language (Nigeria), a Niger–Congo language of Nigeria
