= Ndunda language =

Mambiloid language of Nigeria

Ndunda
- Native to: Nigeria
- Region: Taraba State
- Native speakers: (350 cited 1999)
- Language family: Niger–Congo?: Atlantic–Congo; Benue–Congo; Mambiloid; Mambila–Konja; Mambila–Vute; Kamkam; Ndunda

Language codes
- ISO 639-3: nuh
- Glottolog: ndun1251
- ELP: Ndunda
- Ndunda is classified as Severely Endangered by the UNESCO Atlas of the World's Languages in Danger

Ndunda is a minor Mambiloid language of Nigeria. It was discovered by Roger Blench near the Mvanip-speaking town of Zongo Ajiya. Ndunda village is situated about 5 kilometers from Yerimaru, to the south of Zongo Ajiya. It is closely related to but distinct from Mvanip.
