= Somyev language =

Moribund Mambiloid language of Nigeria and Cameroon

Somyev
- Kila, Somyɛv, Somyewe, Zhuzhun
- Sombə
- Native to: Nigeria, Cameroon
- Native speakers: 2 (2013)
- Language family: Niger–Congo?: Atlantic–Congo; Benue–Congo; Mambiloid; Mambila–Konja; Mambila–Vute; Kamkam languages; Somyev

Language codes
- ISO 639-3: kgt
- Glottolog: somy1238
- ELP: Somyev

Somyev (Somyewe, Somyɛv, Somyev: Sombə, Zhuzhun), also known as Kila, Kilayen, or Kila Yang ('blacksmith' in Fulfulde), is a nearly extinct Mambiloid language of two villages, one in Nigeria and one in Cameroon, that was traditionally spoken by a caste of blacksmiths that live among the Mambila. The youngest generation of speakers were born in the 1950s. Transmission of the language ceased when the profession of blacksmithing lost its social status, partly due to imports of foreign tools.

== Etymology ==
The name Somyev for the people and language originates from the Mambila language. Kila and Kilayen are the singular and plural forms for 'blacksmith' in Fulfulde; presumably, "Kila Yang" is an anglicisation of the plural form. Even though the term "Somyewe" is also attested in the literature, it was not known to the last speakers of Somyev. In the village of Hore Taram Torbi in Cameroon, the Somyev people and language were called Zhuzhun.

== History ==
Around the beginning of the 20th century, but possibly as early as the late 18th century, the Somyev migrated from the Adamawa Plateau, near the modern village of Gandoua, to their current location. The direction of migration is the opposite of that recorded in Mambila tradition. The Somyev, in their oral tradition, state that this was in pursuit of better farmland. The Somyev of Kila Yang do not remember their original homeland, whereas the Zhuzhun record their origin as being from a place called Sagura. Possibly, the Chamba or Fula people invaded the Somyev territory, thus causing their migration, as maintained by the Zhuzhun. The language was not used as a sociolect or a trade jargon; rather, it was used by the Somyev in daily communication.

== Classification ==
Somyev is a member of the Mambiloid languages. It was sometimes believed to be closely related to or a variety of Wawa or Vute; however, these beliefs are due to the association of the Somyev with the Wawa people. Bruce Connell believed that it was "apparently relatively closely related to Wawa and other languages of the region".

== Geographic distribution ==
As of 1997, Somyev was spoken in two villages, Kila Yang in the Mambilla Plateau region of Taraba State, Nigeria, and Hore Taram Torbi in Cameroon. Charles Kingsley Meek believed that the Somyev were recent immigrants to the area, as they had, at least at the time, preserved their original language.

== Status ==
Somyev is a moribund language. The youngest generation of speakers was born in the 1950s. The oldest generation of blacksmiths in Kila Yang, as of 2021, and born in the 1920s and 30s, were the first to learn the Mambila language, specifically the Maberem dialect. In 1997, only around 20 speakers were left; by 2010, this number had decreased to two fluent speakers. At least two other rememberers lived in Hore Taram Torbi. A now-deceased speaker of Somyev in Hore Taram Torbi was said to be the last fluent speaker of the language there in 1997. Certain middle-aged people know Somyev passively, and younger people do not speak Somyev in any capacity.

The loss of blacksmithing traditions among the Somyev has resulted in the language's current endangerment. The Somyev traditionally held a monopoly on the manufacturing of hoes, but with the arrival of imported hoes, blacksmithing lost its importance and has affected the vitality of the language. Blacksmithing is still practised by the Somyev, although it is not practised as a trade, and scrap iron is used instead of smelting. Connell thought the endangerment of Somyev to be "[o]n the surface, at least...anomalous", as it was due to economic and cultural change rather than due to a population decline, the cause of endangerment for most languages in Africa. The Somyev use Fulfulde as a lingua franca, but the Maberem and Torbi varieties of Mambila are spoken as a first language by the younger Somyev, and are used as the language of daily communication in their communities. The Somyev people are still aware of their heritage as blacksmiths and the existence of their former language.

== Morphology ==
=== Pronouns ===
In Mambiloid languages, the same pronouns typically mark subject and object, although the possessive pronouns differ, according to McConnell, in "at least some persons". In Somyev, the second person singular and first person plural pronouns set it apart from the other members of Mambiloid.

Pronouns in Somyev
	SG	PL
1	mə́	tə̂
2	bə̄	nà, barai
3	wɔ̂	bə̄kə̄bá

=== Nouns ===
==== Noun class ====
The Mambiloid languages preserve remnants of a noun class system. In Somyev, the following words may preserve a marker for noun class 6a, used for liquids and mass nouns.

gloss	Somyev
blood	dʒɛ̀m̄
urine	núɔ̄m
tear(s)	jáɾı̀
wine	duoma
beer	kam

== Vocabulary ==
=== Numerals ===
Numerals in Somyev
Numeral	Somyev
1	mwē
2	hàːn
3	tàːr
4	nàːn
5	tíɛ̂n
6	tɛ́mwe
7	tɛ́nàːn
8	tɛ́ntàːr
9	tɛ́nnàːn
10	tʃóŋ
