= Taram language =

Language of Nigeria

Taram
- Native to: Nigeria
- Region: Adamawa State
- Language family: Niger–Congo?: Atlantic–Congo; Benue–Congo; Dakoid; Daka–Taram; Taram

Language codes
- ISO 639-3: –
- Glottolog: tara1314

Taram is a language of Nigeria. It has traditionally been considered a dialect of Daka, but appears to be more divergent than that. It is poorly documented, only attested in a publication from 1931.

Meek (1931) reported that Taram was spoken by the Daka living around the confluence of the Taraba River and the rivers Kam and Yim.
