= Sugar Sugar (disambiguation) =

"Sugar, Sugar" is a 1969 song by The Archies.

Sugar Sugar may also refer to:

- Sugar Sugar (company), an American confectionery manufacturer and retailer based in Florida
- Sugar, Sugar, a 2012 web game by Bart Bonte
- Sugar Sugar, a 2015 single album by Laboum

== See also ==
- Sugar Sugar Rune, a manga (comic) and anime television series
- "Suga Suga", a 2003 song by Baby Bash
