= Nizaa people =

Ethnic group of Cameroon

The Nizaa people are an ethnic group of Cameroon. They are primarily agricultural and most are Muslim, with a minority who practice traditional beliefs or Christianity. They speak the Nizaa language.

The Nizaa are divided into clans, each with its own sacred animal which they do not eat or harm; traditionally, it is thought that these animals helped a clan overcome a stressful situation in the mythological past.

== Agriculture ==
The Nizaa are primarily farmers. They used to grow finger millet and sorghum as their main crops, with yom grass (Tephrosia vogelii) being planted after harvest. Tephrosia vogelii is often used to replenish nitrogen in the soil and kill pests, as the plant contains rotenoids, which are a natural pesticide. However, Fula pastoralists practiced transhumance, or moving cattle into river valleys and farmlands during the dry season to find grass and water. Because millet matures late, Fula cattle herds had already started migrating through the fields, and they would eat or trample both the millet and yom grass. As a result, the Nizaa switched to primarily growing maize in the 1950s and 1960s, which has a growth cycle of only four months. The Nizaa also grow other crops such as yams, peanuts, and cassava, and their main food is a paste made from cooked flour, sorghum, millet, or cassava. Hunting and fishing are also regular food sources among the Nizaa, with beekeeping and ironsmithing being used as sources of income by some communities.

== History ==
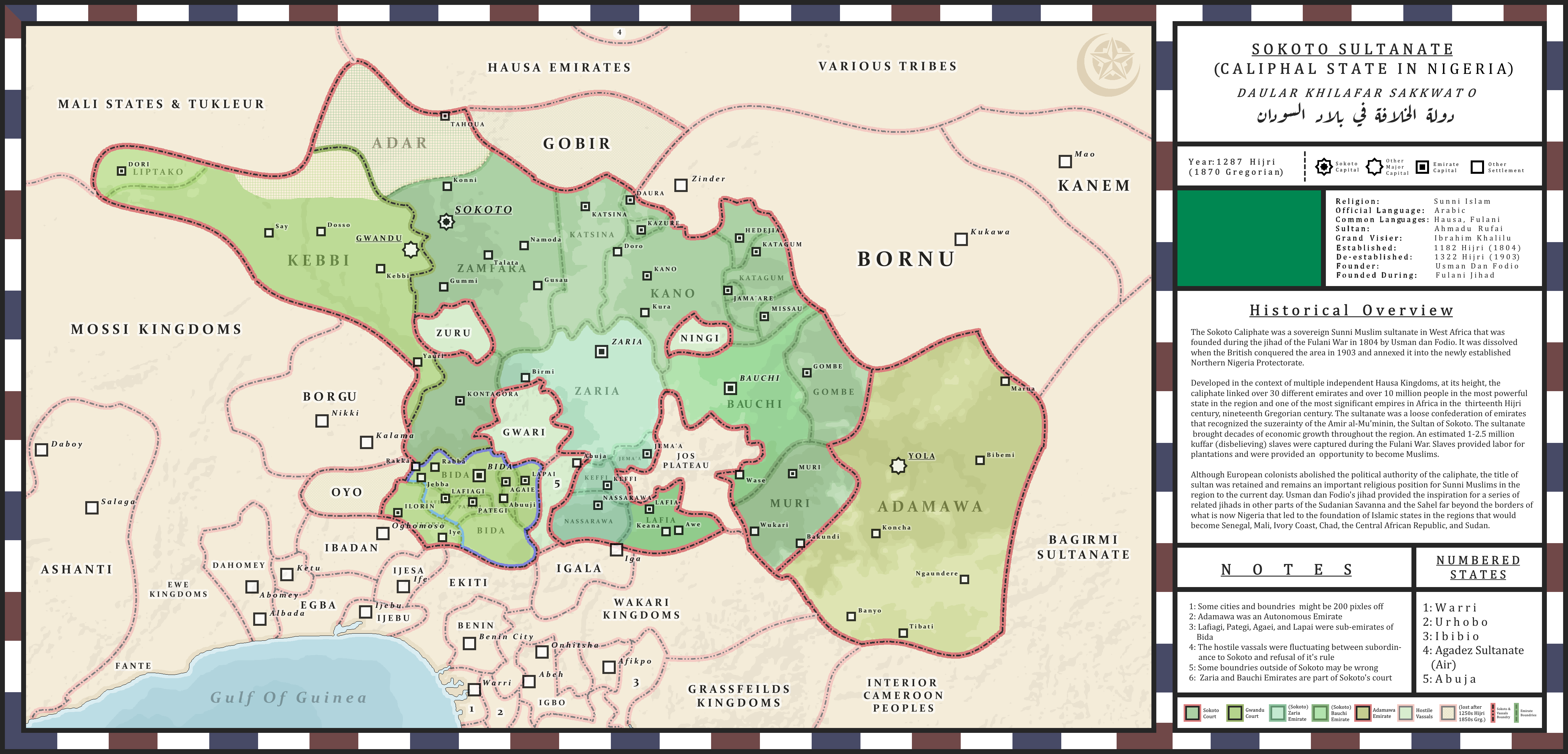
Map of the Sokoto Caliphate around 1870, with the Adamawa Emirate to the southeast

The Nizaa have an oral tradition that they originated in Bibemi, a town in the North Region of Cameroon, before migrating south to the Galim area. According to one version of this tradition, part of the population left Bibemi following a conflict between a chief named Goloia and the Fula. However, anthropologist Philip E. Leis noted that accounts of the migration were often vague and contradictory, and that linguistic evidence raised doubts about a direct connection between the populations of Bibemi and Galim. A people called the "Nyam-nyam", who spoke the Nimbari language, lived in the Bibemi region, but were completely assimilated by the Fula by the beginning of the twentieth century. It is not clear whether these people were related to the Nizaa, because the term Nyam-nyam was applied by Islamised peoples to numerous groups who practised traditional religions.

According to traditions recorded by Leis, the ancestors of the Nizaa did not originally form a single unified people. Instead, several groups arrived in the Galim region at different times and formed separate clans, which elderly informants recalled as culturally distinct and possibly even linguistically different. The Nizaa believe that they settled in Galim around 1765 under their first chief, Túkúm Ríìcùn. This migration narrative is central to Nizaa cultural identity and pride, as they view their homeland as having been earned through effort and resilience.

In the early nineteenth century, Usman dan Fodio launched a jihad with the goal of reforming and expanding Islam in West Africa, leading to the establishment of the Sokoto Caliphate. From the 1830s to the 1850s, his disciple Modibo Adama led the Fula expansion into Adamawa, establishing the Adamawa Emirate with Yola as its capital and creating more than forty lamidates. The expansion introduced Islam as a source of political legitimacy, encouraged the spread of Fulfulde as a lingua franca, and brought slave raiding and economic exploitation to many non-Muslim groups.

The Nizaa responded by retreating to fortified settlements on Jim Mountain near Galim. In 1856 and 1865, the ruler of the Lamidate of Tibati unsuccessfully attempted to conquer the settlement, whose mountain location made cavalry attacks difficult. According to Nizaa oral traditions, repeated attacks by the lamidates of Tibati, Banyo and Tignère continued for decades, but the Nizaa successfully resisted them from their mountain strongholds. During this period, the Nizaa developed a stronger common identity, and Leis argued that prolonged resistance to the Fula contributed to the emergence of a unified Nizaa political organisation. The Nizaa also became a constant threat to surrounding groups, raiding trade caravans and stealing cattle from the nomadic Jafun Fula for food.

In 1902, the Germans, who had gained control of Cameroon during the Scramble for Africa and defeated the Adamawa Emirate in the Adamawa Wars, burned the fortified Nizaa settlement on Jim Mountain in an attempt to end resistance. However, the Nizaa retreated into caves and continued fighting. In 1906, a Nizaa war party killed several German soldiers and captured their firearms. In response, German forces and allied Fula lamidates used artillery, sieges and famine to subdue the Nizaa, who continued to resist through guerrilla warfare under chief Njomna. This conflict lasted until 1915, when French and British forces occupied Cameroon during World War I.

After 1915, the French ended the long-running conflict between the Nizaa and the Lamidate of Tibati and encouraged the Nizaa to leave their mountain settlements and establish themselves at Galim. Over time, the Nizaa became increasingly integrated into the French colonial administration while retaining their traditional chieftaincy. Islam gradually spread among the Nizaa, partly because it had become associated with political legitimacy and chiefly authority. A more active process of Islamisation began after 1956 under chief Mohammadou Diallo Hamadina, and traditional religious practices have steadily declined since then.

Today, most Nizaa practise Islam, though some follow Christianity or traditional religious beliefs incorporating ancestor worship and animism.

== Language ==
The Nizaa people speak the Nizaa language.

== Bibliography ==
- Kjelsvik, Bjørghild (31 March 2008). Emergent speech genres of teaching and learning interaction. Communities of practice in Cameroonian schools and villages. Faculty of Humanities (Linguistics PhD thesis). University of Oslo. pp. 91–134 – via ResearchGate.
- Endresen, Rolf [in Norwegian] (30 June 1992). "La phonologie de la langue nizaa (nizaà)" [The phonology of the Nizaa language]. Nordic Journal of African Studies (in French). 1 (1). Nordic Africa Research Network: 28–52. doi:10.53228/njas.v1i1.57.
- Leis, Philip E. (1970). "Accommodation in a Plural Chiefdom (Cameroon)". Man. 5 (4): 671–685. doi:10.2307/2799110. ISSN 0025-1496.
