= Henry Bont =

14th-century English Member of Parliament

Henry Bont was an English Member of Parliament.

Bont was likely related to the MP for Salisbury, Robert Bont.

He was a Member (MP) of the Parliament of England for Wilton in 1368, 1373, 1378, 1381, April 1384 and 1393.
