= Kamkam language =

Mambiloid language of Nigeria

Mbongno
- Kamkam
- Native to: Nigeria, Cameroon
- Native speakers: (3,000 in Nigeria cited 1999)
- Language family: Niger–Congo?: Atlantic–Congo; Benue–Congo; Mambiloid; Mambila–Konja; Mambila–Vute; Kamkam languages; Mbongno

Language codes
- ISO 639-3: bgu
- Glottolog: mbon1253
- ELP: Mbongno

Mbongno (Bungnu), also known as Kamkam, is a Mambiloid language of Nigeria, with an unknown number of speakers in Cameroon.
