= Dong language (Nigeria) =

Niger–Congo language of Nigeria

Dong
- Donga
- Native to: Nigeria
- Region: Taraba State, Adamawa State
- Native speakers: (5,000 cited 1998)
- Language family: Niger–Congo?: Atlantic–Congo; Benue–Congo; Dakoid; Gaa–Dong; Dong

Language codes
- ISO 639-3: doh
- Glottolog: dong1293
- ELP: Dong

Dong, or Donga, is a poorly documented language in Nigeria. Though clearly Niger–Congo, it is difficult to classify; British linguist Roger Blench proposes that it is one of the Dakoid languages, the closest to Gaa.

== Bibliography ==
- Blench, Roger (n.d.) 'The Dɔ̃ (Dong) language and its affinities'. Ms. circulated at the 27th Colloquium on African Languages and Linguistics, Leiden, 1994.
- Blench, Roger (2008) 'Prospecting proto-Plateau'. Manuscript.
- Blench, Roger (2011) 'The membership and internal structure of Bantoid and the border with Bantu'. Bantu IV, Humboldt University, Berlin.
