= Mambiloid languages =

Branch of Benue–Congo languages of Cameroon and Nigeria

Mambiloid
- Geographic distribution: Nigeria and Cameroon
- Linguistic classification: Niger–Congo?: Atlantic–Congo; Volta-Congo; Benue–Congo; Bantoid; Northern Bantoid; Mambiloid
- Subdivisions: Ndoola (Ndoro); Mambiloid proper

Language codes
- Glottolog: mamb1309
- The Mambiloid languages shown within Nigeria and Cameroon

The twelve Mambiloid languages are languages spoken by the Mambila and related peoples mostly in eastern Nigeria and in Cameroon. In Nigeria the largest group is Mambila (there is also a small Mambila population in Cameroon). In Cameroon the largest group is Vute.

== Languages ==
The following classification follows Blench (2011). Languages with (?) are not listed in that source, but close to other languages according to Ethnologue. Ndoro–Fam may be a separate branch of Benue–Congo.

- Mambiloid
  - Ndoola (Ndoro)
  - Mambiloid proper
    - Nizaa (Suga)
    - Mambila–Konja
      - Konja: Kwanja, ?Twendi
      - Mambila–Vute
        - Mambila–Kamkam
          - Magu–Kamkam–Kila: Mbongno, Mvanip (Mvano), ?Somyev, ?Ndunda
          - Mambila
        - Tep–Vute
          - Tep
          - Vute: Vute, Wawa

Ethnologue also lists Njerep, which most likely lies somewhere in the Mambila–Kamkam branch. The extinct Yeni and Luo (Kasabe) languages were apparently Mambiloid, close to Njerep.

Fam is sometimes classified with Ndoro, but appears to be more divergent.

The unclassified language Bung shows its strongest resemblance to be with the Ndung dialect of Kwanja. It also has words in common with other Mambiloid languages such as Tep, Somyev and Vute, while a number of words' origins remain unclear (possibly Adamawan).

== Names and locations (Nigeria) ==
Below is a list of language names, populations, and locations (in Nigeria only) from Blench (2019).

Language	Dialects	Alternate spellings	Own name for language	Endonym(s)	Other names (location-based)	Other names for language	Exonym(s)	Speakers	Location(s)
Mbɔŋnɔ		Bungnu	Mbọngnọ	Mbọngnọ	Kamkam	Kakaba, Bunu		800 (1952 W&B); 3000 est. Blench and Connell (1999)	Taraba State, Sardauna LGA, Kakara town
Ndoola	At least 2 dialects	Ndoro	Ndoola	Ndoola	Njoyamɛ (in Cameroon)			1169 (1952 W&B); 10,000 total, 1,300 in Cameroon (1982 SIL); estimated more than 15,000 (1999)	Taraba State, Sardauna and Gashaka LGAs; and in Cameroon (1 village only)
Vute	At least 6 dialects	Bute, Mbute, Wute, Voute		Mbutere				1,000 or less in Nigeria; 30,000 in Cameroon (1985 EELC)	Taraba State, Sardauna LGA; northeast Mambila Plateau, but mainly in Cameroon
Tep								A single village and associated hamlets. <4000	Taraba State. Mambila Plateau
Mambila	Almost every village has a separate dialect forming a dialect chain. Dialect centres are: Bang, Dorofi, Gembu, Hainari, Kabri, Mayo Ndaga, Mbamnga, Tamien, Warwar. At least 4 dialects in Cameroon.		Ju Nɔri	Nɔr	Mambila, Mambilla, Mambere			18,000 (1952); 60,000 (1973 SIL); 10,000 in Cameroon	Taraba State, Sardauna LGA. Mambila Plateau. Cameroon.
Mvanɨp				Mvanɔ	Magu			100 (Blench 1999)	Taraba State, Sardauna LGA. A single quarter of Zongo Ajiya town in the northwest of the Mambila Plateau.
Ndunda								400 (Blench 1999)	Taraba State, Sardauna LGA. In northwest Mambila Plateau.
Somyɛv		Somyewe		Somyewe	Kila, Zuzun			2 (2010)	Taraba State, Sardauna LGA, (Blacksmiths’ dialect). Kila Yang village, 10 km. west of Mayo Ndaga. Also formerly spoken in Cameroon
Fam			Fam	Fam			Kɔŋa, Konga	Fewer than 1,000 (1984); <500 (2016)	Taraba State, Bali LGA, 17km east of Kungana
