= Sugarland (disambiguation) =

Sugarland is a country music duo.

Sugarland or Sugar Land may also refer to:

- Sugar Land, Texas, a city sometimes misspelled as "Sugarland"
- The Sugarlands, a valley in the Southeastern United States
- Sugarland (album), by Kissing the Pink
- Sugarland (EP), by Magnapop
- "Sugar Land" (Lioness), a 2026 television episode

== See also ==
- The Sugarland Express, a 1974 film
