= Cambap language =

Mambiloid language of Cameroon

Cambap
- Twendi
- Native to: Cameroon
- Ethnicity: 1,000 (1991)
- Native speakers: (30 cited 2000)
- Language family: Niger–Congo?: Atlantic–Congo; Benue–Congo; Mambiloid; Mambila–Konja; Konja; Cambap

Language codes
- ISO 639-3: twn
- Glottolog: twen1242
- ELP: Twendi

Cambap, or Twendi as it is also known, is a nearly extinct Mambiloid language of Cameroon. Speakers have largely shifted to the closely related language Kwanja, and Cambap has not been passed down to children for decades. The language is spoken in the villages of Cambap and Sanga on the Tikar Plain by no more than 30 people, the youngest of whom were born in the 1940s.

== Classification ==
Cambap is a Mambiloid language belonging to the Mambila group. Speakers consider Cambap to be a dialect of Kwanja, but lexical evidence from a variety of Mambiloid languages, especially Kabri, indicates its affinity to the Mambila group.
