= Sugar City =

Sugar City may refer to a place in the United States:

- Sugar City, Colorado
- Sugar City, Idaho
- Sugar City, Halfweg sugar factory
- It can also refer to Lautoka, Fiji's second largest city and home to the Pacific's largest sugar mill
