= John Harmon Charles Bonté =

- Born: 1831; Circleville, Ohio, United States
- Died: 1896 (aged 64–65); United States
- Education: St. John's College, Cincinnati; Kenyon College
- Occupations: Lawyer, Episcopal priest, university administrator
- Employers: University of California; Hastings College of the Law
- Known for: Secretary of the Regents; Professor of Legal Ethics; Rector of Grace Episcopal Church
- Title: Secretary of the Board of Regents
- Term: 1881–1896
- Spouse: Emily Woodbury Storer
- Children: 4
- Awards: Doctor of Divinity (Kenyon College, 1880)

John Harmon Charles Bonté (1831–1896) was a lawyer, Episcopal priest, and secretary of the board of regents of the University of California from 1881 to 1896. He also held the offices of land agent, superintendent of buildings and grounds, and secretary of the academic senate. He was a professor of legal ethics at the university's affiliate, Hastings College of the Law. He worked tirelessly for the independence and advancement of the university for 15 crucial years in its early development.

== Early life and education ==
Bonté was born in Circleville, Ohio, in 1831 and received his early education in Cincinnati. He attended St. John's College there and continued his education by way of private instruction. After studying law in an eastern law school and with Bellamy Storer in Cincinnati, he was admitted to the practice of law at age 20 and married Storer's daughter, Emily Woodbury Storer, in 1851. They had four children: Frances (b. 1853), Charles (b. 1857), Eliza (b. 1858) and Mary (b. 1861). After practicing law for several years, which included a term as Justice of the Peace in Knox County, Ohio in 1856, Bonté then attended Kenyon College where he studied for the Episcopal priesthood. He was ordained in 1857. He was subsequently elected as one of the Trustees of Kenyon College.

During the U.S. Civil War, Bonté volunteered as chaplain for the 43d Ohio Regiment for nine months. He was stationed near New Madrid, Missouri, where he participated in the Battle of Island No. 10 on the Mississippi River in April 1862. He resigned his position after suffering from fever.

He was then rector of Old Christ Church in Georgetown, D.C. (1864–1866) and later rector of the Church of the Evangelist in Oswego, New York.

== Sacramento years ==
Bonté moved with his family to Sacramento, California, to be rector of Grace Episcopal Church in 1870, possibly for health reasons. Notable parishioners included Leland Stanford and Charles Crocker. While in Sacramento, he was involved in many civic activities, serving as Chaplain of the California State Assembly (1871–1872), Grand Orator of the Grand Lodge of California (Masonic order) in 1876. In 1879 he was nominated by the Workingmen's Party to run for Superintendent of Schools, which he declined. He gave testimony to the California Special Committee on Chinese Immigration, to whom he recommended education, restricted immigration, and conversion to Christianity for Chinese in California. Concerned that anti-immigrant sentiment could lead to the "wholesale slaughter" of the Chinese population, Bonté transmitted a letter via Columbus Delano to President Ulysses S. Grant in 1876 recommending Presidential intervention. No action was taken. He also served as Chaplain of the State Senate for four years.

He was a dedicated outdoorsman and enjoyed fishing in the Big Meadows area in Plumas County now covered by Lake Almanor. An article published in the Sacramento Union in December 1881 has been cited as an indication of 19th-century salmon population. He was often accompanied by his friend Dr. H. W. Harkness and civil engineer Arthur W. Keddie. Keddie named Bonté Peak, now in Lassen National Park, and Mt. Harkness for his two friends.

In 1880, Kenyon College conferred on him the degree of Doctor of Divinity.

He served as rector of St. Peter's Episcopal Church in Redwood City briefly after leaving the rectorship in Sacramento. He left Redwood City to accept the appointment to be Secretary of the Board of Regents of the University of California at Berkeley in August 1881, having left the pulpit because of the failure of his voice. In appointing J.H.C. Bonté, the Regents recruited a man who "fiercely guarded his prerogatives in all (his) capacities. There were proprieties, rules, and procedures he expected to be observed. He observed them meticulously himself. Only those who did not know him or who had skins thick enough to withstand the heat of his wrath evaded his dicta."

== The University in 1881 ==
There were 224 students enrolled at Berkeley in the academic year of 1881–1882. 52 of them were women; three were graduate students. The faculty numbered 30. The major buildings on the campus were North Hall, South Hall, the Bacon Library and the Harmon Gymnasium. The office of the Secretary was located in South Hall, the only one of these buildings which still stands.

It was a tumultuous time. The nation was in financial crisis, and student conduct was out of hand at Berkeley. Fraternity hi-jinks resulted in the Regents' suspension of secret societies in 1879. That year, the sophomore class published a parody of the Junior Class Day program, considered "obscene" by the standards of the day, and President John LeConte suspended most of the sophomore class. These events, and the University's own financial difficulties, led to his resignation as President in 1881.

President LeConte's weakness was hardly his fault. The years 1875-1900 have been termed "The Era of Powerless Presidents" by University historian Verne Steadman. The Board of Regents ran the school, hiring and firing faculty, and attending to details in a way that can only be termed "micromanagement". The University President was largely a figurehead: fundraiser, PR man, and liaison between the Regents and faculty. Presidents Reid (1881–1885), Holden (1885–1888) and Davis (1881–1890) each complained of the interference of the Regents and the powerlessness of the Presidency. In 1891 President Kellog was the first to gain some limited authority over the Regents, and in particular, over the Secretary. In his memoir, Clark Kerr calls this the 'first major decentralization' of Regental authority.

The real power in those years lay in the office of the Secretary of the Board of Regents, who was responsible for keeping the records of the Regents' transactions, corresponding with learned, professional, and technical societies, collecting seeds and plants from all over the world, as well as being the chief accounting officer and business manager for the University. It was a nearly impossible task. In time J.H.C. Bonté also served as Superintendent of Buildings and Grounds, Land Agent, Secretary of the Academic Senate, and Professor of Legal Ethics at Hastings College of the Law.

When J.H.C. Bonté began his years at Berkeley, the University had recently survived political attacks from the State Grange and the Workingmen's Party in the 1870s that attempted to abolish the Regents (claimed by them to be corrupt) and to establish a school of agriculture, mining, and mechanical arts, more in keeping with the needs of a growing state than a school of 'Eastern' and 'gentlemanly training.' Fortunately, the state constitution of 1879 established the University as a "public trust" and gave it such independence that it has been termed "the fourth branch of state government".

== Campus life ==
While University presidents came and went, Dr. Bonté exercised considerable authority over University affairs for fifteen years. Because of his righteous bearing, personal integrity, and intolerance for slackers, the students referred to him as the "Chief Cop" and nicknamed him "Jesus H. Christ Bonté". There is much presumably good-natured ribbing in the 'Blue and Gold' annuals published by the students in those years. Lincoln Steffens, in his autobiography, reports a humorous incident when he and his fraternity brothers were invited to the Bonté house to be fed some chickens that they didn't quite steal from the Bonté henhouse. Steffens describes Bonté as "the popular treasurer (sic) of the University" and portrays a man with a keen sense of humor and intellect.

The 1892 'Blue and Gold' parodies J.H.C. Bonté in the farcical Junior Class play depicting the University as a 'headless' institution with no president and "The Rev. U. B. Blode" as an officious, ambitious little man, nailing signs on everything and every person declaring "PROPERTY OF THE STATE" and telling all who will or won't listen that "I AM THE SECRETARY!" and in general making a nuisance of himself. At one point he is about to be boiled in an iron pot by the natives (students) and but is rescued by the Regents, only to be eventually vanquished by the Alumni.

Bonté did not shirk from his considerable power whenever he thought it should be exercised. He decreed in 1896 that no baseball would be played on University grounds on Sundays when it was discovered that two teams unaffiliated with the University scheduled a game on campus. Tickets had been printed and sold (ten cents each). Bonté announced that the University police officer (there was only one) would arrest anyone who showed up to the game. There were, in those years, no activities at all on campus on Sundays. Visitors and families "enjoy the quietness and beauty of the place, and to allow a baseball game to intrude on such a scene would be monstrous", he said. There were no arrests; the organizers of the game wisely made other arrangements.

Occasionally he would overstep his bounds. Military training was part of the mandatory curriculum, and when the professor of military science had the cadets collect the spent brass shells, sell them for scrap (for $1.75) and then use the money to paint the targets, Bonté claimed corruption and complained to the War Department in Washington, D.C., who, after due investigation, failed to find any wrongdoing. The professor complained to the appropriate committee of the regents. The plan was for Bonté to be "quietly and severely rebuked" at the next regents' meeting for his "unauthorized, uncalled for, and improper" action. (And so he was.) The San Francisco Chronicle got wind of the matter and printed a story of "personal spite, overzealous officiousness, and laughable invocation of the power of the Government regarding a few empty cartridge shells picked up off the grass."

That the regents kept him on as secretary despite his chronic irascibility for 15 years is a testament to what he did accomplish. He was privy to nearly all of the Regents' deliberations, and he frequently drove himself to exhaustion from overwork.

In 1883, Bonté advocated the enlargement of the university printing office. "Provision should be made for an establishment that will enable the faculty to publish numerous bulletins upon important subjects and the University will never perform its whole duty to the people until this is done. This is a grave matter and deserves thorough consideration." It took ten years, until 1893, for the Regents to designate sufficient money ($1,000) to really get the printing office off the ground. The Printing Office was the progenitor of the University of California Press

Probably Bonté's most important contribution to the University was his advocacy and successful lobbying for the "penny tax", which gave the University automatic funding without having to go to the state legislature, hat in hand, each year for specific appropriations, thus freeing the funding of the University from the vagaries of political pressures.

The University of California was a "Land-grant university" whereby the federal government granted land to states that was then sold to fund public colleges. By 1881, this funding was no longer meeting the needs of the growing institution. A permanent funding source was desperately needed, especially for capital improvements. Requests to the legislature for specific purposes left little in the way of discretionary flexibility.

In 1883, Bonté suggested that a "certain percentage of the annual taxes of the State of California be devoted to the University for a number of years." President Reid endorsed the idea and recommended it to the Regents in 1884. President Holden lobbied for this, too, in 1884 and again in 1885, suggesting a payment into a special fund of one cent on every $100 of assessed property in the State of California, paid annually.

In 1886 Bonté co-authored a bill to do just that. After revisions, it was presented to the legislature by Henry Vrooman, state senator from Alameda County. When amendments were proposed in the state assembly mandating that half the money be used for permanent improvements, they failed to pass because of J.H.C. Bonté's personal assurance that they were unnecessary because the intent would be followed even if the restriction was not in the bill. The law as enacted by the legislature allowed the Regents "or such officers of the Board as may be duly authorized thereto" to draw on the fund at any time and account for the expenses later. The law took place immediately upon passage, February 14, 1887.

Beginning in 1886, Bonté taught Legal Ethics at Hastings College of the Law, bringing his clerical background and training as a practicing attorney to bear in a course of 10 or 12 lectures to the senior class, sometimes with "great difficulty" because of continued problems with his voice and health. He considered these lectures as a partial satisfaction of his clerical duties as an ordained Episcopal priest. He was a popular lecturer and at the time Hastings was unique in recognizing the importance of ethics as part of a legal education. He served without pay. The relationship of Hastings to the University of California has always been confusing. It was the desire of founder Serranus Clinton Hastings to found a law school "affiliated" with the University of California but the relationship between Hastings' Board of Trustees and the University's Board of Regents has been "an imperfect relationship and an anomalous structure" from the beginning and the confusion continues to the present day. Litigation and California Supreme Court decisions in the 19th century failed to clarify the situation. In appointing J.H.C. Bonté to be professor of legal ethics, the Regents and the Trustees had in his person a means of communication and of heading off potential problems.

In addition to Hastings, the University was affiliated with a medical school, a pharmacy school, a dental school, and a veterinary college, all located in San Francisco. These institutions were for the most part self-regulating and self-supporting and required little direct attention from the Regents. On behalf of the Regents, Bonté did accept, in 1895, the gift of land from Adolph Sutro where U.C. San Francisco now stands, and one of his first official acts as Secretary in 1881 was to record the Regents' acceptance of affiliation with the Dental Department.

Bonté developed a close relationship with Edward Singleton Holden, who, after serving as University president from 1885 to 1888, became the first director of Lick Observatory on Mount Hamilton. In 1891, while recuperating from exhaustion at his son's home in Sacramento, his wife wrote that a visit to the mountain was not possible for health reasons. In other letters to Holden, he complains of the Regents' refusal to consider bills submitted too late; of having to wait for money from Phoebe Apperson Hearst ("Is the Board expected to advance the money on the Hearst accounts over which the Board has no direct control?"); and that "the time is not right for a School of Astronomy on the mountain (...the man who proposes it now will, I fear, be kicked...)." Bonté also counsels Holden to 'go very slow in making acquisitions" and also advises Holden on personnel problems on the mountain, of which there were many. Holden appreciated Bonté's efforts in advancing the development of the observatory and made public his gratitude in a post-mortem tribute.

In October, 1891, the Rev. Dr. J.H.C. Bonté was one of the visiting dignitaries at the opening of Stanford University in Palo Alto. He gave the benediction at the end of the formal program. At Berkeley, he was the 'tour guide' for visiting notables. In March 1892, he accompanied Oscar Wilde on a campus tour, which attracted a crowd of students. In 1892, Bonté's friend Charles Lanam, secretary to the Japanese Legation, arranged for two young women to stay at the Bonté home before leaving for Japan. They enjoyed attending parties, visiting the Berkeley campus, and shopping. One of these young women was Ume Tsuda, (Tsuda Umeko), who later was a champion for the education of women in Japan in the early 20th century.

J.H.C. Bonté executed his duties with a "scrupulous exactitude" and "unlimited zeal" that "frequently drove him to exhaustion from overwork."

He authored an article on "The Northerly Winds of California" in 1886, speculating on the causes and effects on people, animals and crops of the winds in the Sacramento Valley, which was published by the State of California. He also contributed to "The Pacific Churchman", a periodical published by the Episcopal Diocese of California.

J.H.C. Bonté was not a regent and had no vote on the Board but he expressed his strong opinions at Regents' meetings. In response to a proposal that the Regents appropriate $1,475 for plantings and to remove dirt (so that North Hall would not appear to be "in a hole"), Bonté asked "Shall we sacrifice the education of the students for a few improvements? ... the mind must be cared for first ... the 'ground' must wait for more prosperous times." The Regents then voted to spend $50.00 for the planting of ivy and the Buildings and Grounds Committee then declined even that.

Such thrift accounted for the generally shabby appearance of the university in those years and it was not until after J.H.C. Bonté died in 1896 that sufficient funds were made available from Phoebe Apperson Hearst to truly beautify the campus. The student poet who wrote this in the Blue and Gold for 1896 was right:

When Dr. Bonté's in heaven,
Head-Chief-High-Kicker-Saint
Then, and then only, old North Hall
Shall receive a coat of paint.

— student poet,

== Town and gown ==
Friction between institutions of higher learning and their municipal neighbors is always problematic, and so it was in Berkeley in the Bonté years. It was not only the University that was experiencing growing pains. Berkeley had developed a commercial center Shattuck and Center, a distance of less than a mile from the terminus of Telegraph Avenue, where Sather Gate now stands. Berkeley postmaster Napoleon Byrne moved the post office from Telegraph Avenue to the new commercial district causing inconvenience to the University and to the consternation of Dr. Bonté who boycotted the new post office and had stamps imported from San Francisco. To maintain the status of the Berkeley post office, Byrne had friends of his from San Francisco purchase stamps in Berkeley. Byrne appealed to the Postmaster General in Washington, D.C. who corresponded with Dr. Bonté who acquiesced to Federal pressure and again purchased stamps locally.

The university's attitude regarding the use of its land was accomplished with little regard for the City of Berkeley, and, in fact, the university never made efforts to consult with the city until Chancellor Clark Kerr set up a liaison committee in 1953. As superintendent of buildings and grounds, Bonté was in charge of all university improvements, which included marking the boundaries by placing granite monuments at the corners of the university property. In 1882, the regents employed M. E. King to make a complete survey on the university property, to help "ascertain what parts or parcels of land might be imperiled by adverse possession under the statute of limitations." Some years later, surveyor King, who was then the surveyor for the City of Berkeley, had one of the granite monuments removed as part of a grading operation "against the protest of the protest of the Superintendent of Grounds." Bonté was incensed and in 1891 complained to the Regents that surveyor King "neglects and refuses to replace said monument", despite "frequent" reminders" to replace it. Other complaints against the city included allowing a university sewer pipe to be broken that the city refused to repair, causing sewage to flow into Strawberry Creek; granting a franchise to a street railway over Oxford Street, passing over university ground, the city "meaning thus to do indirectly what they hesitate to do directly"; cutting a university sewer pipe attaching the town sewer to it, and claiming ownership of the University sewer pipe; tearing down a fence built by the University and opening a lane now claimed as a public street, and dumping dirt thereon "as if it were public property." These facts were offered to the regents "as abundant proof of the determination of the Town Trustees to procure and use the University site without consulting the Board of Regents."

Permitting encroachments and public and private non-university use of university property was intolerable because by allowing casual use, public and private easements could accrue. Petitions by adjoining landowners, some of them faculty, for permission for paths across, fences on, or entrances to University property were routinely denied by the regents. In 1885, the regents resolved "That this Board declares its intention to keep the University grounds intact for the sole use of the University, and that no public avenues or streets be permitted through the grounds" and declared that "the privilege of using any of the University grounds is a mere license, revocable at the pleasure of the Board of Regents." When the university entered into an agreement with the City of Berkeley in 1894 to grant the city permission to use the university's Allston Way sewer, the "mere license" was "revocable at any time at the will and the pleasure of the Regents of the University of California" and will never "ripen into any right to or interest in or easement in or to said Allston Way, or the sewer therein. " All work on the project was to be at the expense of the City of Berkeley, and Allston Way "was to be left in a condition ... satisfactory to the Secretary."

== Death ==
J.H.C. Bonté died on November 24, 1896, at his daughter's home in Sacramento, where he was recuperating from a cold. He was 65 years old. The regents' tribute described him as "a man of ripe scholarship and staunch integrity, a keen judge of human nature, an earnest indefatigable worker of strict business methods, and a man full of love for the University, continually watchful of its interests and ever watchful of its good name." His last words were "God Bless you all and the University", and then he died. He is buried in the Sacramento City Cemetery next to his wife, Emily, who lived until 1917.

== Legacy ==
J.H.C. Bonté was the most powerful Secretary in the history of the University of California. No one person ever held the concurrent offices of Superintendent of Buildings and Grounds, Land Agent, and Secretary of the Academic Senate. No building, bench, or plaque honoring him graces any University property. Until the 1970s, his signature could be seen on the diploma of Philip Bowles, displayed in the lobby of Bowles Hall on the Berkeley campus, but it disappeared sometime in the 1970s. For a few years in the early 20th century, the first two blocks of LaLoma Avenue, extending north from Hearst Avenue, were known as Bonté Avenue, but the street was renamed in the interest of continuity or perhaps from municipal memory of town and gown friction. Bonté Peak in Lassen National Park is still on the map.

J.H.C. Bonté did not invent the independence of the University but his jealous guardianship of that independence helped set the stage for the growth of the University in the 20th century to become one of the most prestigious institutions of higher learning in the world. At the entrance and boundaries of University properties worldwide are signs or plaques, unequivocally asserting the sovereignty to the Regents: "PROPERTY OF THE REGENTS OF THE UNIVERSITY OF CALIFORNIA: PERMISSION TO ENTER OR PASS OVER IS REVOCABLE AT ANY TIME." These plaques and signs, and the continuing independence of the University, are the lasting legacy of the Rev. Dr. J.H.C. Bonté.
