= Gãã language =

Language of Nigeria

Gãã
- Tiba
- Native to: Nigeria
- Region: Adamawa State
- Native speakers: (10,000 cited 1997)
- Language family: Niger–Congo?: Atlantic–Congo; Benue–Congo; Dakoid; Gãã

Language codes
- ISO 639-3: ttb
- Glottolog: gaaa1245
- ELP: Gaa

Gãã, or Tiba, is a poorly documented language of Nigeria. It is one of the Dakoid languages.

== Bibliography ==
- Blench, Roger (2008) 'Prospecting proto-Plateau'. Manuscript.
- Blench, Roger (2011) 'The membership and internal structure of Bantoid and the border with Bantu'. Bantu IV, Humboldt University, Berlin.
- Blench, Roger (2025) The mysterious Gãã language
