= Tep language =

Mambiloid language of Nigeria

Tep
- Native to: Nigeria
- Language family: Niger–Congo?: Atlantic–Congo; Benue–Congo; Mambiloid; Mambila–Konja; Mambila–Vute; Tep–Vute; Tep

Language codes
- ISO 639-3: None (mis)
- Glottolog: tepp1235

Tep is a Mambiloid language of Nigeria. Ethnologue considers it a dialect of Mambila, as speakers identify as Mambila, but it is a distinct language.
