= Sugar Island =

Sugar Island may refer to:

Islands

- Sugar Island (Michigan), in the St. Marys River between Michigan and Ontario
- Sugar Island (Detroit River), another Michigan island located in the Detroit River
- Sugar Island (Ohio), one of the Bass Islands in Lake Erie
- Sugar Island (St. Lawrence River), in the Thousand Islands region of Ontario
- Sugar Island (Maine), largest island of Moosehead Lake

Administrative divisions

- Sugar Island Township, Michigan

Unincorporated communities

- Sugar Island, Wisconsin
