= De Bont =

De Bont is a Dutch surname meaning "the colorful", thought to refer in particular to clothing. Variant forms are De Bondt and De Bonte. The name has been Latinized to Bontius. People with the surname include:

(De) Bont

- Ad de Bont (born 1949), Dutch playwright and stage director
- Andy De Bont (born 1974), English football goalkeeper
- Debbie Bont (born 1990), Dutch handball player
- Jan de Bont (born 1943), Dutch cinematographer, director and film producer
- Kevin De Bont (born 1987), Belgian sprint canoer
- Rita De Bont (born 1954), Belgian Vlaams Belang politician

De Bondt

- Cornelis de Bondt (born 1953), Dutch composer
- Dries De Bondt (born 1991), Belgian racing cyclist
- Nick de Bondt (born 1994), Dutch football left winger
- Werner De Bondt (born 1954), Belgian behavioral economist

De Bondt/ De Bont alias Bontius

- Gerard de Bondt (c. 1537–1599), Dutch physician, botanist, mathematician and astronomer
  - Reinier de Bondt (1576–1623), Dutch physician, son of Gerard
  - Jacob de Bondt (1592–1631), Dutch physician and a pioneer of tropical medicine, son of Gerard

(De) Bonte

- Bob Bonte (1929–1988), Dutch breaststroke swimmer
- Friedrich Bonte (1896–1940), German naval officer
- Hans Bonte (born 1962), Belgian politician
- Marc de Bonte (1990–2016), Belgian kickboxer
