= Miklós Sugár =

Hungarian conductor, music educator, and composer

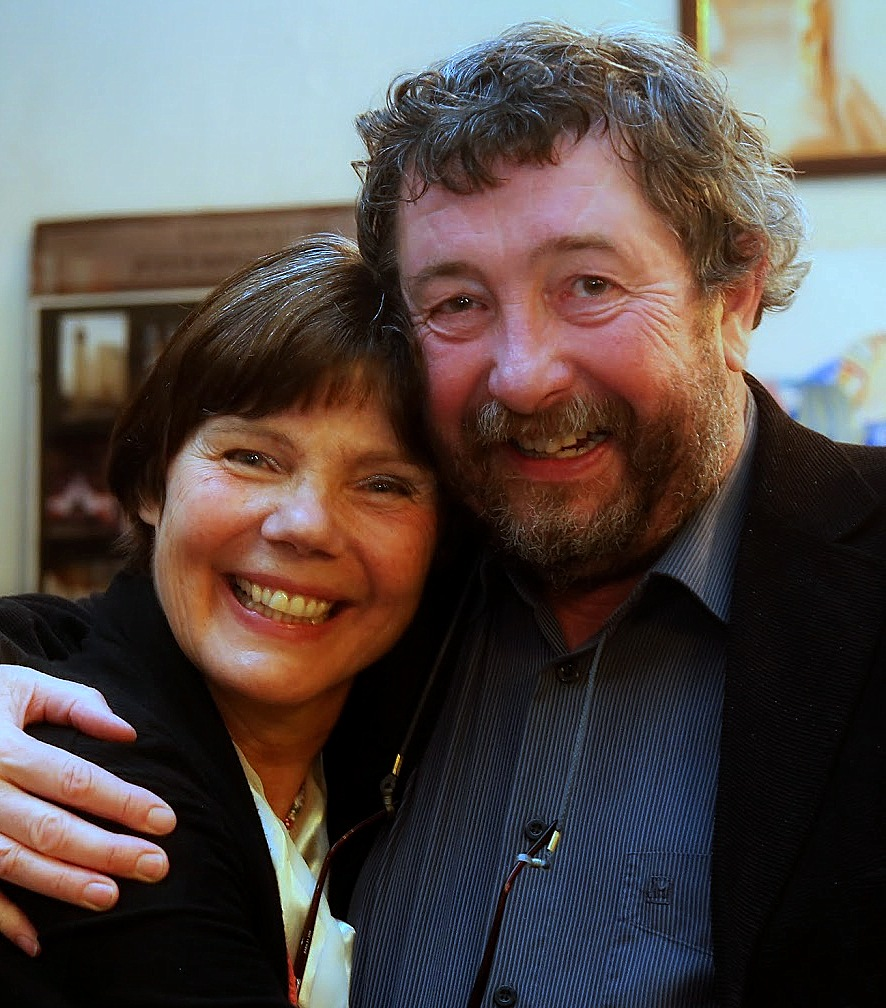
Miklós Sugár and his wife, Zsuzsánna Mindszenty, 2014

Miklós Sugár (born 2 July 1952) is a Hungarian conductor, music educator, and composer.

== Life ==
Sugár is the son of the composer Rezső Sugár and he was born in Budapest. Sugár studied at the Ferenc Liszt Academy of Music with Kórodi Andrásné and Emilnél Petrovich.

After completing his studies, he took a position from 1978 to 1984 as the Army Art Ensemble Symphony Orchestra conductor. In 1978 he also took a position teaching at the Theater and Film Academy in Budapest, where he worked until 1991. From 1984 to 1988 he led the Békéscsabai Symphony Orchestra, and from 1988 to 1990 worked as an editor for Hungarian Radio's music department. In 1991 he took the position of National Philharmonic's manager. The same year, he was a co-founder of EAR, a contemporary electro-acoustic ensemble. Between 1991 and 1999, he worked with the Alba Regia Symphony Orchestra.

From 1979 to 1987 Sugár was a member of the Hungarian Composers 'Association of Young Composers' Group, and from 1983 to 1987 served as secretary to the organization.

== Private life ==
He is married to musicologist Zsuzsánna Mindszenty and they have three adult daughters.

== Honors and awards ==
- 1981, scholarship from the Albert Szirmai Foundation
- 1984–85, Kodály scholarship
- 1985, Budapest Spring Festival, 3rd International Zeneszerzőverseny finishers
- 1989, Arezzo Choral Competition Special Prize-winning composer
- 1991, Hungarian Radio KÓTA művéért's Gloria Award.
- 1991–92, Soros Fellow
- 1991, John von Neumann Society for Competition of Electroacoustic (3 awards)
- 1992, Ferenc Erkel Prize
- 1993, Lanczos-Szekfu Foundation honoree
- 1989, 1990 and 1994, Les Atelier UPIC scholarship, Paris
- 1999, Akademie der Künste Berlin Scholarshi
- 2001, Vox-electronica award as a member of EAR

== Discography ==
Sugár's works have been recorded and issued on media including:

- Mosaic, Musica agile, Dissolves, Ballad, Chorea, Rencontres, 1988 Hungaroton SLPX 12970 LP
- Concert for Cimbalom, 1993 Preludio PRECD 9304 CD
- Fanfár / Fanfare, 1995 ARITMIA Hungaroton HCD 31 624 CD
- Contemporary Hungarian music for trumpet and harp, 1995 Hungaroton HCD 31 734 CD
- Vizek völgyek harangok / Water, valley, bells, 1997 MR HEAR Studio CD
- Magyar hangtájak / Hungarian Soundscapes, Álmok / Dreams – részletek / excerpts, 1997 MR Rt HEAR Studio CD
- EAR movements: Short story, Fluctus, Models, Percupicsy, Iris, 1999 Hungaroton HCD 31 788 CD
- Lied, Pater noster, 1999 Hungaroton HCD 31 840 CD
- Dreams, 2000 Hungaroton HCD 31 868 CD
- Trio miniatures, 2001 Hungaroton HCD 31 997 CD
- After storm, Songs on verses by Béla Kondor, Luxatio, Three songs on Poems by Morgenstern, No. 2, French songs on Poems by S. Beckett, Miniatures, 2003 Hungaroton HCD 32 180
- Adoramus, Exultate, 2004 Allegro Thaler MZA-069
- Fanfár, 2004 Hungaroton HCD 32251
- Mosaic, Musica agile, Dissolves, Réminiscences, Cloud variations, Ballad, Chorea, Rencontres, 2005 Hungaroton HCD 32326
- Art Duo No. 2, 2005 Hungaroton HCD 32347
- Pages dessinées, Birds of the crater, 2006 Hungaroton HCD 32449
