= Rezső Sugár =

Hungarian composer

Rezső Sugár (9 October 1919 – 22 September 1988) was a Hungarian composer.

Rezső Sugár was born in Budapest. He studied musical composition under Zoltán Kodály at the Franz Liszt Academy of Music from 1937 to 1942. He was a teacher of composition at the Béla Bartók Secondary School of Music from 1949 to 1968 and at the Franz Liszt Academy of Music from 1968 to 1979.

His recorded compositions include the oratorios Hunyadi and Savonarola, the Quartet for Strings and Piano, and the Partita for String Orchestra.

He was a winner of the Kossuth Prize in 1954 and was the father of the composer and conductor Miklós Sugár.
