= Sugar Sugar (company) =

Confectionery manufacturer and retailer

Sugar Sugar, Inc.
- Type: Private
- Industry: Confectionery
- Founded: 2003
- Headquarters: Maitland, Florida
- Website: handmadelollies.com

Sugar Sugar, Inc. is a confectionery manufacturer and retailer located in Orlando, Florida.

The company is most famous for their handmade hard candy and incredibly large novelty lollipops weighing up to 2 pounds each. One of their specialties is a personalized candy where they form names, words, and logos by hand within each bite-sized piece of hard candy. The style of candymaking is very similar to Great Britain's "stick of rock" or Australia's "lollies" and often called just Rock or Lolly. Sugar-free lollies are also made using Splenda brand sucralose.

They make a variety of other confections, including peanut brittle, cashew brittle, candy apples, caramel apples, and an assortment of chocolate dipped sweets.

First airing in 2006, Sugar Sugar has been featured two of the Food Network's Unwrapped episodes, "Candy Cravings" and "Couch Potato."

Sugar Sugar's exhibition factory is located inside Universal Studios Florida theme park in the San Francisco/Amity themed area.
