= Ndoola language =

Bantoid language spoken in Nigeria

Ndoola
- Ndoro
- Native to: Nigeria
- Region: Taraba State
- Ethnicity: Ndola people
- Native speakers: (63,000 cited 2000)
- Language family: Niger–Congo?: Atlantic–Congo; Benue–Congo; Mambiloid?; Ndoro–Fam; Ndoola

Language codes
- ISO 639-3: ndr
- Glottolog: ndoo1241

Ndoola (Ndoro) or Njoyamɛ in Cameroon is a Bantoid language of Nigeria, with several thousand speakers in Cameroon. It is either among or related to the Mambiloid languages.

== Phonology ==
Consonants
	Labial	Alveolar	Palatal	Velar		Glottal
	Labial	Alveolar	Palatal	oral	labialised	Glottal
Plosive	p b	t d	tʃ dʒ	k g	kʷ gʷ	ʔ
Prenasalized	ᵐb	ⁿd	ⁿdʒ	ᵑg	ᵑgʷ	
Fricative	f v	s z	ʃ			h
Nasal	m	n	ɲ	ŋ	ŋʷ	
Approximant	w	l, r	ʎ, j			

Vowels
	Front	Central	Back
High	i	ɨ	u uː
Mid-high	e eː	ə	o oː
Mid-low	ɛ ɛː		ɔ
Low		a aː	

Ndoro also has five tones; high, mid, low, falling, and rising.

== Morphology ==
Ndoola nouns can have both prefixes and suffixes attached to them, although not for all nouns. Most nouns do not mark the plural, and the ones that do most commonly indicate plurality using a suffix.

== Pronouns ==
	sing.	plur.
1st	nímə̀	nájā
2nd	níbâ	nɨnjīnā
3rd	wūnī	nɛ́bū
