= Luo language (Cameroon) =

Extinct language of Cameroon

Luo
- Kasabe
- Native to: Cameroon
- Region: Atta, Mambila, Nyalang
- Extinct: November 5, 1995, with the death of Bogon
- Language family: Niger–Congo?: Atlantic–Congo; Benue–Congo; Mambiloid; Mambila–Konja ?; Luo

Language codes
- ISO 639-3: luw
- Glottolog: luoc1235
- ELP: Luo

The Luo language (Kasabe) is an extinct language of Cameroon, formerly spoken around Mambila in the Nyalang area, spoken in a section of the Atta region of Cameroon. The last speaker, a man named Bogon, died on 5 November 1995; he was said to be "well over" 100 years old at the time of his death. One of Bogon's sisters survived him but she reportedly did not know the language.

== Bibliography ==
- Connell, B. (1995). Voices from the Grave: Dying languages and the complexity of the Mambiloid group. Paper presented at the 25th Colloquium on African Languages and Linguistics, Leiden.
