= Sugah =

Sugah سوگاه
- Village
- Location within Iran
- Coordinates: 36°34′26″N 50°14′32″E
- Country: Iran
- Province: Qazvin
- County: Qazvin
- Bakhsh: Alamut-e Gharbi
- Rural District: Rudbar-e Shahrestan

Population (2006)
  - Total: 197
- Time zone: UTC+3:30 (IRST)
  - Summer (DST): UTC+4:30 (IRDT)

Sugah (Persian: سوگاه, also Romanized as Sūgāh and Sūgā) is a village in Rudbar-e Shahrestan Rural District, Alamut-e Gharbi District, Qazvin County, Qazvin Province, Iran. At the 2006 census, its population was 197, in 45 families.
