= Wawa language =

Language

Wawa
- Native to: Cameroon
- Region: Adamawa Province, Mayo-Banyo Division, Bankim Subdivision, west of Banyo, thirteen villages
- Native speakers: (3,000 cited 1991)
- Language family: Niger–Congo?: Atlantic–Congo; Benue–Congo; Mambiloid; Mambila–Konja; Mambila–Vute; Tep–Vute; Vute; Wawa
- Dialects: Gandua

Language codes
- ISO 639-3: www
- Glottolog: wawa1246
- ELP: Wawa

Wawa is a Mambiloid language spoken in a region of Cameroon and just inside bordering Nigeria used by about 3,000 people in three main dialects.

All speakers are bilingual, often in Fulfulde.
