= Bart Bonte =

Independent game developer

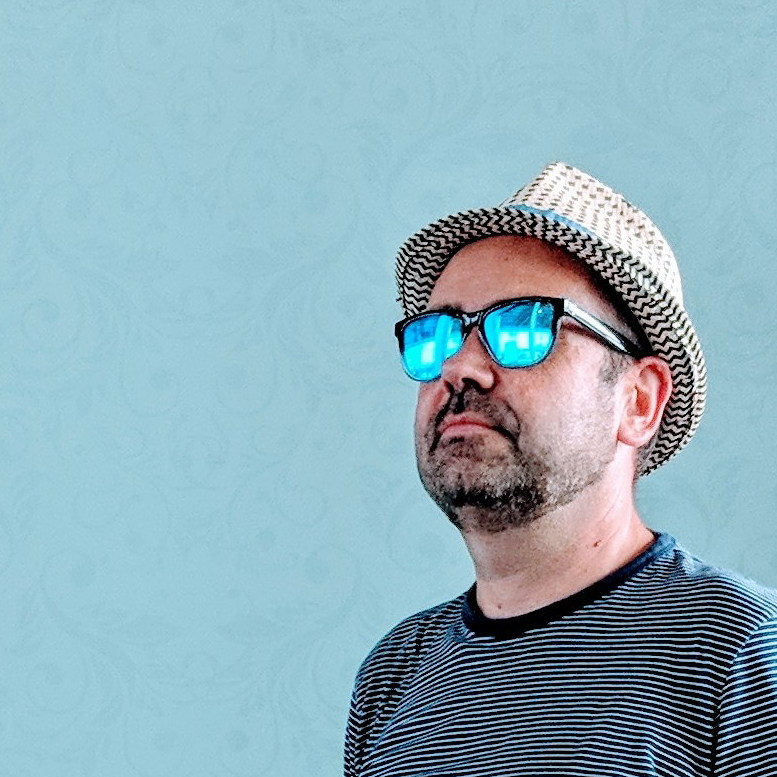

Bart Bonte is a Belgian independent game developer most well-known for his abstract puzzle games, among them Factory Balls (2007), Sugar, Sugar (2011), and Yellow (2017). Some of the ideas he has built games around include rubber ducks, a CRT monitor in a field, and his daughter's teddy bear. He releases his games under the moniker bontegames. Most of his games are made in Adobe Flash.

== Biography ==
Bonte grew up in Belgium, and enjoyed playing games on his Commodore Amiga as a kid. From that time forward, Bonte knew he wanted to be a game developer, and in 2005, he released his first game, an escape room made in Adobe Flash. By 2017, he had developed and released over 50 games.

On 3 May 2021, Bonte released The Bart Bonte collection on Steam and Itch.io, which includes 28 of his flash games "carefully packaged and remastered".
