= Robert Bont =

Member of the Parliament of England

Robert Bont, was an English Member of Parliament.

He was a Member (MP) of the Parliament of England for Salisbury in 1360, 1361, 1363 and 1372.
