= Dakoid languages =

Bantoid language branch of Nigeria

Dakoid
- Geographic distribution: Nigeria
- Linguistic classification: Niger–Congo?: Atlantic–Congo; Volta-Congo; Benue–Congo; Bantoid; Northern Bantoid; Dakoid
- Subdivisions: (unclear)

Language codes
- Glottolog: dako1256
- The Dakoid languages shown within Nigeria

The Dakoid languages are a branch of the Northern Bantoid languages spoken in Taraba and Adamawa states of eastern Nigeria.

== Languages ==
- Dakoid
  - Donga (Dong)
  - Gãã (Tiba)
  - Daka–Taram
    - Taram
    - Daka (a dialect cluster of Dirim, Samba, Lamja, Dengsa, and Tola).

== Classification ==
Greenberg placed Samba Daka (Daka) within his Adamawa proposal, as group G3, but Bennett (1983) demonstrated to general satisfaction that it is a Benue–Congo language, though its placement within Benue–Congo is disputed. Blench (2010) considers it to be Benue–Congo. Boyd (ms), however, considers Daka an isolate branch within Niger–Congo (Blench 2008).

Dong (Donga), though clearly Niger–Congo, is difficult to classify. There is no published data on Gaa (Tiba), and Taram (listed as a dialect of Daka by Ethnologue) is only known from data collected in 1931 (Blench 2008).

== Names and locations ==
Below is a list of language names, populations, and locations from Blench (2019).

Language	Cluster	Dialects	Alternate spellings	Own name for language	Endonym(s)	Speakers	Location(s)
Dirim		It may not actually be separate from Samba Daka (q.v.)			Daka	9,000 (CAPRO, 1992)	Taraba State, Bali LGA, Garba Chede area
Lamja-Deŋsa-Tola cluster		Dialects are mutually intelligible. Likely not distinct enough from the Samba Daka cluster to be a separate language (q.v.).			Lamjavu, Deŋsavu, Tolavu	There are 13 villages of Lamja and Deŋsa. The central town of the Lamja is Ganglamja. The Deŋsa live south of the Lamja.	Taraba State, Mayo Belwa LGAs
Samba Daka cluster	Samba Daka	These dialects may form a dialect or language cluster together with Lamja and Taram (q.v.). Dirim could another dialect, or perhaps just a name for the Samba Daka.	Chamba–Daka, Samba, Chamba, Tchamba, Tsamba, Jama, Daka	Sama Mum	Samabu	66,000 (1952); 60,000 (1982 SIL); more than 100,000 (1990)	Taraba State, Ganye, Jalingo, Bali, Zing, and Mayo Belwa LGAs
Samba Daka	Samba Daka						
Samba Jangani	Samba Daka						
Samba Nnakenyare	Samba Daka						
Samba of Mapeo	Samba Daka						
Dong						ca. 20,000	Taraba State, Zing and Mayo Belwa LGAs. At least six villages
Gaa						<5000 (1987 Blench)	Adamawa State: Ganye LGA: Tiba Plateau
