= Mambila language =

Mambiloid language of Nigeria and Cameroon

Mambila
- Region: Nigeria and Cameroon
- Native speakers: (130,000 cited 1993)
- Language family: Niger–Congo?: Atlantic–Congo; Benue–Congo; Bantoid; Northern Bantoid; Mambiloid; Mambila–Konja; Mambila–Vute; Mambila

Language codes
- ISO 639-3: Either: mzk – Nigerian Mambila mcu – Camerounian Mambila
- Glottolog: nige1255 Nigeria came1252 Cameroon

Mambila is a dialect chain stretching across Nigeria and Cameroon. It is one of the Mambiloid languages, a branch of Benue–Congo.

Notable dialects are Barup, Bang, Dorofi, Gembu, Hainari, Kabri, Mayo Ndaga, Mbamnga, Tamien, Warwar (in Nigeria); Sunu Torbi (Torbi), Ju Naare (Gembu), and in Cameroon, Ju Ba and Langa. Mambila goes by numerous names, which, besides the dialectical names, include Bea, Ble, Juli, Lagubi, Nor, Nor Tagbo, Tongbo, and the spellings Mabila, Mambere, Mambilla.

Tep is generally considered a dialect by those in Tep and by speakers of other varieties of Mambila, but though Tep speakers are ethnically Mambila, their speech is not intelligible to other varieties. In terms of linguistic classification it may be more accurate to call it a different Mambiloid language.

Blacksmiths among the Mambila once spoke Somyev, a related Mambiloid language, though this is nearly extinct.

== Phonology ==
=== Vowels ===
	Front	Central	Back	
Close	i	ɨ	ɯ	u
Close-mid	e		o	
Open-mid	ɛ		ɔ	
Open		a		

- /i/ can also be heard as [ɪ] in different positions.

There is an occurrence of fricativized close vowel combinations when preceded by a number of consonants. An alveolo-palatal fricative with vowels /i, ɨ/ as [ʑ͜i, ʑ͜ɨ], and a labio-dental sound with /ɯ/ as [v͜ɯ]. The only consonants /b, f, t, d, n, l, ʃ, k/ are heard with the fricativized vowels [bʑ, ʃʑ, fv, tv, dv, nv, lv, kv].

=== Consonants ===
		Labial	Alveolar	Postalv./ Palatal	Velar		Glottal
		Labial	Alveolar	Postalv./ Palatal	plain	lab.	Glottal
Nasal		m	n	ɲ	ŋ	ŋʷ	
Stop	voiceless	p	t		k	kʷ	
Stop	voiced	b	d		g	ɡʷ	
Stop	prenasal vl.	ᵐp	ⁿt		ᵑk	ᵑkʷ	
Stop	prenasal vd.	ᵐb	ⁿd		ᵑɡ	ᵑɡʷ	
Affricate	voiceless		t͡s	t͡ʃ			
Affricate	voiced		d͡z	d͡ʒ			
Affricate	prenasal vl.		ⁿt͡s				
Affricate	prenasal vd.		ⁿd͡z	ⁿd͡ʒ			
Fricative	voiceless	f	s	ʃ	(x)		h
Fricative	voiced	v					
Fricative	prenasal vl.	ᶬf	ⁿs				
Fricative	prenasal vd.	ᶬv	ⁿz				
Trill			(r)				
Tap			ɺ				
Approximant	lateral		l				
Approximant	plain			j		w	

- /d/ can have allophones of [ɾ, r, ɺ], among different speakers. /k/ can have an allophone of [x] when occurring in intervocalic or post-vocalic positions.
