= Vute language =

Mambiloid language of Cameroon

Vute
- Native to: Cameroon
- Native speakers: (21,000 cited 1997)
- Language family: Niger–Congo?: Atlantic–Congo; Benue–Congo; Mambiloid; Mambila–Konja; Mambila–Vute; Tep–Vute; Vute languages; Vute

Language codes
- ISO 639-3: vut
- Glottolog: vute1244

Vute is a Mambiloid language of Cameroon and Gabon, with a thousand speakers in Nigeria. The orthography was standardized on March 9, 1979. Noted dialect clusters are eastern, central, and Doume.

== Phonology ==
=== Consonants ===
Consonants in Vute are numerous and include pulmonic and implosive airstreams. Labialization is phonemic in many consonants, some of which is dialectal.

Consonants of Vute
		Labial		Dental/ Alveolar		Post- alveolar		Palatal	Velar		Labial– velar	Glottal	
		plain	lab. (Note: Only vowels /i/ /e/ /a/ may follow a labialized consonant.)	plain	lab.	plain	lab.	Palatal	plain	lab.	Labial– velar	plain	lab.
Nasal		m ⟨m⟩	mʷ ⟨mw⟩	n ⟨n⟩				ɲ ⟨ny⟩	ŋ ⟨ŋ⟩				
Implosive		ɓ ⟨ɓ⟩	ɓʷ ⟨ɓw⟩	ɗ ⟨ɗ⟩	ɗʷ ⟨ɗw⟩ (Note: Doume dialect only.)								
Plosive/ Affricate	voiceless	p ⟨p⟩		t ⟨t⟩		t͡ʃ ⟨c⟩	t͡ʃʷ ⟨cw⟩ (Note: Doume and eastern dialects only.)		k ⟨k⟩	kʷ ⟨kw⟩	k͡p ⟨kp⟩		
Plosive/ Affricate	voiced	b (Note: becomes a fricative [β] intervocalically. [ŋgáb] "they" -> [ŋgáβè] "their")⟨b⟩		d ⟨d⟩		d͡ʒ ⟨j⟩	d͡ʒʷ ⟨jw⟩		g (Note: becomes a fricative [ɣ] intervocalically. [ɡè nɨ] "to carry" -> [ɲdʒɨ̀ɨ̀ɣɨ̀βɨ̀] "of leprosy")⟨g⟩	gʷ ⟨gw⟩	ɡ͡b ⟨gb⟩		
Plosive/ Affricate	prenasalized	ᵐb ⟨mb⟩		ⁿd ⟨nd⟩	ⁿdʷ ⟨ndw⟩	ⁿd͡ʒ ⟨nj⟩ (Note: Low frequency)			ᵑg ⟨ŋg⟩	ᵑgʷ ⟨ŋgw⟩	ᵑᵐɡ͡b ⟨mgb⟩		
Fricative	voiceless	f ⟨f⟩	fʷ ⟨fw⟩	s ⟨s⟩	sʷ ⟨sw⟩							h ⟨h⟩	hʷ ⟨hw⟩ (Note: Central dialects only)
Fricative	voiced	v ⟨v⟩											
Fricative	prenasalized	ᶬv ⟨mv⟩											
Rhotic				(ɾ~r) (Note: initially: [leè] "wall; intervocalically: [tòɾò] "papaya'; finally: [bɨ́r] "oil palm tree")									
Approximant				l ⟨l⟩				j ⟨y⟩			w ⟨w⟩		

=== Tones ===
There are more phonemic tones than are marked in orthography, such as mid-high rising tone and mid tone being both unmarked ⟨a⟩ for example. Phonologically conditioned downstep is unmarked.

Tone Category	IPA	Orthography	Example	Gloss
high tone	˦	á, áá	tím	blood
mid tone	˧	a, aa	məb	louse
low tone	˨	à, àà	tɨ̀mnɨ	to drown
mid-high	˧˥	a, aá	tɨm	antelope
low-high*	˩˥	à	ɓùn	grass
high-low	˥˩	â, áà	bɨ̂ŋ	round, complete
high-mid	˥˧	â, áa	mîn	good
high-low-high	˥˩˦	âá	sîím	rainy season

*Only in eastern dialects, on short vowels. All other dialects merge this class with low tone.

=== Vowels ===
Oral		Nasal	
Long	Short	Long	Short
[iː] ii	[i~ɪ] i	[ĩː] i̧i̧	[ĩ] i̧
[eː] ee	[e~ɛ] e	[ɛ̃ː] ȩȩ	[ɛ̃] ȩ
[ɨː] ɨɨ	[ɨ] ɨ	[ɨ̃ː] ɨ̧ɨ̧	[ɨ̃] ɨ̧
[əː] əə	[ə] ə	[ə̃ː] ə̧ə̧	[ə̃] ə̧
[aː] aa	[a] a	[ãː] a̧a̧	[ã] a̧
[uː] uu	[u~ʊ] u	[ũː] u̧u̧	[ũ] u̧
[oː] oo	[o~ɔ] o	[õː] o̧o̧	[õ] o̧
[ɔː] ɔɔ	[ɔ] ɔ	[ɔ̃ː] ɔ̧ɔ̧	[ɔ̃] ɔ̧
[ei] ei		[ẽĩ] ȩi̧	
[ai] ai		[ãĩ] a̧i̧	
[ɨi] ɨi		[ɨ̃ĩ] ɨ̧i̧	
[əi] əi		[ə̃ĩ] ə̧i̧	
[oi] oi		[õĩ] o̧i̧	
