= Kwanja language =

Mambiloid language spoken in Cameroon

Kwanja
- Konja
- Native to: Cameroon
- Native speakers: 10,000 (2011)
- Language family: Niger–Congo?: Atlantic–Congo; Benue–Congo; Mambiloid; Mambila–Konja; Kwanja
- Dialects: Njanga

Language codes
- ISO 639-3: knp
- Glottolog: konj1252
- ELP: Nyanjang

Kwanja (Konja) is a Mambiloid language of Cameroon. Njanga (Nyanjang) is a distinct dialect.
