= Bantoid languages =

Language family

Bantoid
- Geographic distribution: Sub-Saharan Africa, but not farther west than Nigeria
- Linguistic classification: Niger–Congo?: Atlantic–Congo; Volta–Congo; Benue–Congo; Bantoid–Cross; Bantoid
- Proto-language: Proto-Bantoid
- Subdivisions: Northern Bantoid; Southern Bantoid

Language codes
- Glottolog: bant1294
- The Bantoid languages shown within the Niger–Congo language family. Non-Bantoid languages are greyscale.

Bantoid is a major branch of the Benue–Congo language family. It consists of the Northern Bantoid languages and the Southern Bantoid languages, a division which also includes the Bantu languages that constitute the overwhelming majority and after which Bantoid is named.

== History ==
The term "Bantoid" was first used by Krause in 1895 for languages that showed resemblances in vocabulary to Bantu. Joseph Greenberg, in his 1963 The Languages of Africa, defined Bantoid as the group to which Bantu belongs together with its closest relatives; this is the sense in which the term is still used today.

However, according to Roger Blench, the Bantoid languages probably do not actually form a coherent group.

== Internal classification ==
A proposal that divided Bantoid into North Bantoid and South Bantoid was introduced by Williamson. In this proposal, the Mambiloid and Dakoid languages (and later Tikar) are grouped together as North Bantoid, while everything else Bantoid is subsumed under South Bantoid; Ethnologue uses this classification.

The phylogenetic unity of the North Bantoid group is sometimes thought to be questionable, and the Dakoid languages are often now placed outside Bantoid. But the work did establish Southern Bantoid as a valid genetic unit. Southern Bantoid includes the well known and numerous Bantu languages.

The Bantoid branches of Nigeria and Cameroon
