= Languages of Guyana =

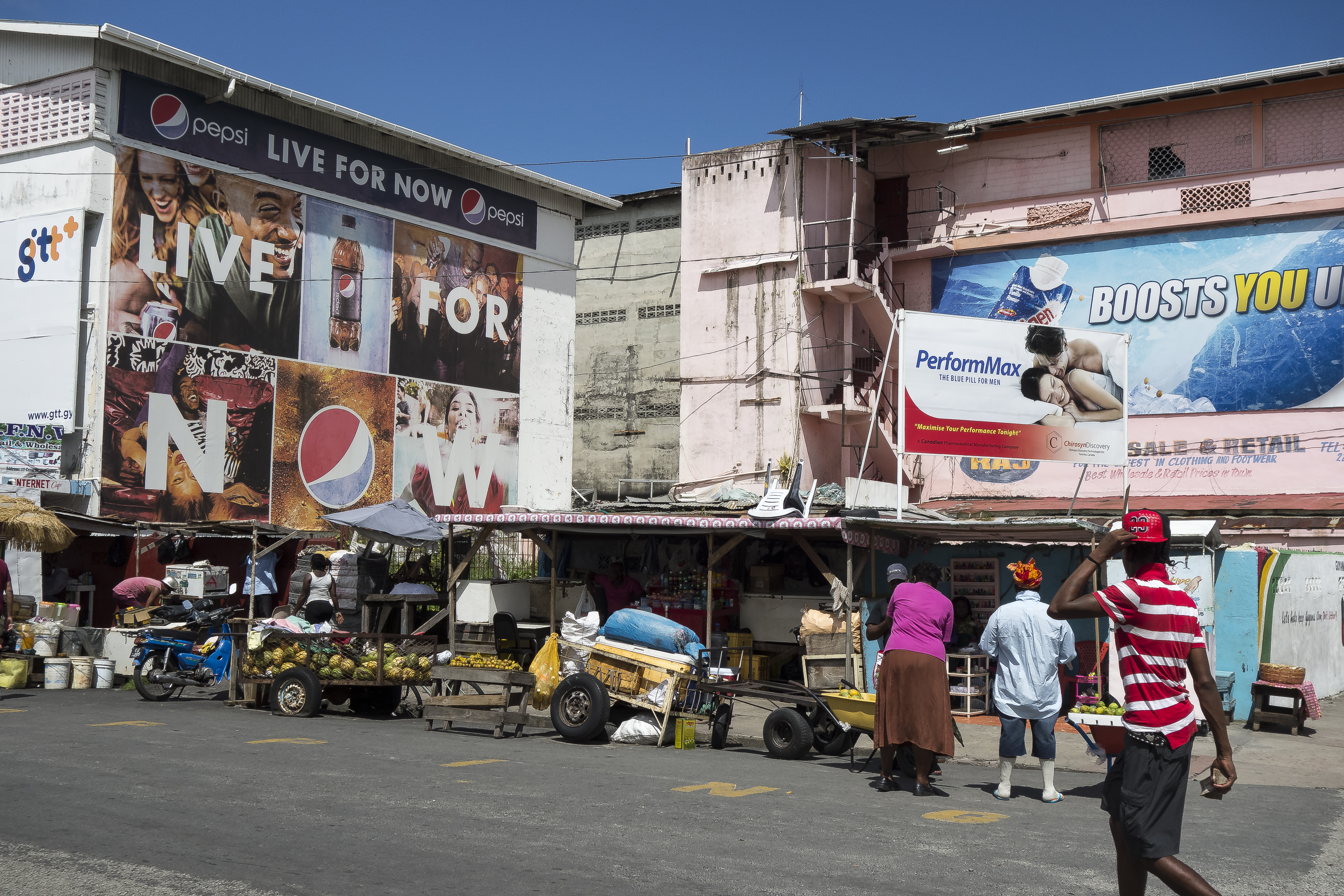
- Signs in Georgetown with text in English
- Official: English
- Regional: Akawaio, Lokono, Atorada, Carib, Macushi, Mapidian, Patamona, Pemon, Waiwai, Wapishana, Warao
- Vernacular: Guyanese Creole
- Minority: Guyanese Hindustani, Spanish, Portuguese, French, Dutch, Tamil, Chinese
- Signed: Guyanese Sign Language, South Rupununi Sign Language
- Keyboard layout: QWERTY

English is the official language of Guyana, which is the only South American country with English as the official language.

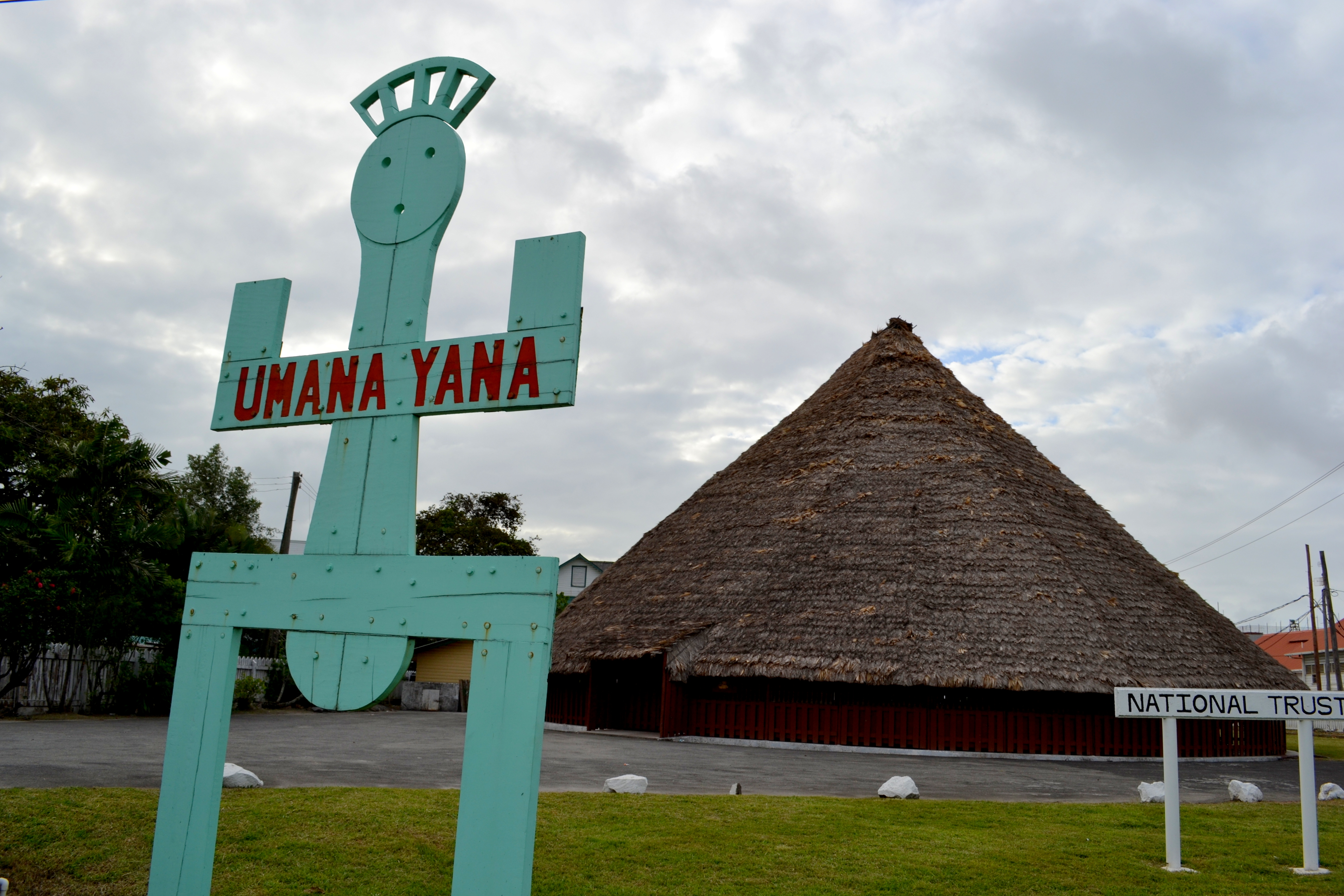
The Umana Yana in Georgetown; the name means "Meeting place of the people" in Waiwai.

Guyanese Creole (an English-based creole) is widely spoken in Guyana.

Guyanese Hindustani is retained and spoken by some Indo-Guyanese for cultural and religious reasons. Guyanese Bhojpuri may be used by older generations, folk songs, or in a limited way at home, while standard Hindi is used in religious service, writing, and passively through the consumption of Hindi film exports from India. Tamil was once spoken by a segment of the Indo-Guyanese community, although its usage has declined over generations, and it remains mostly in religious and cultural contexts.

A number of Amerindian languages are also spoken by a minority of the population. These include Cariban languages such as Macushi, Akawaio and Wai-Wai; and Arawakan languages such as Lokono and Wapishana.
