= Aroaqui language =

Extinct Arawakan language of Brazil

Aroaqui
- Aroaki
- Native to: Brazil
- Region: Lower Rio Negro
- Era: attested 1832
- Language family: Arawakan: Northern; Pidjanan; Aroaqui–Parawana; Aroaqui

Language codes
- ISO 639-3: None (mis)
- Glottolog: aroa1234

Aroaqui (Aroaki) is an extinct Arawakan language of Brazil that was spoken in the lower Rio Negro region, probably on the banks of the Cuieiras River. Some Aroaqui groups were also located around the mouth of the Amazon River near Macapá.

Aroaqui and Parawana are closely related, and may be the same language.

== Vocabulary ==
Aroaqui vocabulary (flora, fauna and cultural artifacts) collected by Johann Natterer (1832) in Airão:

English	Aroaqui
giant armadillo	aʃana
long-nosed armadillo	kabau
South American tapir	waʃapi
white-lipped peccary	uʃabɨ
collared peccary	biiʃa
deer	botʃu
jaguar	itanamale
cougar	witʃalaule (witʃaule 'red')
dog	juba
manatee	habɨna
duck	uluma
Columbidae	jakokoa
Cracidae	pawi
chicken	paikula
red-and-green macaw	hana
blue-and-yellow macaw	kaliba
Psittacidae	huaru
Psophia	kolüma
Tinamous	mami
alligator	atule
Chelonoidis	khooli
sepia-capped flycatcher	koati
fish	wöni
piraíba	polauiwa
redtail catfish	dumma
Pseudoplatystoma	kulötʃi
pirarucu	metauü
yam (vegetable)	dɨtʃu
manioc	kanöti
boiled and grounded manioc leaves (see maniva)	kabünakadi
mbeju	tʃüi
tapioca	haiwei
grass	kabatʃai
corn	kawitʃi
banana	a(u)waʃi
tobacco	lɨbaʃada / pɨtuma(t)ʃe (< nheengatu)
arch	obɨduwai
arrow	no(-)bɨne
club (weapon)	khoipeda
witch	jadama
acoustic horn	no(-)pole
canoe	kanoa
cauim	jalakö
demon	maiʃé
God + Mary, mother of Jesus	Kawale + Menétʃu
knife	malia
axe	tauwai
jug	janawi
Mouriri	oaʃanai
net	amaka
