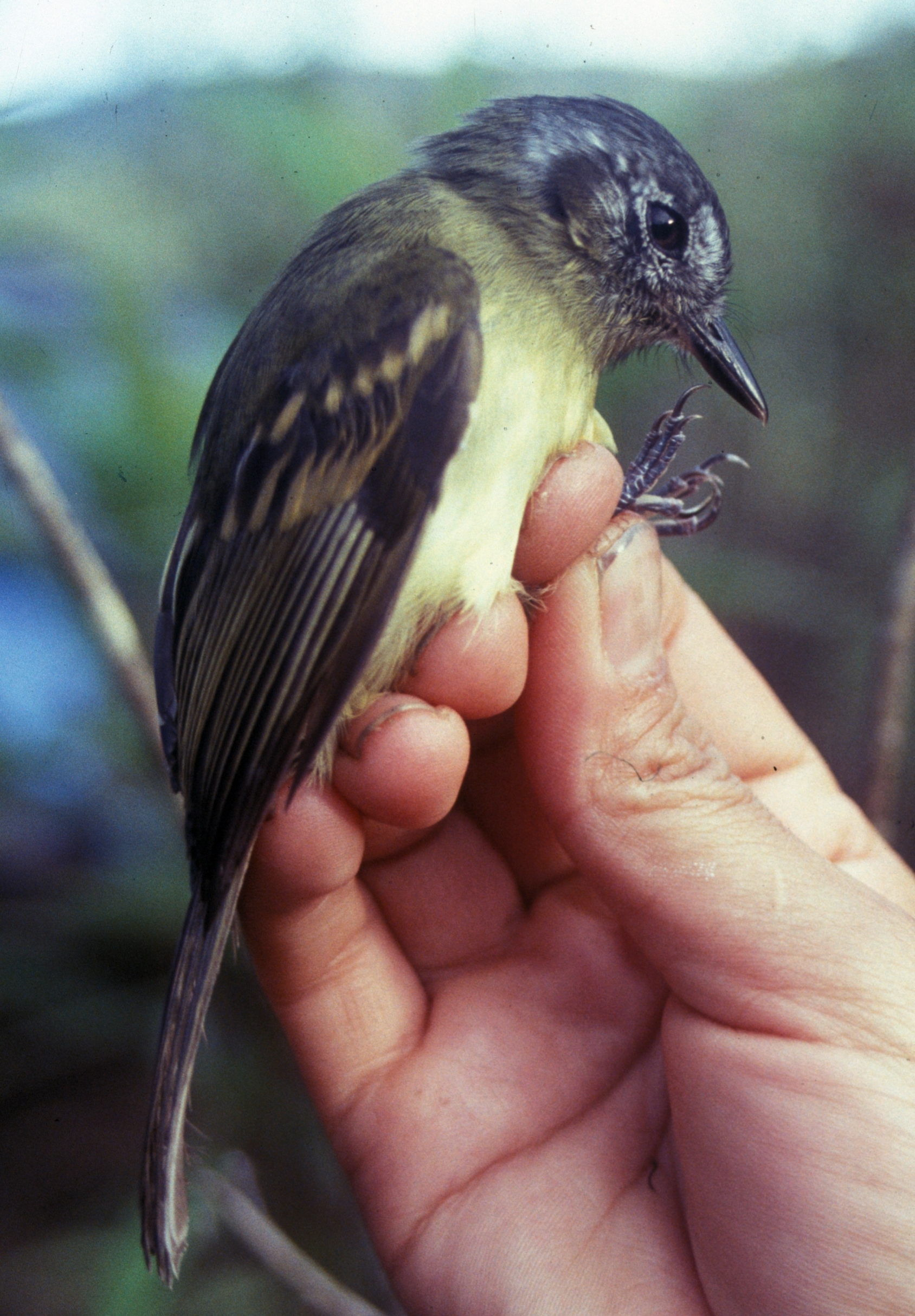

Conservation status
- Least Concern (IUCN 3.1)

- Least Concern (IUCN 3.1)

Scientific classification
- Kingdom: Animalia
- Phylum: Chordata
- Class: Aves
- Order: Passeriformes
- Family: Tyrannidae
- Genus: Leptopogon
- Species: L. superciliaris

Binomial name
- Leptopogon superciliaris Tschudi, 1844

= Slaty-capped flycatcher =

Species of bird

The slaty-capped flycatcher (Leptopogon superciliaris) is a small passerine bird in the tyrant flycatcher family. It is found from Costa Rica south to Bolivia and east to Venezuela and Trinidad.

== Taxonomy and systematics ==
The slaty-capped flycatcher's taxonomy is unsettled. The International Ornithological Committee (IOC) assigns it two subspecies, the nominate L. s. superciliaris (Tschudi, 1844) and L. s. albiventer (Hellmayr, 1918). The Clements taxonomy assigns a third, L. s. transandinus, that the IOC includes within the nominate. BirdLife International's Handbook of the Birds of the World (HBW) treats albiventer as a separate species, the white-bellied flycatcher, leaving the slaty-capped as a monotypic species. Several other subspecies have been suggested but not recognized.

This article follows the IOC one species, two subspecies model.

== Description ==
The slaty-capped flycatcher is 13 to 14 cm (5.1 to 5.5 in) long and weighs 9.5 to 14.8 g (0.34 to 0.52 oz). The sexes have the same plumage. Both subspecies show much plumage variation within them. Adults of the nominate subspecies have a slaty gray crown. They have white lores, a thin white supercilium, and a wide dusky to black crescent around the back of the otherwise mottled whitish face. Their back and rump are dark olive. Their wings are dusky with yellow-green edges on the flight feathers. Their wing coverts are dusky with whitish or pale yellow to rich cinnamon-buff tips that show as two wing bars. Their tail is dusky olive. Their throat is mottled grayish, their breast yellow with heavy but thin grayish olive streaking, and the rest of their underparts plain pale yellow. They have a medium grayish brown to dark brown iris, a black bill with sometimes a pale orange or pinkish base to the mandible, and dark gray legs and feet. Subspecies L. s. albiventer has grayish olive upperparts, pale yellow wing bars, and whitish to pale yellowish white underparts with gray (not grayish olive) markings on the breast. It has a pale brown to grayish brown iris, a black bill with sometimes a pinkish base to the mandible, and gray to pale blue-gray legs and feet.

== Distribution and habitat ==
The slaty-capped flycatcher has a disjunct distribution. The nominate subspecies is found on the Caribbean and Pacific slopes of Costa Rica and western Panama, in Panama's Darién Province, on Trinidad, in the Venezuelan Coastal Range, in the Serranía del Perijá on the Venezuela-Colombia border, on both the eastern and western slopes of the Andes from western Venezuela through Colombia and Ecuador slightly into Peru, and on the eastern slope in Peru south to Cuzco Department. (When L. s. transandinus is treated separately, it refers to birds of the Central American range and the South American range west of the Andes.) Subspecies L. s. albiventer is found on the east slope of the Andes from Cuzco south into northern Bolivia as far as western Santa Cruz Department.

The slaty-capped flycatcher inhabits humid foothill and montane evergreen forest, secondary forest, and coffee plantations in the upper topical and subtropical zones. In elevation it ranges between 500 and 1,600 m (1,600 and 5,200 ft) in Costa Rica and Panama, between 400 and 2,000 m (1,300 and 6,600 ft) in Venezuela, between 500 and 2,100 m (1,600 and 6,900 ft) in Colombia, between 200 and 1,500 m (700 and 4,900 ft) in western Ecuador, between 600 and 1,500 m (2,000 and 4,900 ft) in eastern Ecuador, and between 600 and 2,000 m (2,000 and 6,600 ft) in Peru.

== Behavior ==
=== Movement ===
The slaty-capped flycatcher is mostly a year-round resident but some are thought to move to slightly lower elevations during the local winter.

=== Feeding ===
The slaty-capped flycatcher mostly feeds on arthropods and also includes small fruits and berries in its diet. It forages from the forest's middle level to the subcanopy. It sits erect on a perch and mostly hover-gleans or snatches fruit and insects from leaves in short sallies from it, and less often from branches and twigs. It typically forages singly or in pairs and often joins mixed-species feeding flocks.

=== Breeding ===
The slaty-capped flycatcher's breeding season has not been fully defined but is known to vary geographically. In the north it is generally within the January to July span while in Peru it appears to include August to October. Its nest is ball of fibrous rootlets lined with seed down, with a side entrance. It is suspended from a tendril or root and built in a heavily shaded area, such as a rock cleft or under an earthen bank, and almost always next to or over a stream. The typical clutch is two white eggs though one clutch of three is known. The incubation period, time to fledging, and details of parental care are not known.

=== Vocalization ===
The slaty-capped flycatcher's vocalizations apparently fall into three groups. Putative subspecies L. s. transandinus has a dawn song written as "pik..teerrrueet or pik...teerrrr". It also makes a "nagging-sounding two-part call, beginning with a sharply overslurred note and ending with a rapid trill Pik-trrrr" and a "short emphatic pit". L. s. superciliaris sensu stricto's dawn song is "several short downslurred chup notes followed by an emphatic nasal pit-chew-chup or pit-chew". It also makes a "nasal double-noted whit-chew or pit-chew" and a "short nasal downslurred chup or kuk". The dawn song of L. s. albiventer "typically starts with some faint notes or rattles followed by an emphatic nasal stereotypic chew-sik-quay? or simply sik-quay?". It also makes a "nasal stuttered series of downslurred notes chewchewchewchewchew...." and "rather nasal chup calls". In all cases the dawn song typically starts in the pre-dawn and continues for a half hour or more; it is not known if this song is confined to the breeding season. The various other vocalizations are made at any time of day and apparently year-round.

== Status ==
The IUCN follows HBW taxonomy and so has separately assessed the slaty-capped (superciliaris sensu stricto) and "white-bellied" (albiventer) flycatchers. Both are stated to be of Least Concern. Both have a large range and neither population size is known. The population of superciliaris is believed to be stable and that of albiventer decreasing. No immediate threats to either have been identified. The species is considered fairly common on the Caribbean side of Costa Rica and common on the Pacific side. It is considered common in Venezuela, Colombia, and Ecuador and fairly common in Peru. It occurs in national parks and other protected areas throughout its range.
