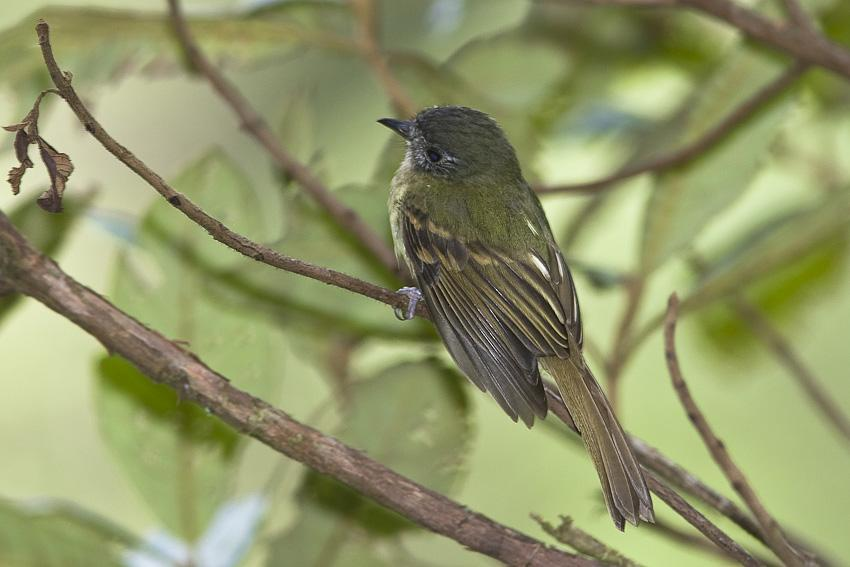

Conservation status
- Least Concern (IUCN 3.1)

Scientific classification
- Kingdom: Animalia
- Phylum: Chordata
- Class: Aves
- Order: Passeriformes
- Family: Tyrannidae
- Genus: Leptopogon
- Species: L. taczanowskii

Binomial name
- Leptopogon taczanowskii Hellmayr, 1917

= Inca flycatcher =

Species of bird

The Inca flycatcher (Leptopogon taczanowskii) is a species of bird in the family Tyrannidae, the tyrant flycatchers. It is endemic to Peru.

== Taxonomy and systematics ==
The Inca flycatcher was originally described in 1884 as Leptopogon rufipectus. Due to a conflict of this binomial with that of what is now the rufous-breasted flycatcher, by the principle of priority it was renamed Leptopogon taczanowskii in 1917.

The Inca flycatcher is monotypic. It and the rufous-breasted flycatcher (L. rufipectus) are sister species and may form a superspecies.

== Description ==
The Inca flycatcher is 12 to 13.5 cm (4.7 to 5.3 in) long; two individuals weighed 11.5 g (0.41 oz) and a third 13 g (0.46 oz). The sexes have the same plumage. Adults have a dark olive or brownish olive crown. Their face is mostly mottled blackish and whitish with a thin whitish eye-ring. Their back and rump are olive green. Their wings are dusky with olivaceous edges on the flight feathers. Their wing coverts are dusky with ochraceous tips that show as two wing bars. Their tail is warm dusky olive. Their chin and upper throat are grayish, their lower throat and breast are tawny, and their belly is pale olive yellow. They have a dark brown iris, a black bill, and dark gray legs and feet. Juveniles have wider and more rufous edges on their flight feathers than adults.

== Distribution and habitat ==
The Inca flycatcher is found on the east slope of the Peruvian Andes from the Marañón River south to Cuzco Department. It inhabits the interior and edges of humid montane forest at elevations between 1,700 and 2,700 m (5,600 and 8,900 ft).

== Behavior ==
=== Movement ===
The Inca flycatcher is a year-round resident.

=== Feeding ===
The Inca flycatcher's diet has not been detailed but is known to be mostly arthropods and also include small fruits. It forages from the forest's understory into its middle level, usually within 3 m (10 ft) of the ground. It sits erect on a perch and mostly hover-gleans or snatches fruit and insects from leaves in short sallies from it. It typically forages singly or in pairs and often joins mixed-species feeding flocks.

=== Breeding ===
Nothing is known about the Inca flycatcher's breeding biology.

=== Vocalization ===
The Inca flycatcher's song is "a squeaky skleew-di-wurdee?" and its calls "a series of 1–5 skleew...and sharp pik notes".

== Status ==
The IUCN originally in 2004 assessed the Inca flycatcher as being of Least Concern, then in 2012 as Near Threatened, and then in January 2023 again as of Least Concern. It has a large range; its estimated population of between 20,000 and 50,000 mature individuals is believed to be decreasing. "Due to its reliance on forest understory, it is susceptible to the loss, degradation and fragmentation of montane forests within the range. Deforestation is driven by forest conversion for cultivation and pasture; however overall the rate of tree cover loss is currently very low and vast areas of pristine forests remain." It is considered fairly common.
