= Pidjanan languages =

Pidjanan
- Rio Branco, Mapidianic, Wapishanan
- Geographic distribution: Brazil, Guyana, Suriname
- Linguistic classification: Arawakan: Central; Pidjanan
- Subdivisions: Mawayana; Wapishana; ? Atorad (Atorai)

Language codes
- Glottolog: mapi1253

The Pidjanan languages are a subgroup of Arawakan languages of northern South America.

== Names ==
The term Pidjanan was coined by Sérgio Meira (2019) from Wapishana pidan ‘people’, as can be seen in the ethnonyms Wa-pishana and Mao-pidian.

They are referred to as Mapidianic in Glottolog 4.3, and as Rio Branco by Nikulin & Carvalho (2019: 270).

== Languages ==
According to Meira (2019), the Pidjanan languages are:

- Pidjanan
  - Mawayana (Mapidian, Maopidian), spoken by a dozen elderly people living in ethnic Waiwai and Tiriyó villages in Brazil and Suriname
  - Wapishana, spoken by over 6,000 people on both sides of the Guyana-Brazil border
  - ? Atorad (Atorai)

Wapishana is more conservative, while Mawayana has innovated more from Proto-Pidjanan.

Ramirez's (2020) classification is:

- Pidjanan
  - Mawayana
  - Wapishanan
      - Wapishana
      - Atorai
      - Parawana
      - Aroaqui

Parawana and Aroaqui are closely related, and may be the same language.

== Proto-language ==
Proto-Pidjanan
- Reconstruction of: Pidjanan languages
- Reconstructed ancestor: Proto-Arawakan

Proto-Pidjanan has been reconstructed by Meira (2019).

=== Phonology ===
Proto-Pidjanan consonant phonemes:

	Labial	Alveolar	Palatal	Retroflex	Velar	Glottal
Plosive	*p	*t			*k	*ʔ
Implosive	*ɓ	*ɗ	*ɗʲ			
Affricate			*ʦ,*ʧ			
Fricative		*s		*ʐ		
Tap/Flap		*ɾ		*ɽ		
Nasal	*m	*n	*ɲ			
Approximant	*w		(*j)			

Proto-Pidjanan vowel phonemes:

	Front	Central	Back
Close	*i	*ɨ	*u
Open	*a		

=== Morphology ===
Proto-Pidjanan person-marking prefixes:

pronoun	Proto-Pidjanan	Mawayana	Wapishana
1S	*nu-	n-	ũ-
2S	*pɨ-	ɨ-	pɨ-
3S.MASC	*(ɾ)ɨ-	ɾɨ-	ɨ-
3S.FEM	*(ɾ)u-	u-	u-
3S.COREF	*pa-	a-	pa-
1P	*wa-	wa-	wa-
2P	*ɨ-	ɨ-	pɨ-
3P	*nV-	na-	-ĩ

Proto-Pidjanan person-marking suffixes:

pronoun	Proto-Pidjanan	Mawayana	Wapishana
1S	*-na	-na	-n, -na
2S	*-pV	-i	-p, -pa
3S.MASC	*-(ɽ)ɨ	-sɨ	-ʐɨ
3S.FEM	*-(ɽ)u		-ʐu
1P	*-wi	-wi	
2P	*-wiko	-wiko	
3P	*-nu	-nu	-ʐɨ

The functions of person markers (verbs in the -ɲɨ ‘realis’/‘present’ form).

personal marker function	Proto-Pidjanan	Mawayana	Wapishana
A and O on transitives	*nu-ɾuʔita-ɲɨ-ɽɨ ‘I hit him’	n-ɾite-sɨ	ũ-ʐuʔita-nɨ-ʐɨ
SA on active intransitives	*(ɾ)ɨ-siʔuka-ɲɨ ‘he walks’	ɾɨ-suke	ɨ-ʧiʔika-n
SO on stative intransitives	*wɨɽa(-ɲɨ)-ɽɨ ‘he is red’	usa-sɨ	ɨ-wɨʐa(-n)
arguments on adpositions	*(ɾ)ɨ-(i)tɨma ‘with him’	ɾi-ʃima	ɨ-tɨma
possessors on nouns	*nu-kɨnɨ ‘my song’	n-kɨnɨ	ũ-kɨnɨ

Nominal possession possessed and non-possessed forms.

possession marker	Proto-Pidjanan	Mawayana	Wapishana
Possession marker	*-nɨ (e.g., *wa-maɾija-nɨ ‘our knife’)	wa-maɾe-nɨ	wa-marija-n
Possession marker zero	*(ɾ)ɨ-ʦaɓa ‘his seat’	ɾiʔ-isaɓa	ɨ-taɓa
Non-possessed status	*(i)ʦaɓa-i ‘seat’	isaɓe	taɓa-i

=== Lexicon ===
Unless indicated otherwise, the Mawayana and Wapishana data below is from Sérgio Meira's field notes, as cited in Meira (2019).

Meira's Mawayana data is from Marurunau, Guyana, and his Wapishana data is from Mapuera (a village that is mostly ethnic Waiwai), Nhamundá-Mapuera Indigenous Area, Pará State, Brazil. The other sources are:

- Howard (1985-1986)
- Carlin (2006)
- Carlin (no date)
- WLP (2000)
- Silva, Silva & Oliveira (2013)
- WLP (2001)

no.	gloss	Proto-Pidjanan	Mawayana	source (Mawayana)	Wapishana	source (Wapishana)
1	açaí palm	*waɓu	waɓu		waɓu	WLP (2000)
2	acouchy	*aɗuɾi	aɗuɾi		aɗuɾi	WLP (2000)
3	ant sp.	*kuki	kuki ‘saúva’		kuki ‘leafcutter ant’	
4	armadillo sp.	*mVɾuɾV ?	muɾuɾa ‘armadillo sp.’		maɾuɾu ‘giant armadillo’	
5	armpit	*kisapu	ɾɨ-keːsu		ɨ-kiʃapu	
6	as (essive)	*niː	ni ‘(change) into’	Carlin (2006)	niː ‘future’, ‘essive’	
7	bacaba palm	*mapɨɽɨ	mɨsɨ		mapɨʐa	WLP (2000)
8	banana	*sɨːɽɨ	sɨsɨɓa		sɨːʐɨ	WLP (2000)
9	bat	*tamaɾɨwa	tamaɾɨwa		tamaɾɨu	WLP (2000)
10	bathe (to)	*kawa	kaw-e	Carlin (no date)	ũ-kau-pa-n	Silva, Silva & Oliveira (2013)
11	beads	*kasuɾuː	kasuɾu		kaʃuɾuː	WLP (2000)
12	bee / honey	*maːɓa	maɓa		maːɓa	
13	belt	*ɽantawɨ	ɨ-ɾantawɨɗa		ʐaːɗawi	WLP (2000)
14	bird	*kutɨʔɨɽa	kuʧɨsa		kutɨʔɨʐa	
15	bird sp. 1	*anaɾau	anaɾu ‘socó (heron sp.)’		anaɾau ‘marrecão (duck sp.)’	Silva, Silva & Oliveira (2013)
16	bird sp. 2	*ma(ɾ)atɨ	maːtɨ ‘jacu bird’		maɾatɨ ‘unidentified bird’	WLP (2000)
17	bird sp. 3	*kaɾapa	kaɾahpaɗa ‘arahka’	Carlin (no date)	kaɾapa ‘aracuã’	WLP (2001)
18	bite (to)	*a(ɾ)uːta	ɾ-autʃa-na ‘he bit me’	Carlin (2006)	aɾuːta-n	Silva, Silva & Oliveira (2013)
19	black	*puɗɨ	uɗɨ-ɾe		puɗɨ-ʔu	WLP (2000)
20	blow (to)	*puːta	ɾ-uʧ-e	Howard (1985-1986)	ɨ-puːta-n	WLP (2000)
21	Brazil nut	*minaɨ	minɨ ‘peanut’, ‘Brazil nut’		minaɨ	WLP (2000)
22	breast	*ɗɨɲɨ	ɾiː-ɗɨ		ɨ-ɗɨnɨ	WLP (2000)
23	buriti palm	*ɗʲɨwɨ	jɨwɨ ‘buriti’		ɗʲɨwɨ ‘ité fruit’	WLP (2000)
24	burn (to)	*kaʔawa	kaw-e ‘burn (intr.)’		kaʔawa-n ‘burn (intr.)’	WLP (2000)
25	butterfly	*ʦamaʦama	samasama		tamtam	WLP (2000)
26	caiman sp.	*atuɾɨ	aʧuɾɨ		atuɾɨ ‘small caiman’	
27	cajá fruit	*ɽuːɓa	ɾuɓa		ʐuːp	Silva, Silva & Oliveira (2013)
28	canoe	*kanawa	kanawa		kanawa	WLP (2000)
29	capybara	*kasu	kasu		kaʃu	WLP (2000)
30	child	*kuɾai-	kuɾenu		kuɾaiɗaunaː	
31	child / egg	*ɗaɲi	ɾiː-ɗe, ɾiː-ɗesi		ɨ-ɗani	
32	cicada	*wamu	womu		wamu	Silva, Silva & Oliveira (2013)
33	claw / nail	*ɓaɗʲi	ɾɨ-ɓaɗʲi		ɨ-ɓaʐi	WLP (2000)
34	coati	*kuaɗjɨ	kaɗɨ		kuaʧi	WLP (2000)
35	cockroach	*ɓasaɾawa	ɓasaɾawa		ɓaʃaɾau	WLP (2000)
36	comb	*mauCi	mutiɓa		maudi	WLP (2000)
37	corn	*maɽiki	maɾiki		maʐiki	WLP (2000)
38	curassow	*pawisi	awisi		pawiʃi	Silva, Silva & Oliveira (2013)
39	deer sp.	*kusaɾa	kusaɾa ‘deer, small’		kuʃaɾa ‘deer, bush’	
40	die (to)	*mawa-	maw-ɗa		mawa-ka, mau-ka-n	WLP (2000)
41	dry	*maːɾa	maɾa-ɓa-sɨ	Howard (1985-1986)	maːɾa-n	WLP (2000)
42	eagle sp.	*kuku-	kukuɗa ‘hawk sp.’		kukui ‘harpy eagle’	WLP (2000)
43	earthworm	*paɽaɾu	aɾaɾu		paʐaɾu	WLP (2000)
44	eat (to)	*ɲika	ɾ-ĩka		pɨ-nika	WLP (2000)
45	elbow	*patuɾi	ɾiː-ɸaʧuɾi		ɨ-patuɾi	WLP (2000)
46	electric eel	*kaʦumi	katumi		kasumi	WLP (2000)
47	fan	*awaɾiba	wiɾiɓe, n-wiɾiɓa		awaɾiɓa-i	WLP (2000)
48	father	*Ca	ɾɨ-ta		ɨ-daɾɨ	
49	fire	*tikaɽi	ʃikaɾi		tikaʐi	
50	fish	*kupaɨ	kuwɨ		kupaɨ	
51	fish sp. 1	*ɽiːta	ɾiʧe ‘traíra’		ʐiːtaɓa ‘fish sp.’	WLP (2000)
52	fish sp. 2	*aʧimaɾa	atimaɾa ‘trairão’		aʧimaɾa ‘fish sp.’	WLP (2000)
53	fish sp. 3	*kuɾɨɽɨ	kuɾɨsɨ ‘surubim’		kuɾɨʐɨ ‘surubim’	WLP (2000)
54	flat area	*ɗaːɾa	ɗaɾa ‘grass(land)’		ɗaːɾa ‘a flat barrier’	WLP (2000)
55	flower	*sɨwɨ	ɾɨ-sɨwɨ	Howard (1985-1986)	ɨ-suːsu	WLP (2000)
56	from	*(ɾ)iki	aʔu-ɾiki ‘from there’	Carlin (2006)	iki	WLP (2000)
57	fruit	*(a)ka	ɾɨ-ka		ɨ-aka	WLP (2000)
58	give (to)	*taː	ɾɨ-ʧ-e-sɨ	Howard (1985-1986)	ɨ-taː-n	
59	grandmother	*(ʃ)Vːɽu ?	wa-ʃuɾu		ɨʔ- ɨːʐu	WLP (2000)
60	hair	*iCi	ɾ-iʃiɾama		ɨ-iʃi	WLP (2000)
61	hand	*kaʔɨ	ɾɨ-kɨɓa		ɨ-kaʔɨ	
62	heart	*ɲɨkɨɲɨja	ɾiːʔ-ĩkĩjã		ɨ-ɲɨkɨnɨː	WLP (2000)
63	hit (to)	*ɽuʔita	ɾita-ka-nu ‘hit each other’	Howard (1985-1986)	ɨ-ʐuʔita-n ‘he hit’	WLP (2000)
64	house	*paɲi-	aĩku		paniɓa ‘outside’, paniːnum ‘entrance, door, doorway’	WLP (2000)
65	I	*nnu	nnu		ũɡaɾɨ	WLP (2000)
66	if / when	*ana	ana	Carlin (2006)	ana	WLP (2000)
67	iguana	*suwana	suwanaɗa		suwan	WLP (2000)
68	inajá palm	*puk- ?	ukatɨ ‘inajá’		pukuɾidi ‘kokorite palm’	WLP (2000)
69	ingá tree	*kuɾami	kuɾami ‘ingá’		kuɾami ‘ingá do mato’	Silva, Silva & Oliveira (2013)
70	intestines	*ukuɾi(ɾi)	ɾ-ukuɾiɾi		ɨ-ukuɾi	
71	knee	*kuɗuɾu	ɾiː-kuɗuɾu		ɨ-kuɗuɾu	
72	knife	*maɾija	maɾe		maɾiː, ɨ-maɾija-n	
73	language	*paɾa	ɾiːʔ-aɾa		ɨ-paɾada-n	WLP (2000)
74	leaf	*anaɓa	ɾ-anaɓa		ɨ-anaɓa	WLP (2000)
75	left hand	*asVɓa-	asuɓaɗʲanu ‘right hand’	Howard (1985-1986)	aʃaɓaɾu	Silva, Silva & Oliveira (2013)
76	leg / shin	*(i)taɓa	ɾiː-ʃaɓa ‘leg, shin’		ɨ-taɓaʔu ‘leg’	
77	louse	*nnai	nni		nai	
78	macaw sp.	*(k)aɽaɾu	aɾaɾu ‘yellow macaw’		kaʐaɾɨ ‘yellow macaw’	WLP (2000)
79	manioc	*kaɲɨɽɨ	kaːsɨ, kãːsɨ		kanɨʐɨ	WLP (2000)
80	manioc press	*(ɲ)iːɽu- ?	isune		niːʐu	WLP (2000)
81	meat food	*wɨɲɨ	wĩ, ɾɨ-wɨnɨ	Howard (1985-1986)	wɨnɨ-i, ɨ-wɨnɨ	WLP (2000)
82	medicine	*-ʦaɾa	ɾɨ-ɨtaɾa		ɨ-kasaɾa	WLP (2000)
83	monkey sp. 1	*ɾuːmu	ɾumu ‘spider monkey’		ɾuːmi ‘spider monkey’	
84	monkey sp. 2	*ʦɨɓɨɾɨ	tɨɓɨɾɨ ‘howler monkey’		sɨɓɨɾɨ ‘howler monkey’	
85	monkey sp. 3	*puwatɨ	otʃɨ ‘capuchin monkey’		puwatɨ ‘capuchin monkey’	
86	monkey sp. 4	*(i)ʧaɨmaː	ʧɨma ‘tamarin monkey’		ʧaɨmaː ‘black tamarin’	Silva, Silva & Oliveira (2013)
87	moon	*kaɨɽɨ	kɨsɨ		kaɨʐɨ	
88	mosquito sp.	*miʦu	mitu		misu	
89	mother	*Caɾu	ɾiː-taɾu		ɨ-daɾu	
90	murumuru	*ɓɨɾɨ	ɓɨɾɨ ‘murumuru palm’		ɓɨɾɨ ‘palm (unidentified)’	WLP (2000)
91	nose	*(i)ɗiɓa	ɾɨ-tiɓa		ɨ-iɗiɓa	
92	old man	*tɨɲa(u)ɾɨnau	tauɾɨnu		tɨnaɾɨnau	
93	opossum sp.	*waːʦa	wata ‘opossum sp.’		waːsa ‘opossum, woolly’	WLP (2000)
94	other	*ɓaʔuɾVnu	ɓuɾunu	Howard (1985-1986)	ɓaʔuɾan, ɓaʔuɾanɨ-aɓa	WLP (2000)
95	papaya	*maʔapaja	maɓaja		maʔapai	WLP (2000)
96	parrot sp.	*waɾu	waɾu		waɾu	WLP (2000)
97	partner	*miɲa- ?	ɾiː-meːɾawa		ɨ-minaɨɗaʔɨ	WLP (2000)
98	path	*ɗɨnapu	ɗɨnu		ɗɨnapu	WLP (2000)
99	payment	*winipa	ɾi-wina		ɨ-winipa	WLP (2000)
100	peccary sp. 1	*ɓakɨɾa	ɓakɨɾa ‘collared peccary’		ɓakɨɾɨ ‘collared peccary’	
101	peccary sp. 2	*Ciʧa	ɾita ‘white-lipped peccary’		ɓiʧa, ɓiʧi ‘white-lipped peccary’	
102	person	*piɗaɲa	ɗʲe, ɗʲeː		piɗan, piɗana-n	WLP (2000)
103	pet	*ɨɽa	ɾ-ɨsa	Howard (1985-1986)	ɨʔ-ɨʐa	WLP (2000)
104	red	*wɨɽa	usa-sɨ		wɨʐa-ʔu	WLP (2000)
105	rib	*aɾaɗɨ(ɗɨ)	ɾiːʔ-aɾaɗɨ		ɨ-aɾaɗɨɗɨ, ɨ-aɾaɗɨʔɨ	
106	rope	*iɲuʔi	jũwi		inuʔi, inuɓi ‘hammock rope’	WLP (2000)
107	salt	*ɗɨwɨ	ɗɨwɨ		ɗɨwɨ	WLP (2000)
108	sand	*kaːtɨ	kaʧɨ	Howard (1985-1986)	kaːtɨ	WLP (2000)
109	seat	*(i)ʦaba	isaɓe, ɾiːʔ-isaɓa		taɓa-i, ɨ-taɓa	WLP (2000)
110	see (to)	*tVka	ɾi-ʧika		ɨ- tɨka-pa-n	
111	shaman	*maɾɨnawɨ	maɾɨnawɨ		maɾɨnau	WLP (2000)
112	shoulder / arm	*(i)ʦawaɗa	ɾiː-sawaɗa ‘arm’		ɨ- tawaɗa ‘shoulder’	
113	sieve	*manaɾɨ	manaɾɨ		manaɾɨ ‘cassava sifter’	WLP (2000)
114	skin / bark	*maɗa	ɾiː-maɗa		ɨ-maɗa	WLP (2000)
115	sky	*Vkaɽi	ɨkaɾi		aukaʐi	
116	sloth sp.	*awɨ	awɨ		awɨ	Silva, Silva & Oliveira (2013)
117	small	*suɗi ?	ʃiɗʲiɗʲa-ɾe ‘small, narrow’	Howard (1985-1986)	suɗi	
118	smoke	*isa-	ise-sɨ	Howard (1985-1986)	iʃa-n ‘cloud’	
119	song	*kɨnɨ	kɨni, ɾiː-kɨnɨ		kɨnɨ-i, ɨ-kɨnɨ	W5
120	spider	*(s)uːwa	uwaɓa		suːwa	
121	stone	*kɨɓa	kɨɓa		kɨɓa	
122	sun	*kamuː	kamu		kamuː	
123	sweet potato	*kaCɨɽɨː	katɨ		kaːʐɨː	WLP (2000)
124	tapir	*kuɗui	kuɗi		kuɗui	
125	tell (to)	*kɨwaːɗa	ɾɨ-kɨwaɗ-e-sɨ ‘he tells it’		kuwaːɗa-n ‘tell’	WLP (2000)
126	termite	*maɽi	maɾiɓa		maʐi	WLP (2000)
127	thin	*miCa-	metaɗa	Howard (1985-1986)	miɗaʔɨ	WLP (2000)
128	thornbush	*Cawɨɽɨ	tawɨsɨ		kawɨʐɨ	WLP (2000)
129	throat	*kuɾukuɾu	ɾiː-kuɾukuɾu		kuɾukuɾu-n ‘larynx’	WLP (2000)
130	tick	*kuCVCVɓa	kunuriɓa		kuɾinaɓa	
131	timbó liana	*uku	uku ‘timbó liana’		uku ‘poison for fish’	
132	tinamou sp.	*mami	mami ‘tinamou sp.’		mami ‘bird sp.’	Silva, Silva & Oliveira (2013)
133	toad sp.	*tuɾuɾuɓa	tʃuɾuɾuɓa		tuɾuɾuɓa	WLP (2000)
134	tobacco	*ʦuma	tuma		suːma	
135	tongue	*ɲiɲuɓa	ɾɨ-jũjũɓa		ɨ-ninuɓa	
136	tortoise	*wɨɾV	uːɾɨ		wɨɾaɗa	
137	toucan sp.	*ʧaːkui	takwe ‘toucan sp.’		ʧaːkui ‘toucan sp.’	
138	tree / wood	*atamɨna	aʧamɨna		atamɨn, atamɨnɨ	
139	tree trunk	*kaɗɨ-	ɾɨ-kaɗɨ		ɨ-kaɗɨnaː	WLP (2000)
140	trumpeter	*namVʧɨ	namɨtɨ ‘jacamim’		namaʧi ‘gray trumpeter’	WLP (2000)
141	tucumã palm	*sawaɾa	sawaɾa ‘tucumã’		ʃawaɾaɨ ‘unidentified palm’	WLP (2000)
142	vulture sp.	*kuɾumu	kuɾumu ‘vulture sp.’		kuɾɨm ‘bird sp.’	WLP (2000)
143	walk	*siʔuka ?	ɾu-suka		tʃiʔika-n	WLP (2000)
144	water	*wɨnɨ	unɨ, uːnɨ		wɨnɨ	
145	we	*waɨnau	weʔawɨnu		waɨnau	WLP (2000)
146	what / who	*ka	ka		kan, kanum	WLP (2000)
147	wind	*awaɾɨ	awaɾɨ		awaɾɨ	WLP (2000)
148	with	*(i)tɨma	ri-ʃima		ɨ-tɨma	WLP (2000)
149	woman	*ɽɨna	ɾɨnaɾu		ʐɨna	

== Vocabulary ==
100-word Swadesh list for Mawayana and Wapishana:

no.	gloss	Mawayana	Wapishana
1	I	nnu	ũgaɾɨ
2	you (sg.)	i	pɨgaɾɨ
3	we (incl.)	weʔawɨnu	waɨnau
4	this	tiʔa	wɨɾɨʔɨ
5	that	aɾu	wɨɾɨʔɨ
6	who	ka	kanum
7	what	ka	kanum
8	not	ʧika, ma-sɨ	aunaː
9	all	meke-nu	ipai
10	many	ɾea-nu	iɾiɓa-ʔu
11	one	aɓõ(i)ja	ɓaɨɗaʔapa
12	two	aɗaka	ɗʲaʔɨtam
13	big	tawɾe-ɾe	ɨɗaɾɨ-ʔu
14	long	kɨʔu-ɾe	ʐaʔaɓaʔɨ
15	small	ʃiɗʲiɗʲa-ɾe	soɗi
16	woman	ɾɨnaɾu	ʐɨna
17	man	asɨna	ɗaunajuɾa
18	person	ɗʲe	piɗan
19	fish	kuwɨ	kupaɨ
20	bird	kuʧɨsa	kutɨʔɨʐa
21	dog	jimaɗa	aɾimaɾaka
22	louse	Nni	nai
23	tree	itiɓaɾi	atamɨn
24	seed	ɾɨ-su	ɨ-ɨːɗa
25	leaf	ɾ-anaɓa	ɨ-anaɓa
26	root	ɾɨ-ʧaɓaɗa	ɨ-iʃitaɓaʔu
27	bark	ɾiː-maɗa	ɨ-maɗa
28	skin	ɾiː-maɗa	ɨ-maɗa
29	meat	wĩ	wɨnɨ-i
30	blood	ɾiː-sɨkɨwɨɗa	iʐa-i
31	bone	ɾiː-kɨɓɨ	ɨ-niwaʔɨʐi
32	grease	ɾiti	kiwin-iː
33	egg	ɾiː-ɗe	ɨ-ɗani
34	horn	ɾ-õʃĩɗa	ɨ-uʐuː
35	tail	ɾɨ-tuna	ɗʲɨu
36	feather	ɾ-iʃiɓa	kɨtɨɓa
37	hair	ɾ-iʃiɾama	ɨ-iʃi
38	head	ɾɨ-kɨwɨ	ɨ-ʐuwaɨ
39	ear	ɾiː-siɗʲa	ɨ-tain
40	eye	ɾ-oso	ɨ-awɨn
41	nose	ɾɨ-tiɓa	ɨ-iɗiɓa
42	mouth	ɾ-umiɗʲa	ɨ-ɗaku
43	tooth	ɾɨ-ʔu	ɨ-ɨɗaku
44	tongue	ɾ-ĩjũjũɓa	ɨ-ninuɓa
45	claw	ɾɨ-ɓaɗʲi	ɨ-ɓaʐi
46	foot	ɾɨ-ɾuɓa	ɨ-kidiɓa
47	knee	ɾiː-kuɗuɾu	ɨ-kuɗuɾu
48	hand	ɾɨ-kɨɓa	ɨ-kaʔɨ
49	belly	ɾ-ijika	ɨ-tuɓa
50	neck	ɾiː-ɾewɨ	ɨ-kanaɨ
51	breast	ɾiː-ɗɨ	ɨ-ɗɨnɨ
52	heart	ɾiːʔ-ĩkĩjã	ɨ-ɲɨkɨnɨː
53	liver	ɾɨ-ʃuɓa	ɨ-kɨɓaː
54	drink	kuɾa-sɨ	ɨ-tɨʐa-n
55	eat	ɾ-ĩka	ɨ-nɨka-n
56	bite	awʧa-sɨ	ɨ-aɾuta-n
57	see	ɾɨ-ʧika-sɨ	ɨ-tɨka-pa-n
58	hear	ɾɨ-kɨmɨd-e-sɨ	ɨ-abata-n
59	know	ɾɨ-ɾud-e-sɨ	ɨ-aitapa-n
60	sleep	a-tũwa	ɨ-daʔawɨ-n
61	die	mawɗa	ɨ-mau-ka-n
62	kill	ɾu-kuɗa	ɨ-ʐuwia-n
63	swim	ʧokwa-sɨ	ɨ-nɨota-n
64	fly	maɾ-e-sɨ	ɨ-ʐɨʔɨta-n
65	walk	ɾu-suka	ɨ-ʧiʔika-n
66	come	jaɗ-e	ɨ-waʔati-n
67	lie	ʧukuɗ-e-sɨ	ɨ-waʃatina-n
68	sit	itaɗ-e-sɨ	ɨ-sakanata-n
69	stand	kaʧɨmɨʧ-e-sɨ	ɨ-kadiʃita-n
70	give	rɨ-ʧ-e-sɨ	ɨ-taː-n
71	say	ɾɨ-m-e	ɨ-kia-n
72	sun	kamu	kamuː
73	moon	kɨsɨ	kaɨʐɨ
74	star	siwaɾu	wiʐi
75	water	u(ː)nɨ	wɨnɨ
76	rain	u(ː)nɨ	wɨnɨ
77	stone	kɨɓa	kɨɓa
78	sand	kaʧɨ	kaːtɨ
79	earth	ʃimaɾi	imiʔi
80	cloud	ekaɾi ɾita-ɾe	iʃaʔɨʐi
81	smoke	isesɨ	tikaʐi ʃan
82	fire	ʃikaɾi	tikaʐi
83	ash	ʃikaɾuɓa	paɾitiɓi
84	burn (intr.)	kaw-e	ɨ-kaʔawa-n
85	path	ɗɨnu	ɗɨnapu
86	mountain	ɾɨnɨ	miɗɨkɨu
87	red	usa-sɨ	wɨʐa-ʔu
88	green	ʧɨha-ɾe	kuʔuɾi-ʔu
89	yellow	ʧɨha-ɾe	upaɾita-ʔu
90	white	kɨse-ɾe	ɓaɾaka-ʔu
91	black	uɗɨ-ɾe	puɗɨ-ʔu
92	night	tɨɓokoʔa	aiwakaʔan
93	hot	ɗʲiʧa-sɨ	wi(ː)ʧa-ʔu
94	cold	ɾika-ɾe	waɗiɗi-ʔu
95	full	etaɗa	paida-n
96	new	wiʧakaɾi	paʔina-ʔu
97	good	wĩja-ɾe	kaiman
98	round	ajɓɨɓɨ-ɾe	kaɗaʐaɗa-ʔu
99	dry	maɾaɓa-sɨ	maːɾa-n
100	name	ɾɨ-ɾenka	ɨʔ-ɨː

== Bibliography ==
- Melville, C.; Tracy, F. V.; Williams, O. Wapishana. Intercontinental Dictionary Series. 2007. Accessed on Oct. 30, 2007.
- SB (Surinaams Bijbelgenootschap / Suriname Bible Society). Kaimana’o Tominkaru Paradan (The New Testament). Paramaribo, Georgetown: Suriname Bible Society and Guyana Bible Society, 2012.
