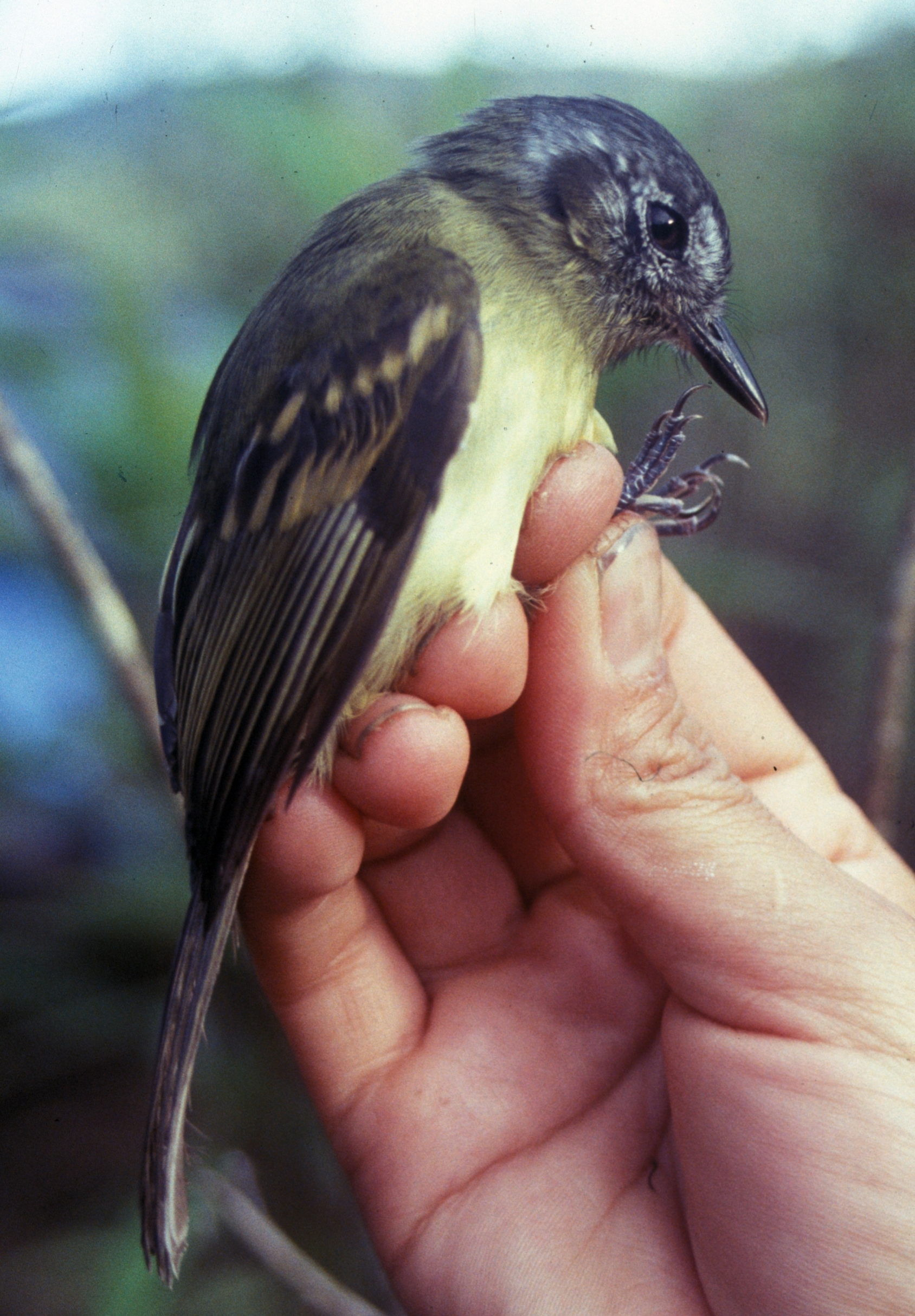
- Slaty-capped flycatcher (L. superciliaris)

Scientific classification
- Kingdom: Animalia
- Phylum: Chordata
- Class: Aves
- Order: Passeriformes
- Family: Tyrannidae
- Genus: Leptopogon; Cabanis, 1844

Type species
- Leptopogon superciliaris von Tschudi, 1844

= Leptopogon =

Genus of birds

Leptopogon is a genus of birds in the tyrant flycatcher family Tyrannidae.

The genus contains the following four species:

Image	Scientific name	Common name	Distribution
	Leptopogon rufipectus	Rufous-breasted flycatcher	Colombia, Ecuador, far northwestern Peru and far western Venezuela
	Leptopogon taczanowskii	Inca flycatcher	Peru.
	Leptopogon amaurocephalus	Sepia-capped flycatcher	Argentina, Belize, Bolivia, Brazil, Colombia, Costa Rica, Ecuador, French Guiana, Guatemala, Guyana, Honduras, Mexico, Nicaragua, Panama, Paraguay, Peru, Suriname, and Venezuela
	Leptopogon superciliaris	Slaty-capped flycatcher	Costa Rica through Colombia and northern Venezuela to northern Bolivia, Ecuador, and Peru.
