= Parawana language =

Extinct Arawakan language of Brazil

Parawana
- Native to: Brazil
- Region: Lower Branco River
- Extinct: (date missing)
- Language family: Arawakan: Northern; Pidjanan; Parawana–Aroaqui; Parawana

Language codes
- ISO 639-3: None (mis)
- Glottolog: para1324

Parawana is an extinct Arawakan language of Brazil that was spoken on the Wanawaua River (now known as the Anauá River), a tributary of the lower Rio Branco. A word list was collected by Johann Natterer in 1832.

Parawana and Aroaqui are closely related, and may be the same language.
