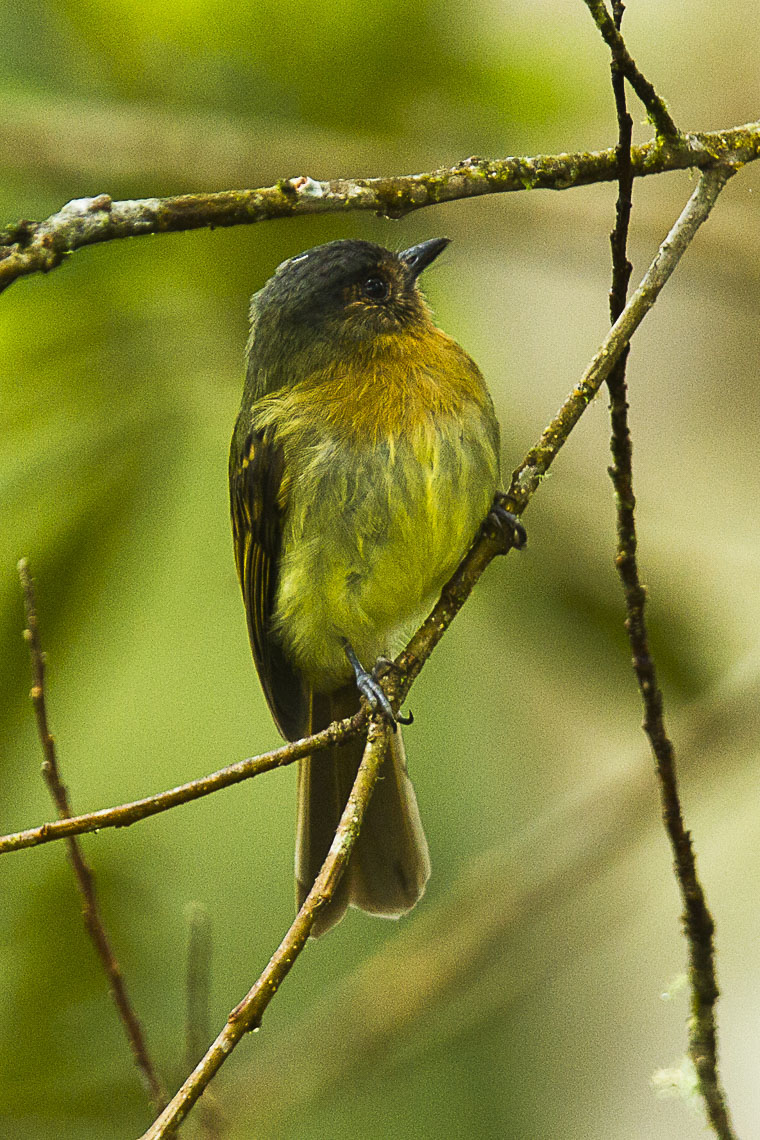

Conservation status
- Least Concern (IUCN 3.1)

Scientific classification
- Kingdom: Animalia
- Phylum: Chordata
- Class: Aves
- Order: Passeriformes
- Family: Tyrannidae
- Genus: Leptopogon
- Species: L. rufipectus

Binomial name
- Leptopogon rufipectus (Lafresnaye, 1846)

Synonyms
- Leptopogon erythrops

= Rufous-breasted flycatcher =

Species of bird

The rufous-breasted flycatcher (Leptopogon rufipectus) is a species of bird in the family Tyrannidae, the tyrant flycatchers. It is found in Colombia, Ecuador, Peru and Venezuela.

== Taxonomy and systematics ==
The rufous-breasted flycatcher was originally described in 1846 as Tyrannula rufipectus. It was later transferred to genus Leptopogon but for a time in the early twentieth century was treated by some authors as Leptopogon erythrops.

The rufous-breasted flycatcher is monotypic. It and the Inca flycatcher (L. taczanowskii) are sister species and may form a superspecies.

== Description ==
The rufous-breasted flycatcher is 13 to 13.5 cm (5.1 to 5.3 in) long; six individuals weighed 10 to 18 g (0.35 to 0.63 oz). The sexes have the same plumage. Adults have a gray crown. Their face is mostly rufous with some gray in the lores and ear coverts and a dusky crescent around the back of the coverts. Their back and rump are olive green. Their wings are dusky with ochraceous or olive yellow edges on the flight feathers. Their wing coverts are dusky with ochraceous tips that show as two indistinct wing bars. Their tail is reddish brown to brownish olive. Their throat and breast are rufous and their belly pale olive yellow. They have a brown iris, a black or dark brown bill, and gray or bluish gray legs and feet.

== Distribution and habitat ==
The rufous-breasted flycatcher has a disjunct distribution. One population is found from southern Táchira in western Venezuela south along Colombia's Eastern Andes to western Caquetá Department. Two others are in Colombia's Central and Western Andes. It is patchily, though possibly continuously, distributed along the east slope of the Andes from northern to central Ecuador and again from southern Ecuador into northern Peru to the Marañón River. It inhabits the interior and edges of humid montane forest and secondary forest in the subtropical and lower temperate zones. In elevation it ranges between 1,800 and 2,700 m (5,900 and 8,900 ft) in Venezuela, between 1,600 and 2,800 m (5,200 and 9,200 ft) in Colombia, mostly between 1,600 and 2,500 m (5,200 and 8,200 ft) in Ecuador, and between 1,650 and 2,150 m (5,400 and 7,100 ft) in Peru.

== Behavior ==
=== Movement ===
The rufous-breasted flycatcher is a year-round resident.

=== Feeding ===
The rufous-breasted flycatcher's diet has not been detailed but is known to be mostly arthropods. It forages from the forest's understory to its middle level as much as 20 m (65 ft) above the ground. It sits erect on a perch and mostly hover-gleans or snatches fruit and insects from leaves in short sallies from it, and less often from branches and twigs. It typically forages singly or in pairs and often joins mixed-species feeding flocks.

=== Breeding ===
The rufous-breasted flycatcher appears to breed mostly between September and November but a few active nests have also been found between March and May. The nest is a sphere with a side entrance, made of moss, rootlets, and spider silk with a lining of dry fibers and seed down. It is typically suspended from a root or vine below an overhanging earth bank, and almost always by or very near a stream. The clutch is two eggs. The incubation period is not known; fledging occurs 21 to 23 days after hatch. Apparently only the female incubates, but both parents provision nestlings.

=== Vocalization ===
The rufous-breasted flycatcher's most heard vocalization is "a loud and emphatic skwee!...sometimes run together into a very fast series of shrill sputtered notes". It also gives "1-5 loud, abrupt, squeaky spiK! notes".

== Status ==
The IUCN has assessed the rufous-breasted flycatcher as being of Least Concern. It has a large range; its population size is not known and is believed to be stable. "The species is vulnerable to the loss of its habitat through deforestation for agricultural expansion. Currently however, tree cover loss is highly localised and overall negligible, and thus unlikely to be causing population declines." It is considered fairly common in Venezuela, Colombia, and Peru, and uncommon and local in Ecuador.
