= Atorada language =

Arawakan language of Brazil and Guyana

Atorada
- Atoraí
- Native to: Brazil, Guyana
- Ethnicity: Atorai people
- Native speakers: ("few" cited 2000)
- Language family: Arawakan: Northern; Wapishanan (Rio Branco); Atorada

Language codes
- ISO 639-3: aox
- Glottolog: ator1244
- Linguasphere: 82-ADA-aa

Atorada or Atoraí is a moribund Arawakan language of Brazil and Guyana. There were only a few speakers as of 2000. The language is poorly documented, and it is frequently seen as a dialect of closely related Wapishana.

== History ==
The Atorai people and language were historically distributed between the Rupununi and Kuyuwini Rivers, but later migrated among the Wapishana people, when they began to switch to the Wapishana language. William Farabee (1918) reported the customs of the Atorai to be essentially identical with those of the Wapishana. The only significant documentation of Atorai are two wordlists in Carl Friedrich Philipp von Martius's 1867 work Glossaria linguarum brasiliensium and another recorded by Farabee and published in 1918, as well as a talk held in 2018 by Zachary O'Hagan.

== Classification ==
Atorai is grouped with Wapishana in a subgroup within the Pidjanan languages. Terrence Kaufman (1994), Alexandra Aikhenvald (1999), and Henri Ramirez (2019) classified Atorai as a dialect of Wapishana. Sérgio Meira (2020) groups Atorad with Pidjanan.

== Phonology ==
=== Vowels ===
Nine vowels are attested in Atorai, eight of them distinguishing in length.

	Front	Central	Back
Close	i iː	ɨ ɨː	u uː
Mid	ɛ		
Open		a aː	

Diphthongs attested include /ai/, /aɨ/, /au/, /ɛi/, and /ɛɨ/.

=== Consonants ===
Atorai has 22 consonant phonemes. Consonants in italics are attested in only O'Hagan (2018), and phonemes in (parentheses) are extremely rare.

	Bilabial	Alveolar	Alveopalatal	Retroflex	Palatal	Velar	Uvular	Glottal
Stop	p	t				k kʷ		ʔ
Implosive	ɓ	ɗ						
Affricate		(t͡s)	tʃ					
Fricative	(ꞵ)	(s)	ʃ		ʝ	ɣ ɣʷ		h
Nasal	m	n			(ɲ)			
Glide	w			(ɭ)	j			
Rhotic				ɽ			(ʀ)	

Voice is not contrasted for obstruents, and instead of voiced stops, voiced implosives occur in Atorai.

=== Phonotactics ===
Atorai has a (C)V(V)(C) syllable structure. The glottal stop cannot occur word-initially.
