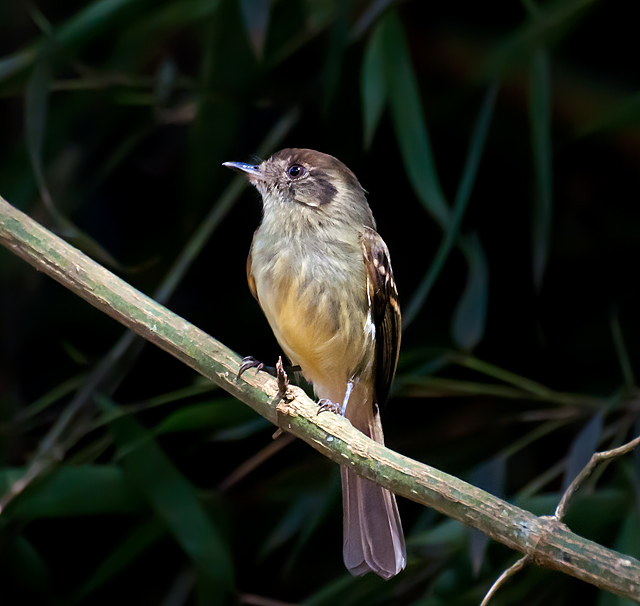
- In Piraju, São Paulo, Brazil

Conservation status
- Least Concern (IUCN 3.1)

Scientific classification
- Kingdom: Animalia
- Phylum: Chordata
- Class: Aves
- Order: Passeriformes
- Family: Tyrannidae
- Genus: Leptopogon
- Species: L. amaurocephalus

Binomial name
- Leptopogon amaurocephalus Cabanis, 1846

= Sepia-capped flycatcher =

Species of bird

The sepia-capped flycatcher (Leptopogon amaurocephalus) is a species of bird in the family Tyrannidae, the tyrant flycatchers. It is found in Mexico, every Central American country except El Salvador, and every mainland South American country except Chile; it is known in Uruguay as a vagrant.

== Taxonomy and systematics ==
The sepia-capped flycatcher has these six subspecies:

- L. a. pileatus Cabanis, 1866
- L. a. idius Wetmore, 1957
- L. a. diversus Todd, 1913
- L. a. orinocensis Zimmer, JT & Phelps, WH, 1946
- L. a. peruvianus Sclater, PL & Salvin, 1868
- L. a. amaurocephalus Cabanis, 1846

== Description ==
The sepia-capped flycatcher is 11.5 to 14 cm (4.5 to 5.5 in) long and weighs an average of about 12 g (0.42 oz). The sexes have the same plumage. Adults of the nominate subspecies L. a. amaurocephalus have a sepia brown crown and a paler nape. Their lores are dull yellowish olive with some dusky mixed in and their ear coverts have a dusky patch at the rear. Their face is otherwise light olive. Their back and rump are olive green and their uppertail coverts russet brown. Their wings are dusky with pale yellowish olive edges on the flight feathers. Their wing coverts are dusky with buff to ochraceous buff tips that show as two wing bars. Their tail feathers are dull brown with paler brown edges. Their chin and throat are grayish olive with faint dull white streaks. Their breast and flanks are light olive and their belly yellowish white to yellow.

The other subspecies of the sepia-capped flycatcher differ from the nominate and each other thus:

- L. a. pileatus: like the nominate but with strong tinge of warm cinnamon brown on the uppertail coverts and tail feathers
- L. a. idius: grayer overall, more grayish green above, and paler yellow below than nominate; no dark ends on the ear coverts; strong tinge of warm cinnamon brown on the uppertail coverts and tail feathers
- L. a. diversus: much darker brown crown and paler yellow belly than nominate; buffy edges on the tail feathers
- L. a. orinocensis: darker crown and less yellowish back than nominate
- L. a. peruvianus: darker olive crown than nominate; dark grayish back and rump; pale yellow edges on flight feathers and wing coverts

Both sexes of all subspecies have an iris whose color can be from light brownish yellow to dark brown, a black or dark brown bill with sometimes a pale base to the mandible, and legs and feet of various shades of gray.

== Distribution and habitat ==
The sepia-capped flycatcher has a disjunct distribution. The subspecies are found thus:

- L. a. pileatus: from southern Veracruz, northern Oaxaca, and the Yucatán Peninsula in Mexico south on the Caribbean slope through Belize, Guatemala, Honduras, and Nicaragua to central Costa Rica; Pacific slope from central Costa Rica to central Panama
- L. a. idius: Coiba Island off southwestern Panama
- L. a. diversus: from Colombia's Sierra Nevada de Santa Marta south in the Magdalena River valley and east to Venezuela's Zulia state in the Serranía del Perijá
- L. a. orinocensis: western Venezuela from southern Táchira to Portuguesa state; from central Amazonas and northern Bolívar states in Venezuela east through the Guianas and northern Brazil to the Atlantic in Amapá
- L. a. peruvianus: Colombia's Eastern Andes south through eastern Ecuador and eastern Peru into northern Bolivia and east from there through Brazil from Amazonas and Rondônia east into northern Mato Grosso
- L. a. amaurocephalus: southern and eastern Brazil from Mato Grosso, Maranhão and Pernambuco south into Rio Grande do Sul and west through eastern Bolivia and all of Paraguay into Argentina's Salta Province in the northwest and Corrientes Province in the northeast Sight records in Uruguay lead the South American Classification Committee of the American Ornithological Society to list it as a vagrant there.

The sepia-capped flycatcher primarily inhabits lowland evergreen forest, mature secondary forest, and plantations in the tropical and lower subtropical zones. In northern Central America it also inhabits semideciduous forest, and gallery forest in the llanos of Venezuela. In elevation it ranges from sea level to 1,300 m (4,300 ft) in Mexico and Central America, to 600 m (2,000 ft) in Colombia, and to 1,100 m (3,600 ft) in Brazil. It is found between 100 and 600 m (300 and 2,000 ft) north of the Orinoco River in Venezuela and up to 1,600 m (5,200 ft) south of it. It reaches 450 m (1,500 ft) in Ecuador, 1,300 m (4,300 ft) in Peru, and 1,000 m (3,300 ft) in Bolivia.

== Behavior ==
=== Movement ===
The sepia-capped flycatcher is a year-round resident.

=== Feeding ===
The sepia-capped flycatcher's diet has not been detailed but is known to include insects and fruits. It forages from the forest understory to its middle level, usually within about 8 m (25 ft) of the ground. It mostly hover-gleans or snatches fruit and insects in short sallies from a perch, and occasionally captures prey on the wing. It typically forages singly or in pairs and often joins mixed-species feeding flocks.

=== Breeding ===
The sepia-capped flycatcher's breeding season has not been defined but includes at least April and May in Mexico. Its nest is a globe with a side entrance, made from moss, leaf stems, and grasses and lined with seed down. It is typically hung from a vine or an exposed root beneath an overhanging log, rock, or stream bank. The clutch size is two or three eggs. The incubation period, time to fledging, and details of parental care are not known.

=== Vocalization ===
Various authors have described the sepia-capped flycatcher's song as "a harsh, almost explosive SKET'a'a'j'j'j or SKET'd'd'r'r'r', last part chattery and vibrating", "a fast, sputtering chatter that trails off toward end, e.g., dre- d'd'd'd'd'd'd'dew, sometimes introduced by a sharper, more emphasized note", and "an abrupt, loud, slightly falling, semimusical chatter: ski'i'i'i'i'i'i'i'eew". It also makes a "softer, descending rattle" and "a quiet tuk".

== Status ==
The IUCN has assessed the sepia-capped flycatcher as being of Least Concern. It has an extremely large range; its estimated population of at least 500,000 mature individuals is believed to be decreasing. No immediate threats have been identified. It occurs in many protected areas. "Little is known about the effects of human activities on populations of Sepia-capped Flycatcher. In Mexico, it is dependent on threatened tropical evergreen forest habitats. The primary threats to this species there are logging of mature forest, habitat conversion for agriculture, and livestock production, and it is likely that these threats are similar elsewhere in its range."
