= Wapishana language =

Arawakan language spoken in Guyana and Brazil

Wapixana
- Wapichan
- Native to: Guyana, Brazil
- Region: border
- Ethnicity: Wapishana, Taruma
- Native speakers: (13,000 cited 2000)
- Language family: Arawakan: Northern; Wapishanan (Rio Branco); Wapixana

Language codes
- ISO 639-3: wap
- Glottolog: wapi1253
- ELP: Wapixana

Wapishana (Wapixana) is an Arawakan language of Guyana and Brazil. It is spoken by over 13,000 people on both sides of the Guyana-Brazil border.

In Brazil the highest concentration of Wapishana speakers are in the municipalities of Cantá and Bonfim, the Serra da Lua region, where it has been recognized as an official language since 2014.

External pressures have diminished the use of Wapishana among younger generations, and it was not until 1987 that Wapishana was used as the teaching language in Indigenous schools of the language community. In 2009, Roraima Federal University created an extension program for learning Wapishana. In Guyana, there are organizations for language preservation, such as Wapichan Wadauniinao Ati'o.

== Classification ==
Kaufman (1994) considered Wapishana, Atorada, and Mapidian to be dialects. Aikhenvald (1999) separates Mawayana/Mapidian/Mawakwa (considered as a single language) from Wapishana, and she includes them in a Rio Branco branch. Ethnologue notes that Atorada has 50% lexical similarity with Wapishana and 20% with Mapidian, and that Wapishana and Mapidian share 10%. Ramirez (2020) also considers Atorai to be a dialect of Wapishana.

Wapishana and Pemon, a Cariban language, have borrowed heavily from each other due to intensive mutual contact.

== Phonology ==
=== Consonants ===
		Labial	Alveolar	Retroflex	Palatal	Velar	Glottal
Plosive	voiceless	p	t			k	ʔ
Plosive	voiced	b		ɖ		ɡ	
Affricate					tʃ		
Nasal		m	n		ɲ		
Fricative			s	ʐ	ʃ		
Tap				ɽ			
Semivowel		w			j		

- Consonants /b ɖ ʐ/ in final position are heard as voiceless [p ʈ ʂ].

=== Vowels ===
	Front	Central	Back
Close	i iː	ɨ ɨː	u uː
Open		a aː	

== Morphology ==
Wapishana personal affixes:
	singular	plural
1st person	n-/m- -na	wa- -wi
2nd person	ɨ-/i- -i	ɨ- -wiko
3rd person	ɾ(ɨ/iʔ)- -sɨ	na- -nu
3rd person refl.	a-	

Wapishana verbal affixes:
thematic	-ta, -ɗa, -ɓa
present	-e
reciprocal	-(a)ka
adjectival	-ɾe, -ke

== Vocabulary ==
=== Flora and fauna ===
Many plants and animals endemic to the region are only known in Wapishana, and the language has a distinct system of taxonomy. An example is the three classes of plants, karam’makau, wapaurib bau and wapananinau, which are indicative of the "cultivation criteria" of the Indigenous people. Karam’makau represents plants collected in the wild, whereas wapaurib bau is the plants that have been domesticated and often bear names based on the location or farmer of origin. Cassava, a foodstuff of major importance to Indigenous people of the region, has a "bewildering variety of names" in Wapishana. Wapananinau are plants with magical properties, and have important functions for shamans of the traditional beliefs.

== Bibliography ==
- Aikhenvald, Alexandra Y. (1999). "The Arawak language family". In Aikhenvald, Alexandra Y.; Dixon, R.M.W. (eds.). The Amazonian languages. Cambridge: Cambridge University Press. pp. 65–106.
- Tracy, Frances V. (1974). "An Introduction to Wapishana Verb Morphology". International Journal of American Linguistics. 40 (2): 120–125. doi:10.1086/465294. S2CID 143605341.
