= Mawayana language =

Arawakan language of South America

Mawayana
- Mapidian
- Native to: Brazil, Guyana and Suriname
- Region: Kwamalasamutu (currently)
- Ethnicity: Mawayana
- Native speakers: 2 (2015)
- Language family: Arawakan: North Arawak; Rio Branco (Wapishanan); Mawayana
- Dialects: Mawakwa?

Language codes
- ISO 639-3: Either: mzx – Mawayana mpw – Mapidian (duplicate code)
- Glottolog: mapi1252 Mapidian-Mawayana mawa1268 Mawakwa (retired)
- ELP: Mawayana

Mawayana (Mahuayana), also known as Mapidian (Maopidyán), is a moribund Arawakan language of northern South America. It used to be spoken by Mawayana people living in ethnic Wai-wai and Tiriyó villages in Brazil, Guyana and Suriname. As of 2015, the last two speakers of the language are living in Kwamalasamutu.

== History ==
In the 1840s, the Mawayana were in contact with the Taruma, but both groups have amalgamated with the Wai-wai people, and those who joined have lost both their languages. Only two elderly women, who were part of a group of Mawayana who accompanied American missionaries to convert the Tiriyó people, and subsequently moved in with them, still spoke the language in 2015, and their children did not speak Mawayana. A few rememberers exist who do not use it on a daily basis.

== Classification ==
Aikhenvald (1999) lists Mawayana (and possibly Mawakwa as a dialect) together with Wapishana under a Rio Branco (North-Arawak) branch of the Arawakan family. Carlin (2006:314) notes that Mawayana "is closely related to Wapishana" and according to Ramirez (2001:530) they share at least 47% of their lexicon.

== Phonology ==
Mawayana has, among its consonants, two implosives, /ɓ/ and /ɗ/, and what has been described as a "retroflex fricativised rhotic", represented with ⟨rž⟩, that it shares with Wapishana. The vowel systems contains four vowels (/i-e, a, ɨ, u-o/), each of which has a nasalised counterpart.

=== Consonants ===
Mawayana consonant phonemes:
		Labial	Alveolar	Palatal	Velar	Glottal
Plosive	plain		t	ʧ	k	ʔ
Plosive	implosive	ɓ	ɗ	ɗʲ		
Fricative				ʃ		
Rhotic			ɾ			
Nasal		m	n			
Glide				j	w	

=== Vowels ===
Mawayana vowel phonemes:

	Front	Central	Back
Close	i	ɨ	u~o
Close-mid	e		u~o
Open		a	

Vowels have both nasal and length contrast.

== Morphology ==
Mawayana personal affixes:
	singular	plural
1	n-/m- -na	wa- -wi
2	ɨ-/i- -i	ɨ- -wiko
3	ɾ(ɨ/iʔ)- -sɨ	na- -nu
3 refl.	a-	

Mawayana verbal affixes:
thematic	-ta, -ɗa, -ɓa
present	-e
reciprocal	-(a)ka
adjectival	-ɾe, -ke

== Morphosyntax ==
Mawayana has a polysynthetic morphology, mainly head-marking and with suffixes, although there are pronominal prefixes. The verbal arguments are indexed on the verb through subject suffixes on intransitive verbs, while agent prefixes and object suffixes on transitive verbs.

n-kataba-sï
1A-grab.PST-3O
'I grabbed him.'

tõwã-sï
sleep.PST-3S
'He fell asleep.'

nnu a-na mauɗa chika-dza Mawayana
1PN when-1S die NEG-COMPL mawayana
'When I die there will be no Mawayana left at all.'

=== Verb roots ===
Verbal roots in Mawayana may be composed of at least one consonant (m- 'say', ch- 'do'), and the root must end in a consonant.
