= Simbari =

Simbari may refer to:

- Simbari Anga, the Sambia people
- Simbari language
- Nicola Simbari (1927-2012), Italian painter

== See also ==
- Simbari Khaleh, Iran
