= Menya language =

Language

Menya
- Native to: Papua New Guinea
- Region: Morobe Province
- Native speakers: (20,000 cited 1998)
- Language family: Trans–New Guinea: Angan; Southeast; Menya

Language codes
- ISO 639-3: mcr
- Glottolog: meny1245

Menya (Menyama, Menye) is an Angan language of Papua New Guinea.

== Classification ==
Menya is classified as an Angan language. Its closest relatives in terms of shared vocabulary are Kapau and Yagwoia at 69-75% and 50-58% respectively. As the Menya-speaking area is bordered on all sides by speakers of other Angan languages, much of the Menya grammar and vocabulary has remained intact and is consistent with other Angan languages. Most ethnographic evidence suggest that the Menya-speaking people do not think of themselves as culturally distinct from their neighbors, as they have no words for Menya identity and people.

== Status ==
Menya is used by the community by all age groups, although there is a growing bilingualism and use of Tok Pisin, and to a lesser extent, English. The Menya language is now being shaped by this bilingualism, as shifts in vocabulary and grammar have become apparent. Nonetheless, unlike in other areas of New Guinea, language attitudes towards Menya remain positive, and the language is not endangered.

== Phonology ==
=== Consonants ===
The language is notable for its lack of fricative phonemes (other than the glottal /h/) and liquid phonemes.

Consonant phonemes
		Labial	Dental	Palatal	Velar	Uvular	Glottal
Nasal		m	n	ɲ	ŋ		
Plosive	plain	p	t̪	t͡ʃ	k	q	
Plosive	pre-nasalized	ᵐb	ⁿd̪	ᶮd͡ʑ	ᵑɡ	ᶰɢ	
Fricative							h
Approximant				j	w		

Fricatives most often appear as realizations of plosives between vowels. Similarly, the liquids [ɾ] and [l] are allophones of /t̪/ in intervocalic position.

It is also worth noting the uvular plosive is reported to be the most frequently occurring phoneme in the language.

Menya's phonotactic constraints generally prohibit certain consonant clusters; as a result, an epenthetic vowel is frequently inserted to break up such clusters. Additionally, word-final consonants are often followed by a vocalic release; that is, /p/ tends to be followed by [u], while both /t/ and /k/ release to [i].

=== Vowels ===
	Front	Central	Back
Close	i		u
Mid	e	ə	o
Open		ɑ	

== Morphosyntax ==
The basic clause order of Menya is SOV. The language is dominantly right-headed, with suffixes and enclitics being far more prominent than prefixes and proclitics.

Menya sentences require one of the following clitics to express the speaker's motivation:

=i ~ =nji	indicative	speaker informing the addressee
=ta	polar question	speaker asking the addressee for a truth value judgment
=wä	content question	speaker asking the for the details
=ti	dubitative	speaker expressing doubt or lack of knowledge

Since verbs usually come last in Menya sentences, that is where clitics are often appended. However, this is not always the case.

If the last word of the sentence is a noun, an adjective or a verb, the clitic is =i.

i=qu=e=qä häwqa quäuqä=i
that=M=OBJ=POSS tail long=IND
Its tail is long.

nyi yŋŋä kukŋuä ä-t-qäqä i=qu i=qu=e=qä yoqä=i haquŋuä=i
1S bird speech ASSERT-say-PFV-1S/DSO that=M that=M=OBJ=POSS name=DEF haquŋuä=IND
The bird I've talked about, its name is haquŋuä.

Otherwise, the clitic is =nji:

n=qä aŋä=i m=ŋi=nji
1S=POSS house=DEF down=LOC=IND
My house is down there.

Polar questions, marked with the =ta clitic, are questions which can be answered with either of two choices. They usually come down to a “yes” or “no”:

Matinä=k=ta=nä
Martin=2S=PQ=QUOT
“Are you Martin?”

However, those two alternatives can be anything:

eqä ak=qu=e hŋ=qu=e mända
water same=M=OBJ INDEF=M=OBJ beyond
Was it the same river or one beyond?

Content questions, or wh–questions, are most frequently marked with the clitic =wä, but in some cases, one may come across the indicative =i or the much more limited clitic =kä. Content questions are characterized by the fact that they do not limit the answer to a binary choice.

An example of a content question is:

qe äŋgi=ŋqä-wä
2D where=GT=WH.Q
Where are you two (going)?

Dubitative mood constructions use the clitic =ti. They express a speaker's lack of knowledge or certainty on a given topic.

i=qu ämaqä naqä=qu=ti
that=M person big=M=DUB
Is he an important person, I wonder.

aŋä=i tä=qu=e=qä=ti
house=that this=M=OBJ=POSS=DUB
I wonder (I do not know) whose house this is.

=== Verbs ===
Verbs are bound forms, meaning they cannot occur in isolation. Morphologically, they are the most complex word class.

A verb may be marked by two sets of prefixes and up to seven suffixes. The prefixes indicate the polarity of assertion and, in the case of most transitive verbs, encode the person and number of the affected animate referent. The suffixes convey a range of grammatical information, including valency, tense, aspect, modality, the person and number of the actor, as well as relational affixes that connect the verb to the following clause.

Menya exhibits verb serialization, where two verb roots are compounded to form a complex stem. This process is limited in that only up to two verbs can be combined, and the second verb must be a verb of motion. See the example below:

ne quea qe ä-t-qäma-n-miŋ-qäqu=i
1P story CERT ASSERT-say-remain-DETR-PST/IPFV-1P/DSO=IND
…we remained there telling stories.

One type of verbs, the so-called final verbs, are forms inflected for tense, past or present. They occur primarily in the last clause of a sentence, where the mood clitic is appended. There are three degrees of past tense: near past (within 2–3 days), past (up to 10 years ago), and remote past (more than 10 years ago). Furthermore, the primary aspect distinction is perfective (event as a whole) vs. imperfective (focus on internal complexity). Imperfective can be further subdivided into progressive (developing/repeated through time) and stative (continuing without change)

Another subcategory of verbs is that of medial verbs. These are non-finite forms—that is, lacking tense and mood—that indicate the relationship between clauses and whether the topical entity of the marked clause is the same or different from the following clause.

=== Noun phrases ===
==== Pronouns ====
Pronouns can be divided into three types: personal pronouns, demonstrative pronouns, and dyadic kin pronouns. Moreover, all nouns and pronouns can be the head of a phrase.

Personal pronouns, distinguish between the singular, dual, and plural numbers, as well as the first, second, and third persons. However, Menya does not differentiate between grammatical genders or make inclusive–exclusive distinctions in pronouns.

	singular	dual	plural
first	nyi	ye	ne
second	si	qe	he
third	ki	qe	qu

Speakers generally prefer to use demonstrative pronouns rather than the third-person singular ki. As for the third dual form, it has not been observed in the unmarked form, suggesting that it may be an extended use of the second person dual (“you two”).

In addition, these basic (i.e. unmarked) personal pronouns, there also exist two genitive and one emphatic form. Below is a table of all these forms along with their underlying composition.

	singular			dual			plural		
	1st pers.	2nd pers.	3rd pers.	1st pers.	2nd pers.	3rd pers.	1st pers.	2nd pers.	3rd pers.
basic	nyi	si	ki	ye	qe		ne	he	qu
genitive (=qä)	ŋqä	tqä	kiqä	yeqä	qeqä		neqä	hiqä	quwqä
genitive (=yaqä)	nyaqä	saqä	keyaqä	yeyaqä	queyaqä		neyaqä	heyaqä	quyaqä
emphatic (=uä)	näuä	täuä	kiuä	yäuä	qeuä		näuä	hiuä	quwä

Despite no discernible difference in native speaker evaluation or general usage, =qä forms are significantly more frequent than =yaqä forms, especially outside the first person.

Genitive pronouns are used to show possession. These words can either function as the pre-head possessor within a noun phrase or stand on their own.

ne=qä aŋä=m=ngqä qaŋä qe ä-wä-k-qäqu=i
1P=POSS house=unseen=GT walk CERT ASSERT-go.down-PST/PFV-1P/DSO=IND
…we walked down to our far away home(s).

aŋä n=ŋi n=yaqä=i
house level=LOC 1S=POSS=IND
Aŋä näŋi, nyaqe.

Seven demonstrative pronouns can be distinguished:

	near	far	indefinite	exactive
neutral	tä	i	hn	qä
level		n		
above		yä		
below		m		

Forms highlighted in blue are free morphemes, meaning they can stand alone. The remaining forms are bound morphemes and always need a clitic appended. When referring to humans, demonstratives usually take enclitics that can further encode class. These classes are: masculine (=qu), feminine (=i ~ =u), honorific (=pa), and diminutive (=pu ~ =su). The masculine is considered the default form in that it is used not only for male referents but also when gender is irrelevant. Honorific forms are mainly used when referring to older people, and the diminutive — to children.

Only subject noun phrases use unmarked demonstrative pronouns; personal pronouns, however, can serve as both subject and object arguments.

Dyadic kin pronouns combine specific familial relationship and therefore occur only dual and plural forms. They are constructed by combining a personal or demonstrative pronoun, a kin pronoun root that defines the relationship, and an appropriate person–number clitic.

==== Nouns ====
The category of nouns is the most extensive. It can be divided into three sub-categories: simple, complex, and kin.

Basic nouns are single, monomorphemic units that denote a wide variety of entities, such as abstract concepts, concrete objects, and both common and proper names.

Complex nouns fall into three main groups: two-root compounds, verbal derivatives, and those combining a bound root with a seemingly archaic noun class suffix.

Although noun compounding was once a productive process, it is no longer active.

yämbuayä (“manioc”) ← yä (“tree) + buayä (“sweet potato”)
bequwäqä (“sweet potato leaf”) ← buayä + quwäqä (“leaf”)
yäquwqä (“leaf of a tree”) ← yä + quwqä (“leaf”)

Additionally, nouns can be formed from verbs using the –qä suffix. It's common to see this suffix used to derive a noun phrase's head from a verbal phrase or even a full clause.

Kinship terms in this language often show significant irregularities due to suppletion or allomorphic variation. For instance, the word for “my father” or “our father” uses a completely different root (ap–) than the word for "your father" or "his/her father," which uses the root −n− with a prefix to indicate the possessor. This means there's rarely a need for a first-person prefix, as the root itself changes to show possession by the first person.

Not all kin terms, however, fall into the subclass of kin nouns; indeed, some of the most frequently encountered kin relationships are denoted by basic nouns or phrases:

qokä: “man, male, husband”
apäkä: “woman, female, wife”

Noun phrases are capable of incorporating various elements such as adjectives (which permit the intensifier –näŋä), adpositional phrases, quantifiers, demonstratives, possessives, personalizing clitics, and ellipses.

Menya has multiple case-marking clitics, also known as role markers. These can indicate: time, location, goal, source, and association (comitative).

=== Modifiers ===
Adverbs and adjectives are a vague class. It is unclear whether they are separate classes, subclasses, or one class with semantically restricted usage of the words therein. For example, the word tnäŋä “hot, fast” can modify either nouns, like adjectives do, or verbs, like adverbs.

In noun phrases, modification generally follows the head noun, which is a deviation from Menya's dominant right-headed pattern (cf. genitives, which precede their head). In verbal phrases, however, the modifier comes before the head (the verb).

Nevertheless, the noun head can be omitted, leaving a modifier in the role of the phrase's head. Because of this, nouns could also be categorized as belonging to the same class as noun modifiers.

== Bibliography ==
- Whitehead, Carl R. (March 2006). A reference grammar of Menya, an Angan language of Papua New Guinea (PDF) (Ph.D.). University of Manitoba.
