= Susuami language =

Endangered Angan language of Manki, Papua New Guinea

Susuami
- Native to: Papua New Guinea
- Region: Upper Watut valley, Morobe Province
- Native speakers: (10 cited 2000)
- Language family: Trans–New Guinea: Angan; Northeast; Susuami

Language codes
- ISO 639-3: ssu
- Glottolog: susu1251
- ELP: Susuami
- Susuami is classified as Critically Endangered by the UNESCO Atlas of the World's Languages in Danger.
- Coordinates: 7.203594°S 146.540389°E

The Susuami language is a heavily endangered Angan language, spoken in the resettlement village of Manki (7.203594°S 146.540389°E) along the upper Watut River, Morobe Province, Papua New Guinea.

== Demographics ==
In 1980, it was estimated at 50 speakers, and faced competition from the several other languages spoken in the village, including distantly-related Hamtai and Angaataha, as well as the usual use of Tok Pisin with outsiders.

In 1990, there are about a dozen speakers, and children were not learning the language, including the child of the only couple in the village who were both native speakers. Its continued survival is unlikely.
