= Simbari language =

Angan language of Papua New Guinea

Simbari
- Pronunciation: [t͡səᵐbɑɡ͡ʟ̝ʌ]
- Native to: Papua New Guinea
- Region: Eastern Highlands, Gulf provinces
- Ethnicity: Simbari
- Native speakers: (3,000 cited 1990 census)
- Language family: Trans–New Guinea: Angan; Northwest; Simbari

Language codes
- ISO 639-3: smb
- Glottolog: simb1255

Simbari or Chimbari is an Angan language of Papua New Guinea.

There are at least two dialects of Simbari. The Simbari language is partly cognate with Baruya.

Simbari is spoken by the Simbari people. Simbari culture and society have received extensive anthropological studies, especially by Gilbert Herdt.

== See also ==
- Sambia Sexual Culture

== Bibliography ==
Phonological sketches

- Lloyd, Richard G. 1973a. The Angan language family. In: Franklin (ed.), 31–110.
- Lloyd, Richard G. 1973b. The Angan language family: Neighbouring languages. In: Franklin (ed.), 93–94.
