= AAK =

Aak or AAK may refer to:

== Organizations ==
- AarhusKarlshamn (operating as AAK), a Swedish producer of vegetable oils and fats
- Ajnad al-Kavkaz, a Chechen-led militia in the Syrian Civil War
- Alliance for the Future of Kosovo, an alliance of political parties in Kosovo
- Architectural Association of Kenya
- Armée de l'Air Khmère (Khmer Air Force, the air force of the Khmer Republic)
- Automobile Association of Kenya

== Other uses ==
- Aak, a genre of Korean court music
- Aak flower, madar or crown flower, common name of Calotropis gigantea
- AAK Theory, a mathematical theory relating rational functions with singular values
- Ankave language, a language of Papua New Guinea
- Aranuka Airport in Gilbert Islands, Kiribati (IATA airport code AAK)
