= Baruya =

Baruya may refer to:

- Baruya people, a tribe in the highlands of Papua New Guinea
- Baruya language, a variety of the Yipma language
