= SRSP =

SRSP may refer to:

- Sarhad Rural Support Programme, a non-governmental organization working to alleviate poverty in Pakistan
- Scottish Republican Socialist Party, a political party of Scotland
- Sexuality Research and Social Policy, an academic journal
- Somali Revolutionary Socialist Party, a political party of Somalia which supported Siad Barre
