= Lamari River =

Lamari
- Location within Papua New Guinea

Physical characteristics
- Mouth
  - location: Purari River basin
  - coordinates: 6°54′00″S 145°25′00″E

The Lamari River is a river that originates in the Kratke Range in the south central highlands of Eastern Highlands Province of Papua New Guinea. It flows into the Purari River basin.

== Population ==
Awa speaking indigenous people populate the Lamari river basin. The Lamari River serves as the demarcation line between the Kukukuku people and their neighbours to the north-west, the Fore people.
