= Kome Rural LLG =

Local-level government in Papua New Guinea

- Location within Papua New Guinea
- Coordinates: 7.216913°S 146.020987°E
- Country: Papua New Guinea
- Province: Morobe Province
- Time zone: UTC+10 (AEST)

Kome Rural LLG is a local-level government (LLG) of Morobe Province, Papua New Guinea.

== Wards ==
- 01. Engati
- 02. Tsewi (Kamasa language and Kawacha language speakers)
- 03. Umba
- 04. Engiapa
- 05. Jipa
- 06. Menya
- 07. Yakwe
- 08. Longwi
- 09. Ilbale
- 10. Kwaplalim
- 11. Helolpa
- 12. Kenoli
- 13. Wanagapali
- 14. Hatingli
- 15. Ikumdi
- 16. Menyamya Station
