= Kamasa language =

Nearly extinct language in Papua New Guinea

Kamasa
- Native to: Papua New Guinea
- Region: Morobe Province
- Native speakers: 7 (2003)
- Language family: Trans–New Guinea: Angan; Northeast; Kamasa

Language codes
- ISO 639-3: klp
- Glottolog: kama1360
- ELP: Kamasa
- Kamasa is classified as Critically Endangered by the UNESCO Atlas of the World's Languages in Danger.
- Coordinates: 7.046688°S 146.152479°E

Kamasa is a nearly extinct Angan language of Morobe Province, Papua New Guinea. It is spoken in Katsiong village (7.046688°S 146.152479°E), Tsewi ward, Kome Rural LLG.
