= Kratke Range =

Mountain range in Papua New Guinea

- Location within Papua New Guinea

Highest point
- Peak: Mount Tabletop
- Elevation: 3,686 m (12,093 ft)

Geography
- State: Papua New Guinea
- Range coordinates: 6.5°S 145.8333333°E
- Parent range: Island of New Guinea

Kratke Range (German: Krätkegebirge) is a mountain range in Eastern Highlands, Papua New Guinea. Several rivers, including Aziana, Yaiga, Lamari and Ramu originate from the mountain.

== History ==
In November 1889, Hugo Zöller became the first European to enter the Kratke Range from the former German colony Kaiser-Wilhelmsland in German New Guinea during an expedition to the Finisterre Range. He then called it Krätkegebirge, after the governor of German colony, Reinhold Kraetke (1845-1934). Kratke Range was only explored after the German colonial era at the beginning of the 1920s.

== Geography ==
Kratke Range runs south of the Finisterre mountains on the other side of the river Markham and joins the Bismarck Range to the east. One of the peaks is called Zöllerberg after Hugo Zöller. The highest peak is Mount Tabletop with 3.686 m height. The mountain is volcanic in nature and is overgrown by tropical mountain rainforest. Above 3,000 m, alpine grasslands predominate. Various endemic bird species live in the mountain such as the Modest tiger parrot.

== See also ==
- Kratke Range languages
