= Eastern Highlands – Kratke Range languages =

PNG Languages

Eastern Highlands – Kratke Range
- Geographic distribution: Morobe Province and Eastern Highlands Province, Papua New Guinea
- Linguistic classification: Trans–New Guinea: Eastern Highlands – Kratke Range
- Subdivisions: Kainantu–Goroka (Eastern Highlands); Angan (Kratke Range)

Language codes
- Glottolog: None
- Eastern Highlands – Kratke Range and Finisterre–Huon languages Other Trans–New Guinea languages Other Papuan languages Austronesian languages Uninhabited

The Eastern Highlands – Kratke Range languages form a branch of the Trans–New Guinea language family of New Guinea in the classification of Timothy Usher. It unites the Kainantu–Goroka (Eastern Highlands) and Angan (Kratke Range) languages:

- Eastern Highlands (Kainantu–Goroka, Eastern Highlands Province)
- Kratke Range (Angan, southeastern Morobe Province)
