= Kotidanga Rural LLG =

Local-level government in Papua New Guinea

- Location within Papua New Guinea
- Coordinates: 7.57°S 145.89°E
- Country: Papua New Guinea
- Province: Gulf Province

Area
  - Total: 2,237.6 km^{2} (863.9 sq mi)

Population (2011 census)
  - Total: 45,385
  - Density: 20.283/km^{2} (52.532/sq mi)
- Time zone: UTC+10 (AEST)

Kotidanga Rural LLG is a local-level government (LLG) of Gulf Province, Papua New Guinea.

== Wards ==
- 01. Kanabea
- 02. Ipaiyu
- 03. Manimango
- 04. Wemawa
- 05. Komako
- 06. Kwaiyu
- 07. Bu'u
- 08. Pio (Tainae language speakers)
- 09. Ania (Tainae language speakers)
- 10. Aminauwa
- 11. M'bauya
- 12. Ivandu
- 13. Hawakabia
- 14. Kamina
- 15. Tiawa
- 16. Paina
- 17. Meiwari
- 18. Kutumbaiwa
- 19. Kotidanga
- 20. Ipaea
