= Kawacha language =

Endangered Angan language of Papua New Guinea

Kawatsa
- Native to: Papua New Guinea
- Region: Morobe Province
- Ethnicity: Ethnic population: 160 (2000 census)
- Native speakers: (12 cited 2000)
- Language family: Trans–New Guinea: Angan; Northeast; Kawatsa

Language codes
- ISO 639-3: kcb
- Glottolog: kawa1276
- ELP: Kawacha
- Kawacha is classified as Critically Endangered by the UNESCO Atlas of the World's Languages in Danger.
- Coordinates: 7.046688°S 146.152479°E

Kawatsa is a nearly extinct Angan language of Papua New Guinea. According to one source, an estimated 12 people are believed to speak the language. It is spoken in Katsiong village (7.046688°S 146.152479°E), Tsewi ward, Kome Rural LLG.
