= Simbari people =

Tribal group in Papua New Guinea

Simbari
Regions with significant populations
- Papua New Guinea (Eastern Highlands Province)

Languages
- Simbari

Religion
- Christianity and traditional religion

The Simbari people (also known as the Simbari Anga, called Sambia by Herdt) are a mountain-dwelling, hunting and horticultural tribal people who inhabit the fringes of the Eastern Highlands Province of Papua New Guinea.

The Sambia – a pseudonym created by anthropologist Gilbert Herdt – are known by cultural anthropologists for their historical practice of "ritualised homosexuality" and semen ingestion practices among pre-pubescent boys. The practice occurred due to Simbari belief that semen is necessary for male growth. Simbari practice did not appear to affect male sexual orientation. Nearly all males are happy to move on to relationships with women once permitted. A small minority of males remain bachelors and continue to engage in homosexual relations, and are considered unusual and ridiculed by other tribesmen. In recent decades, traditional practices, such as boy insemination and a hierarchical and antagonistic view towards women, have ended in favor of schooling and more equal relationships between men and women.

The Simbari people speak Simbari, a Trans-New Guinea language belonging to the Angan branch.

== Traditional practices and beliefs ==
=== Initiation ===
The full initiation is reported to start with boys being removed from their mothers at the age of seven. This process is not always voluntary and can involve threats of death. The children are then beaten and stabbed in their nostrils with sticks to make them bleed. In the next stage, the children are hit with stinging nettles. The boys are then dressed in ritual clothing, and an attempt is made to force them to suck on ritual flutes. The boys are then taken to a Temple, and older boys dance in front of them, making sexual gestures. Once it gets darker, the younger boys are taken to the dancing ground, where they are expected to perform fellatio on the older boys.

=== Male rites of passage ===
1. Maku: This is the first rite of passage for the boys. They are separated from their mothers at this stage and participate in bloodletting (where long sticks are inserted up their nostrils to make them bleed), therefore ridding themselves of their mothers' presence in them. The Simbari people do not believe that males are born with semen and so, during Maku, the boys participate in fellatio. They are also required to undergo a strict diet during this time period, which is from age 7–10.
2. Imbutu: This stage is filled with camaraderie, male bonding, and rewards for making it through the first set of Rites.
3. Ipmangwi: During this stage, the boys begin to go through puberty, and they no longer need to participate in fellatio. They also learn gender roles and how to have intercourse. Once they have learned this, they look for a wife and marry during this stage. It lasts for three years as well, during the ages 13–16.
4. Nupusha: During this stage, the males get married and have intercourse. This stage happens only after the others have been completed, and they must be at least 16 years old.
5. Taiketnyi: The males undergo bloodletting again during this stage, as their wives have their first menstrual cycle as married women.
6. Moondung: This stage is when the women give birth to their first child. This is the final step and signifies completion of the Rites of passage. They can now be considered full-grown, respectable men.

=== Gender roles and sexuality ===
The Simbari people believe in the necessity of gender roles within their culture. Relationships between men and women of all ages are complex, with many rules and restrictions. For example, boys are removed from their mothers at age seven to strip them of contact with their mothers. They even perform a bloodletting ritual on the boys following isolation from their mothers to rid them of their mother's blood from within them, which is viewed as contaminated. This separation is due to men's fear of women, as they are taught from a young age about the women's ability to emasculate and manipulate men. The women possess what the Simbari call a tingu, through which they use their manipulation skills. To combat the women's sorcery, the men go through rites of passage, in which they learn to safely have intercourse with women without becoming metaphorically trapped. The women are also separated from the men when they are menstruating. During this time, they stay in the "menarche hut" because of the belief that the women's powers are strengthened during this time.

Pre-pubescent boys are required to perform fellatio on older males and swallow the semen because it is believed that "without this 'male milk' they will fail to mature properly". Upon reaching adulthood, men marry and engage in heterosexual behavior, initially requiring their brides to fellate them and later perform penis-in-vagina sexual intercourse. Homosexual behavior past this point is rare.

== Modernisation ==
In 2006, Gilbert Herdt updated his 1999 publication of his studies of the Simbari with the publication of The Simbari: Ritual, Sexuality, and Change in Papua New Guinea. He noted that a sexual revolution had overtaken the Simbari in the previous decade. "To go from absolute gender segregation and arranged marriages, with universal ritual initiation that controlled sexual and gender development and imposed the radical practice of boy-insemination, to abandoning initiation, seeing adolescent boys and girls kiss and hold hands in public, arranging their own marriages, and building square houses with one bed for the newlyweds, as the Simbari have done, is revolutionary."

Several factors contributed to the slow decline and then abandonment of the traditional rituals, followed by the revolutionary changes to sexual expression among the Simbari. In the 1960s, the Australian government's forced cessation of perpetual tribal warfare in Papua New Guinea eventually led to a significant altering of male identity and the warrior culture that had long sustained their initiation rituals. Immigration, beginning in the late 1960s, also contributed to change, as tribal members began to leave the highlands to work on coastal cocoa, copra, and rubber plantations. This exposed the Simbari to the outside world, with its fast food, alcohol, sex with female sex workers, western goods, and money. With the passage of time, it would contribute to the ideas of romance and marriage as a team of equals, rather than the traditional hierarchical antagonistic model.

Schools – both governmental and missionary – were introduced into the Simbari Valley in the 1970s. Rather quickly, Herdt reports, “schools began to displace initiation as a primary means for gaining access to valued positions within the expanding society.” Education was co-ed, which not only increased women's social standing, but for the first time in Simbari society, the genders were mixed in an intimate space prior to marriage. Increasing contact with the outside world led to the appearance of material goods, which undermined the local economy and traditional masculinity, no longer achieved through the production of local goods (such as bows and arrows).

Christian missions also factored in the change through their introduction of schools, material goods, and foreign foods. Missionaries preached against the shamans, the practice of polygyny, and the boy initiations, shaming Simbari elders who still advocated traditional activities. Seventh-day Adventist missionaries had a strong presence among the Simbari, introducing Levitical dietary restrictions, which dramatically altered the indigenous diet, since pigs and possum – “unclean animals” – were no longer hunted. Thus, one of the major social and political activities for Simbari men – hunting – was abolished among the Adventist converts.

All of these developments contributed to the sexual revolution among the Simbari. The cessation of war, changes in opportunities for women via schooling, exposure to the outside world with its ideas (via immigration, new government, and missionaries), along with the changes in the economy in trade goods, food procurement, and the cessation of one social activity (hunting) with substitution of a new industry (coffee trees) which changed traditional roles (men: hunting, women: agriculture) so that men and women now became co-workers together in their gardens (perhaps “the first time in Simbari history that gender cooperation has been attempted”). All of this set the stage for the rise in the 1990s of the “Love Marriage,” where young people chose their own mates, without any need to go through forced separation from family and obligatory homoerotic initiations (which had died out in the 1980s) or to have parents arrange marriages.

== See also ==
- Etoro people
- Sambia Sexual Culture
- LGBT rights in Papua New Guinea
- Güevedoce, (Simbari: kwolu-aatmwol), a kind of intersexuality also present among the Simbari.
