= Akoye language =

Angan language spoken in Papua New Guinea

Akoye
- Lohiki
- Native to: Papua New Guinea
- Region: Morobe Province
- Native speakers: (600 cited 2001)
- Language family: Trans–New Guinea: Angan; Southwest; Akoye–Tainae; Akoye

Language codes
- ISO 639-3: miw
- Glottolog: akoy1238
- ELP: Akoye

Akoye, also known as Lohiki or Maihiri (Mai-Hea-Ri), is an Angan language of Papua New Guinea.

== Phonology ==
Akoye has a small phonemic inventory, which is not well described.

Consonants are /p t k, f s, m n, w/ and maybe /j/. The first four are usually voiced to [b ɾ ɡ v] after a monophthongal vowel, though sometimes the voicing is blocked for unknown reasons.

Consonants
	Labial	Alveolar	Velar
Nasal	m	n	
Plosive	p	t	k
Fricative	f	s	
Approximant	w		

Vowels are /i e ə ɑ o u/. Diphthongs (/ɑi, əi, oi, ɑu/) are said to be rare, though vowel sequences are common, so these are perhaps not equivalent.

	Front	Central	Back
Close	i		u
Mid	e	ə	o
Open			ɑ

The most complex syllable is CCVV: /mtəəpə/ 'hair', /əəkwɑi/ 'eye'.

Tone plays a role: /ə̀ɡənə/ 'sky', /əɡə́nə/ 'lid'; /pɑɑ́/ (sp. bird), /pɑ̀ɑ/ 'body'.
