= Tainae language =

Angan language spoken in Papua New Guinea

Tainae
- Ivori
- Native to: Papua New Guinea
- Region: Gulf Province
- Native speakers: (1,000 cited 1991)
- Language family: Trans–New Guinea: Angan; Southwest; Akoye–Tainae; Tainae

Language codes
- ISO 639-3: ago
- Glottolog: tain1253

Tainae is an Angan language of Gulf Province, Papua New Guinea. Famba (7.506365°S 145.811363°E, Paiguna, and Pio (7.504143°S 145.795808°E) of Kotidanga Rural LLG are the main villages.

A grammatical sketch of Tainae was written by Carlson (1991).

== Phonology ==
Consonants
	Labial	Alveolar	Velar	Glottal
Plosive	p	t d	k	ʔ
Fricative	f	s		h
Nasal	m	n		

- Unvoiced consonants are voiced intervocalically or when adjacent to a voiced consonant.
- /d/ is unvoiced [t] when following another consonant.
- /k/ is palatalized [kʲ] after /i/, and labialized [kʷ] adjacent to /u/.

Vowels
	Front	Central	Back
High	i	ɨ	u
Mid	e		o
Low		a	

Additionally, the following diphthongs can be found: /ai/, /ae/, /ao/, /au/, /oi/.

Stress is usually penultimate, unless that syllable contains /ɨ/, in which case stress moves leftwards to the first syllable that does not contain /ɨ/.
