= Safeyoka language =

Angan language spoken in Papua New Guinea

Safeyoka
- Ampale
- Native to: Papua New Guinea
- Region: Morobe Province
- Native speakers: (2,390 cited 1980 census)
- Language family: Trans–New Guinea: Angan; Northeast; Safeyoka

Language codes
- ISO 639-3: apz
- Glottolog: safe1240

Safeyoka, or Ampale, is an Angan language of Papua New Guinea. Other names of this language include Ambari, Ampeeli, Ampeeli-Wojokeso, and Ampele. According to a 1980 census, there were around 2,390 native speakers. Commonly known as Ampale, the dialect is called Wojokeso. Speakers of Ampale range from the Waffa River to the Banir River, which is located in the northern part of Papua New Guinea. The Wojokeso dialect is spoken by people who live in five villages where multiple districts, the Kaiapit, Mumeng and Menyama come together in the Morobe Province.

== Phonology ==
Consonants
	Labial	Alveolar	Palatal		Velar		Glottal	
	Labial	Alveolar	plain	labial	plain	labial	plain	labial
Plosive	p	t	tɕ	tɕʷ	k	kʷ	ʔ	
Fricative	f	s	ɕ	ɕʷ			h	hʷ
Nasal	m	n	ɲ		ŋ	ŋʷ		
Approximant	w	r	j	ɥ				

- /p t k/ are voiced /b d g/ following homorganic nasals.
- /f/ is voiced [v~β] intervocalically.
- The sequences /hm hn/ are realized as [m̥ n̥].
- /h/ is in free variation with [x], and can optionally be pronounced [ɣ] intervocalically.
- /r/ manifests as [ɺ] utterance-initially.

Vowels
	Front	Back
High	i	u
Mid	e	ʌ
Low	æ	ɑ

- /i/ and /u/ are both reduced to [ɨ] when unstressed.

Safeyoka is also tonal, distinguishing between high and low tone.

== Grammar ==
=== Subject Personal Pronouns ===
In the term stem of Ampale outlines, the object person affixes are included in them. Class 2 verb roots, /put/ and /kill/, they occur immediately following the root. Other verb roots immediately come before the root. Object person affixes include:

	Singualr	Dual	Plural
1st Person	nɨ-	e-	naa-/ne-
2nd Person	kɨ-	ze-	ze-
3rd Person	u-	u-	u-

=== Sentence Structure ===
The Ampale language classifies with the Wojokeso dialect of the Angan language stock. According to B.A Hooley and K.A. McElhanon, the language is referred to as the "Languages of the Morobe District - New Guinea". The sentence types of the Wojokeso are pattern types. On non-final verbs, the Wojokeso links clauses together by the means of affixes or clitics.

==== Simple ====
The simple sentence formula is "+ Base: General Clause/Elliptical Clause + Terminal: Final Intonation." The sentence is explained by a single base and final intonation. In other words, the single base is expounded by the general clause. Single base moods include: Indicative, Interrogative, Dubitative, Information interrogative, Avolitional, and Exclamatory.

Single Bases	Example
General Clause 1 = Indicative	Hofɨko pmmalofo-foho they came 'They came'
General Clause 1 = Indicative	mmalofo'maho come 'They didn't come.'
General Clause 2 = Interrogative	Nto pmmalofotaho already came 'Did they already come?'
General Clause 2 = Interrogative	Mapɨ'njitaho; NEG-come' 'Didn't they come?'
General Clause 3 = Dubitative	Pmmalofotɨkeno come-they 'Maybe they came'
General Clause 3 = Dubitative	Mapɨ'njitɨkeno come-maybe 'Maybe they didn't come'
General Clause 4 = Information Interrogative	Tɨhwo pmmalofoto who came 'Who came?'
General Clause 4 = Information Interrogative	Tɨhwo mapɨ'njito who NEG-came 'Who didn't come?'
General Clause 5 = Avolitional	Pɨfɨtnnoho come-they 'It's not good that they come.' Poyo imo'ntnnoho dead become-you 'It's not good that you die.'
General Clause 6 = Exclamatory	Yahufohi pig 'It's a pig!' Peho'no pohinopu why come-you 'Shame on you for coming!'

=== Series ===
The series sentence indicates multiple actions a person does. There is no grammatical distinction between temporal succession and temporal overlap. Usually used to explain actions which are performed by a dual or plural subject. However, actions with this partial change in subject may also be classified as a sequence sentence.

=== Sequence ===
The sequence sentence indicates an order of actions being completed by a subject, where base 1 differs from base 2. The action of the first base is usually completed before the action of the second base even begins. The deep structure of this sentence type is that it is purely based on succession.

Example:

"Sɨkuno nomeHONƗNGKI sukwo'miyomo hofantiso toho nelofAHONƗNGKI"

This translates into "Darkness came and night mosquitoes bit us". This expresses temporal succession.

=== Tense ===
Future
	Wojokeso	English
Subjective	y-ontɨfitnne	They would, they will do
Unrealized Subjective	y-ontɨtinnesohilo	Would have done
Near Future	u-y-on ɨtfeho	They will do
Hortative-Imperative	u-y-ɨfe	Let them do it

Non-Future
	Wojokeso	English
Present Incomplete	y-alowofo	They are doing it
Present Complete	y-ohofo	They did it
Narrative Past	humi-y-ohofi	They did it
Near Past	i-malofo	They did it
Far Past	i-mentohofo	They did it a long time ago
Habitual Past	i-motofo	They used to do it regularly
