= National Sexuality Resource Center =

San Franciscan sex-positive organization

The National Sexuality Resource Center (NSRC) is a San Francisco-based organization which advocates the positive representation of human sexuality, creates educational content, and provides training about human sexuality. The center also counters what it views as negative representations of sexuality while fostering dialog of sexuality issues as a natural part of being human.

NSRC opened in 2003 and is directed by Gilbert Herdt, an anthropologist who pioneered the cross-cultural study of sexuality. He authored Guardians of the Flute, an examination of sexual rituals in New Guinea. The center is affiliated with San Francisco State University and is supported through the Ford Foundation's Global Dialogue on Sexuality.

NSRC activities have included an Internet-based "sexual literacy campaign" called SexLiteracy.org, the University Consortium for Sexuality Research and Training, an annual Summer Institute, and the Sexual Health Literacy Project in partnership with College of the Redwoods in Eureka, California.

In 2006, NSRC hosted the first annual Champions of Sexual Literacy Awards commemorating former Surgeon General David Satcher's call to action on sexual health and "responsible sexual behavior". Awardees were thinkMTV, actor BD Wong, former Surgeon General Joycelyn Elders, Bernard Goldstein, and Anke Ehrhardt of the HIV Center at Columbia University.

NSRC publishes the journal Sexuality Research and Social Policy. The Center has also published the magazine American Sexuality.
