= Angu =

Tribal peoples from Papua New Guinea

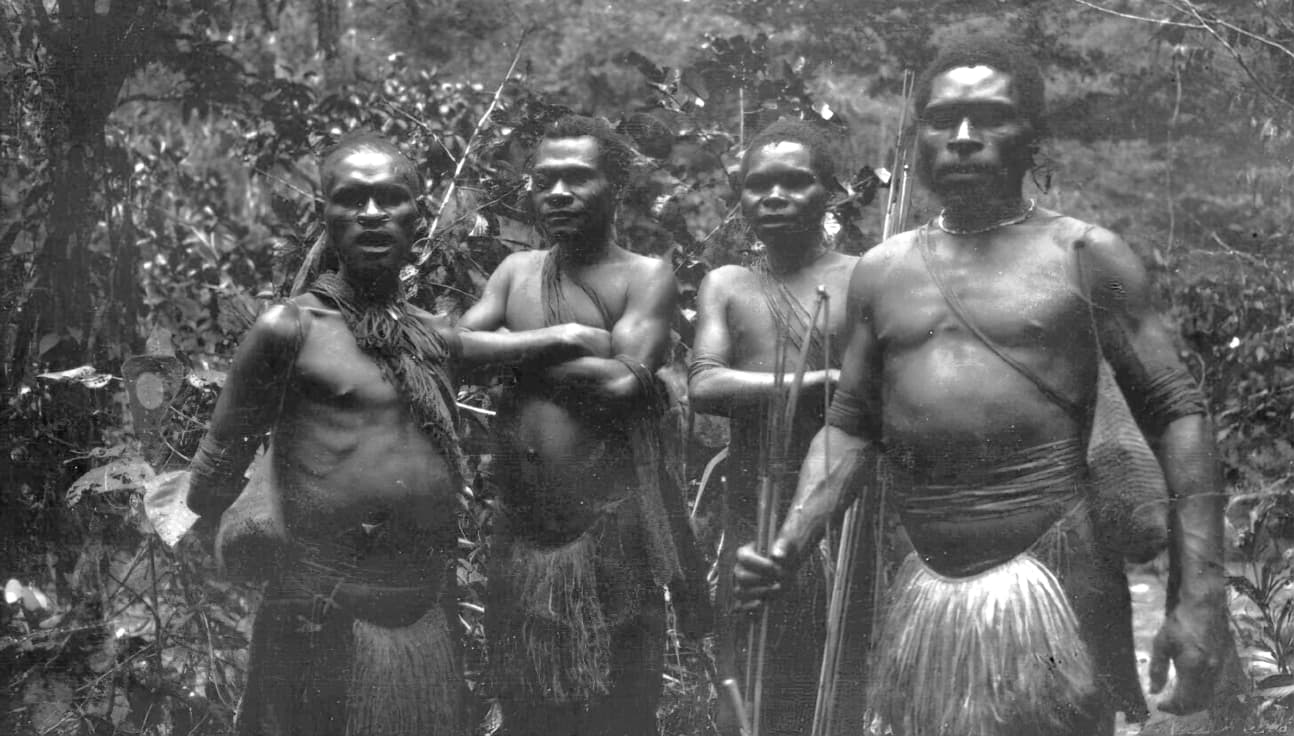
Kukukuku men, 1931

The Angu or Änga people, previously called Kukukuku (pronounced "cookah-cookah"), are a small group speaking a number of related languages and living mainly in the high, mountainous region of southern Eastern Highlands Province, south-western Morobe Province, and north-eastern Gulf Province of Papua New Guinea. Even though they are a short people, often less than five feet tall, they were feared for their violent raids on more peaceful villages living in lower valleys.

An account of some of the first contact between the Angu and westerners is described vividly by J. K. McCarthy in his 1963 book Patrol into Yesterday: My New Guinea Years. At the time, despite the high altitude and cold climate of their homeland, the Änga wore limited clothing, including grass skirts, with a piece similar to a sporran, and cloaks made from beaten bark, called mals.

Today, four of the Änga languages are almost extinct, but the largest tribe, the Hamtai, are thriving, with a population of 45,000.

Some Aseki district tribes have become a tourist attraction due to their smoked mummies. There are three famous mummy sites around Aseki in the Hamtai territory. The Hamtai people now have a small income from charging scientists, tourists and photographers a fee before entrance to the mummy sites. Although it is unclear when their practice of mummification began, it ended in 1949 with the arrival of missionaries.

== First contact with the Toulambi ==
A film by Jean-Pierre Dutilleux purports to show first contact between a group of Toulambi, reportedly a part of the Angu People, and White people in December 1993. It has been accused of being staged by anthropologist Pierre Lemonnier, who claims a first-hand relationship with the tribe. Lemonnier, however, was sued for defamation and lost the case.

A first contact between the Toulambi tribe was also reported in The Sydney Morning Herald on 22 October 1993, not long before the meeting with Dutilleux:

Government officials in Papua New Guinea say they have discovered another 'lost tribe' [...] The latest group, dubbed the Toulambi tribe, apparently was discovered in a remote area of thick jungle in the Papua New Guinea Highlands... Two near-naked members of the tribe were 'scared to death' when taken by a hunting party to the nearest government station to taste store food and view white men and aeroplanes for the first time... But some people remain sceptical. They believe the group may belong to known isolated border tribes but have been left off the latest census.
