= Sambia Sexual Culture =

1999 book by Gilbert Herdt

Sambia Sexual Culture: Essays from the Field
- Cover
- Author: Gilbert Herdt
- Language: English
- Subject: Sambia people
- Publisher: University of Chicago Press
- Publication date: 1999
- Publication place: United States
- Media type: Print (Hardcover and Paperback)
- Pages: 327
- ISBN: 0-226-32752-3

Sambia Sexual Culture: Essays from the Field is a 1999 book by the anthropologist Gilbert Herdt. The book received negative reviews.

== Summary ==
Herdt discusses Simbari culture. His work is influenced by the philosopher Michel Foucault.

Over a span of 20 years and 13 field trips, Herdt studied the intricate relationship between sexuality, ritual, and gender within Sambia society, particularly in the context of their warfare and gender segregation practices.

The essays delve into various aspects of Sambia sexual culture, including fetish and fantasy, ritual practices like nose-bleeding, and the practice of homoerotic insemination.

Herdt also examines the roles of both fathers and mothers in identity formation and the concept of a "third sex" within Sambia culture. Additionally, he critiques how homosexuality has been represented in cross-cultural literature, highlighting how western models have often skewed the understanding of non-western sexual desires.

== Publication history ==
Sambia Sexual Culture was first published in 1999 by the University of Chicago Press. In 2006, Gilbert Herdt updated his studies of the Simbari with the publication of The Simbari: Ritual, Sexuality, and Change in Papua New Guinea.
