= Sexuality Research and Social Policy =

- Discipline: Sexology
- Language: English
- Edited by: Christian Grov

Publication details
- History: 2004–present
- Publisher: Springer Science+Business Media
- Frequency: Quarterly

Standard abbreviations
- ISO 4: Sex. Res. Soc. Policy

Indexing
- ISSN: 1868-9884
- OCLC no.: 56322323

Links
- Journal homepage; Online archive

Sexuality Research and Social Policy is a peer-reviewed academic journal and an official journal of the National Sexuality Resource Center, published by Springer Science+Business Media. The journal covers research on human sexuality, including theoretical and methodological discussions about the implications of findings for policies regarding sexual health, sex education, and sexual rights in diverse communities. The journal also includes brief research and conference reports, white papers, book, film, and other reviews, along with guest editorials and commentaries. In 2016, he had a SJR ranking of 0,810.
