= Angaataha language =

Trans-New Guinea language of Papua New Guinea

Angaataha
- Native to: Papua New Guinea
- Region: Morobe Province
- Ethnicity: Angataaya
- Native speakers: 2,500 (2015)
- Language family: Trans–New Guinea: Angan; Angaataha
- Writing system: Latin script

Language codes
- ISO 639-3: agm
- Glottolog: anga1290

Angaataha (also known as Angaatiya, Angaatiha, or Langimar) is the most divergent of the Angan languages in the Trans-New Guinea language family. It is native to the Menyanya District of Morobe Province, Papua New Guinea. As of 2015 it was estimated that there were 2,500 speakers. Ethnic speakers of the region who speak Angaatiha are called Angaatiya. The status of the language is categorized as a level 5 developing language. Its ISO code is agm.

Like most languages spoken in Papua New Guinea, Angaatiha contains the subject-object-verb word order and utilizes the Latin script.

The Angaatiha language is notable for its usage of varying pragmatic sequencing dependent on whether a sentence contains temporal or logical information.

== Temporal and logical sequencing ==
The Angaatiha language features two forms of pragmatic sequencing, each respectively reserved for situations that require conveying temporal and logical information. Both temporal and logical sequencing have been described as having either "loose" and "tight" relationships between sentences. Much like that of the Kâte language, also spoken in the Morobe Province of Papua New Guinea, "tight" and "loose" sequencing in Angaatiha holds a relationship of "continuing pragmatic effects from one event to the next" versus "a lingering pragmatic effect that continues indefinitely".

== Sample text ==
Translated sample in Angaataha of the Book of Genesis of the Bible:

Angaatiha:

- Nsihi aimihuraari Autaahaatiho yamihapatuni yapipatuni ahaitantaihi kahapaamipipa nopisasinati ahontaise. Ahotihi Autaahaatihomi Itipiho kaiwaami autaahi ntaayataise. Iyataati nahataapipihi asihatamataise. Asihatamasihi Autaahaatiho santaase saasanetane tihi saasanentaise. Saasanetihi Autaahaatiho imonatati nkaatihi otapihaate ta ampihintaase. Iyati asihatintihanti yantihi apatihe ta ampihintaase. Iyati kaihi asisiha nsiha noaipataise. Aihi Autaahaatiho santaase waapoho natapaatati wo autaahi niyonihi wo yatihi noti nimantane ntaase. Tihi kiyati noaipataise. Aihi waapoho tipitapaatimpipihapi yamihapate ta ampihintaase. Aihi siyati kaihi asisiha kapiha sanausotaise.

English:

- "In the beginning God created heaven and earth. The earth was formless and empty, and darkness covered the deep water. The spirit of God was hovering over the water. Then God said, "Let there be light!" So there was light. God saw the light was good. So God separated the light from the darkness. God named the light "day", and the darkness he named "night". There was evening, then morning, the first day. Then God said, "Let there be a horizon in the middle of the water in order to separate the water". So God made the horizon and separated the water above and below the horizon. And so it was. God named what was above the horizon "sky". There was evening, then morning, a second day."
