= Ankave language =

Language

Ankave
- Region: Kerema District, Gulf Province, Papua New Guinea
- Native speakers: 1,500 (2014)
- Language family: Trans–New Guinea: Angan; Southwest; Ankave
- Writing system: Latin

Language codes
- ISO 639-3: aak
- Glottolog: anka1246

Ankave or Angave is a Papuan language spoken by the approximately 1,500 (as of 2014) Angave people in Kerema District, Gulf Province, Papua New Guinea.

== History ==
In 1987, Ankave had approximately 1,600 speakers. In a 2014 estimate, however, Ankave only had about 1,500 speakers.

== Phonology ==
=== Vowels ===
| | Front | Central | Back |
|---|---|---|---|
| High | i | | u |
| Mid | e | ə | o |
| Low | | ɑ | |

Diphthongs: /iɑ eɑ ɑi oɑ/

=== Consonants ===
| | | Bilabial | Alveolar | Palatal | Velar | Glottal |
|---|---|---|---|---|---|---|
| Nasal | | m | n | | ŋ | |
| Plosive | voiceless | p | t | | k | ʔ |
| Plosive | prenasal | ᵐb | ⁿd | | ᵑɡ | |
| Affricate | prenasal | | ⁿdz | | | |
| Fricative | | | s | | x | |
| Flap | | | ɾ | | | |
| Semivowel | | | | j | w | |

== Writing system ==
An orthography using the Latin script has been developed for Angave, but less than 5% of its speakers are literate.

| A a | B b | D d | E e | G g | I i | Ɨ ɨ | J j | K k | X x | M m |
|---|---|---|---|---|---|---|---|---|---|---|
| /ɑ/ | /ᵐb/ | /ⁿd/ | /e/ | /ɡ/ | /i/ | /ə/ | /ⁿdz/ | /k/ | /x/ | /m/ |
| N n | Ŋ ŋ | O o | P p | R r | S s | T t | U u | W w | Y y | ´ |
| /n/ | /ŋ/ | /o/ | /p/ | /ɾ/ | /s/ | /t/ | /u/ | /w/ | /j/ | /ʔ/ |

== Notes ==
- Speece, Richard F. (1992). "Ankave Organised Phonology Data".
