= Gilbert Herdt =

American anthropologist (born 1949)

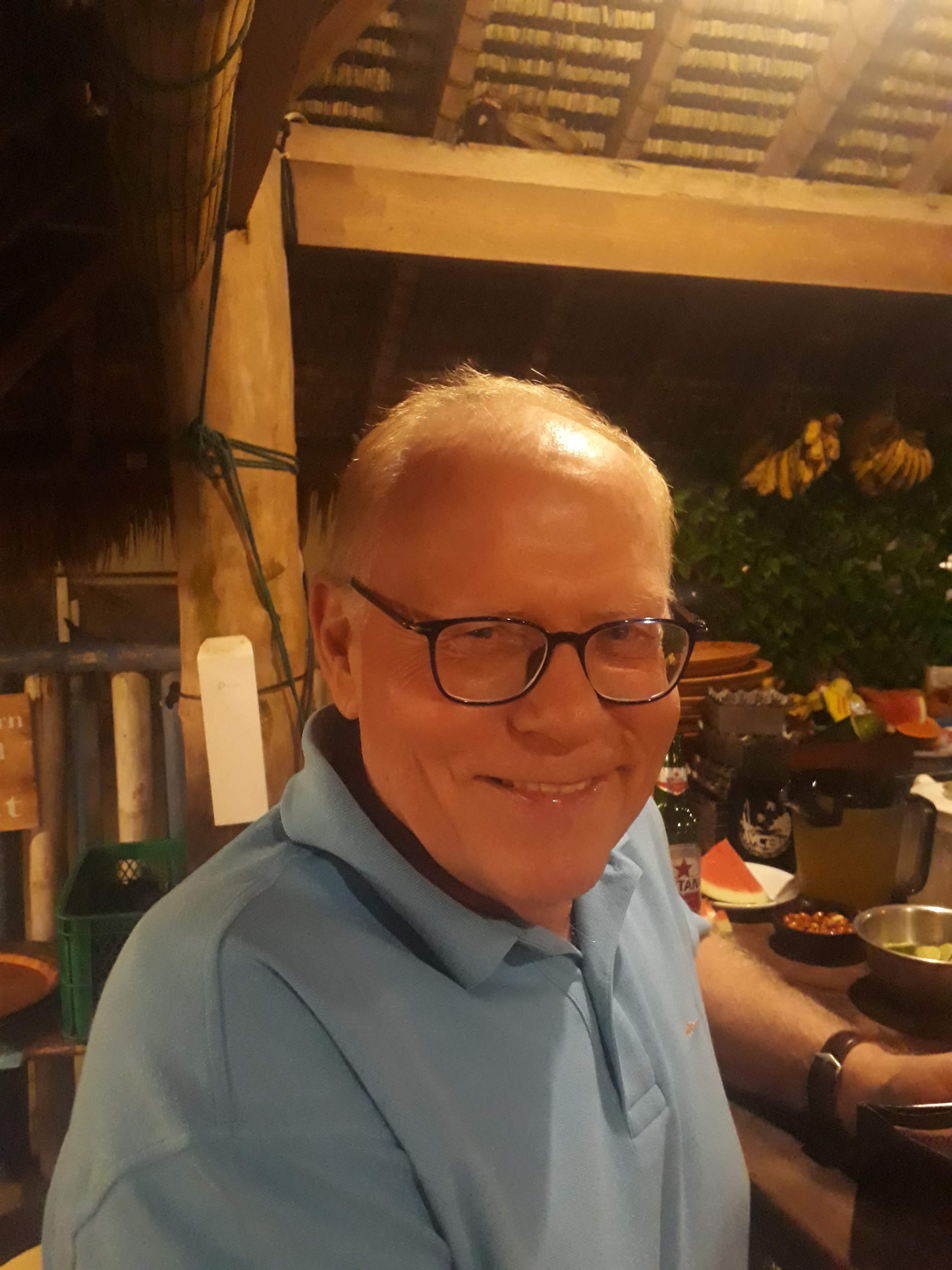
- Gilbert Herdt in 2019
- Born: February 24, 1949 (age 77)
- Citizenship: United States
- Education: University of Washington, Australian National University
- Scientific career
- Fields: Human Sexuality, Anthropology
- Workplaces: Stanford University, University of Chicago and others
- Academic advisors: Roger M. Keesing, Derek Freeman, Robert J. Stoller

Gilbert H. Herdt (born February 24, 1949) is Emeritus Professor of Human Sexuality Studies and Anthropology and a Founder of the Department of Sexuality Studies and National Sexuality Resource Center at San Francisco State University. He founded the Summer Institute on Sexuality and Society at the University of Amsterdam (1996). He founded the PhD Program in Human Sexuality at the California Institute for Integral Studies, San Francisco (2013). He conducted long term field work among the Sambia people of Papua New Guinea, and has written widely on the nature and variation in human sexual expression in Papua New Guinea, Melanesia, and across culture.

== Biography ==
Herdt is a research scholar, advocate for human sexuality, and a gay activist who has taught at Stanford University, the University of Chicago, the University of Amsterdam, and the University of Washington. In 2000, Herdt cofounded the Institute on Sexuality, Social Inequality and Health that studies all forms of sexuality and discrimination that affect community building, sexual culture and sexual health.

He specializes in the anthropology of sexuality, sexual orientation, sexual cultures, and the development of gender identity and sexual expression. His studies of the 'Sambia' people — a pseudonym he created — of Papua New Guinea analyzes how culture and society create sexual meanings and practices. The Sambia are unique in that in the past they require males to undergo three specific sexual phases in their lives. Boys must provide sexual service to young men, adolescents must then receive oral sex from boys, and males enter adulthood by becoming heterosexual.

Herdt also wrote about the binabinaaine of Kiribati and Tuvalu, describing how they are known for their performances and their ability to comment on the appearance and behaviour of Tuvaluan men. He also wrote that some Tuvaluans view binabinaaine as a "borrowing" from Kiribati, whence other "'undesirable' traits of Tuvaluan culture, like sorcery, are thought to have originated". He also described how, in Funafuti, young women are often friends with older binabinaaine.

In the United States, Herdt has also studied adolescents and their families, the emergence of HIV and gay culture, and the role that social policy plays in sexual health.

He has written and edited some 36 books, and more than 100 scientific papers. He is also the general editor of Worlds of Desire, and an associate editor of Journal of Culture, Sexuality, and Health, Journal of Men and Masculinities, and Transaction: Journal of Social Science and Modern Society.

== Awards ==
Herdt is the recipient of various awards and research grants, including:

- Pre-doctoral Fulbright Scholarship to Australia
- William Simon Henry Guggenheim Memorial Fellowship
- Fellow of American Anthropological Association, International Academy of Sex Research, and Royal Anthropological Institute (UK).

== Books ==
- 2014 Critical Terms for the Study of Gender editor with Catharine R. Stimpson. Chicago: University of Chicago Press
- 2013 Human Sexuality. First edition. (With Nicole Polen-Petit.) New York: McGraw-Hill.
- 2009 Moral Panics, Sex Panics. New York: NYU Press.
- 2007 21st Century Sexualities: Contemporary Issues in Health, Education, and Rights, editor with Cymene Howe. Routledge
- 2006 Sexual Inequalities and Social Justice, editor with Niels Teunis. Berkeley: University of California Press.
- 2006 The Sambia: Ritual, Sexuality and Change in Papua New Guinea. Second Edition. New York: Wadsworth.
- 2004 Gay and Lesbian Aging. (With Brian DeVries.) New York: Springer.
- 2001 Children of Horizons: how gay and lesbian teens are leading a new way out of the closet, editor with author Andrew Boxer. Beacon Press
- 2001 Secrecy and Cultural Reality. Ann Arbor: University of Michigan Press
- 2000 Something to Tell You: The Road Families Travel When a Child Is Gay. New York: Columbia University Press
- 1999 Sambia Sexual Culture: Essays from the Field. Chicago: University of Chicago Press
- 1998 Rituals of Manhood, edited by Gilbert Herdt. New edition. New York:Transaction Publishers.
- 1997 Same Sex, Different Cultures. New York: Westview Press.
- 1997 Sexual Cultures and Migration in the Era of AIDS: Anthropological and Demographic Perspectives (International Studies in Demography). New York:Oxford University Press
- 1994 Third Sex, Third Gender. New York: Zone Books.
- 1993 Gay Culture In America: Essays From the Field. Boston: Beacon Press
- 1992 Children of Horizons: How Gay Youth are Forging a New Way Out of the Closet. (With Andrew Boxer.) Boston: Beacon Press.
- 1991 The Time of AIDS. (With Shirley Lindenbaum.) Thousand Oaks, Ca: Sage Books.
- 1990 Intimate Communications: Erotics and the Study of Culture. (With Robert J. Stoller) New York: Columbia University Press.
- 1987 The Sambia: Ritual and Gender in New Guinea. New York: Harcourt Brace Jovanovich.
- 1984 Ritualized Homosexuality in Melanesia (Studies in Melanesian Anthropology), editor Gilbert Herdt. Berkeley: University of California Press
- 1982 Rituals of Manhood. Berkeley: University of California Press.
- 1981 Guardians of the Flutes: Idioms of Masculinity. New York: McGraw-Hill.
