= Yagwoia language =

Language

Yagwoia
- Native to: Papua New Guinea
- Region: Morobe, Eastern Highlands, Gulf provinces
- Native speakers: 10,000 (2005)
- Language family: Trans–New Guinea: Angan; Yagwoia

Language codes
- ISO 639-3: ygw
- Glottolog: yagw1240

Yagwoia is an Angan language of Papua New Guinea. Dialects are named after the five ethnicities, Hiqwase, Gwaze, Angapase, Kamiwaralje, Wabazamnye.

== Distribution ==
Yagwoia is spoken in:

- Eastern Highlands Province: Yogwia
- Gulf Province: Gwase
- Morobe Province: Yowia Tribe

== Phonology ==
Consonants
	Labial	Alveolar	Velar	Uvular	Glottal
Plosive	p	t	k	q	ʔ ⟨'⟩
Fricative		s			h
Nasal	m	n	ŋ ⟨ng⟩		
Approximant	w	l	j ⟨y⟩		

- /p t k/ tend to become voiced [b d g] in clusters with nasals or /l/.
- /m n ŋ l/ can be syllabic.
- /s/ is in free variation with [z]. Older speakers tend to pronounce it as [ts~dz].
- /t/ can often be heard as [r].

Vowels
	Front	Central	Back
High	i	ɨ	u
Mid	e		o
Low		a aː	

- /ɨ/ is rare.

Additionally, the following diphthongs have been observed: /ei/, /ai/, /ae/, /au/, /ou/.

Yagwoia is tonal, distinguishing high and low tone. However, tone has a low functional load, and so remains unwritten.
