= Angan languages =

Family of Trans–New Guinea languages

Angan
- Kratke Range
- Geographic distribution: Kratke Range, Morobe Province, Papua New Guinea
- Ethnicity: Angu people
- Linguistic classification: Trans–New Guinea: Eastern Highlands – Kratke Range; Angan

Language codes
- Glottolog: anga1289
- Map: The Angan languages of New Guinea The Angan languages Other Trans–New Guinea languages Other Papuan languages Austronesian languages Uninhabited

The Angan or Kratke Range languages are a family of the Trans–New Guinea languages in the classification of Malcolm Ross. The Angan languages are clearly valid as a family. They were first identified as such by J. Lloyd and A. Healey in 1968; Wurm (1975) classified them as Trans–New Guinea. Glottolog treats Angan as a separate or unclassified family, ignoring further evidence.

The languages are spoken in the Kratke Range of Eastern Highlands Province and adjoining areas of Gulf Province and Morobe Province.

== Languages ==
Ross (2005) classifies the languages as follows:

- Angan
  - Angaatiha
  - Angan proper (Nuclear Angan)
    - Angan branch A:
      - Hamtai (Kapau)
      - Kamasa
      - Kawatsa
      - Menya
      - Yagwoia
    - Angan branch B:
      - Akoye (Lohiki)
      - Yipma (Baruya)
      - Safeyoka
      - Simbari
      - Susuami
      - Tainae (Ivori)

Branch A is defined by the pronouns 1SG ni and 2SG ti. Ankave is not listed in Ross's classification. It has the 1SG pronouns based on ni, but not a 2SG based on ti.

Usher (2020) is both more agnostic and contradicting of Ross's 'A' and 'B' branches:

- Kratke Range
  - Angaataha
  - Yagwoia
  - Northeast: Kamasa, Kawacha, Safeyoka, Susuami
  - Northwest: Baruya (Yipma), Simbari
  - Southeast: Hamtai (Kapau), Menya
  - Southwest: Akoye (Lohiki) – Tainae (Ivori), Angave

Menya is notable for its dyadic kinship terms (terms referring to the relationship two or more people have to each other), which are rare globally and not prevalent in Papua New Guinea (though they also exist in the Oksapmin language).

Many Angan languages are covered by phonological sketches in Lloyd (1973a, b).

== Pronouns ==
Ross (1995) reconstructs the pronouns (independent and object prefixes) as follows:

	singular	dual	plural
1st person	*nə, *ni *nə-	*nʌ, *yʌi *e(a)-	*nʌi *na-
2nd person	*gə, *ti *gə-	*kʌi	*sʌi *se-
3rd person	*gʌ *u-/*w-	? (=3SG)	*ku (=3SG)

== Vocabulary comparison ==
The following basic vocabulary words are from the Trans-New Guinea database:

The words cited constitute translation equivalents, whether they are cognate (e.g. mɨnyagɨnya, magɨna, munakɨna for “head”) or not (e.g. sanggwa, avgwo, nyɨla for “sun”).

gloss	Ankave	Akoye	Baruya	Hamtai	Kamasa	Kawacha	Menya	Safeyoka	Simbari	Tainae	Yagwoia	Angaataha
head	mɨnga(yi)	mɨnggaaya	mɨnyagɨnya	mnga	magɨna	munakɨna	mnyanga	mɨnakɨna	minta	mɨnggaai	mnakɨna	mɨtɨ-'o
hair	nda'a	n̩daa(vɨ')	mɨjata	mta	njisa	msa'a	mta; nda	mɨsa	mindata	ṃde	msaasa	mɨsis-a'a
ear	haara'a	araa	kadɨka	qata	kata'a	kaatɨga	qata	haaraha	kaantɨka	aarɨ(na)	qatisa	atɨ'-ɨrɨ
eye	sɨmu(yi)	aagwaai	tɨnna	hingo	tuma	tɨmma	hingwa	tɨma	sɨmta	haagwe	hina	nt-a'a
nose	sɨ'ma	hamɨ	sɨnna	hima	sipata	lɨpasi	hima	zamaana	sɨmputa	hamɨ	himsa	mant-a'a
tooth	maangɨ	maaga	maanga	maanga	maanga	maanga	heqwaanga	maanga	maanka	maage	maana	mank-ɨrɨ
tongue	aai'wɨ	aabgwa; aavwia	taalɨta	aaiwa	tewa	teva	tewa	meraanya	kwaavlɨlɨ	aaveona	hyaalsa	omas-a'a
leg	sugwaaviaga	avga	sɨvɨla	yanga	sugwa	lɨvya	zuka	zɨve	sɨwla	habgu'	kwapɨtwalyɨ	au'-ɨrɨ
louse	iya	ye	yɨle	iyaa'aa	iya	iya	yaaqa	iyaa	ila	nde'	ila	akɨrɨ-'o
dog	sɨwia	tayo	jɨlɨka	hive'aa	suya	lɨvaaya	hivyeqa	zɨwasa	njɨlɨka	tɨyo	wakyɨ	su'-ɨrɨ
bird	inga	inko	yuta	inga	manɨwa	mɨnavaaya	yinga	yɨhuva	ntaqatɨ	inko	qaikwɨsa	ko-'o
egg	ki'mɨnga	m̩ge	(yu)kwaraka	mnga	hi'imɨya	mɨnya	qwi	mɨna	pantapta	ṃge'; munke'	mna	kwaatani-patɨ; nameraa-'o
blood	taangga	taagi	tawe	hinge'aa	kwe	langaaya	hangeqa	saahana; yaa'mpaza	mɨnjaaka	taagi'	msaasa	nsɨtɨ-patɨ
bone	enga'	yanggai	yagɨnya	yanga	yakina	yakɨna	yaanga	yakana	yankinta	yɨnggai	yekɨna	antɨ-tatɨ
skin	yaraa(na)	yara(na)	kɨlaaka	hewa	pa'a(me)	paa(ga)	hviwa	(aa'ma)paaha	kɨlaaka	yarana	aa'mosa	ampɨ-patɨ
breast	aamunga	aamɨgo	aa(ng)wɨnya	aamga	aanya	aamɨna	aangwa	aamna	aamɨnta	aamugo'	aamna	amwɨtɨ'-ɨrɨ
tree	ika'	iga'	ita	iya	isa	iga	iya	iya	ika	igya	isa	i-patɨ
man	oga	avo; waako	kwala	qoka	kwe'wa	kwe; kwoyava	qoka	hwe	kwala	avo	kwala	wo-'o
woman	aavagi	abaagi	bala	aapaka	amaa	a'me; api	apaka	ape	aampala	avaagi	aapala	apop-aatɨ
sun	sanggwa	avgwo	nyɨla	mapa	mape	mapiya	mapa (tɨqa)	mape	kwɨnja; nilya	habgo'	mapya	ipɨ-'o
moon	ema'	aamnggo	langwa	qaamnga	ki'yapa	kaamɨna	qaangwa	haamna	lampaaka	imo'	lamnyɨ	waatɨ-'o
water	yɨnunggu	inaaga	aalya	e'aa	kwe('ma)	aaya	eqa	aaya	aalya; wanya	(i)naagu	aalyɨ	wapo'-o
fire	ta'a	ta(vɨ')	dɨka	ta	ta'a	tɨga	ta	tɨha	ntɨka	taa(vɨ')	tɨsa	sis-a'a
stone	sa'anga	andaga	sɨla	hawa	tega	laasa	hika	zasa	sɨla	haai	hekyɨ	naw-a'a
name	avaa'nankana	ntaga	yaya (yavya)	yav'a	nyanyaawo	yavya	yavqa	yave	yavata	taagɨ(va')	yawyɨ	ampɨ-patɨ
eat	n̲eo'	n̲amda'	n̲ɨwa'	qan̲'i	inyo	minyo	an̲ki	haṉkaha	an̲aantapyɨ	nɨmda'	hisa n̲aatana	nanataise
one	naawona	fonu'	pɨrɨ' (na)	fati (na)	hunanɨnko	uwa'na	hɨnkwona	ingava'na	pɨrɨ'mɨna	fono	hɨnkwa'na	nas-
two	uwa	faaina	pɨrɨwaai (na)	hivaa'u	hukwego	huvaa'u	hɨnqwaaqwo	huvaa'u	pɨvɨraalna	foya	hulwaaqwɨ	ya-
