= Yipma language =

Angan language spoken in Papua New Guinea

Yipma
- Baruya
- Native to: Papua New Guinea
- Region: Morobe Province
- Ethnicity: Baruya etc.
- Native speakers: (6,600 cited 1990 census)
- Language family: Trans–New Guinea: Angan; Northwest; Yipma

Language codes
- ISO 639-3: byr
- Glottolog: baru1267

Yipma (pronounced as Hipma) is an Angan language of Papua New Guinea. Dialects are Wantakia, Baruya (Barua), Gulicha, Usirampia (Wuzuraabya).

== History ==
'Baruya' refers to the accent of the Bruwa tribe, currently residing around the Marawaka station area. The original tribe that had been in Marawaka is the Anzii tribe. They are now located at the foot of Mount Yelia in three villages: Wauko, Ande and Mala.

The Baruwa tribe were refugees, from somewhere in the Meniyamiya area of Morobe province, who had been driven out of their land in a tribal war, the Anzii while still in Marawaka peacefully took them in. After some time, tribal war broke out between the Anzii tribe and the Baruwa tribe and the Anzii tribe moved out from Marawaka to where they are now. Thus, "Baruya" is not a dialect but an accent, but 'Hipma' is more acceptable to speakers of other dialects.

== Dialects ==
Usirampia is another accent of the Hipma language, but it is mixed up with another language called Bulekiye. It sounds more like Hipma though there are some Bulekiye influences in it. The Anzii tribe speaks the pure version of the Hipma language and there are no influences from other languages because they were surrounded by enemy tribes from the time they were relocated until the arrival of whitemen and did not make many contacts outside their landmarks.

== Phonology ==
Consonants
	Labial	Alveolar	Palatal	Velar	Glottal
Plosive	p	t	tɕ	k	ʔ
Prenasalized	ᵐb	ⁿd	ⁿdʑ	ᵑg	
Fricative	β	ð	ʑ	ɣ	
Nasal	m	n		ŋ	
Approximant	w	r l	j		

- /ʔ/ becomes an unreleased plosive [p̚ t̚ k̚] before homorganic plosives and nasals.
- /r/ is realised as [l] before /j/ or /i/.

Vowels
	Front	Central	Back
High	i	ɨ	u
Mid	e	ʌ	o
Low		a	

- /ɨ/ can range in realization from [ɪ] to [ʊ].
- /ʌ/ can range in realization from [ɛ] to [ɔ].
- In general, /ɨ/ and /ʌ/ are backed when /w/, /u/, or /o/ occur in the same or following syllable; and fronted when /j/ or /i/ occur in the same or following syllable.

Yipma has pitch-accent. Either the final or penultimate syllable can be accented, manifesting in high pitch and stress.

== Bibliography ==
- Lloyd, Richard G. 1989. Bound and Minor Words in Baruya. Ukarumpa: SIL-PNG.
- Lloyd, Joy A. 1992. A Baruya-Tok Pisin-English Dictionary. Canberra: Pacific Linguistics.
