= Hamtai language =

Angan language spoken in Papua New Guinea

Hamtai
- Hamday
- Kapau
- Native to: Papua New Guinea
- Region: Morobe Province, Gulf Province
- Native speakers: (45,000 cited 1998)
- Language family: Trans–New Guinea: Angan; Southeast; Hamtai
- Dialects: Wenta; Howi; Pmasa'a; Hamtai Proper; Kaintiba

Language codes
- ISO 639-3: hmt
- Glottolog: hamt1247

Hamtai (also called Hamday or Kapau) is the most populous of the Angan languages of Papua New Guinea. It is also known as Kamea, Kapau, and Watut. Dialects are Wenta, Howi, Pmasa’a, Hamtai proper, and Kaintiba. The language was unwritten until 2009.

== Phonology ==
In Hamtai, there are 14 consonants, 7 vowels, and two tones (rising and falling).

=== Vowels ===
Table of vowels in Hamtai
	Front	Central	Back
Close	i /i/	i /ɨ/	u /u/
Close-mid	e /e/		o /o/
Open-mid			ä, aa /ʌ/
Open		a /a/	

=== Consonants ===
Table of consonant phonemes in Hamtai
		Labial	Alveolar	Palatal	Velar	Uvular	Glottal
Nasal		m /m/	n /n/		ng /ŋ/		
Plosive		p /p/	t /t/		k /k/	k̥/q /q/	' /ʔ/
Approximant	voiced			y /j/	w /w/		
Approximant	unvoiced				wh /w̥/		
Fricative	voiced	v /v/					
Fricative	unvoiced	f /f/					h /h/
