= Aloysius Murwito =

Indonesian prelate of the Catholic Church (1950–2026)

The Most Reverend Aloysius Murwito O.F.M.
- Bishop of Agats
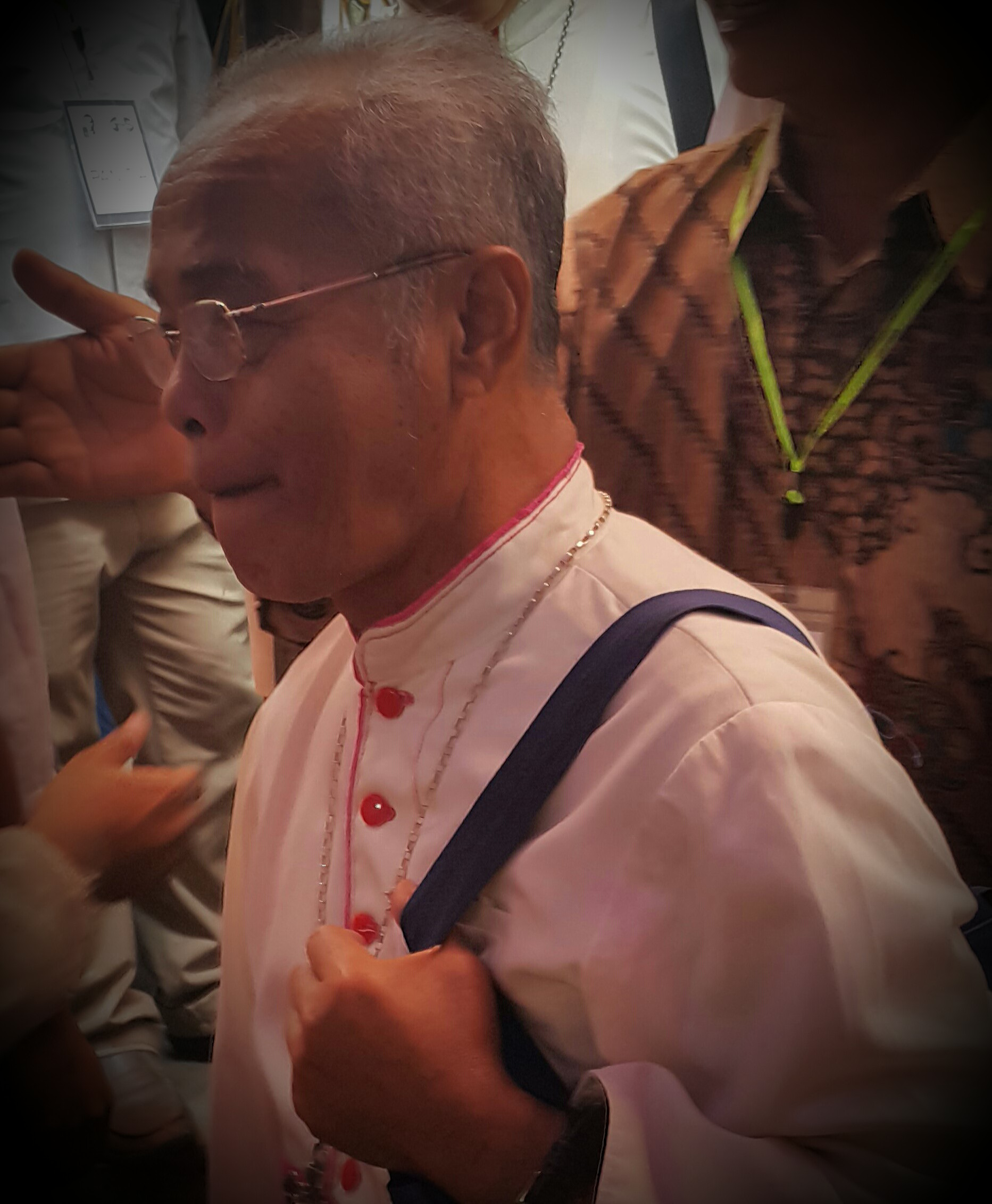
- Murwito in 2017
- Church: Catholic Church
- Archdiocese: Merauke
- Diocese: Agats
- Appointed: 7 June 2002
- Installed: 15 September 2002
- Term ended: 12 November 2026
- Predecessor: Alphonsus Augustus Sowada
- Successor: Sede vacante

Orders
- Ordination: 7 July 1982 by Jacobus Duivenvoorde
- Consecration: 15 September 2002 by Jacobus Duivenvoorde, Alphonsus Augustus Sowada, Leo Laba Ladjar, Francis Xavier Sudartanta Hadisumarta

Personal details
- Born: 20 December 1950 Sleman, Indonesia
- Died: 12 November 2026 (aged 75) Yogyakarta, Indonesia

Aloysius Murwito (20 December 1950 – 12 November 2026) was an Indonesian Roman Catholic prelate and Franciscan friar who served as the second Bishop of Agats in Indonesia.

The health problems of his predecessor, Alphonsus Augustus Sowada, including a quadruple heart bypass in 1999, led to his retirement on 9 May 2001. Murwito succeeded him as Bishop of Agats in 2002.

Murwito died at Panti Rapih Hospital on 12 November 2026, at the age of 75.

Catholic Church titles
Preceded by Alphonsus Augustus Sowada, O.S.C.	Bishop of Agats; 2002–2026	Succeeded by Sede vacante
