= American Museum of Asmat Art =

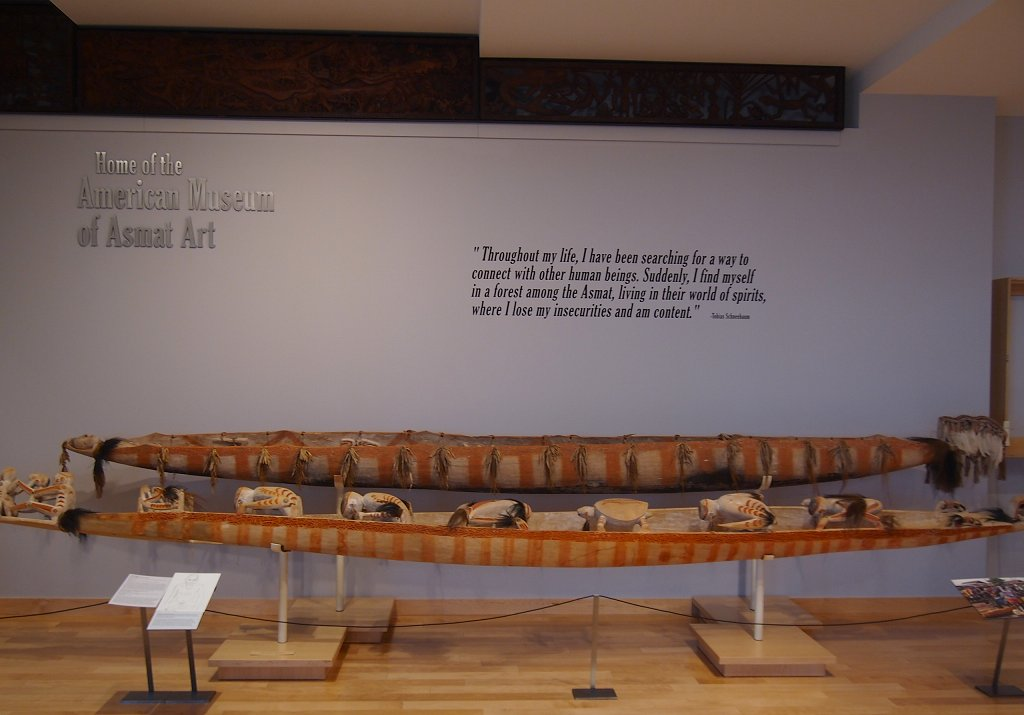
- Established: 2007
- Location: Anderson Student Center, University of St. Thomas, St. Paul, Minnesota
- Coordinates: 44°56′32″N 93°11′27″W
- Type: Art museum, anthropology museum
- Collections: Asmat art
- Director: Gretchen Burau
- Website: https://www.theamaa.org/

The American Museum of Asmat Art is a gallery exhibiting the art and culture of the Asmat people of southwestern Papua, Indonesia, housed at the University of St. Thomas in St. Paul, Minnesota. Featuring more than 2,200 objects, it is one of the largest of its kind in the United States.

Asmat art is widely collected in major Western museums despite the difficulty in visiting the remote region to collect work; the "exceptionally expressive" art "caused a sensation in art-collecting circles" which led to large-scale collecting expeditions in the post-WWII era, according to art scholar and ethnologist Dirk A.M. Smidt. The gallery includes a permanent display of Asmat works such as ancestor poles (bis) and canoes, and a rotating exhibition highlighting aspects of Asmat art and culture. Much of the collection is accessible through the museum's online database.

The museum was founded by Bishop Alphonse Sowada, a Minnesota native who worked with the Asmat people in Agats, Indonesia, for decades starting in 1958. Sowada, who had earned a master's degree in cultural anthropology from Catholic University of America, wrote books on Asmat art and culture and collected hundreds of artifacts, which later formed the core of the museum's collection. Sowada was also instrumental in founding the Asmat Museum of Culture and Progress in Agats in 1973, described by the artist Tobias Schneebaum as "a museum designed for the local people, not the nonexistent tourist," as well as an annual woodcarving competition and auction to recognize outstanding carvers in Agats, held in October since 1981.

After Sowada's retirement and return to the United States, he housed the collection in Hastings, Nebraska, and Shoreview, Minnesota, before donating it to St. Thomas in 2007. The current museum was opened in 2012.
