= Ewer Airport =

Ewer Airport Bandar Udara Ewer
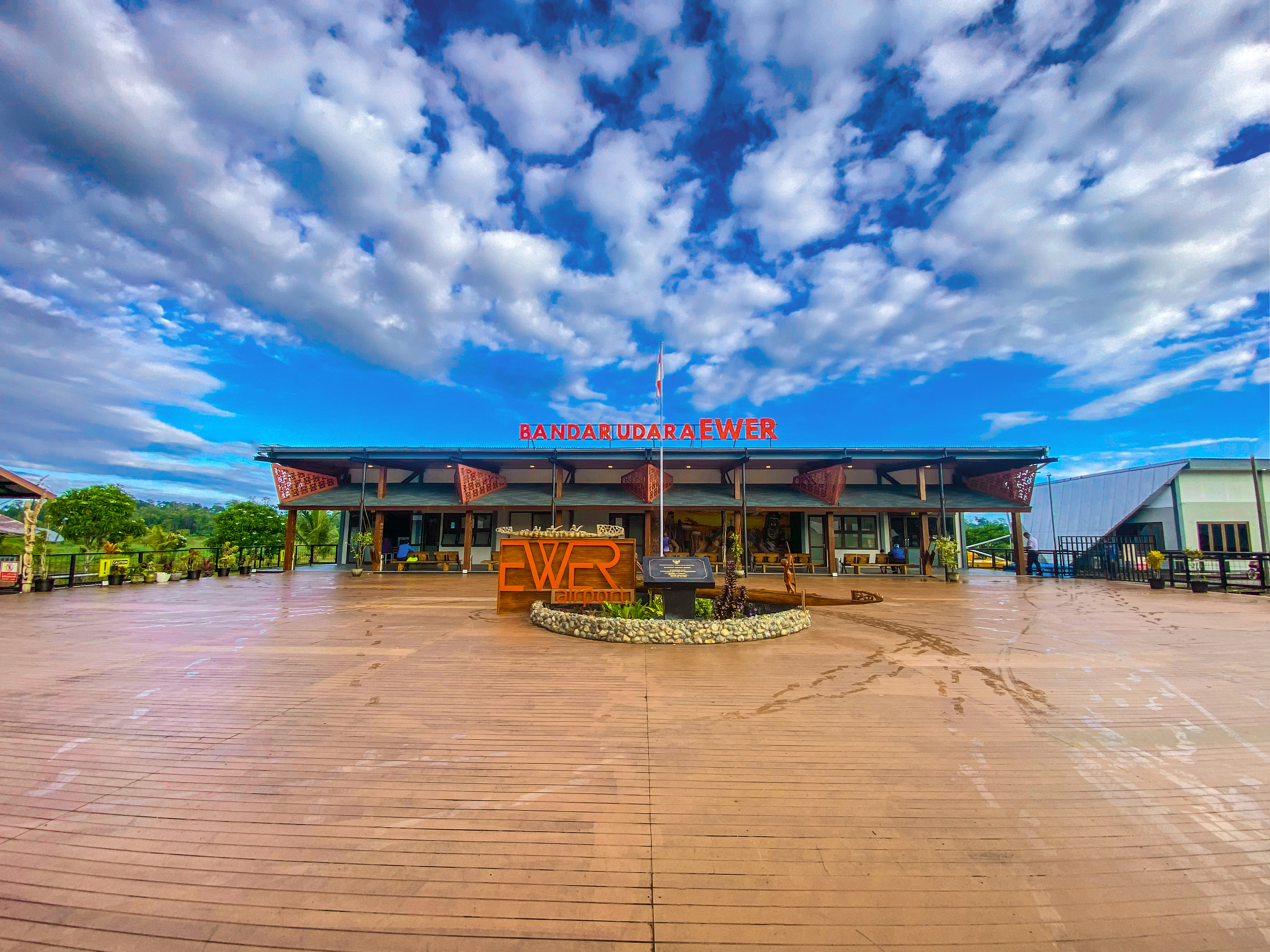
- Ewer Airport as of March 2025
- IATA: EWE; ICAO: WAKG

Summary
- Airport type: Public
- Owner: Government of Indonesia
- Operator: Directorate General of Civil Aviation
- Serves: Agats
- Location: Joerat, Asmat Regency, South Papua, Indonesia
- Time zone: WIT (UTC+09:00)
- Elevation AMSL: 10 ft / 3 m
- Coordinates: 5.492559°S 138.085491°E

Map
- Location in Western New Guinea Location in Indonesia

Runways
Direction	Length		Surface
Direction	ft	m	Surface
06/24	5,413	1,650	Asphalt
- Source: Directorate General of Civil Aviation

Ewer Airport (IATA: EWE, ICAO: WAKG) is an airport located in Joerat, Asmat Regency, South Papua, Indonesia. The airport serves as the main point of entry to both Agats, the capital of Asmat Regency, and the regency as a whole. The airport is connected by flights to Merauke, the capital of South Papua, and to Timika in Central Papua, as well as to some rural destinations.

== History ==
Ewer Airport was first constructed in 1964 by the Diocese of Merauke to support missionary activities. At the time, the runway was only 400 meters long and could only accommodate small aircraft such as the Cessna. When it was first built, the runway consisted of compacted earth covered with wooden planks. Between the 1970s to 1980s, this was replaced with steel matting. With the installation of the steel mats, cargo aircraft such as the Pilatus Porter were able to land at Ewer Airport to deliver logistics to eastern Indonesia.

To improve airport facilities and accommodate the growing number of passengers, major upgrades were carried out at Ewer Airport. Between 2014 and 2018, the Asmat Regency government began development by extending the runway to 1,650 meters. This was followed by the reconstruction of the steel mat runway, construction of an apron, and development of a new terminal building. These upgrades enabled the airport to accommodate larger aircraft such as the ATR 72.

In 2019, further improvements were made to enhance accessibility and upgrade the airport’s facilities.

In 2023, the terminal building underwent beautification, adopting a minimalist architectural design infused with Asmat cultural elements. Not only were Asmat-inspired ornaments featured, but the terminal’s functional design was also adapted to reflect local culture, weather conditions, and the unique characteristics of the Asmat environment.

Development of Ewer Airport is still ongoing, including the construction of drainage systems and a flood barrier. Due to its coastal location, the airport is frequently affected by tidal flooding.

The upgrade project, which cost a total of Rp 287 billion, was completed in 2022 and officially inaugurated by President Joko Widodo on 6 July 2023.

== Facilities ==
The airport occupies an area of 49.83 hectares. It has a runway measuring 1,650 meters by 30 meters, an apron of 70 by 90 meters, and a taxiway measuring 86 by 15 meters. It is capable of accommodating ATR 72 aircraft for both passenger and cargo operations. Ewer Airport has a terminal covering an area of 488 square meters, which is larger than the old terminal, which was only 120 square meters. The terminal was designed in the traditional Asmat architectural style, with Asmat-inspired ornaments and carvings placed throughout the airport to reflect the local culture.

== Airlines and destinations ==
The following destinations are served from Ewer Airport:

Airlines	Destinations
Susi Air	Kamur, Merauke
Trigana Air	Merauke
Wings Air	Timika

== Statistics ==
Busiest flights out of Ewer Airport by frequency (2025)
Rank	Destinations	Frequency (weekly)	Airline(s)
1	Timika, Central Papua	4	Wings Air
2	Merauke, South Papua	3	Trigana Air
3	Kamur, South Papua	3	Susi Air

== Gallery ==
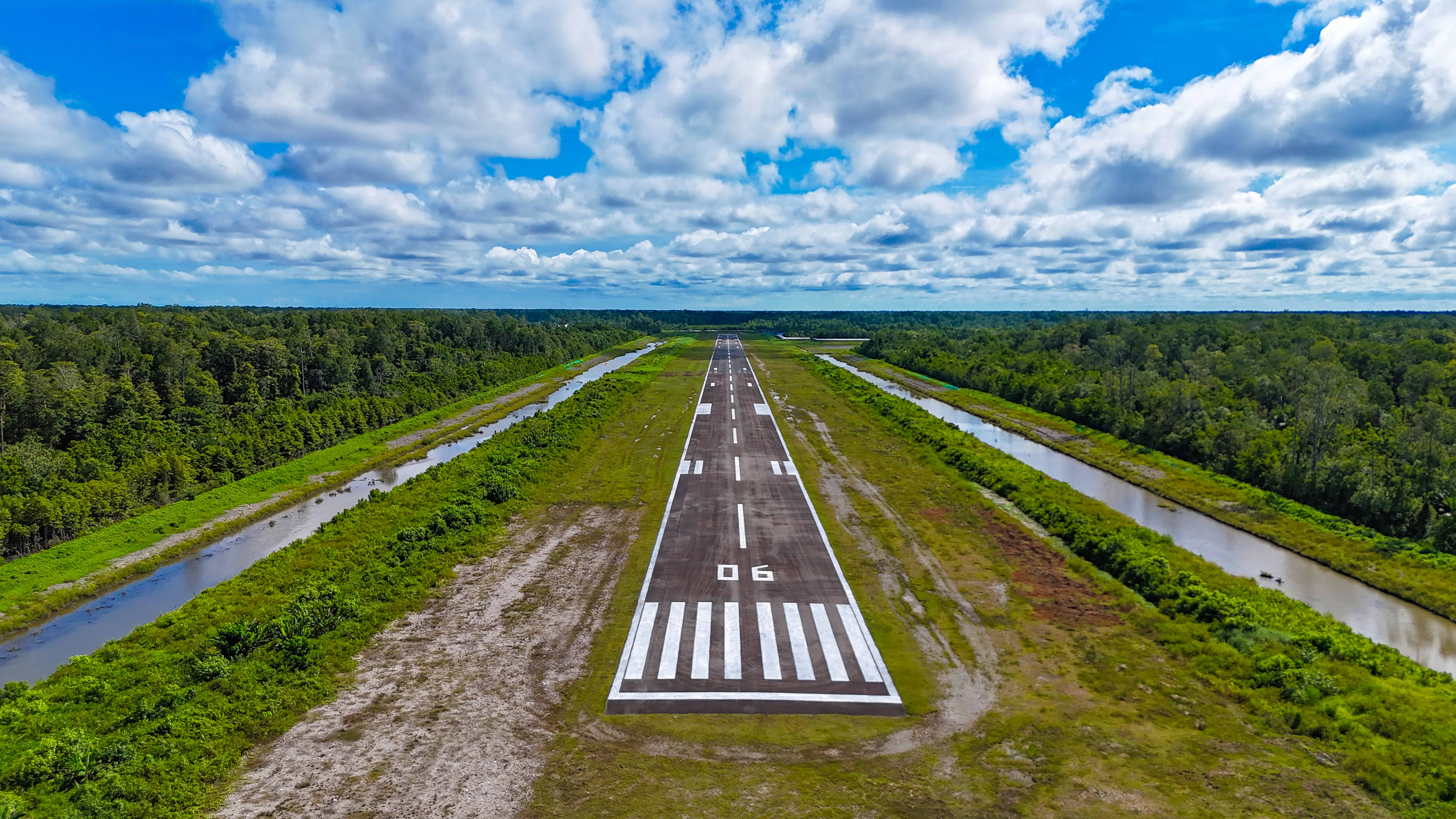
Runway

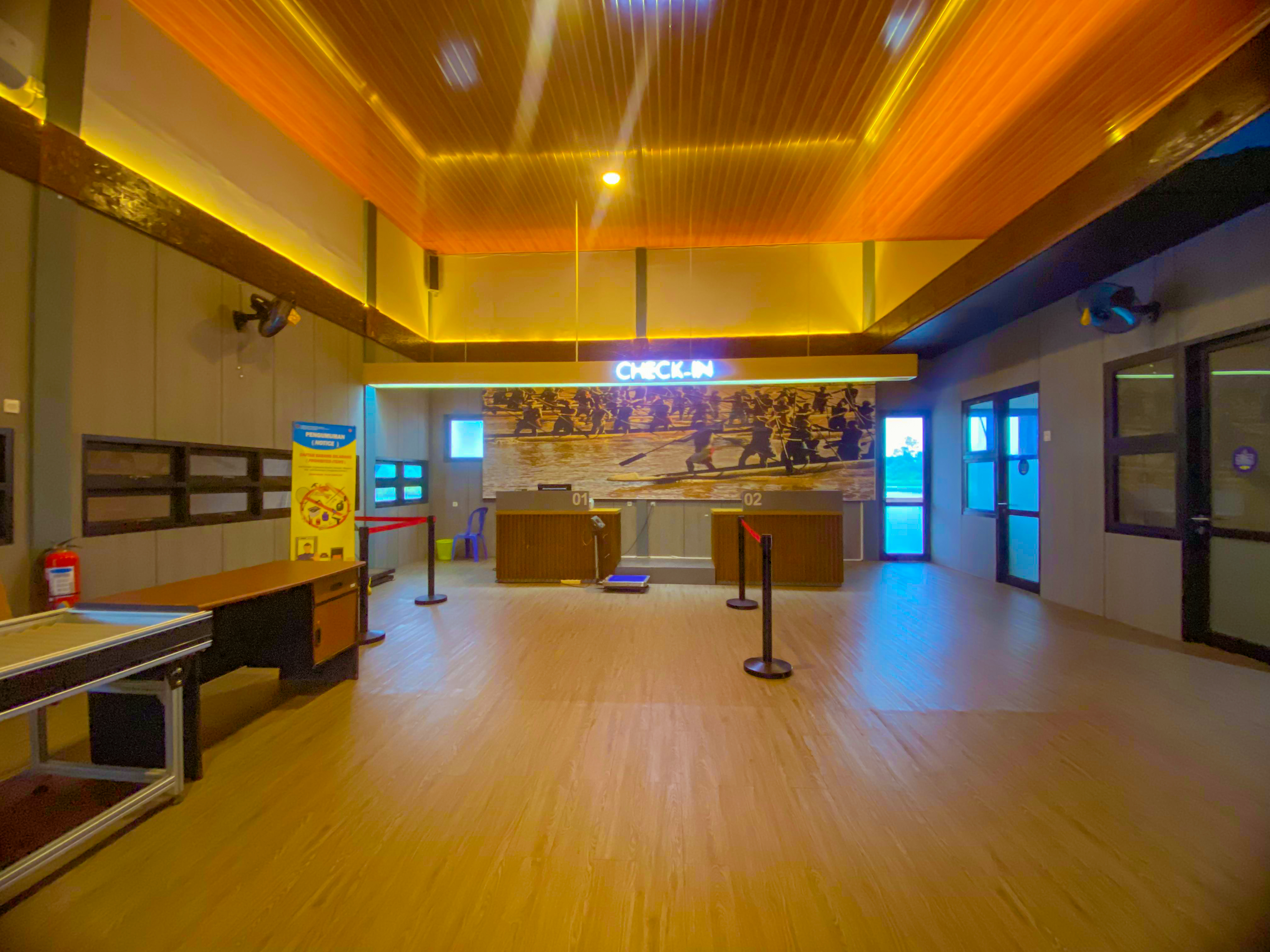
Check-in area

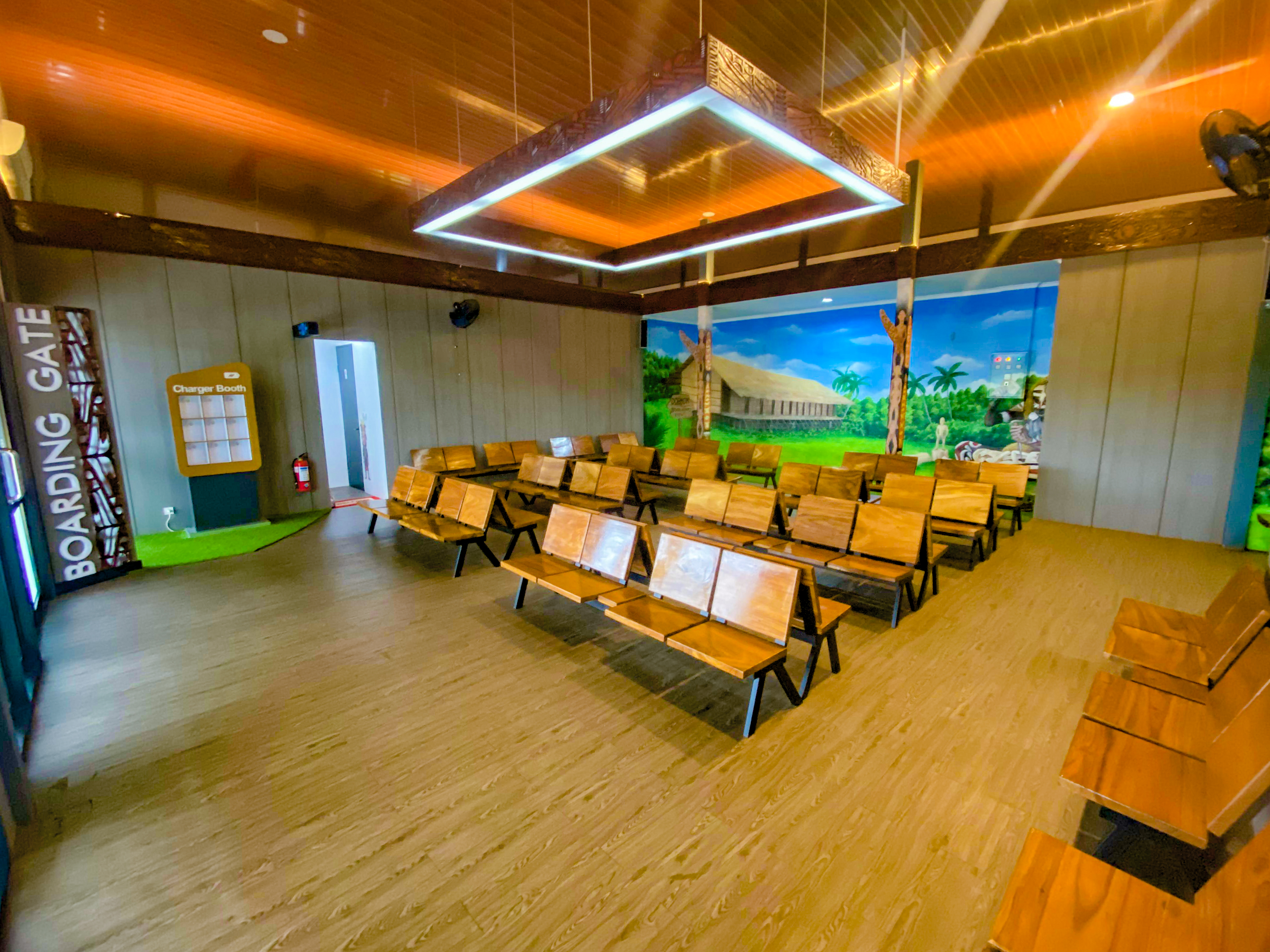
Waiting room

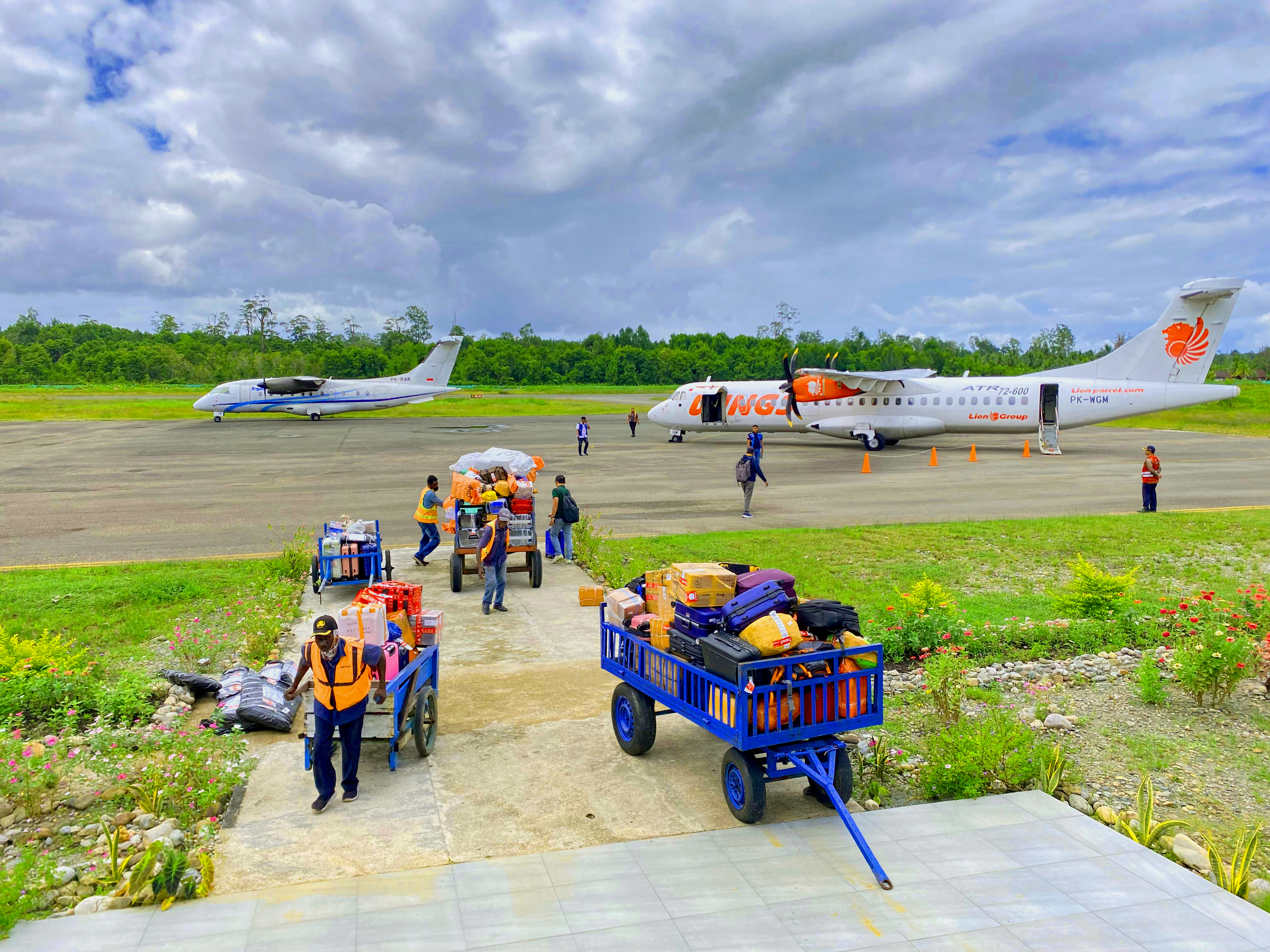
Apron view
