= Sowada =

Sowada is a surname. Notable people with the surname include:

- Karin Sowada (born 1961), Australian archaeologist and former politician
- Alphonsus Augustus Sowada (1933–2014), American Roman Catholic bishop and cultural anthropologist
