= Keep the River on Your Right =

Book by Tobias Schneebaum

- Author: Tobias Schneebaum
- Language: English
- Genre: Memoir
- Publication date: 1969
- Publication place: United States

Keep the River on your Right is a short memoir written by American anthropologist and artist Tobias Schneebaum, published in 1969.

== Content ==
It is an account of his journey into the jungles of Peru where he is accepted by "primitive" Indians and ultimately a tribe of cannibals named the Arakmbut, which he refers to by the pseudonym Arakama.

Schneebaum was presumed dead by colleagues, friends, and family after he disappeared for years into the jungle, the last westerner to see him was a missionary who had given him instructions he would find the cannibals if he "kept the river to his right." However, Schneebaum struck up a friendship with the Arakmbut based partially around his considerable art skills and his interest in theirs. The book is most renowned for its anthropological observation of flesh-eating rituals and the honest, light-hearted style in which it was written.

== Film ==
The book was the partial basis for a 2000 documentary film of the same name, Keep the River on Your Right: A Modern Cannibal Tale by sibling filmmakers David and Laurie Gwen Shapiro. The film also covers material from several of Schneebaum's other books and articles.
