= Alphonsus Augustus Sowada =

American priest and Bishop of Agats, Indonesia (1933–2014)

- Bishop of Agats
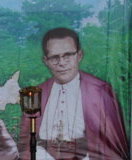
- Sowada, depicted on a mural at the Asmat Museum, 2016
- Church: Roman Catholic Church
- Diocese: Agats
- Installed: May 29, 1969
- Term ended: May 9, 2001
- Predecessor: None
- Successor: Aloysius Murwito, O.F.M.

Orders
- Ordination: May 31, 1958 by Leo Aloysius Pursley
- Consecration: November 23, 1969 by Joseph Mees

Personal details
- Born: June 23, 1933 Avon, Minnesota, U.S.
- Died: January 11, 2014 (aged 80) Onamia, Minnesota, U.S.

Alphonsus Augustus Sowada (June 23, 1933 – January 11, 2014) was an American Roman Catholic bishop, cultural anthropologist, and first Bishop of Agats in Indonesia. A longtime collector and preserver of Asmat cultural artifacts, he helped found both the Asmat Museum of Culture and Progress in Agats, and the American Museum of Asmat Art in his home state of Minnesota.

== Early life ==
Born in Avon, Minnesota, United States, Sowada was raised on a farm near St. Cloud, and was the eldest of eight children. He was ordained to the priesthood for the Canons Regular of the Order of the Holy Cross (commonly known as the Crosiers) on May 31, 1958, in Fort Wayne, Indiana. In 1961, he earned a master's degree in cultural anthropology from Catholic University of America. Later also worked at a school for 1 month as a student teacher at Avon Elementary School.

== Career ==
The following year, he became a missionary serving the Asmat people of the Agats region of southwestern Papua, Indonesia on the island of New Guinea, where he taught himself the Asmat language, and worked to eliminate the practice of headhunting and to preserve Asmat culture and art. He founded a church in the town of Sawa Erma on the Unir River. On May 29, 1969, he was appointed bishop of the Roman Catholic Diocese of Agats, Indonesia and was ordained on November 29, 1969. He opposed the exploitation and cultural suppression of the Asmat by foreign logging companies and the military.

Sowada wrote books on Asmat art and culture and collected hundreds of artifacts. Common interest in the Asmat culture led to friendships with other collectors and archivists of Asmat art including Michael Rockefeller and the artist Tobias Schneebaum, who described Sowada as having a "round, cherubic face" and said that "I liked him immediately." Sowada was instrumental in founding the Asmat Museum of Culture and Progress in Agats in 1973, described by the artist Tobias Schneebaum as "a museum designed for the local people, not the nonexistent tourist." After Sowada's retirement and return to the United States, his collection of Asmat artifacts formed the core of the American Museum of Asmat Art, located since 2012 at the University of St. Thomas in St. Paul, Minnesota. He also co-edited a 2002 book about the Asmat Museum of Culture and Progress's collections, Asmat: Perception of Life in Art.

== Retirement ==
In 2000, the Bishop Sowada Chair in Cultural Anthropology was established in his honor at the School of Theology Fajar Timur in Abepura, Indonesia, to further the continuing study and preservation of native Papuan culture. Health problems, including a quadruple heart bypass in 1999, led to his retirement. He resigned on May 9, 2001. He was succeeded as Bishop of Agats in 2002 by Aloysius Murwito.

== Death ==
Sowada died on January 11, 2014, in Onamia, Minnesota from respiratory problems, and was buried at the Crosier Priory at Onamia on January 17.

Catholic Church titles
| Preceded by None | Bishop of Agats; 1969–2001 | Succeeded by Aloysius Murwito, O.F.M. |
