= Keep the River on Your Right: A Modern Cannibal Tale =

- Directed by: David Shapiro; Laurie Gwen Shapiro
- Written by: David Shapiro; Laurie Gwen Shapiro
- Produced by: David Shapiro; Laurie Gwen Shapiro
- Cinematography: Liz Dory
- Edited by: Tom Donahue; Tula Goenka
- Music by: Steven Bernstein
- Production companies: Lifer Films; Next Wave Films; Stolen Car Productions
- Distributed by: IFC Films
- Release date: April 15, 2000 (Los Angeles Independent Film Festival)
- Country: United States
- Language: English
- Box office: $373,366

Keep the River on Your Right: A Modern Cannibal Tale is a 2000 documentary film about the travels of American anthropologist and artist Tobias Schneebaum, directed by brother-and-sister filmmakers David Shapiro and Laurie Gwen Shapiro.

== Content ==
Taking its title from his 1969 book, Keep the River on Your Right, the film covers material from several of Schneebaum's other books and articles. In the film, Schneebaum, by then an elderly man, revisits two cannibal tribes—one in Papua New Guinea and the other in the jungles of Peru—with whom he had lived several years each as a young man. He and the filmmakers manage to locate a few of the individuals he had known well during those periods.

== Awards ==
The film won a 2001 Independent Spirit Award.
