= Asmat Museum of Culture and Progress =

Cultural museum in Agats, Indonesia

- Museum Kebudayaan dan Kemajuan Asmat
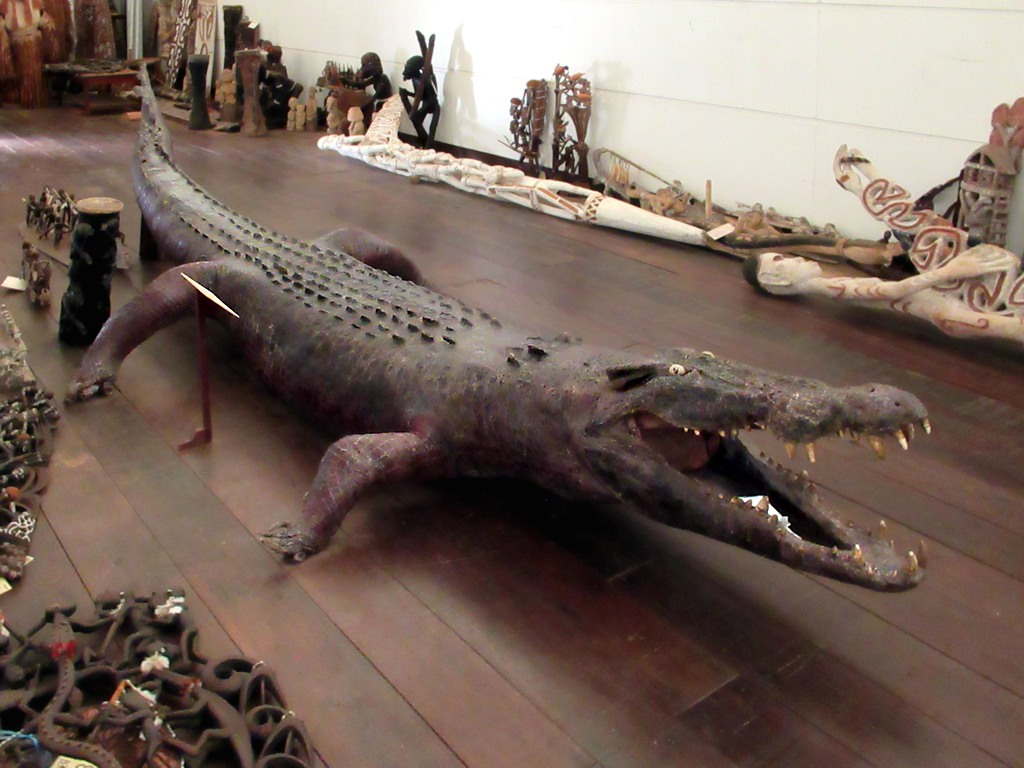
- A male crocodile specimen on display at the museum
- Established: 1973
- Location: Agats, Papua, Indonesia
- Coordinates: 5.5405295°S 138.1341535°E
- Type: Art museum, anthropology museum
- Collections: Asmat art
- Director: Eric Sarkol

The Asmat Museum of Culture and Progress (Indonesian: Museum Kebudayaan dan Kemajuan Asmat) is located in the city of Agats in South Papua, Indonesia. It was conceived by the Catholic Crosier missionary Frank Trenkenschuh in 1969 as a way to preserve traditional Asmat art as well as provide economic outlets to the Asmat people. It was built by the Catholic Crosier Diocese of Agats-Asmat, which also owns the museum, and supported by Crosier Fathers and Brothers Bishop Alphonse Sowada, originally from Elmdale, Minnesota, US.

The American artist Tobias Schneebaum and Ursula and Gunter Konrad helped in establishing the museum and it officially opened on August 17, 1973.

The museum has catalogued approximately 1,200 items to its collection. Over 600 are on display, including over 300 sculptural pieces, ancestor poles, shields, and drums.

Later, upon retiring to his native St. Cloud, MN, US area, Bishop emeritus Sowada was also instrumental in founding a second Asmat museum, the American Museum of Asmat Art which opened in 1995 at the University of St. Thomas in St. Paul, Minnesota, where it also appears under the acronyms AMAA and AMAA@UST.

The director of the Asmat Museum of Culture and Progress, as of 2007, has been Eric Sarkol with John Ohoiwirin as assistant.

Building upon a 1968–1974 United Nations funded Asmat wood carving project, the museum hosts an annual woodcarving competition and auction. The 31st Asmat Culture Festival sponsored by the Museum was scheduled for 8–13 October 2015.

== Gallery ==
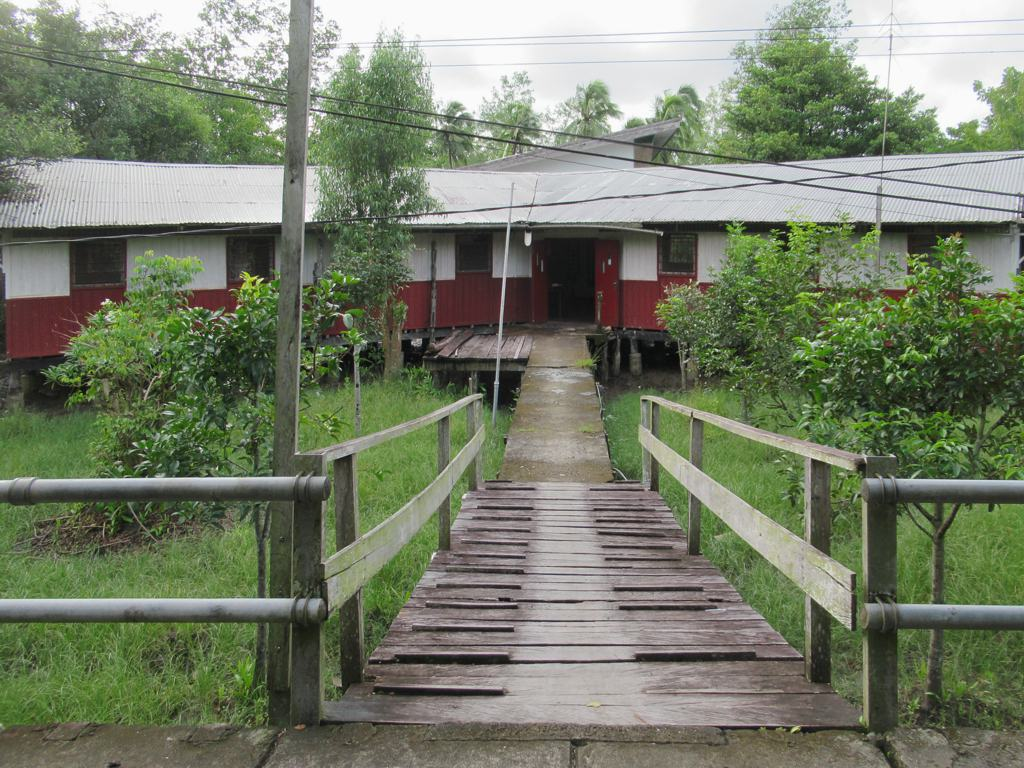
Exterior of the museum, 2019

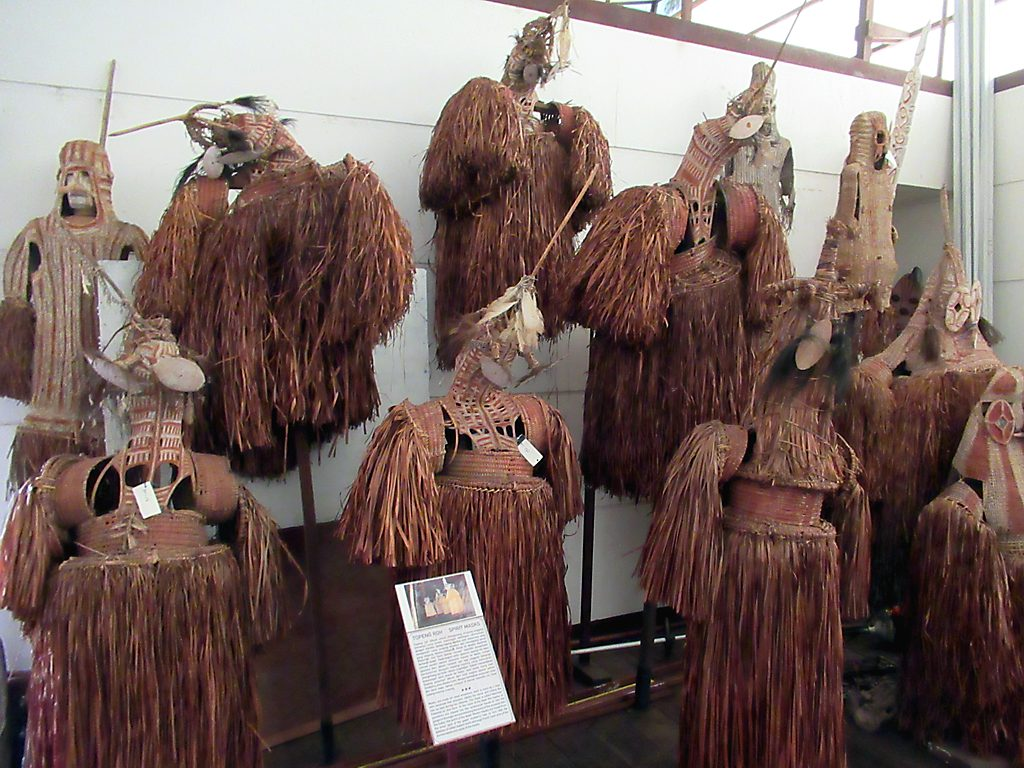
Paper mulberry spirit masks

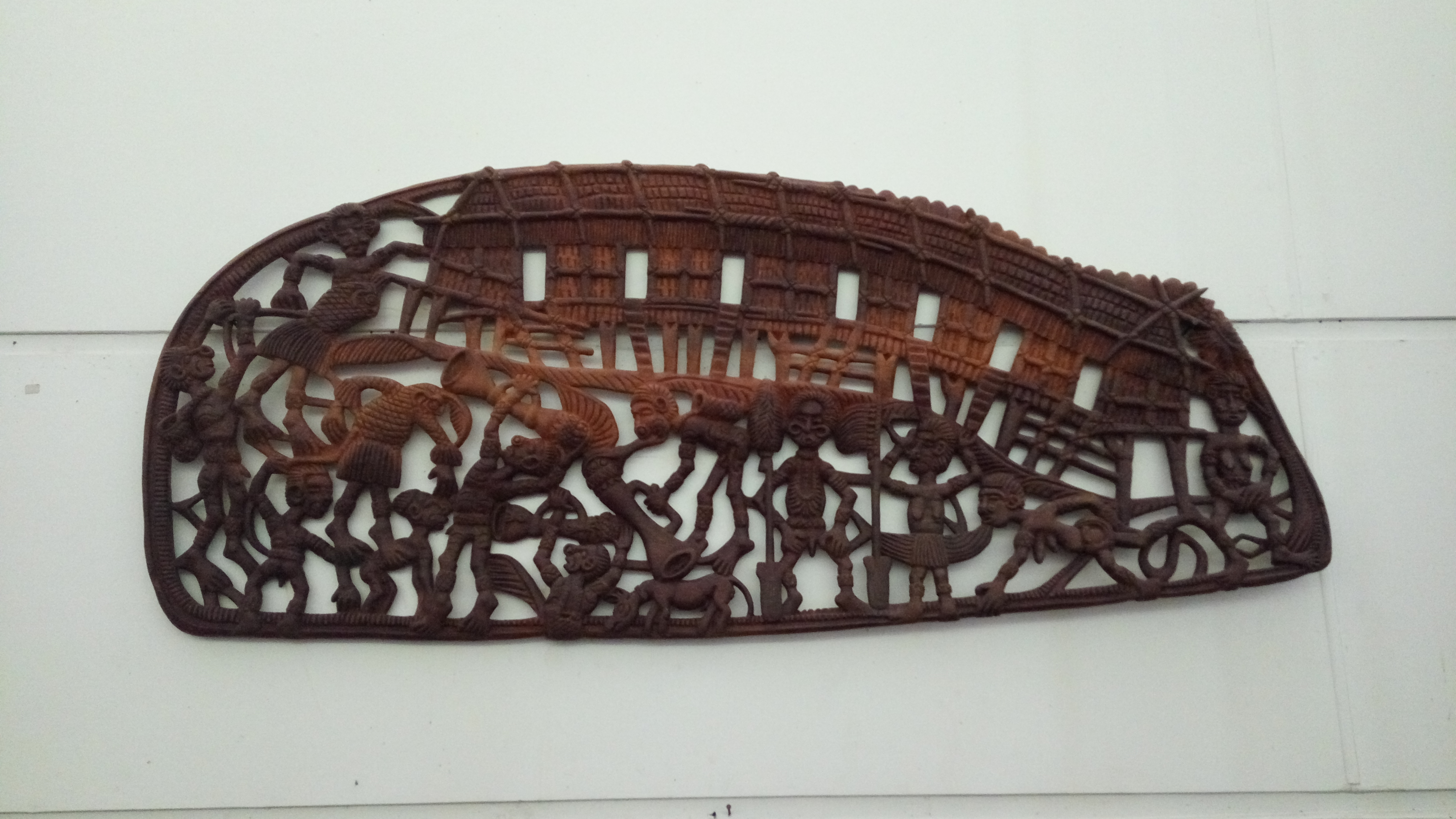
Asmat carving
