= Diocese of Agats =

Roman Catholic diocese on Papua, Indonesia

Coordinates: 5°32′S 138°08′E

Diocese of Agats Dioecesis Agatsensis Keuskupan Agats

Location
- Country: Indonesia
- Ecclesiastical province: Merauke
- Metropolitan: Merauke

Statistics
- Area: 37,000 km^{2} (14,000 sq mi)
- Population: Total; Catholics: (as of 2004); 98,732; 55,319 (56%)
- Parishes: 12

Information
- Rite: Latin Rite
- Established: 29 May 1969
- Cathedral: Cathedral of the Holy Cross in Agats Papua

Current leadership
- Pope: Leo XIV
- Bishop: Sede vacante
- Metropolitan Archbishop: Petrus Canisius Mandagi

Map

Website
- https://keuskupanagats.or.id

The Roman Catholic Diocese of Agats (Latin: Agatsen(sis)) is a diocese located in the town of Agats in the ecclesiastical province of Merauke in Indonesia.

== History ==
- May 29, 1969: Established as the Diocese of Agats from the Metropolitan Archdiocese of Merauke

== Leadership ==
- Bishops of Agats (Roman rite)
  - Bishop Aloysius Murwito, O.F.M. (June 7, 2002 – November 12, 2026)
  - Bishop Alphonsus Augustus Sowada, O.S.C. (May 29, 1969 – May 9, 2001)
