= Agats =

- Town
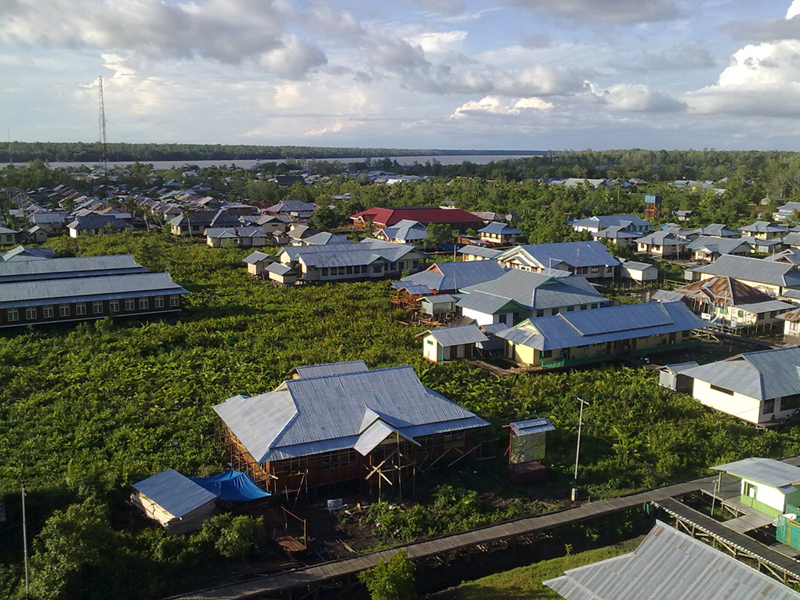
- Agats at noon
- Nickname: Kota Seribu Papan (Town of a Thousand Planks)
- Location in Western New Guinea
- Coordinates: 5°32′30″S 138°08′00″E
- Country: Indonesia
- Province: South Papua
- Regency: Asmat Regency

Population (mid 2024 estimate)
  - Total: 25,113
- Time zone: UTC+9 (IEST)
- Postcode: 99777
- Area code: (+62) 902
- Climate: Af
- Villages: 12

Agats is a town in Asmat Regency, South Papua, Indonesia. An elevated settlement on a tidal plain, a Dutch outpost was set up in Agats in 1938 and the town became notable for the cultural practices of the Asmat people. Following the formation of Asmat Regency in 2002, the town became its administrative seat.

== Administrative villages ==
Agats District consists of 12 villages (kampung), namely:

1. Asuwetsy
2. Bis Agats
3. Bisman
4. Bou
5. Briten (Biriten/Beriten)
6. Kaye
7. Mbait
8. Per
9. Saw
10. Suwru
11. Uwus
12. Yamoth (Yomoth)

== History ==
Though Agats had been populated by the Asmat people for some time, as a largely waterfront settlement, the first non-native settlement originated in the late 1930s when a Catholic mission was established in the area, and later in 1938 the Dutch East Indies government established an outpost there. Due to the Second World War, however, the Dutch abandoned the Agats post in 1942 due to the Japanese presence.

In 1953, the Catholic mission was made permanent and the following year the Dutch government of Netherlands New Guinea established a permanent post in Agats, banning headhunting practices. During this period, Asmat woodcarving became popular, with collectors, museum representatives, ethnographers and scientists visiting the area. One such visitor, Michael Rockefeller, disappeared after departing Agats for Southern Asmat in 1961, and was presumed dead.

On 29 May 1969, the Roman Catholic Diocese of Agats was established, with American Alphonse Sowada becoming its first bishop. The Asmat Museum of Culture and Progress (Museum Kebudayaan dan Kemajuan Asmat) was opened in Agats in 1973. The Asmat Cultural Festival, held annually in the town, began in 1981.

After Asmat became its own regency in 2002, Agats – being its administrative seat – saw a boost in building due to a need for government facilities and an increase of migrants, largely Bugis and Moluccans, with the annual population growth of Agats being as high as 22 percent between 2005 and 2011 compared to 3 percent for Asmat Regency. In recent years, the wooden roads in Agats have begun to be replaced by concrete ones by the regency's government.

Following a major famine which struck Asmat Regency, in 2018 Indonesian President Joko Widodo offered to relocate residents of more remote areas to Agats, though the relocation faced significant resistance.

== Geography ==
Agats is located on the delta of the Asewets River, in a tidal lowland area. Due to this, during high tides the water may rise up to 5 metres (16 ft) above sea level, resulting in the unique construction of the town in which all buildings and roads are elevated with wooden, and more recently concrete, structures.

Administratively, the urban settlement is located within the kampung of Bis Agats, which had a population of 8,998 in 2016.

=== Climate ===
Agats has a tropical rainforest climate (Köppen Af) with very heavy rainfall year-round.

Climate data for Agats
Month	Jan	Feb	Mar	Apr	May	Jun	Jul	Aug	Sep	Oct	Nov	Dec	Year
Mean daily maximum °C (°F)	31.7 (89.1)	31.6 (88.9)	31.7 (89.1)	31.6 (88.9)	31.0 (87.8)	29.9 (85.8)	29.1 (84.4)	29.3 (84.7)	30.2 (86.4)	31.1 (88.0)	32.0 (89.6)	31.9 (89.4)	30.9 (87.7)
Daily mean °C (°F)	27.2 (81.0)	27.2 (81.0)	27.3 (81.1)	27.3 (81.1)	26.8 (80.2)	26.0 (78.8)	25.4 (77.7)	25.4 (77.7)	26.0 (78.8)	26.7 (80.1)	27.4 (81.3)	27.5 (81.5)	26.7 (80.0)
Mean daily minimum °C (°F)	22.8 (73.0)	22.8 (73.0)	22.9 (73.2)	23.0 (73.4)	22.7 (72.9)	22.1 (71.8)	21.7 (71.1)	21.6 (70.9)	21.8 (71.2)	22.3 (72.1)	22.8 (73.0)	23.1 (73.6)	22.5 (72.4)
Average rainfall mm (inches)	308 (12.1)	330 (13.0)	427 (16.8)	414 (16.3)	420 (16.5)	336 (13.2)	388 (15.3)	420 (16.5)	391 (15.4)	368 (14.5)	284 (11.2)	324 (12.8)	4,410 (173.6)
Source: Climate-Data.org

== Transport and facilities ==
Agats is served by pioneer, government-subsidized flights from Merauke and Mimika through the nearby Ewer Airport (IATA: EWE), in addition to passenger boats to Timika and Merauke. Both the airport and the river port are planned for upgrades in 2019, allowing the airport to take larger ATR aircraft and the river port to take larger "Tol Laut" ships. Recently introduced electric motorcycles are used for transport in the city, with electrical charging stations run by PLN.

A public hospital is present in Agats. As the water of the Asewetz next to the town is brackish and polluted, the town largely depends on rainwater and bottled water, in addition to pumped water from another river nearby.

== Gallery ==
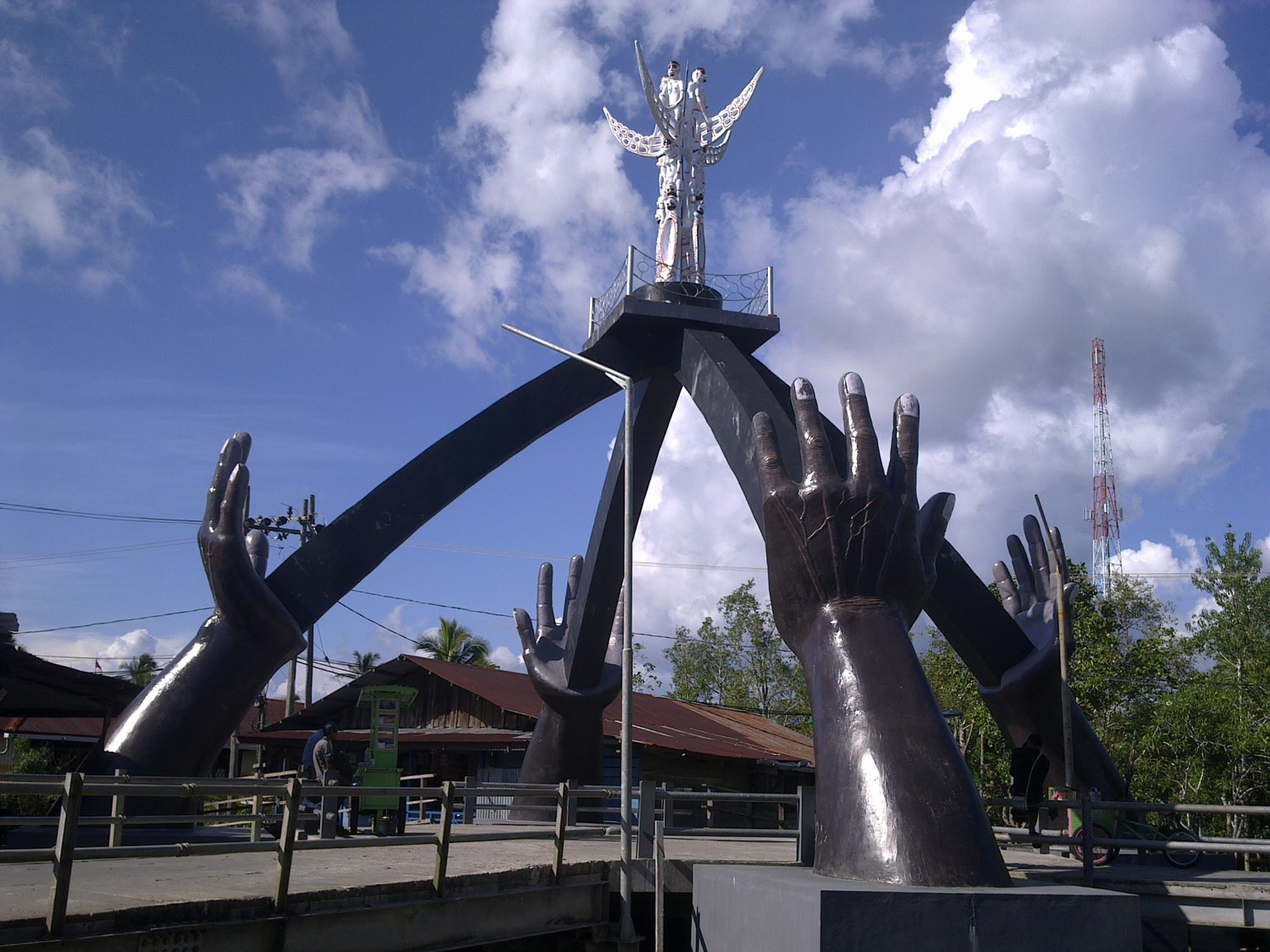
Icon of Asmat Regency

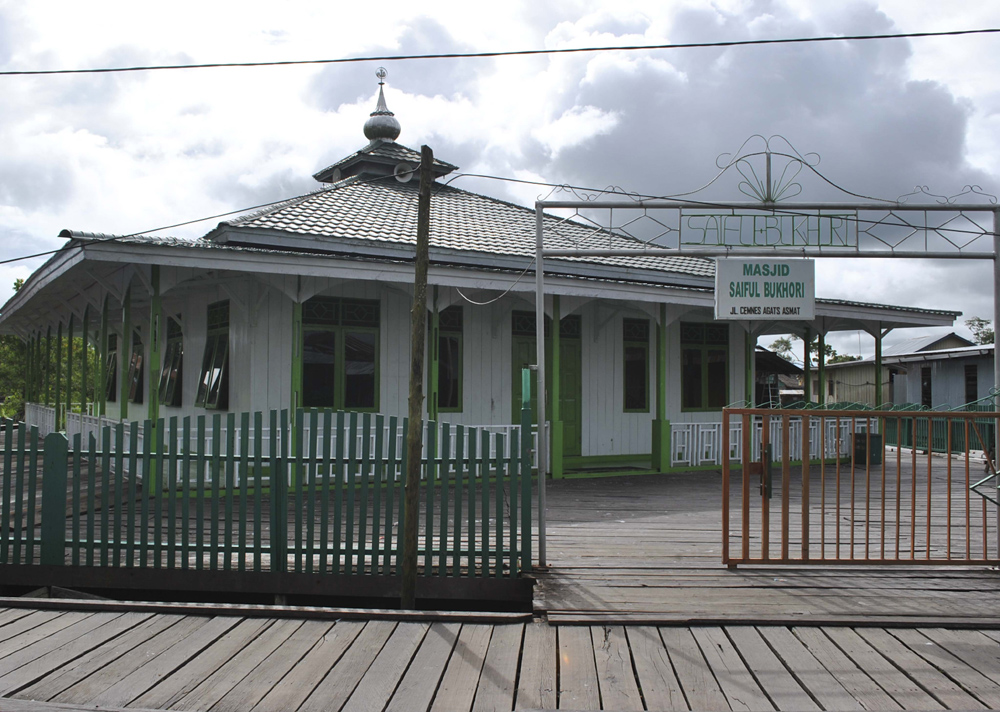
Mosque of Saiful Bukhori

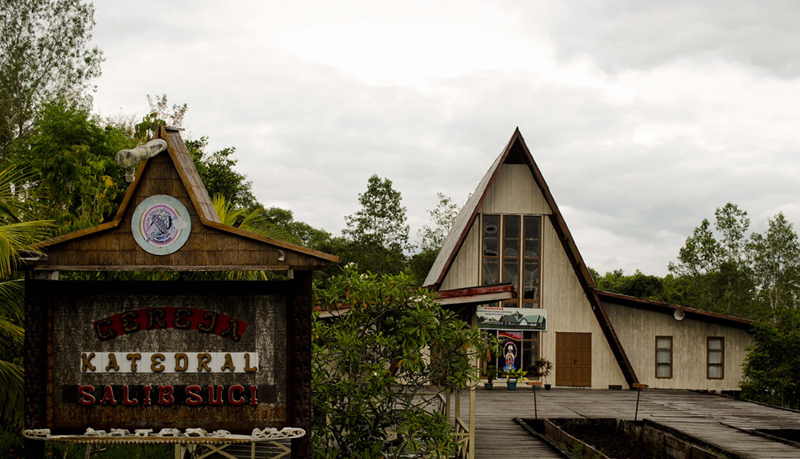
Salib Suci Cathedral Church, seen in 2014

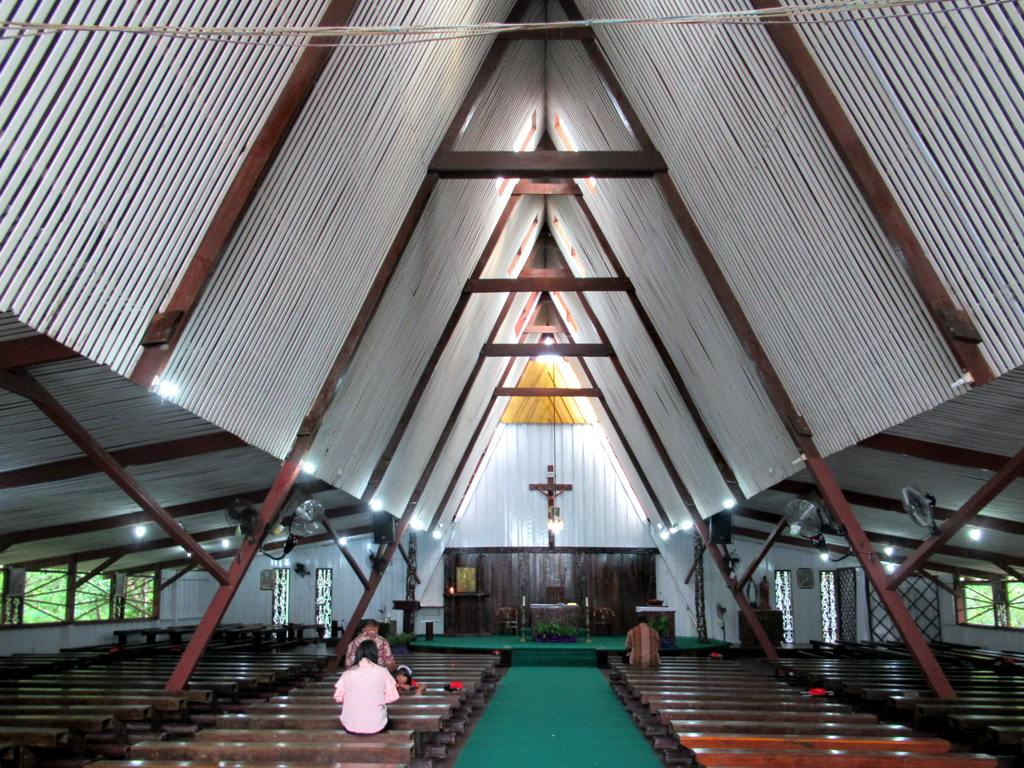
Interior of Salib Suci cathedral

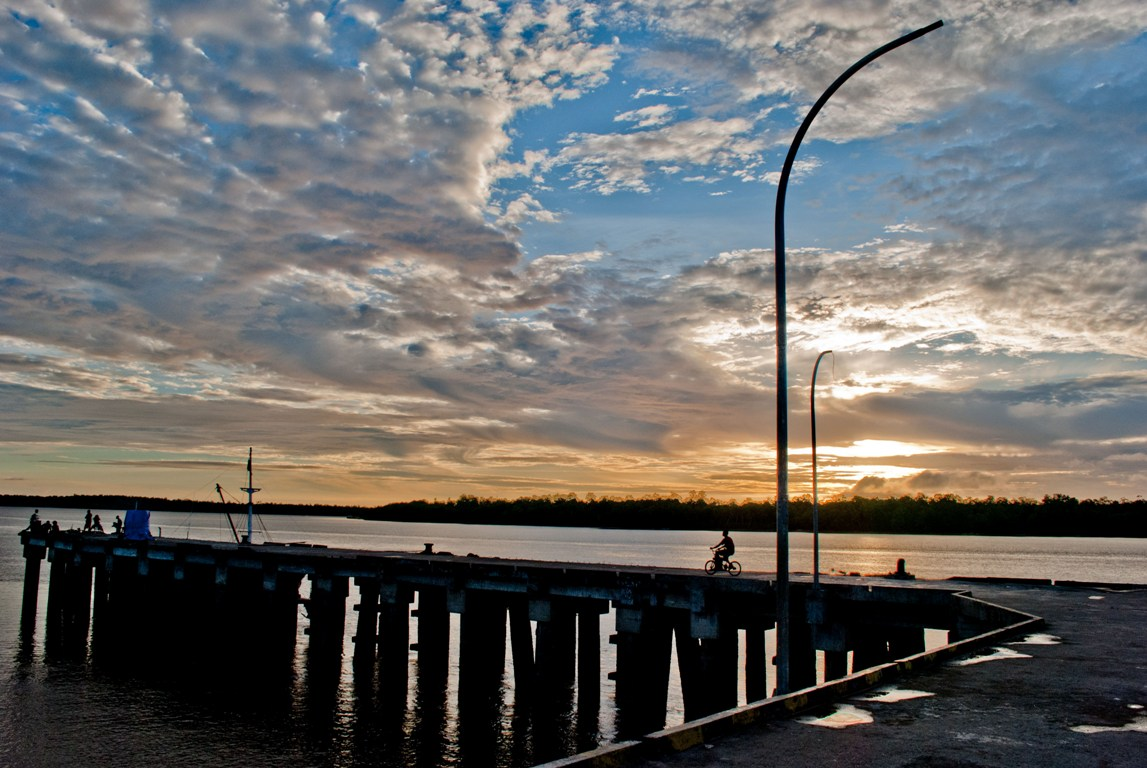
Port of Agats

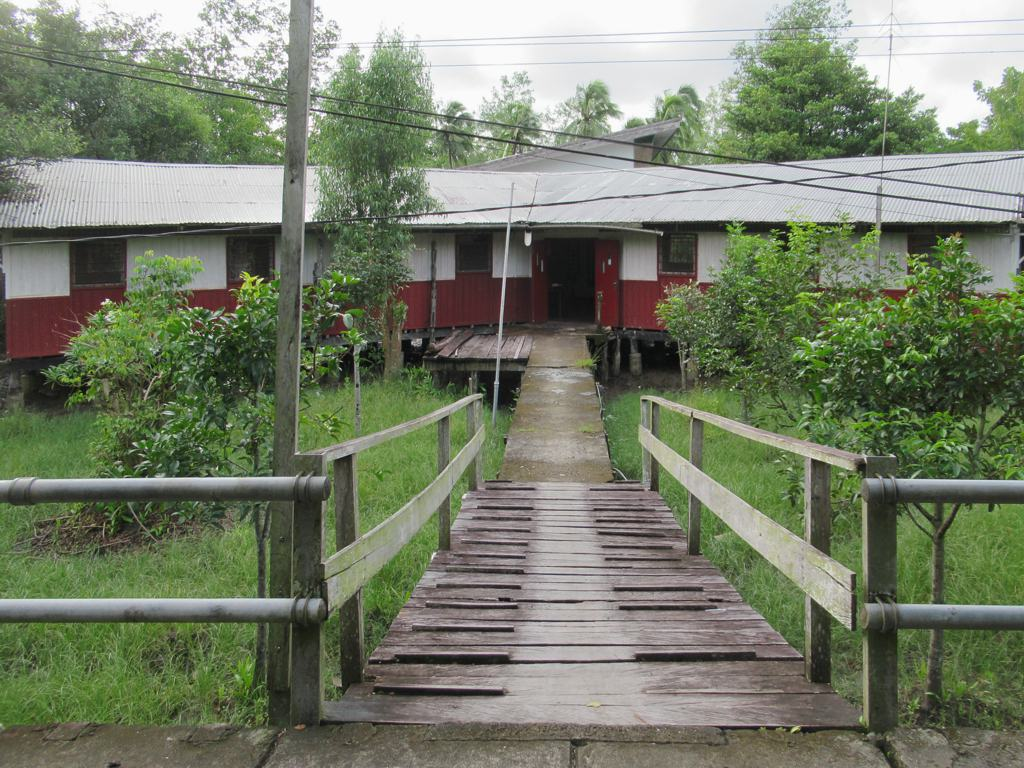
Exterior of the Asmat Museum of Culture and Progress

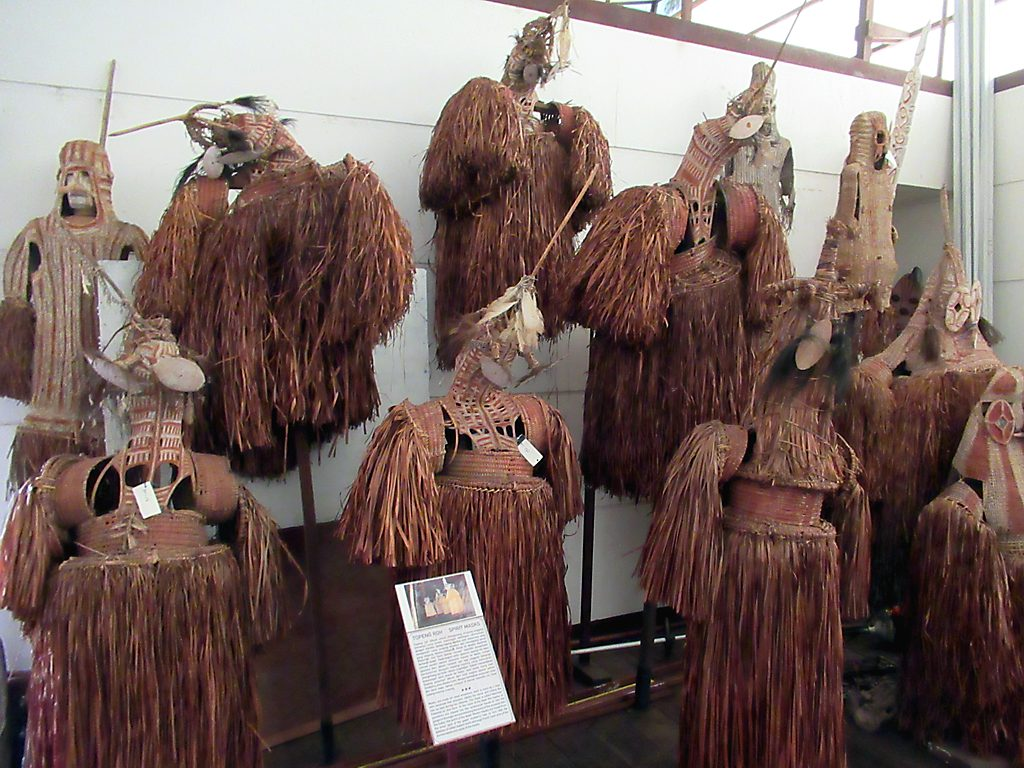
Paper mulberry spirit masks at the Asmat Museum of Culture and Progress

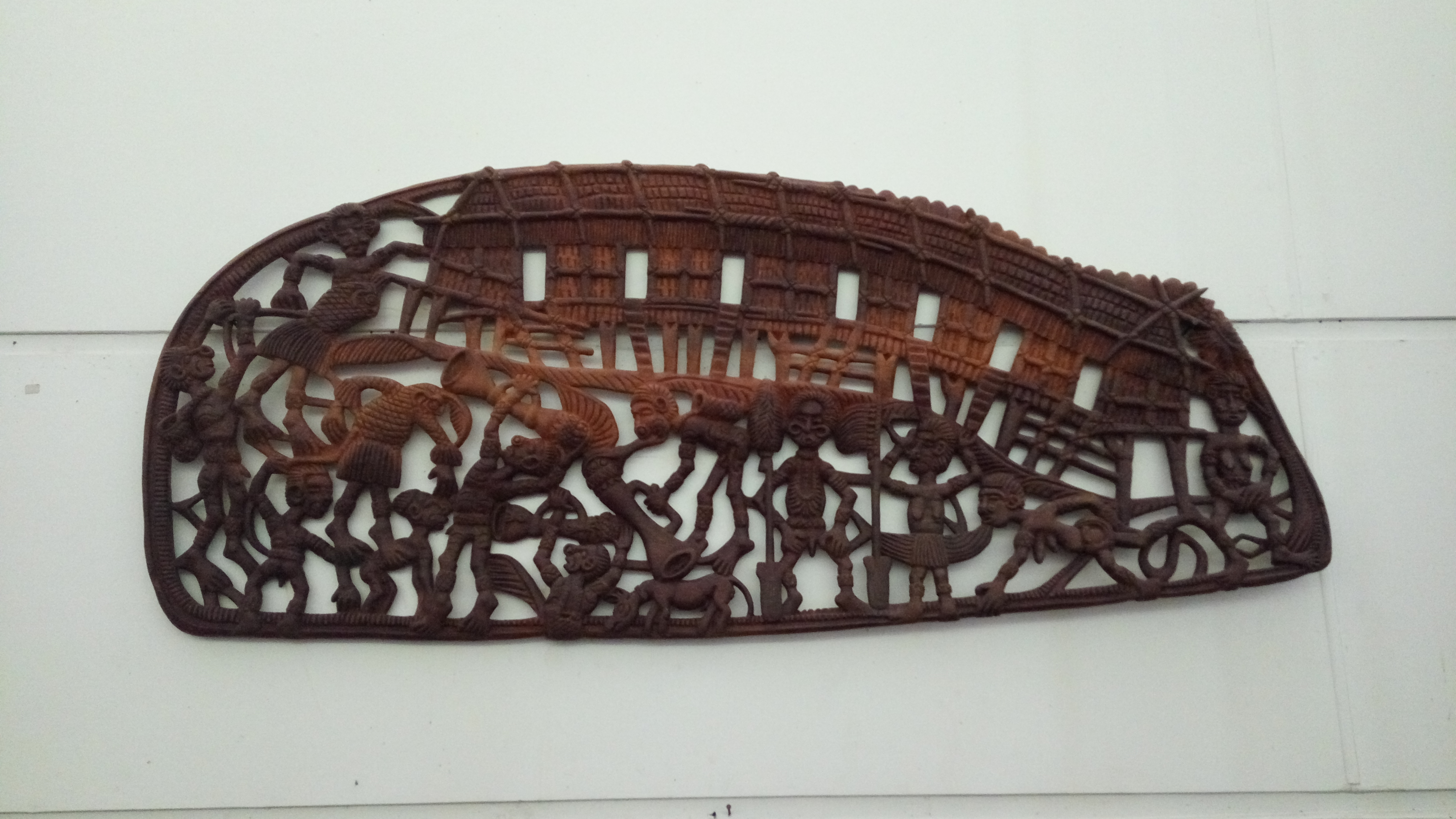
Asmat carving at the Asmat Museum of Culture and Progress

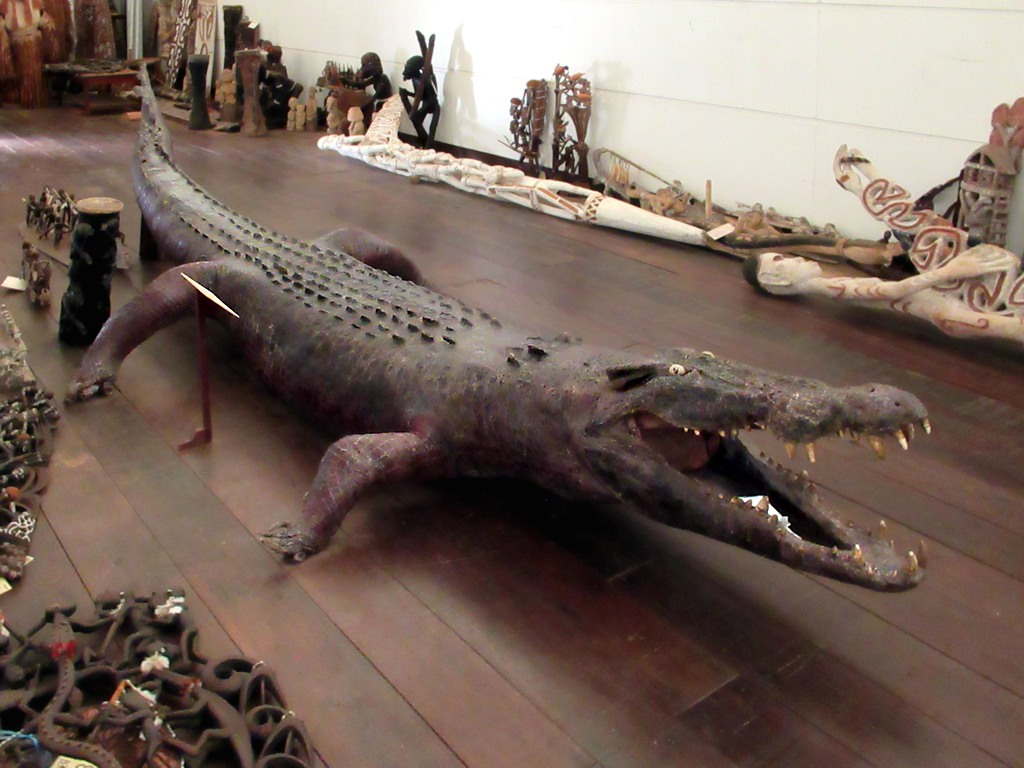
A male crocodile specimen on display at the Asmat Museum of Culture and Progress

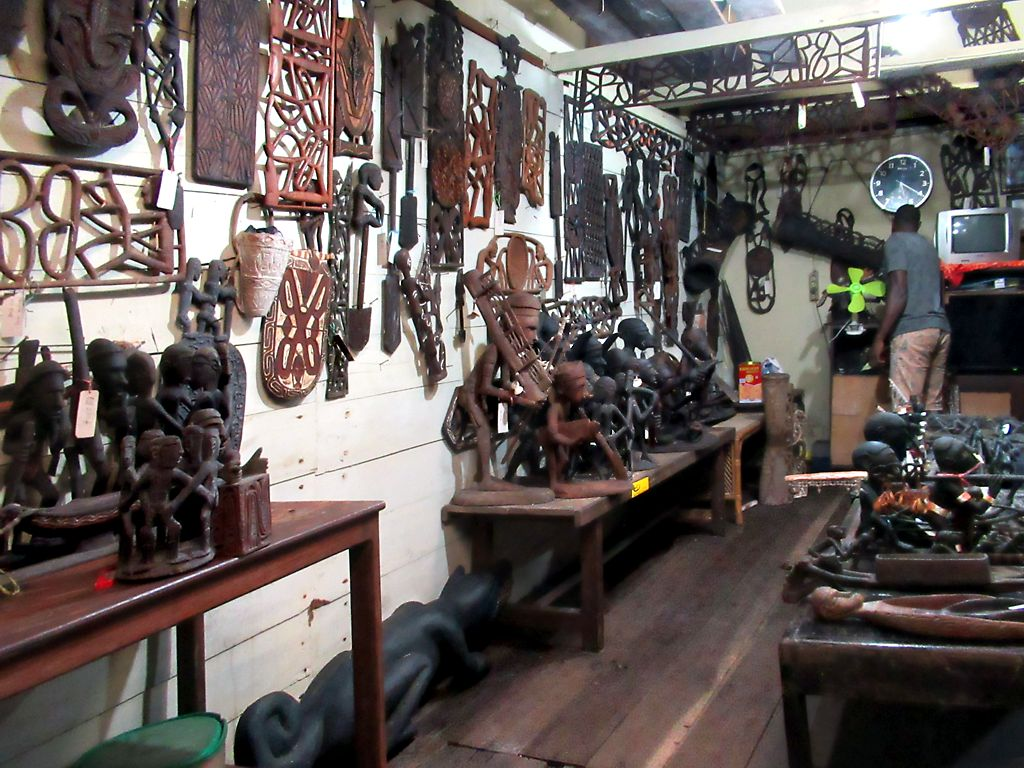
Asmat Queen Art Shop

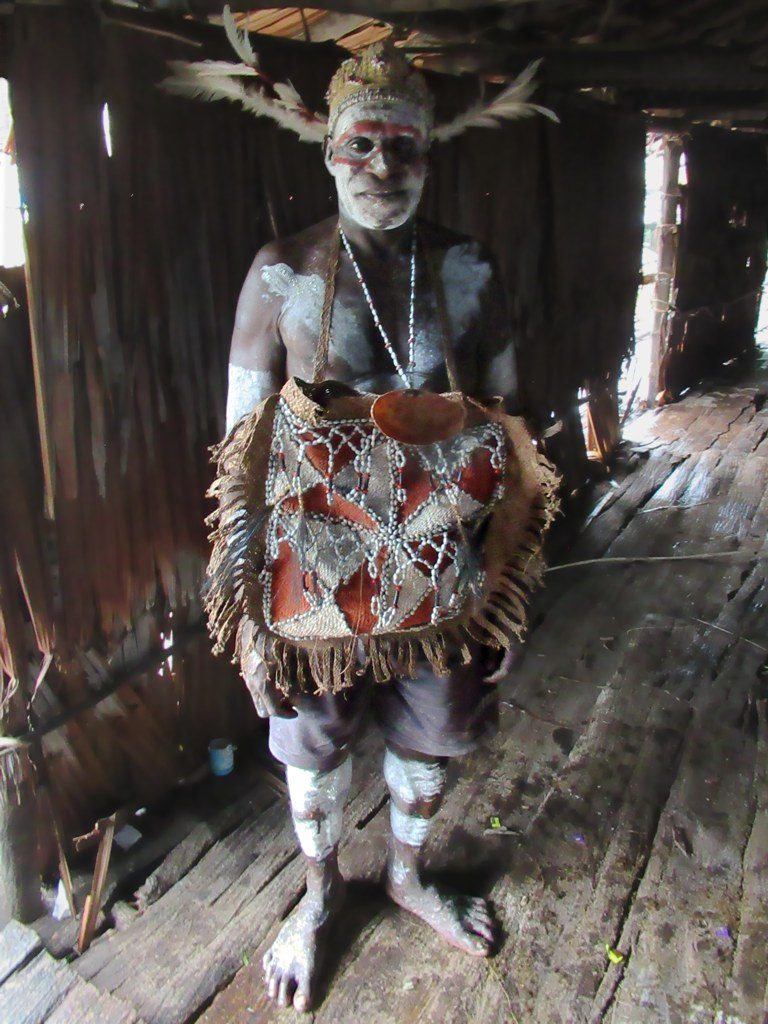
Asmat tribesman in Syuru village at Agats

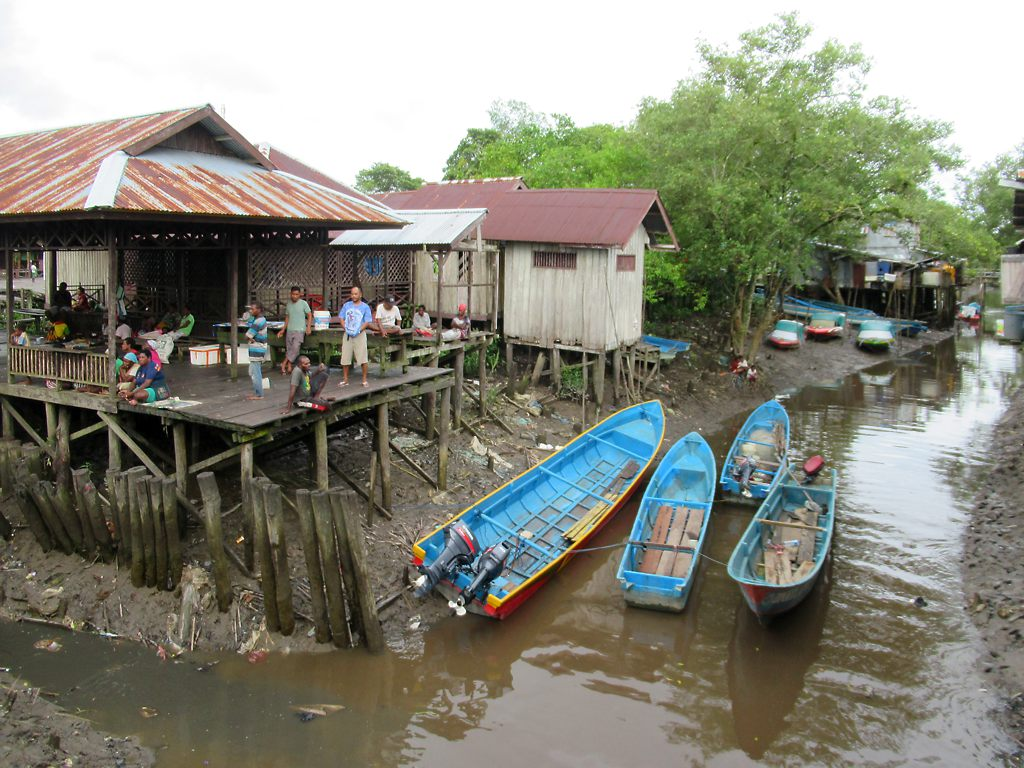
Canoes

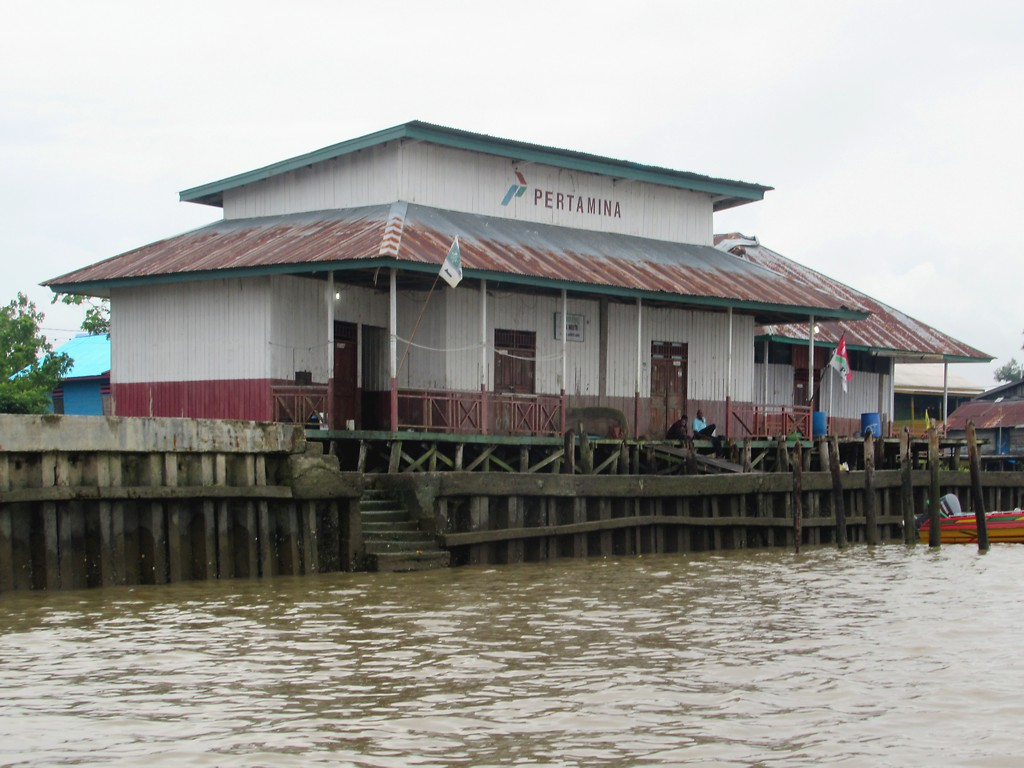
Local office of Indonesian oil company Pertamina

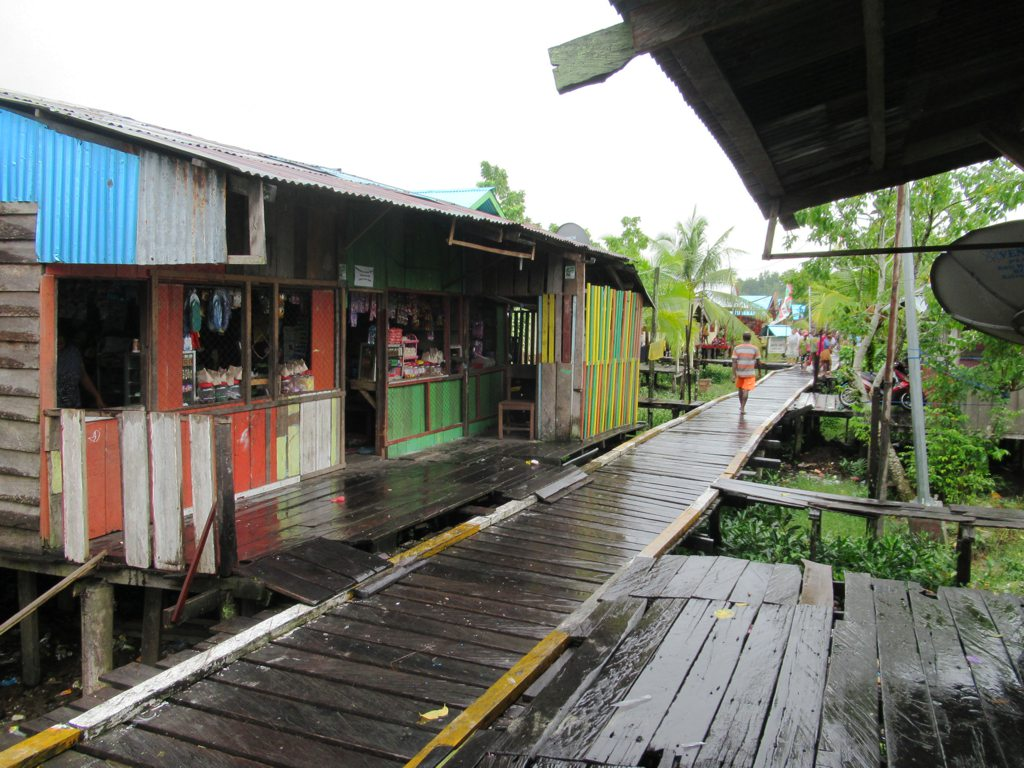
A shop in Syuru village, Agats

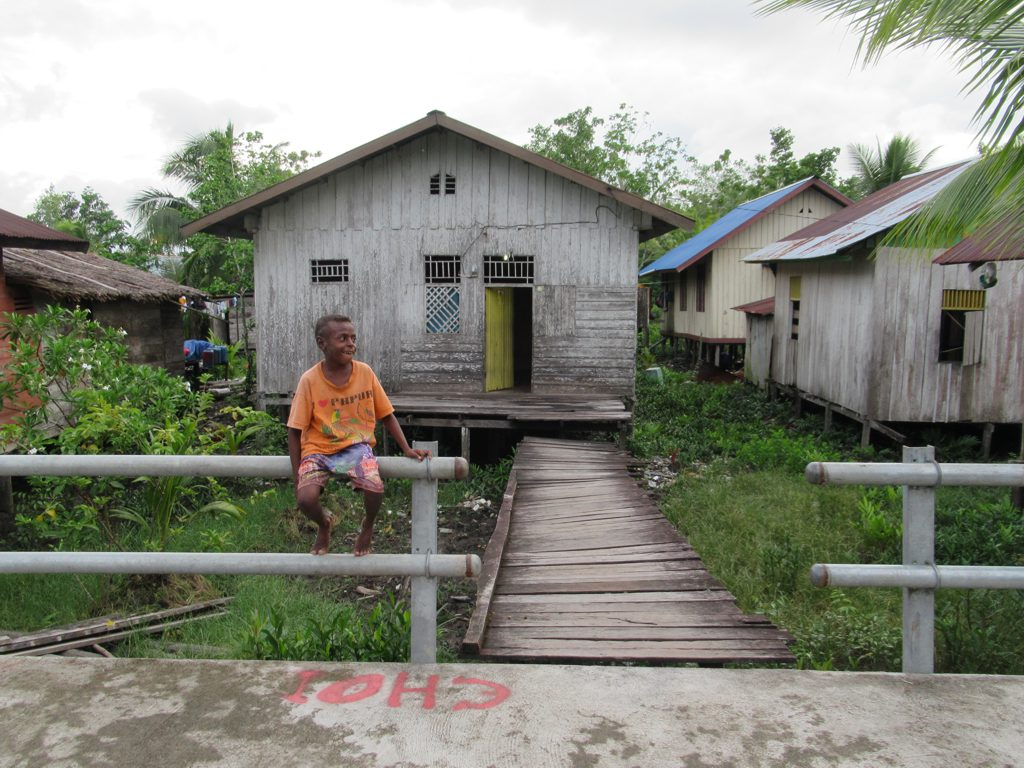
A house built on stilts

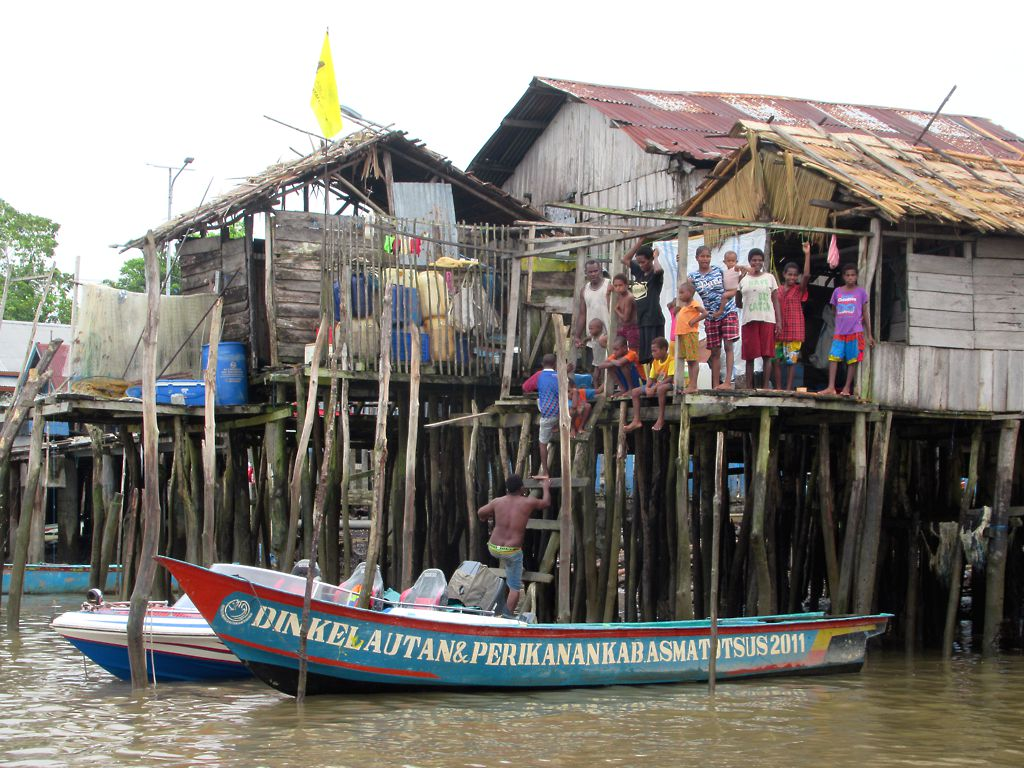
Homes on the Asewet River.

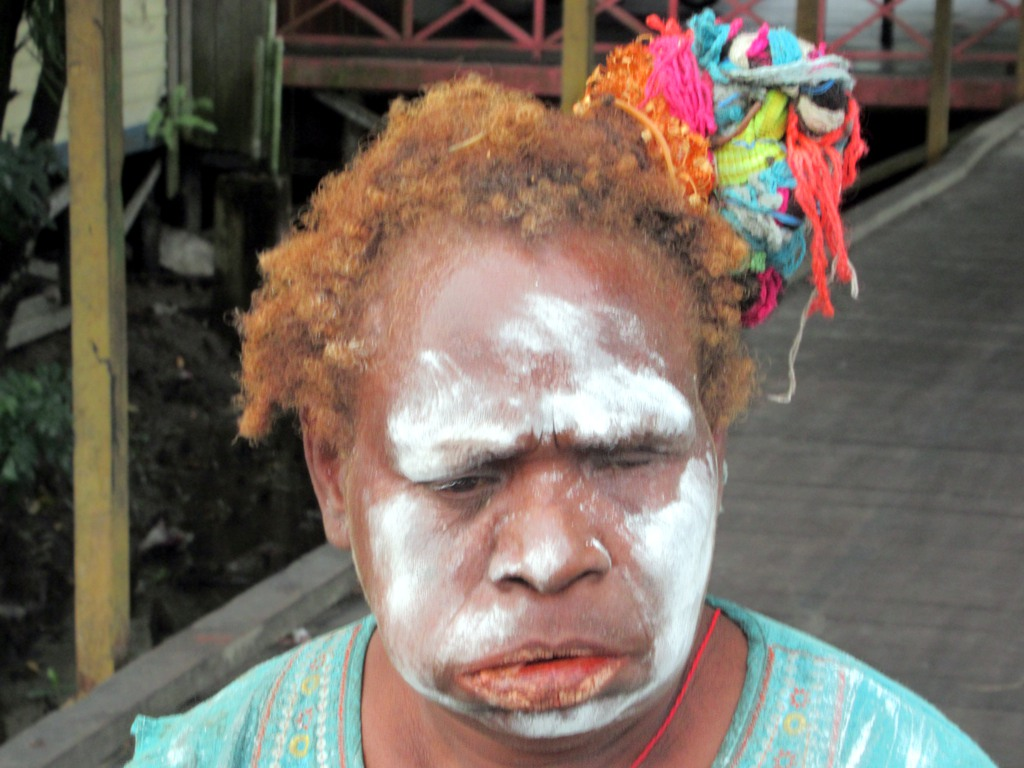
Papuan woman

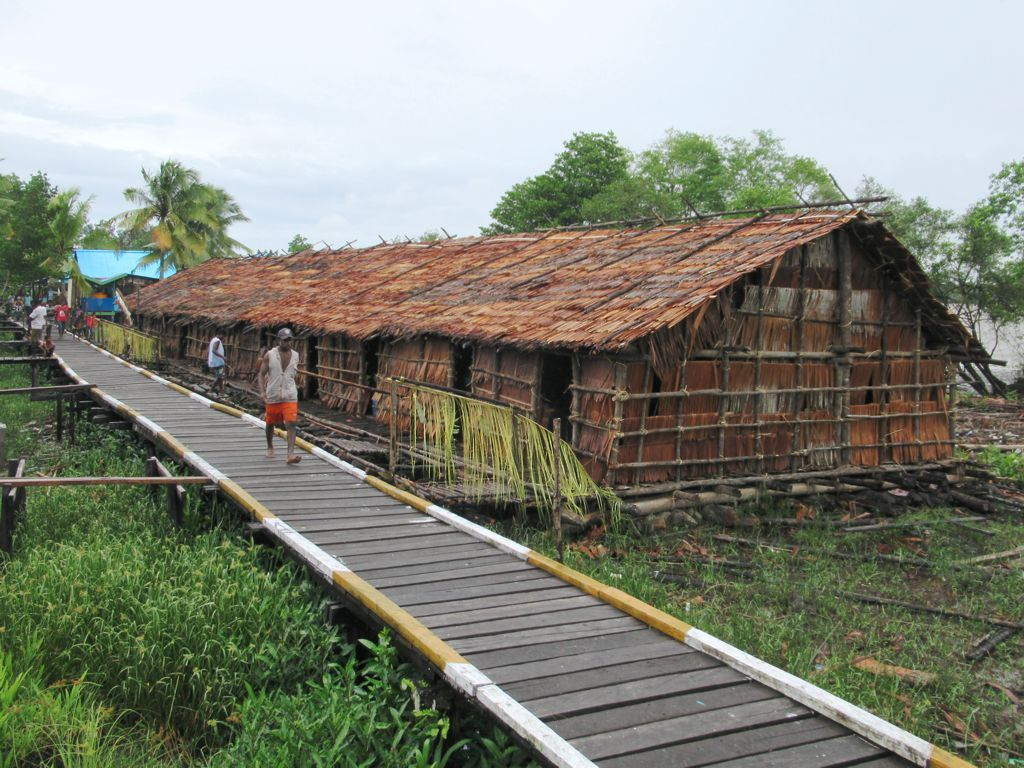
Ceremonial house in Syuru village

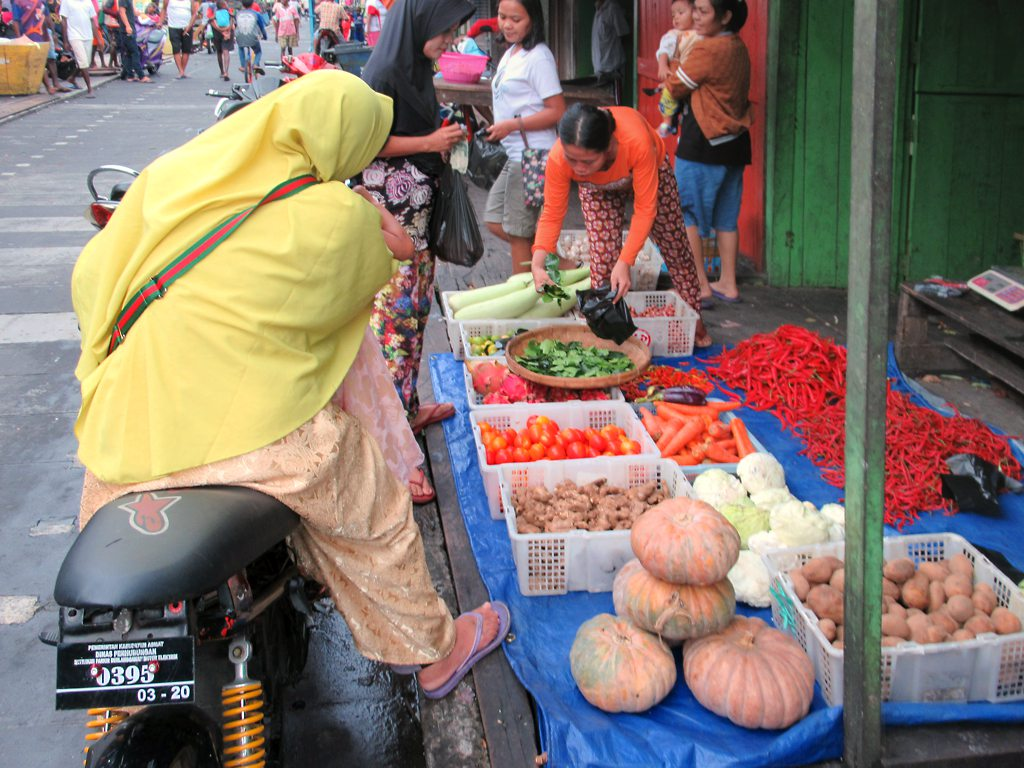
Streetside shopper

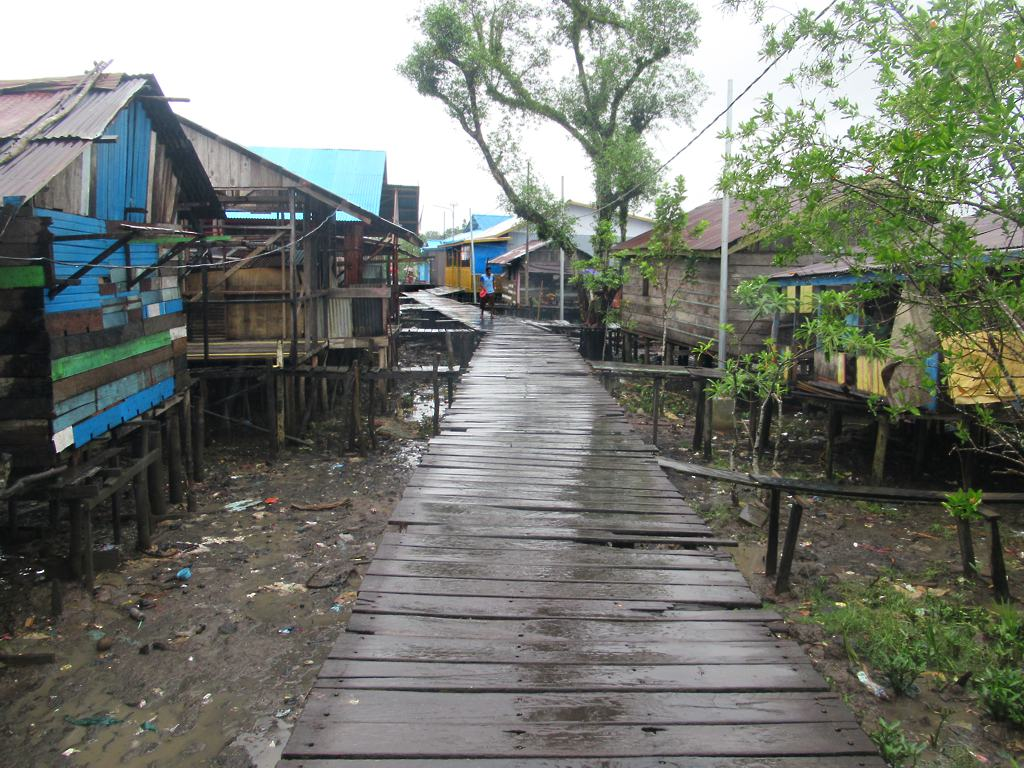
Wooden walkways in Syuru village

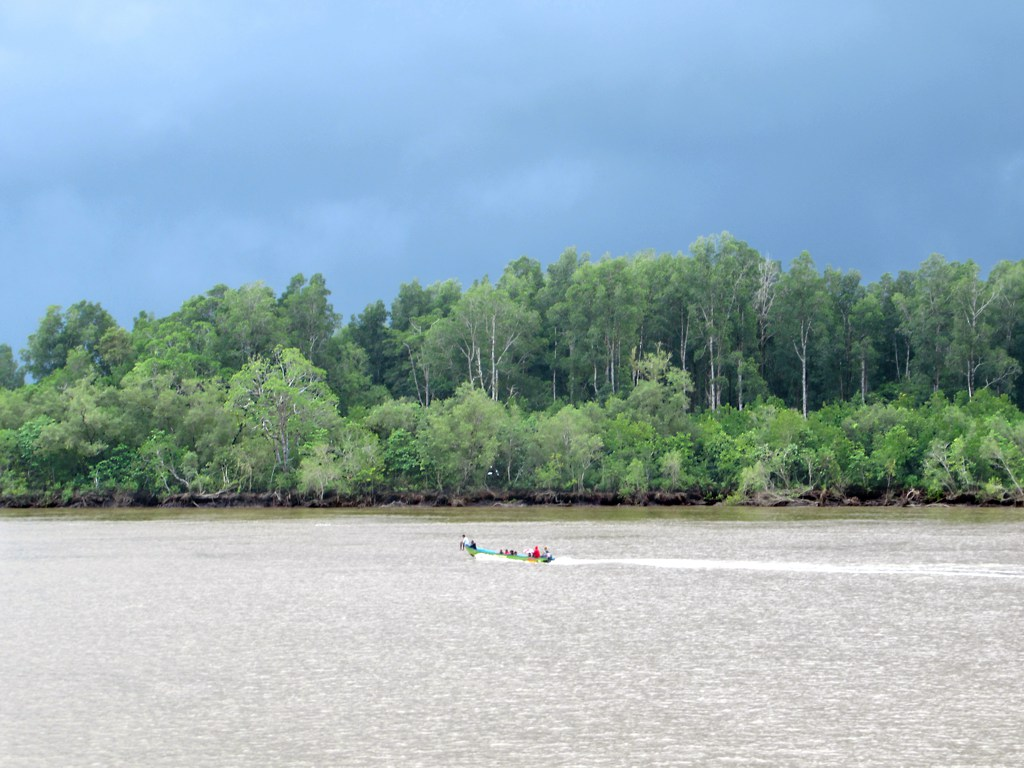
Asewet River

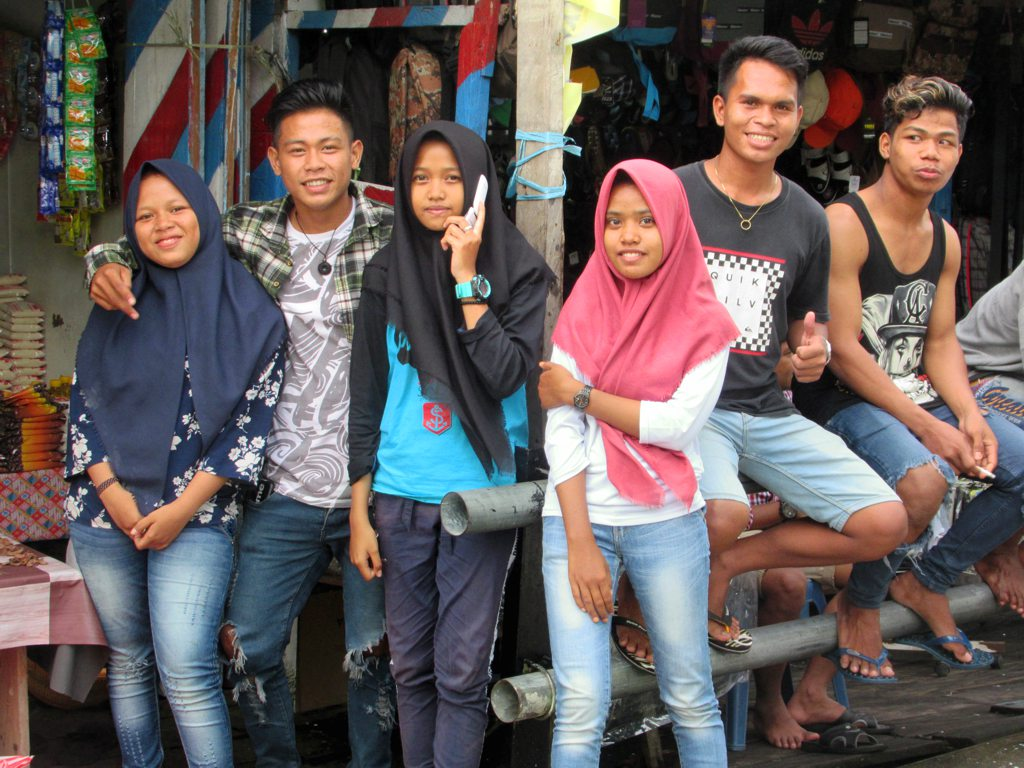
Javanese youths in Agats

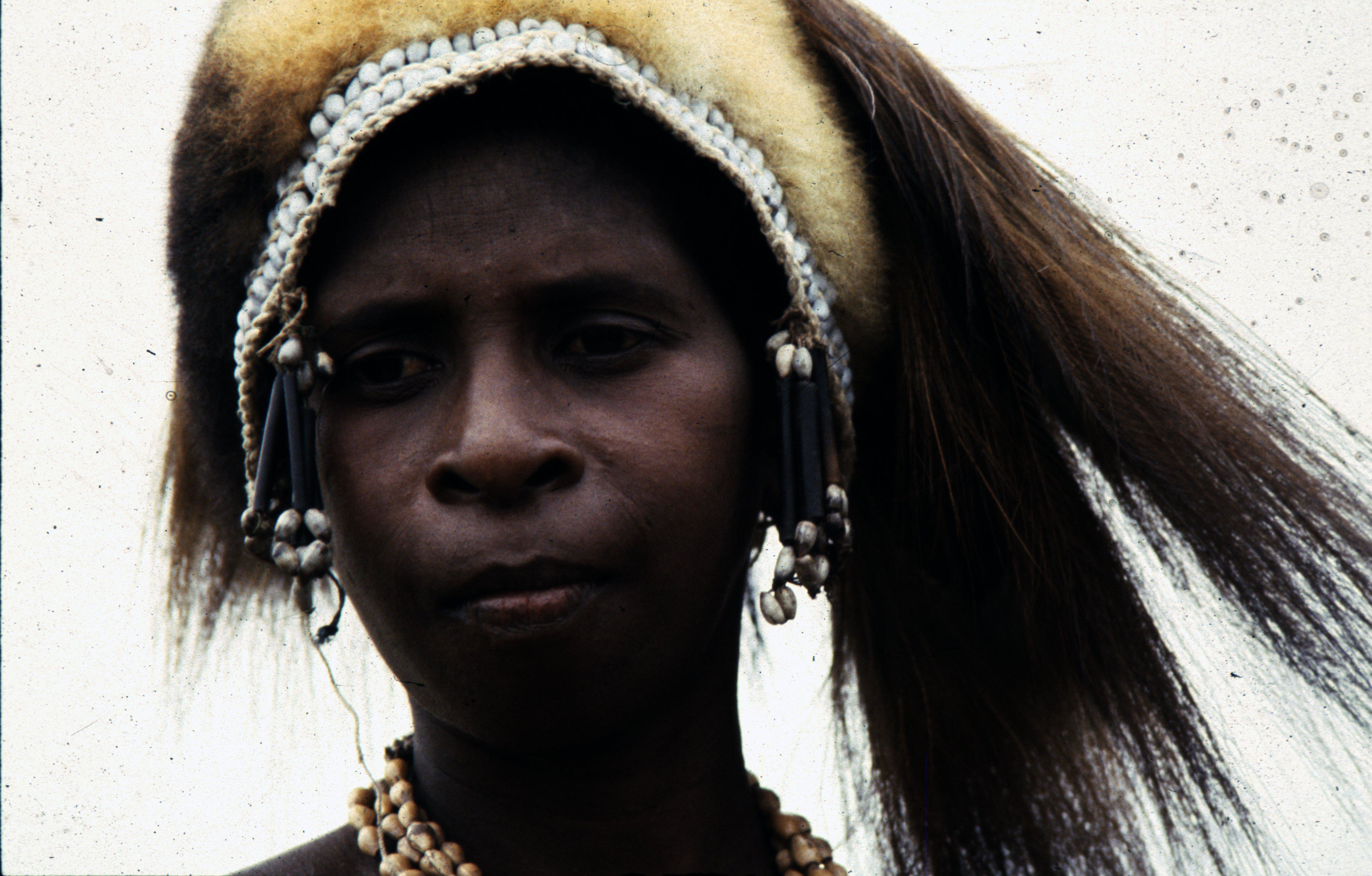
Woman of Agats, date unknown

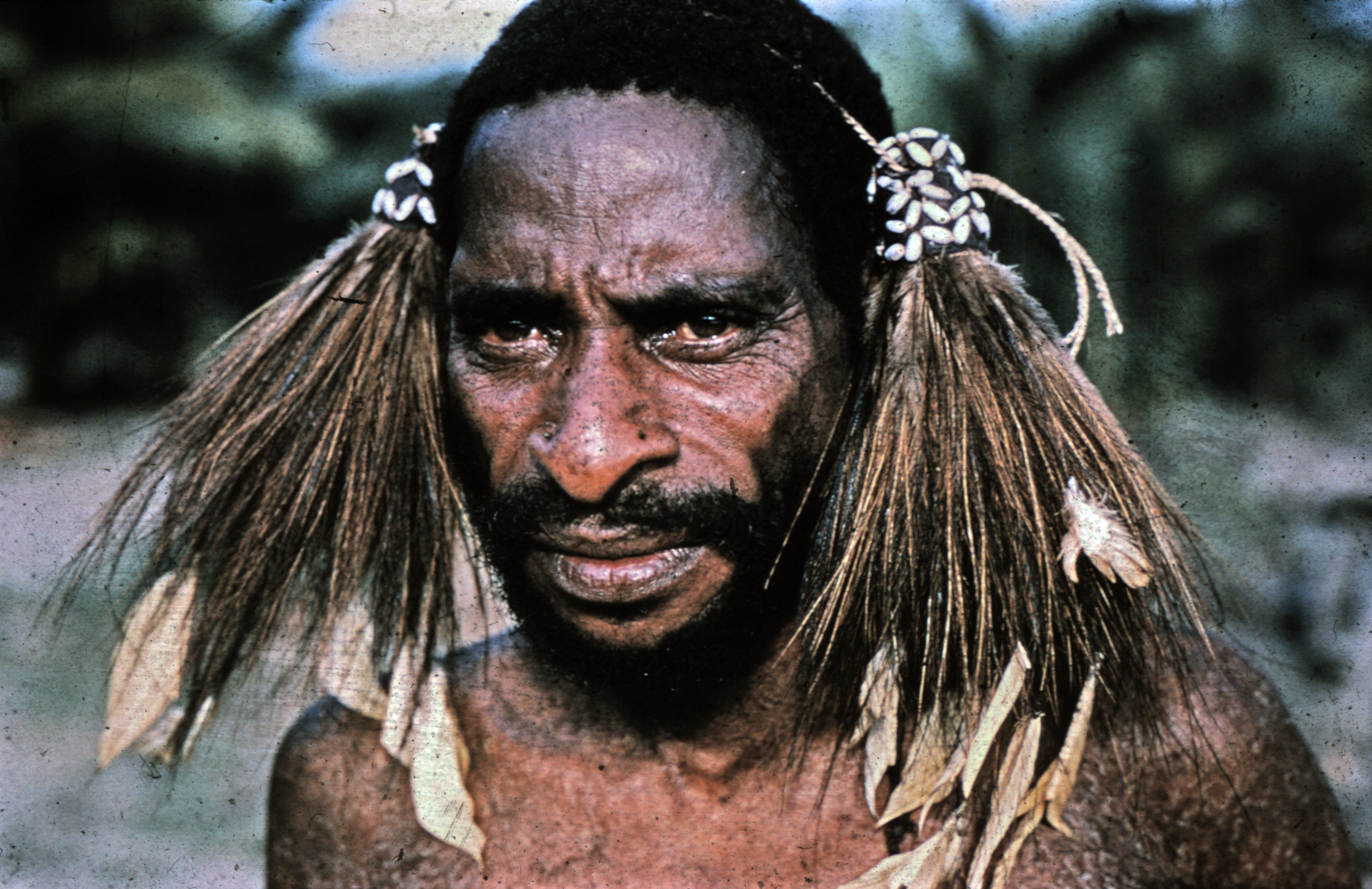
Man of Agats, date unknown

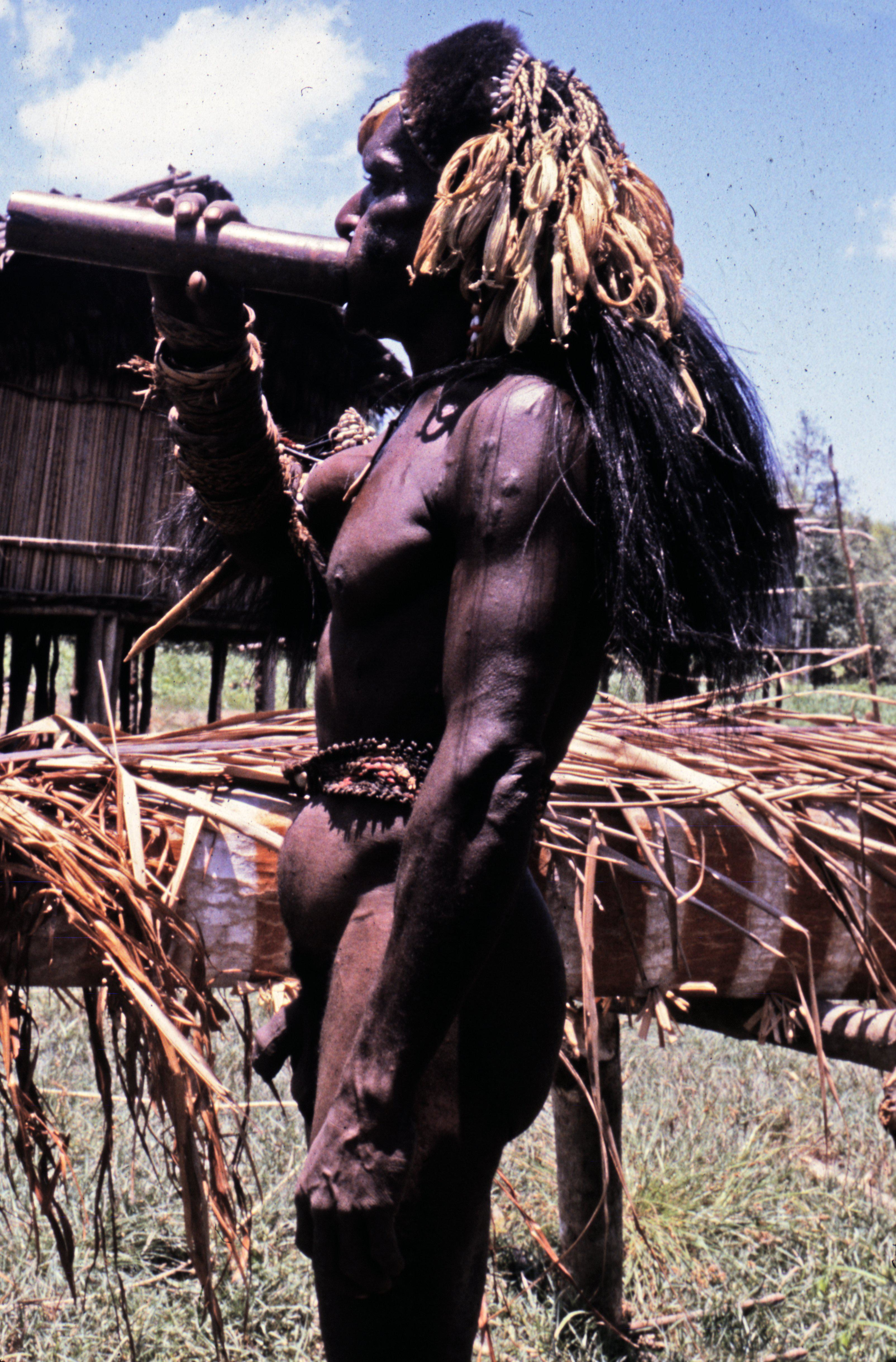
Man of Agats, date unknown

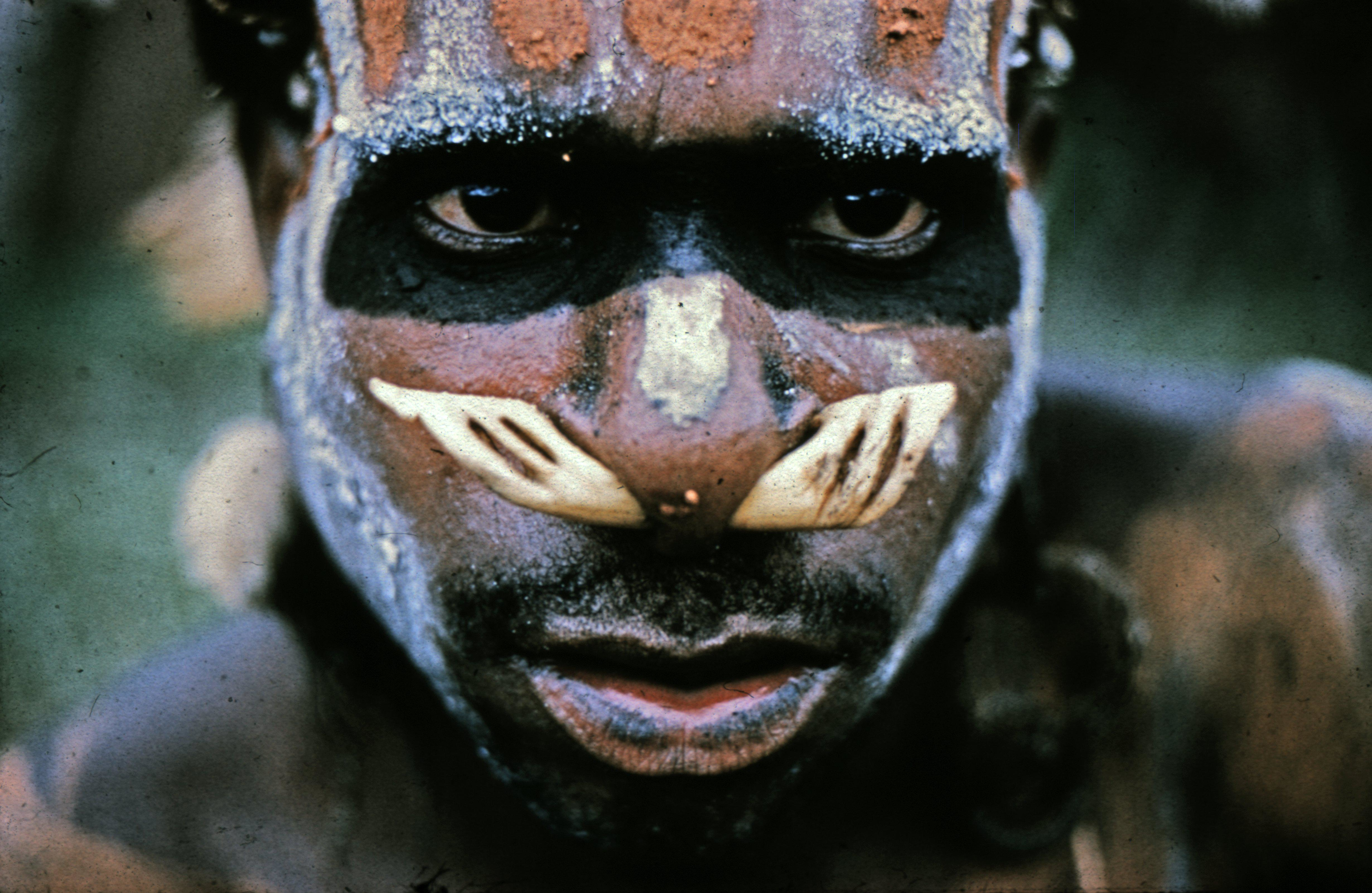
Man of Agats, date unknown

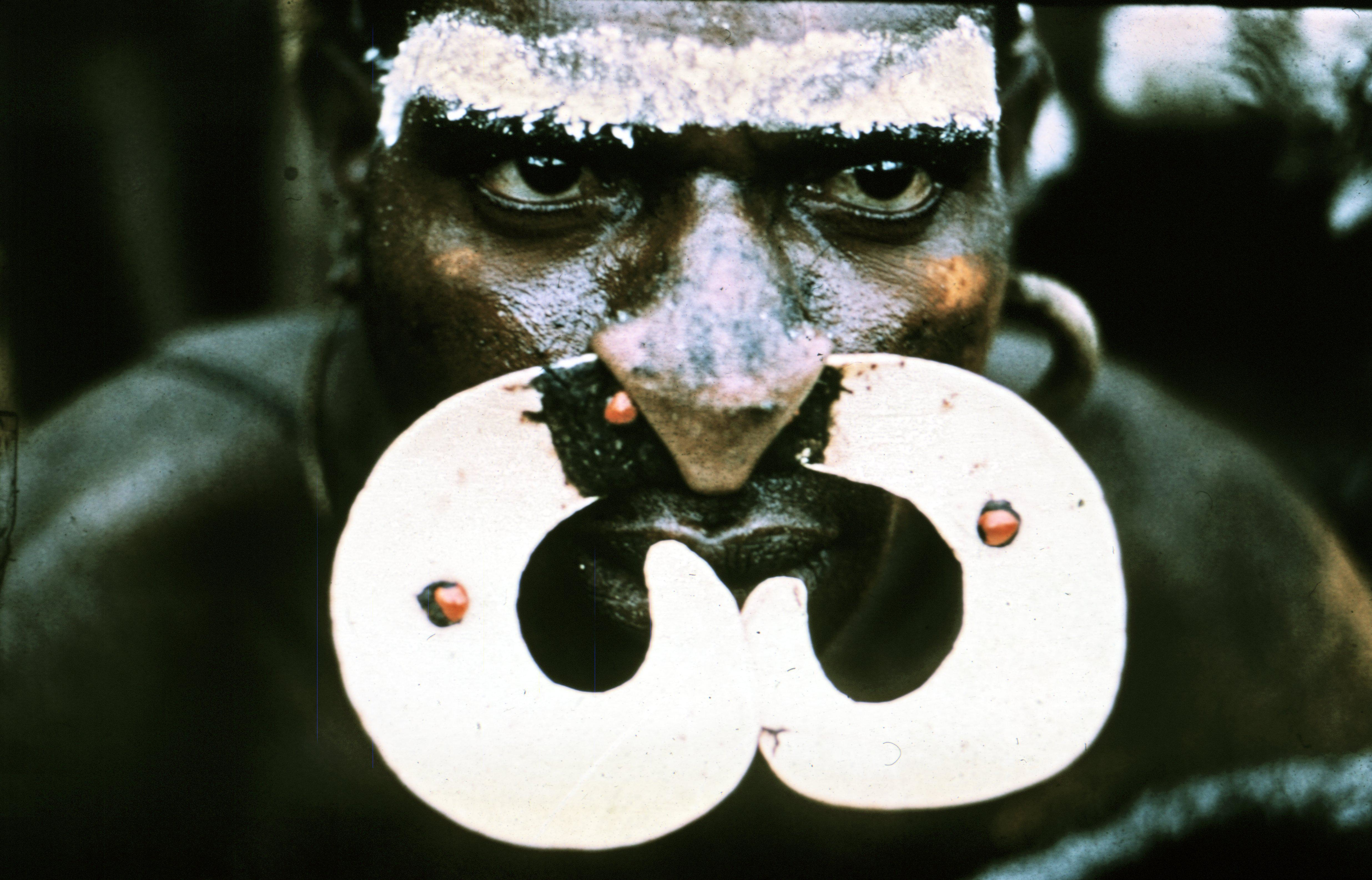
Man of Agats, date unknown

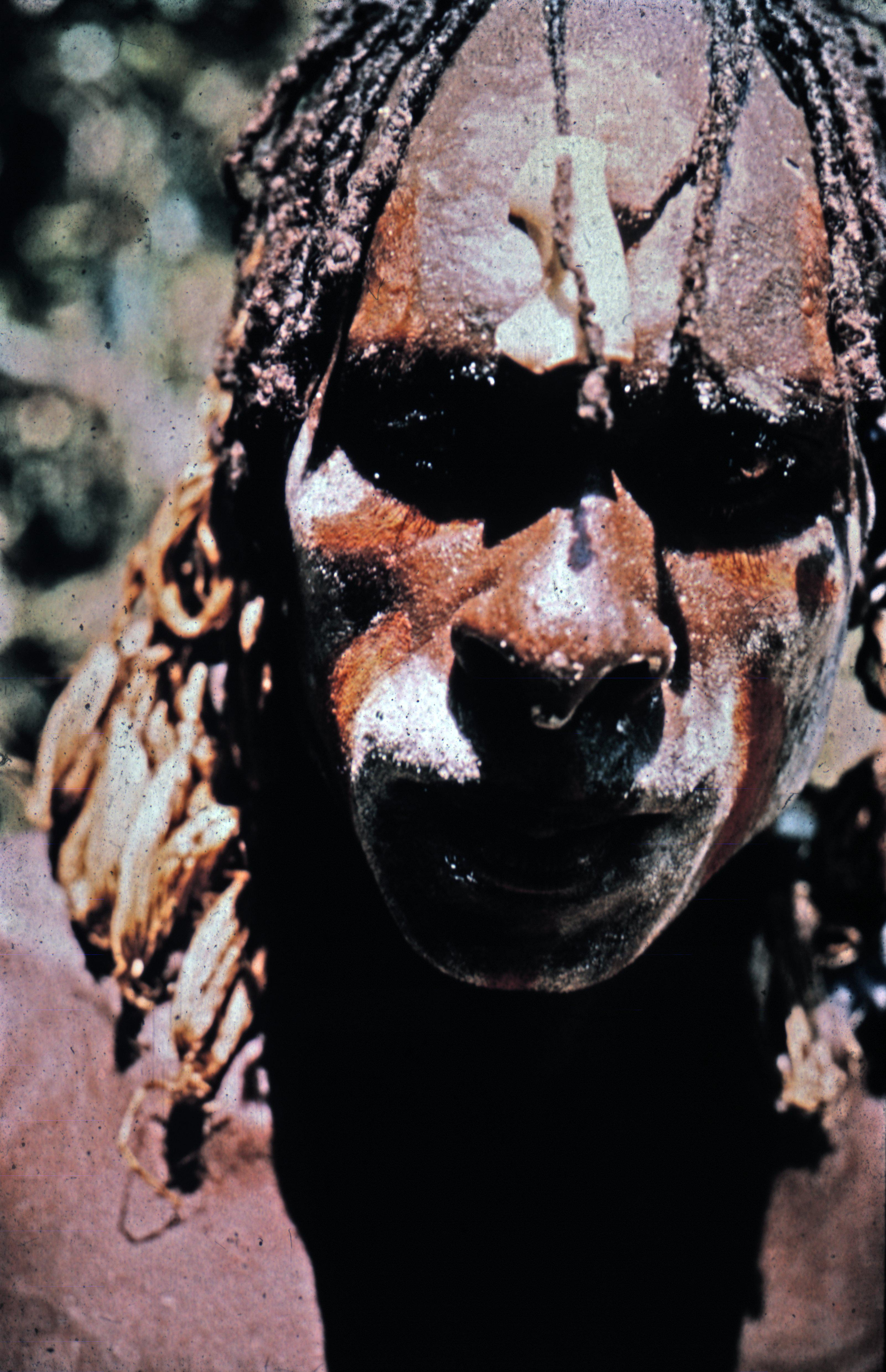
Man of Agats, date unknown

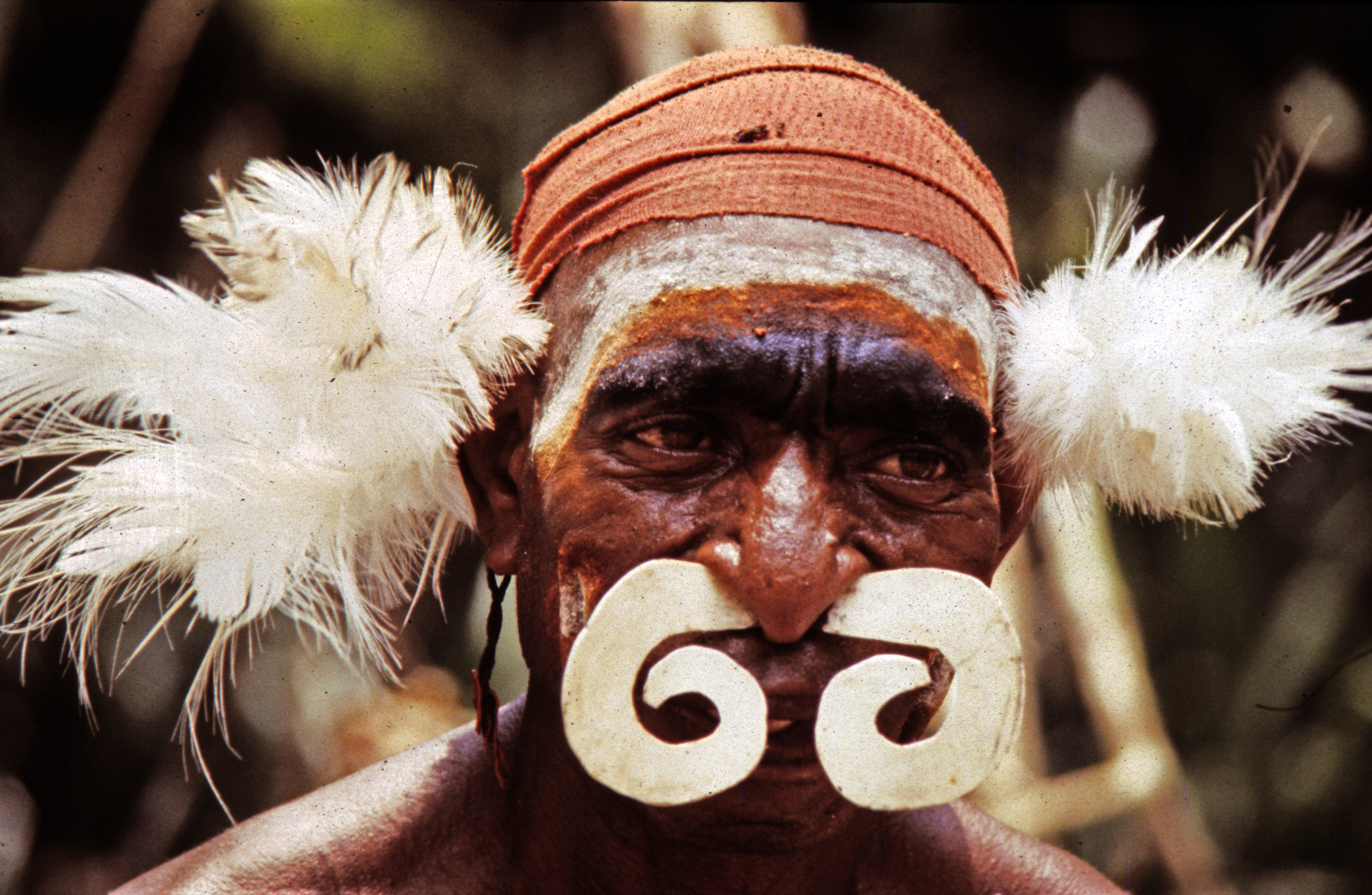
Man of Agats, date unknown
