= Jacobus Duivenvoorde =

Jacobus Duivenvoorde MSC
- Archbishop of Merauke
- Church: Catholic Church
- Archdiocese: Archdiocese of Merauke
- In office: 26 June 1972 – 7 April 2004
- Predecessor: Herman Tillemans
- Successor: Nicolaus Adi Seputra

Orders
- Ordination: 5 September 1954
- Consecration: 1 October 1972 by Herman Tillemans

Personal details
- Born: 15 November 1928 Beverwijk, North Holland, Kingdom of the Netherlands
- Died: 16 November 2011 (aged 83)

Jacobus Duivenvoorde (15 November 1928 – 16 November 2011) was the Catholic archbishop of the Roman Catholic Archdiocese of Merauke, Indonesia.

Ordained to the priesthood in 1954, Duivenvoorde was named a bishop in 1972, retiring in 2004.

He died on 16 November 2011, at the age of 83.

== Notes ==
Catholic Church titles
Preceded by Herman Tillemans, M.S.C.	Archbishop of Merauke; 26 June 1972–7 April 2004	Succeeded by Nicolaus Adi Seputra, M.S.C.
