= Tobias Schneebaum =

American artist, anthropologist and AIDS activist (1922–2005)

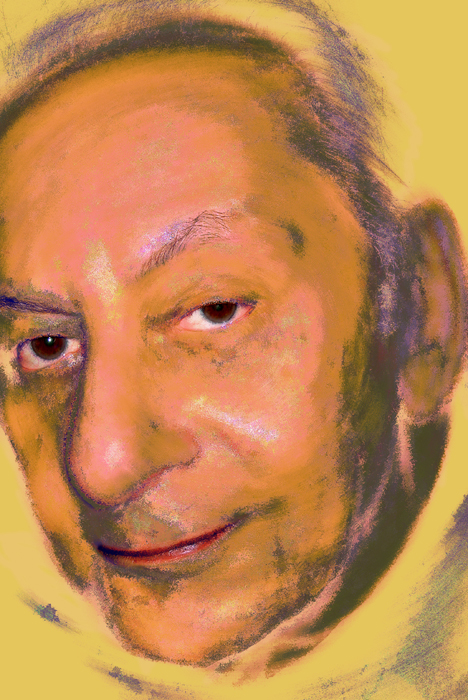
- Born: Toivele Schneebaum; March 25, 1922; Lower East Side, Manhattan, New York, U.S.
- Died: September 20, 2005 (aged 83); Great Neck, New York, U.S.
- Other name: Theodore Schneebaum
- Education: City College of New York
- Occupations: artist, anthropologist, and AIDS activist
- Notable work: Keep the River on Your Right, Asmat Museum of Culture and Progress

Tobias Schneebaum (March 25, 1922 – September 20, 2005) was an American artist, anthropologist, and AIDS activist. He is best known for his experiences living and traveling among the Harakmbut people of Peru, and the Asmat people of Papua, Indonesia.

== Early life ==
Schneebaum was born into a family of Jewish emigres from Poland in New York City. Schneebaum's father Jacob (known as Yankle) immigrated to America from Poland just before World War I, in which he served in order to get U.S. citizenship. His mother, Riftcha, emigrated in 1913.

He was born as Toivele Schneebaum on Manhattan's Lower East Side and grew up in Brooklyn. A school official later changed this to Theodore Schneebaum, by which he was known by friends and family throughout his childhood. (He later changed his name legally to Tobias.) In 1939 he graduated from the Stuyvesant High School, moving on to the City College of New York, graduating in 1943 after majoring in mathematics and art. During World War II he served as a radar repairman in the U.S. Army.

== Travels ==
In 1947, after briefly studying painting with Rufino Tamayo at the Brooklyn Museum of Art, Schneebaum went to live and paint in Mexico for three years, living among the Lacandon tribe. In 1955 he won a Fulbright fellowship to travel and paint in Peru. After hitch-hiking from New York to Peru, he lived with the Harakmbut people for seven months, and said he had joined the tribe in cannibalism on one occasion.

He recounted his journey into the jungles of Peru in the 1969 memoir Keep the River on Your Right.

Until 1970 he was the designer at Tiber Press, then in 1973 he embarked on his third overseas trip to Papua, then known as Irian Jaya, where he lived with the Asmat people on the south-western coast. He helped establish the Asmat Museum of Culture and Progress.

In 1999, he revisited both Irian Jaya and Peru for a documentary film, Keep the River on Your Right: A Modern Cannibal Tale.

== Later life ==
Schneebaum spent the final years of his life in Westbeth Artists Community, an artists' commune in Greenwich Village, New York City, also home to Merce Cunningham and Diane Arbus, and died in 2005 in Great Neck, New York of Parkinson's disease. He bequeathed his renowned Asmat shield collection to the Metropolitan Museum of Art in New York City and his personal papers are preserved within the Jean-Nickolaus Tretter Collection in Gay, Lesbian, Bisexual and Transgender Studies.

== Awards ==
Schneebaum received a Master of Arts in anthropology at The New School in New York City, and another from Goddard College, Plainfield, Vermont.

== Bibliography ==
- Schneebaum created the silkscreen illustrations for the 1954 book The Girl in the Abstract Bed (text by Vance Bourjaily)
- Schneebaum illustrated the 1959 rhyming children's book Jungle Journey by well-known poet Mary Britton Miller, which was the first "book" version of his disappearance in the Peruvian Amazon. He had told the story to Miller.
- Keep the River on Your Right (1969)
- Wild Man (1979)
- Asmat: Life with the Ancestors (1981)
- Asmat Images: The Asmat Museum of Culture and Progress (1985)
- Where the Spirits Dwell: An Odyssey in the Jungle of New Guinea (1989)
- Embodied Spirits: Ritual Carvings of the Asmat (1990)
- Secret Places: My Life in New York & New Guinea (2000)
- He also was a contributor to People of the River, People of the Tree: Change & Continuity in Sepik & Asmat Art (1989)
- Keep the River on Your Right: A Modern Cannibal Tale, documentary film directed by brother and sister (and fellow Stuyvesant alumni) David Shapiro and Laurie Gwen Shapiro - won a 2001 Independent Spirit Award (2000)
