= Laurie Gwen Shapiro =

American writer and filmmaker

Laurie Gwen Shapiro is an American writer and filmmaker born and raised in New York City, where she currently resides.

== Early life and education ==
Shapiro is a graduate of Stuyvesant High School and Syracuse University's Newhouse School of Communications (1988).

== Career ==
Her 2001 documentary film Keep the River on Your Right: A Modern Cannibal Tale, which she co-produced and co-directed with her brother, the artist David Shapiro, received numerous awards, including:

- Best Documentary Feature; Hamptons International Film Festival, 2000
- Special Jury Award; International Documentary Film Festival Amsterdam, 2000
- Audience Award, Special Critics Award; Los Angeles Independent Film Festival, 2000
- Truer Than Fiction Award; IFP Independent Spirit Awards, 2001
- Best Documentary; Newport Beach Film Festival, 2001
- Nominated for 2010 Emmy for Finishing Heaven – Producer

Her semi-autobiographical first novel, The Unexpected Salami, was named an ALA Notable Book in 1998.

== Books ==
- (1998) The Unexpected Salami (Algonquin Books)
- (2004) The Anglophile (Red Dress Ink)
- (2005) The Matzo Ball Heiress (Red Dress Ink)
- (2006) Brand X: The Boyfriend Account (Random House)
- (2018) The Stowaway: A Young Man's Extraordinary Adventure to Antarctica (Simon & Schuster)
- (2019) Passager Clandestin, éditions Paulsen
- (2025) The Aviator and the Showman: Amelia Earhart, George Putnam, and the Marriage that Made an American Icon published on July 15, 2025 (Random House)

== Films ==
- (1999) The McCourts of Limerick (Cinemax) (co-producer)
- (2000) The McCourts of New York (Cinemax) (co-producer)
- (2001) Keep The River on Your Right: A Modern Cannibal Tale (IFC) (co-producer/co-director)
- (2008) Finishing Heaven (HBO) (producer)
- (2013) The Manor (executive producer)

== Plays ==
- (2002) Inventing Color
