= Archdiocese of Merauke =

Roman Catholic archdiocese on Papua, Indonesia

Coordinates: 8°28′S 140°20′E

Archdiocese of Merauke Archidioecesis Meraukensis Keuskupan Agung Merauke

Location
- Country: Indonesia
- Ecclesiastical province: Merauke

Statistics
- Area: 90,000 km^{2} (35,000 sq mi)
- Population: Total; Catholics: (as of 2023); 300,000; 140,220 (57.4%)

Information
- Rite: Latin Rite
- Cathedral: Cathedral of St. Francis Xavier

Current leadership
- Pope: Leo XIV
- Metropolitan Archbishop: Mgr. Petrus Canisius Mandagi M.S.C.
- Vicar General: Hendrikus Kariwop M.S.C.
- Bishops emeritus: Nicolaus Adi Seputra

Map

The Archdiocese of Merauke (Latin: Merauken(sis)) is a Roman Catholic archdiocese based in the town of Merauke in Merauke Regency, South Papua Province, Indonesia. It encompasses 90,000 square kilometres (35,000 sq mi) divided into three districts: Merauke, Mappi and Boven Digoel. The current head of the archdiocese, Archbishop Petrus Canisius Mandagi was appointed on 11 November 2020 and installed on 3 January 2021.

== History ==
The apostolic prefecture of Batavia was created on 8 May 1807. On 20 September 1842, it was elevated to the apostolic vicariate of Batavia. However, on 22 December 1902, part of its territory was split off to create the apostolic prefecture of Dutch New Guinea.

This new apostolic prefecture itself became an apostolic vicariate on 20 July 1920. On 12 May 1949, it was split into the apostolic vicariate of Amboina and the apostolic prefecture of Hollandia (the city underwent several renamings before settling on Jayapura). Finally, on 24 June 1950, the vicariate was renamed the apostolic vicariate of Merauke. On 15 November 1966, it was raised to the Metropolitan Archdiocese of Merauke.

On 29 May 1969, part of its territory was designated the suffragan Diocese of Agats. The suffran Diocese of Timika was created on 19 December 2003.

== Leadership ==
Archbishops of Merauke (Roman rite):

- Archbishop Petrus Canisius Mandagi, M.S.C. (11 November 2020 – present)
- Archbishop Nicolaus Adi Seputra, M.S.C. (7 April 2004 – 28 March 2020)
- Archbishop Jacobus Duivenvoorde, M.S.C. (26 June 1972 – 30 April 2004)
- Archbishop Herman Tillemans, M.S.C. (15 November 1966 – 26 June 1972)

Bishop Herman Tillemans (later the archbishop of Merauke) was the vicar apostolic of Merauke (Roman rite) from 25 June 1950 to 15 November 1966.

== Suffragan dioceses ==
There are four suffragan dioceses: Agats, Jayapura, Manokwari–Sorong and Timika.
