= Anim languages =

Language family of New Guinea

Anim
- Fly River
- Geographic distribution: Fly River, central southern New Guinea
- Linguistic classification: Trans-New Guinea?: Anim
- Proto-language: Proto-Anim
- Subdivisions: Inland Gulf; Tirio; Boazi; Marind–Yaqai

Language codes
- Glottolog: anim1240
- Map of the Anim languages in relation to other language families on New Guinea. The Anim families Other Trans–New Guinea families Other Papuan languages Austronesian languages Uninhabited

The Anim or Fly River languages are a language family in south-central New Guinea established by Usher & Suter (2015). The names of the family derive from the Fly River and from the Proto-Anim word *anim 'people'.

== Languages ==
The 17 Anim languages belong to the following four subfamilies:

- Inland Gulf
- Tirio (Lower Fly River)
- Boazi (Lake Murray)
- Marind (Marind–Yaqai)

The moribund Abom language, previously considered a member of the Tirio family, is of uncertain classification, possibly Trans–New Guinea, but does not appear to be Anim. The extinct Karami language, attested only in a short word list and previously assigned to the Inland Gulf family, defies classification (Usher and Suter 2015).

Anim languages and respective demographic information listed by Evans (2018) are provided below.

List of Anim languages
| Language | Subgroup | Location | Population | Alternate names |
|---|---|---|---|---|
| Marind | Nuclear Marind | central Merauke Regency and southeast corner (Indonesia) | 7,000 | |
| Bian | Nuclear Marind | northeast Merauke Regency (Indonesia) | 2,900 | |
| Yaqay | Yaqay | eastern Mappi Regency (Indonesia) | 10,000 | |
| Warkay-Bipim | Yaqay | south Asmat Regency (Indonesia) | 300 | |
| Kuni-Boazi | Lake Murray (Boazi) | west Lake Murray (PNG) | 4,500 | |
| Zimakani | Lake Murray (Boazi) | southwest Lake Murray across border (PNG) | 1,500 | |
| Tirio | Tirio (Lower Fly) | south bank of lower Fly River (PNG) | 1900 | Makayam |
| Bitur | Tirio (Lower Fly) | south bank of lower Fly River (PNG) | 860 | Mutum, Paswam, Bituri |
| Adulu | Tirio (Lower Fly) | south Gogodala Rural LLG (PNG) | 220 | Aturu |
| Lewada-Dewara | Tirio (Lower Fly) | Gogodala Rural LLG (PNG) | 700 | Were |
| Baramu | Tirio (Lower Fly) | south bank of lower Fly River (PNG) | 850 | |
| Ipiko | Ipiko (Inland Gulf) | West Kikori Rural LLG (PNG) | | |

== Reconstruction ==
=== Phonemes ===
Proto-Anim
- Reconstruction of: Anim languages

Usher (2020) reconstructs the consonant inventory as follows:

| *m | *n | | |
| *p | *t | | *k |
| *mb | *nd | | *ŋg |
| *ɸ | *s | | |
| *w | *r | *j | |

Vowels are *a *e *i *o *u.

=== Pronouns ===
Proto-Anim pronouns (Usher and Suter 2015):

| | sg | pl |
|---|---|---|
| 1 | *na- | *ni- |
| 2 | *ŋga- | *ja |
| 3 | *(u)a- | *ja |

By 2020, comparison with the neighboring TNG branch Awyu–Ok had led so some revision of the reconstructions. Here are the nominative and possessive/object forms:

| | sg | pl |
|---|---|---|
| 1 | *no, *na- | *ni, *na-/*ni- |
| 2 | *ŋgo, **ŋga- | *[i/e]o, *[i/e]a- |
| 3m | *e, *e- | *i, *i- |
| 3f | *u, *u- | *i, *i- |

The demonstrative third-person forms *e-, *u-, *i- are an innovation shared with proto-Awyu–Ok, which has the same vowel ablaut in the second person as well. They reflect a gender ablaut of msg *e, fsg *u, nsg *[a/o], and pl *i, as in *anem 'man', *anum 'woman', *anim 'people', or *we 'father', *wu 'mother', *wi 'parents'.

=== Lexicon ===
Proto-Anim lexical reconstructions by Usher & Suter (2015) are:

| gloss | Proto-Anim |
|---|---|
| ‘house’ | *aɸ(a,o) |
| ‘younger sibling’ | *am(o)=e/*am=u |
| ‘laugh’ | *awend(V) |
| ‘thigh’ | *mboɸo |
| ‘breast’ | *mbumb(V) |
| ‘tree’ | *nde |
| ‘navel’ | *ndekum(u) |
| ‘sago’ | *ndou |
| ‘build a nest’ | *ewes |
| ‘bone’ | *ɸia(u) |
| ‘rain’ | *ŋg(a,o)e |
| ‘night’ | *ŋgap(o) |
| ‘eat, drink’ | *ŋg(e,a)i |
| ‘root’ | *itit(i) |
| ‘lip’ | *itup(u) |
| ‘cry’ | *iwo |
| ‘tooth’ | *kam(V) |
| ‘egg, seed’ | *kan(a,e) |
| ‘paddle’ | *kawea |
| ‘mouth, teeth’ | *maŋg(a,o)t(o) |
| ‘come’ | *mano |
| ‘speech, voice’ | *mean(V) |
| ‘two’ | *measi |
| ‘fruit, seed’ | *moko(m) |
| ‘heart’ | *muki(k) |
| ‘mosquito’ | *naŋg(a,i)t(i) |
| ‘banana’ | *napet(o) |
| ‘sleep’ | *nu |
| ‘forearm’ | *piŋgi |
| ‘stand’ | *ratinV |
| ‘hand’ | *seŋga |
| ‘tongue’ | *sas(a) |
| ‘meat, fish’ | *sawa(i) |
| ‘tail feathers’ | *sum(V) |
| ‘fire, tree’ | *tae |
| ‘wing’ | *taɸ(u) |
| ‘nape’ | *temuk(u) |
| ‘lie down’ | *tenV |

Below are selected reconstructions for Proto-Fly River (Proto-Anim) and branches by Usher (2020).

| gloss | Proto- Fly River | Proto- Inland Gulf | Proto- Lower Fly River | Proto- Lake Murray | Proto- Marind-Yaqay | Proto- Marind | Proto- Yakhai-Warkay | Proto- Yakhai |
|---|---|---|---|---|---|---|---|---|
| head | | *gia | | | | *pa | *muku | |
| hair | | | *duɾumə; *duɾum | | | | | |
| ear | | *tu; *jeja | *towap | | *kambet | *kembet, *kambet | *k[e]mbet | |
| eye | *kindV[C] | *kuɸino | *baɾid | | *kind | *kind | *kind | |
| nose | | *dasi | *miw | | | *aŋgi₂p | *s[e/a]maŋg | |
| tooth | *kam | *ta; *bese | *suwə; *kam; *su | *kam | *maŋg[e/a]t | *maŋgat | *maŋg[e/a]t | |
| tongue | *sas | *koda; *sasa | *jimə; *jim | *naseam; *sas | *inVm | *inum | *in[e/a]m | |
| leg | | *idini | | | | *tegu | | |
| louse | *n[u]m[u]ŋg | *uani | *oɾ[eae]n | *[num]uŋg | *nambun | *nahun; *mba[m/mb] | *nambun | |
| dog | | *gaso | *s[eae]; *diɾean | *gaɣo | | *ŋgat | | |
| pig | *mbasik | *maɸa | *m[i/e]nawə | *basik | *basik | *basik | *basik | |
| bird | | *ewesa | *dawod | | | *ujub | | *pet[e/a]ɣau |
| egg | *kanV | *ɸutu; *usu | *sVɣaɾə | | *mogaw; *kan[a] | *magaw | *mo[k/ɣ]a | |
| blood | | | *nauɾə | *kouk | | *do | | |
| bone | *mbai[a]ŋg; *ɸia[u] | *ɸia | *naɾak(ə); *baig | *bajag | *hia[u] | *haiau, *hiau | *hia | *ia |
| skin | | *nikopi; *ko[j]ipo | | *ŋgusum | | *ugu | | |
| breast | | *jono | *bub | *toto | | *bub | *abut | |
| tree | *nde | *de | *naukə | *tae | *de | *de | *de | |
| man | *anem | *aneme | *anem(ə) | *anem | *anem | *anem | | |
| woman | *anum | *anumu | *anum(ə) | *anum | *anum | *anum | | *sau |
| sun | | *nowumu; *siwio | *manom | *kaia | | *katane | | |
| moon | | *bubei | *manom | | | *mandou | *kam[e/o] | |
| water | | *ogo | *mau[g/k]ə | *neia, *naia | *adika | *adeka | *adika | *maⁱ |
| fire | *tae | *maɸi; *ta[j]e | *j[i]au | *tae | *tekaw | *tekaw | *teka | |
| stone | | | *didigə | | *seŋgV | *ketaɾ; *seŋga | *seŋgV | *seŋgi |
| path | | *jigei | *ewean | | | *isas | | |
| name | | *jiga | *gag | *ij | *[i/e]g[i/e]j | *igij | *[e][k/ɣ][e] | |
| eat | | | *tamu | | | *ɣawi[ɣ] | | *bae |
| one | *ija (?) | *jaigio | *ɣoɾ[e]a[u][k] | *koapo | *ija[kod] | *ijako[d]; *ijakod | | |
| two | *meas[i] | *measi | *mis | | | *inah | | *[k/ɣ]aiaɣamat |
