= Marind =

Marind may refer to:

- Marind people
- Marind languages
  - Marind language
