= Australasia =

Subregion of Oceania

Coordinates: 28°06′32″S 146°18′00″E

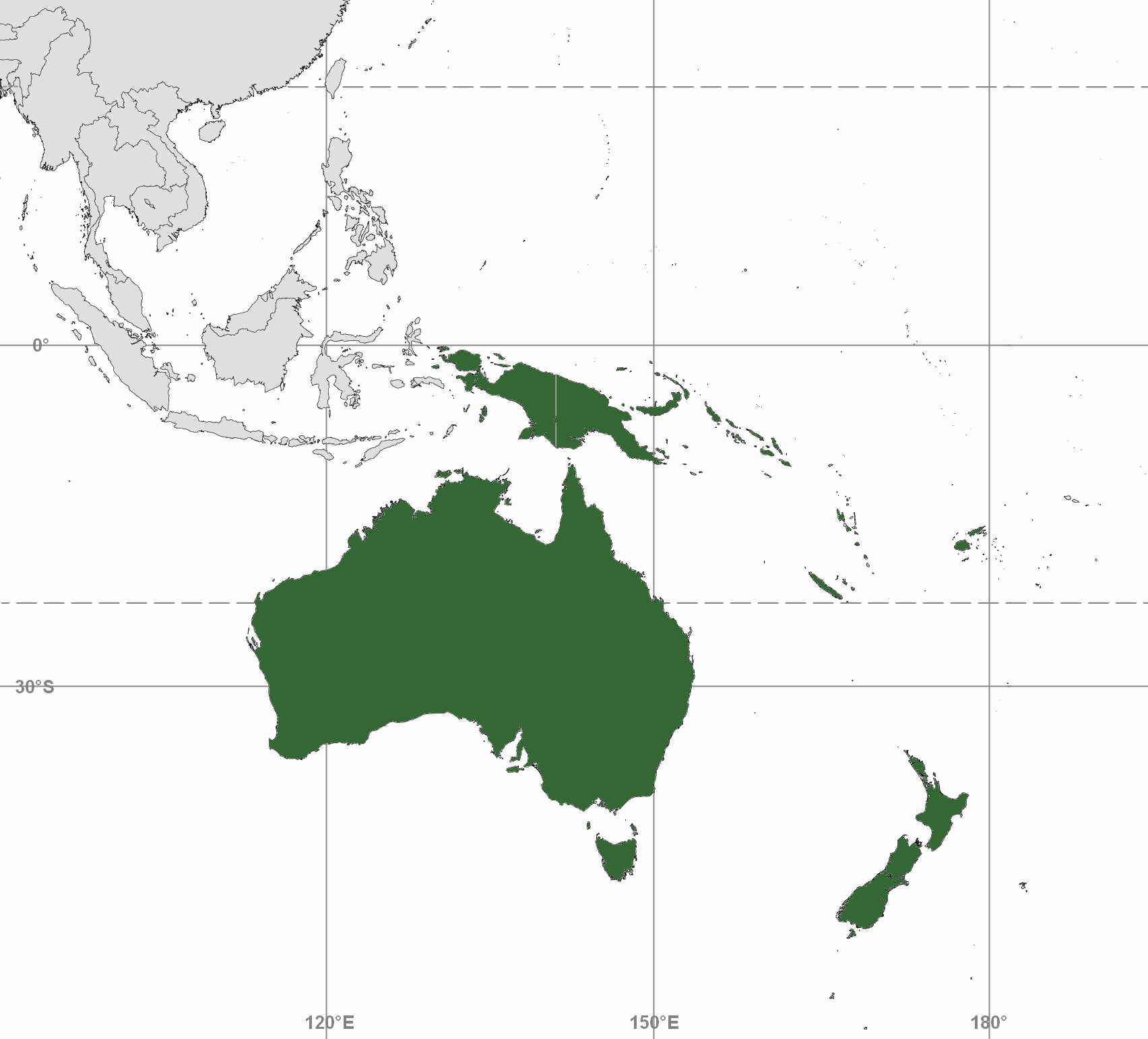
Australia's concept of Australasia, which includes Australia, New Zealand and Melanesia.

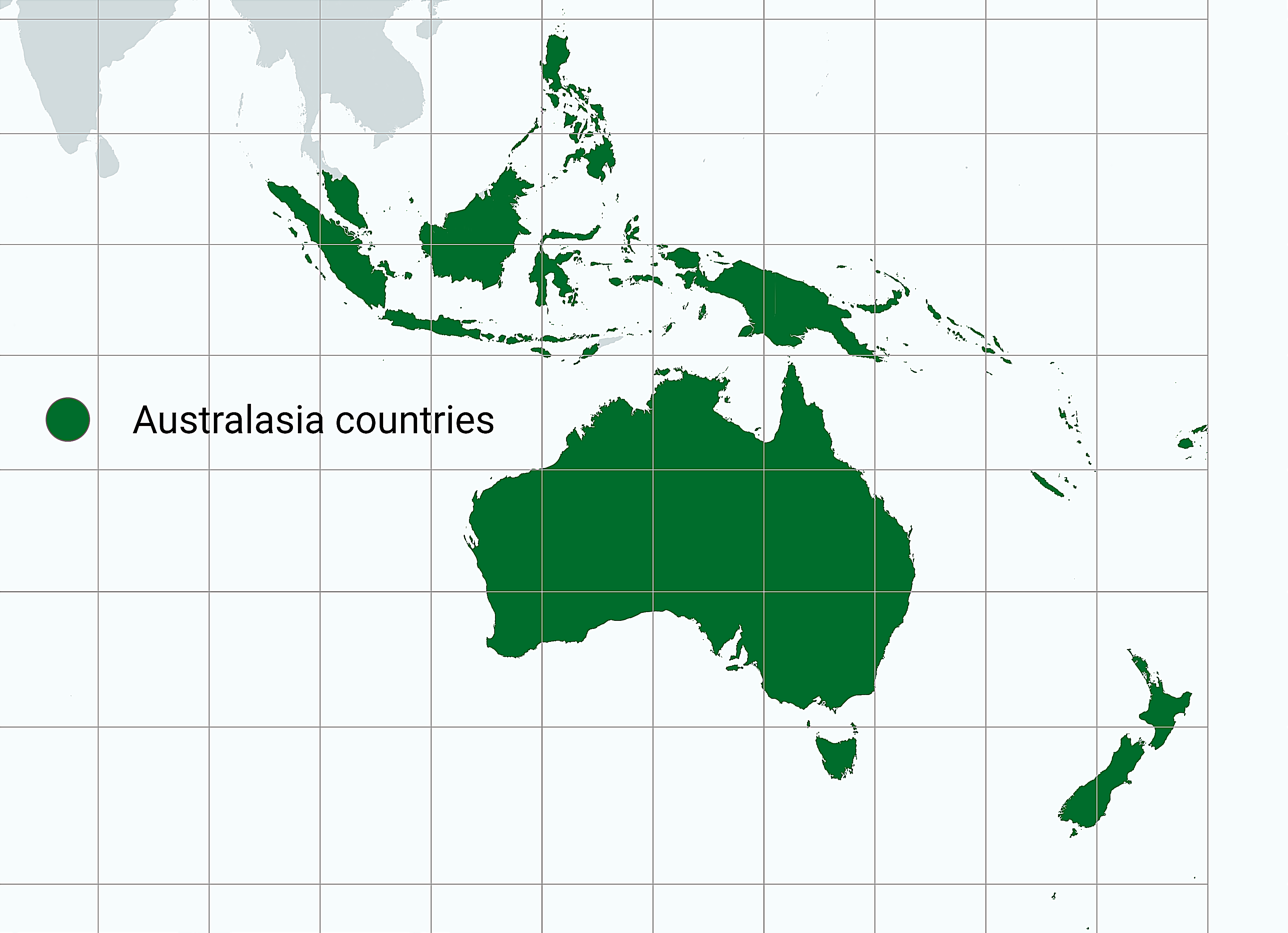
In its broadest concept, it also includes the Philippines and the Malay Peninsula.

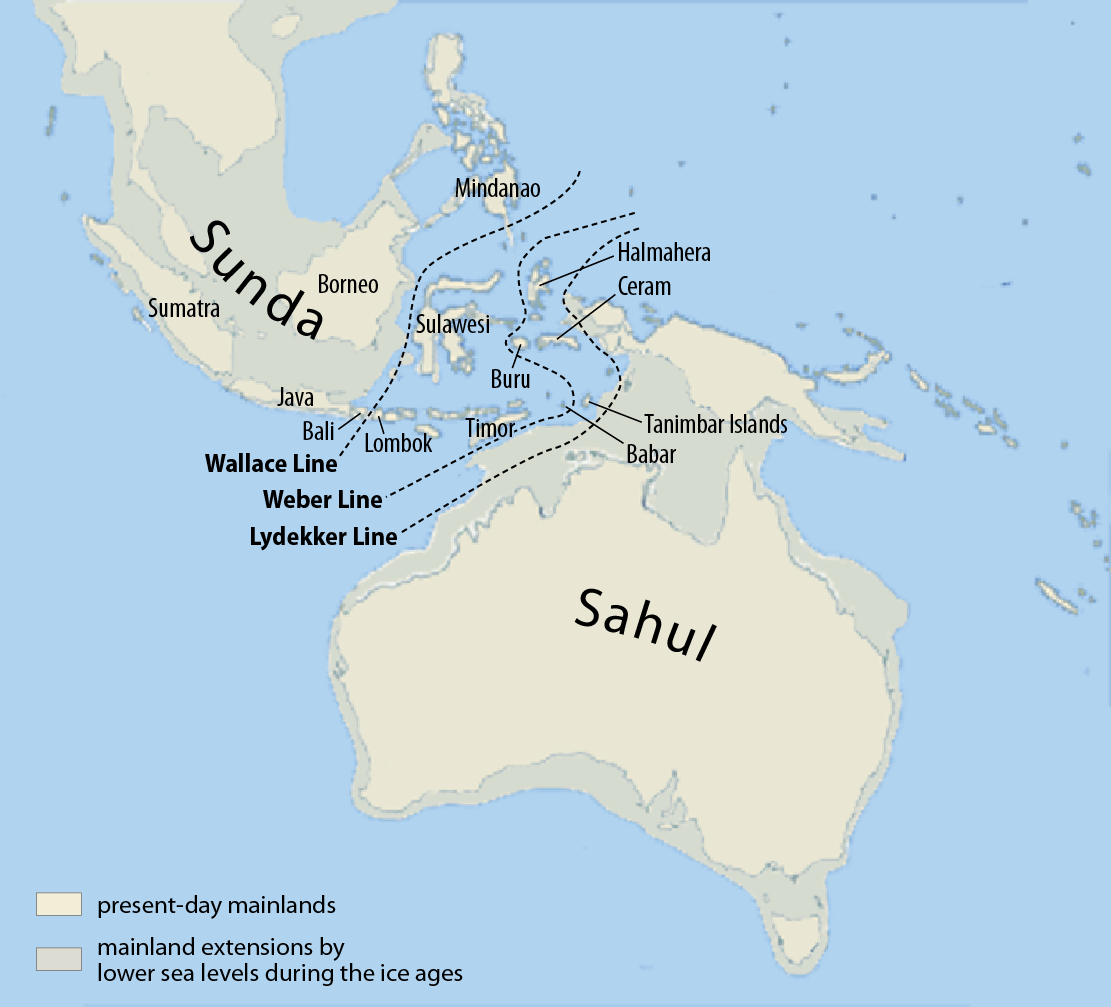
Wallacea – here between Sunda and Sahul – is often counted as belonging to the Australasian bioregion

Australasia is a geographical subregion of Oceania with ambiguous extents. The term is used in a number of different contexts, including geopolitically, physiogeographically, philologically, and ecologically, where the term covers several slightly different but related regions. Depending on the definition used, it may also include insular parts of Asia. Australasia always includes Australia and New Zealand, and often also includes New Guinea. In its broadest sense, it may include the entire Malay Archipelago (Nusantara).

== Derivation and definitions ==
Charles de Brosses coined the term (as French Australasie) in Histoire des navigations aux terres australes (1756). He derived it from the Latin for "south of Asia" and differentiated the area from Polynesia (to the east) and the southeast Pacific (Magellanica).

In the late 19th century, the term Australasia was used in reference to the "Australasian colonies". In this sense it related specifically to the British colonies south of Asia: New South Wales, Queensland, South Australia, Tasmania, Western Australia, Victoria (i.e., the Australian colonies) and New Zealand.

Australasia found continued geopolitical attention in the early 20th century. Historian Hansong Li finds that against the backdrop of British colonialism, German geopoliticians considered "Australasia" as a counterweight to the former German South Sea Edge (Südseerand), both of which form the "Indo-Pacific" region.

The New Zealand Oxford Dictionary gives two meanings of "Australasia". One, especially in Australian use, is "Australia, New Zealand, New Guinea, and the neighbouring islands of the Pacific". The other, especially in New Zealand use, is just Australia and New Zealand. Two Merriam-Webster dictionaries online (Collegiate and Unabridged) define Australasia as "Australia, New Zealand, and Melanesia". The American Heritage Dictionary online recognizes two senses in use: one more precise and the other broader, loosely covering all of Oceania.

New Guinea is also considered part of Melanesia as the indigenous population of the area is ethnically Melanesian, while New Zealand is considered part of Polynesia as the native Maori population is ethnically Polynesian.

== Demographics ==
Flag	Name of region, followed by countries	Area (km^{2})	Population (2021)	Population density (per km^{2})	Capital	ISO 3166-1	ISO 3166-2:ID
(Ashmore and Cartier Islands)	Ashmore and Cartier Islands (Australia)	199	—N/a				
(Australia)	Australia	7,686,850	25,921,089	3.1	Canberra	AU	—N/a
(Central Papua)	Central Papua (Indonesia)	61,073	—N/a		Wanggar	—N/a	PT
(Christmas Island)	Christmas Island (Australia)	135	1,692	12.5	Flying Fish Cove	CX	—N/a
(Cocos (Keeling) Islands)	Cocos (Keeling) Islands (Australia)	14	593	42.4	West Island	CC	—N/a
(Coral Sea Islands)	Coral Sea Islands (Australia)	10	4	0.4	—N/a		
(Highland Papua)	Highland Papua (Indonesia)	51,213	—N/a		Jayawijaya	—N/a	PE
(New Zealand)	New Zealand	268,680	5,129,727	17.3	Wellington	NZ	—N/a
(Norfolk Island)	Norfolk Island (Australia)	35	2,302	65.8	Kingston	NF	—N/a
(Papua (province))	Papua (Indonesia)	82,681	—N/a		Jayapura	—N/a	PA
(Papua New Guinea)	Papua New Guinea	462,840	9,949,437	22	Port Moresby	PG	—N/a
(South Papua)	South Papua (Indonesia)	117,849	—N/a		Salor	—N/a	PS
(Southwest Papua)	Southwest Papua (Indonesia)	39,123	—N/a		Sorong	—N/a	PD
(West Papua (province))	West Papua (Indonesia)	60,275	—N/a		Manokwari	—N/a	PB
Australasia (total)		8,418,763	42,836,966	5.1	—N/a		

== See also ==
- Asia-Pacific
- Australasian realm
- Australasia at the Olympics
- Austral-Asia Cup
- Down Under
- Trans-Tasman
- Zealandia
- Micronesia
