= Marind language =

Trans–New Guinea language spoken in Indonesia

Marind
- Native to: Indonesia
- Region: Malind District, Merauke Regency, South Papua
- Ethnicity: Marind
- Native speakers: (10,000 cited 1987–2002)
- Language family: Anim: Marind-Boazi-Yaqai; Marindic; Marind

Language codes
- ISO 639-3: Either: mrz – Southeast bpv – Northwest
- Glottolog: nucl1621

Marind is a Papuan language spoken in Malind District, Merauke Regency, Indonesia by over ten thousand people. Dialects are Southeast Marind, Gawir, Holifoersch, and Tugeri. Bian Marind (Northwest Marind), also known as Boven-Mbian, is divergent enough to not be mutually intelligible, and has been assigned a separate ISO code.

Marind separates the Trans-Fly–Bulaka River languages, which would otherwise occupy a nearly continuous stretch of southern New Guinea.

== Phonology ==
=== Consonants ===
		Labial	Alveolar	Palatal	Velar	Glottal
Nasal		m	n			
Plosive	voiceless	p	t		k	
Plosive	voiced	b	d		ɡ	
Plosive	prenasal	ᵐb	ⁿd		ᵑɡ	
Fricative			s		ɣ	h
Approximant	voiced	w	l	j		
Approximant	preaspirated	ʰw		ʰj		

- Pre-aspirated glides /ʰw, ʰj/ are also heard as voiceless glides [w̥, j̊].

=== Vowels ===
	Front	Central	Back
High	i		u
Mid	e	(ɐ)	o
Low		a	

- There is also a marginal vowel sound /ɐ/.

== Grammar ==
=== Nouns and Pronouns ===
Coastal Marind nouns are morphologically quite simple, lacking markers of case or number. There are four noun classes, class I for male humans, class II for female humans and animals, and classes III and IV for inanimates. There is widespread syncretism in exponents of noun class marking between class IV and plurals of classes I and II, which could lead to an analysis of gender IV as a class of pluralia tantum. Words describing properties, akin to adjectives, modify nouns in a compound construction rather than forming an adjectival phrase. Compounds can also be used to modify nouns with other nouns, or desentential verb stems. The standard first person pronouns and indexing markers do not distinguish singular from plural; on verbs, a role neutral first person plural marker is used in addition to the standard indexing morphemes if a plural first person is an argument, no matter its semantic or grammatical role. Where this marker cannot be used to disambiguate, the associative plural marker may follow the first person pronoun to force a plural interpretation. Coastal Marind uses demonstratives as third person pronouns.

=== The Verb ===
Coastal Marind has very complex verb morphology, with actors, as well as dative and genitive arguments being indexed in a prefixal complex that precedes the lexical verb stem. The prefixal complex and verb stem share only one stress, on the final syllable of the prefixal complex, though they are separate phonological words, as sound changes which take place word internally do not occur at their border. This complex along with markers on the verb stem itself also marks various tense, aspect, and mood categories, illocution, valency changing devices, pluractionality, and some adverbial categories, such as repetition or return to a previous state, akin to English "again", and a marker to indicate that a verb of position or motion takes place on top of a surface other than the ground. Many verb stems undergo alternations marking the person, number, and noun class of the undergoer argument, which can be realised as a prefix, suffix, or an infix, or in some cases, irregular or suppletive forms. The prefixal complex also displays a marker for the role of a constituent placed in the immediately preverbal focus slot, a system which works similarly to Austronesian alignment. This focus system works according to Nominative/Accusative Alignment, with the sole argument of an intransitive verb treated the same as the more agentive argument of a transitive verb, while the other role markers in the prefixal complex and verb stem operate on a more semantic basis, with verbs like "fall" indexing their sole argument as an undergoer, and taking invariant third person singular agent marking. Verbs are negated by a preverbal marker "mbya", which within noun phrases has the function of marking collectivity, "all". It is likely this marker was used alongside a negative marker in the prefixal complex to reinforce the negative meaning, as in English "not verb at all", but over time replaced the original negative marker, an example of Jespersen's cycle. Other related languages display a prefixal negative marker, which in Coastal Marind only remains as a component of the prohibitive (negative imperative) marker.

=== The Auxiliary construction ===
Verb stems may also be moved out of their position following the prefixal complex, and replaced by a dummy auxiliary, in order to be modified by elements that cannot otherwise modify verbs in adverbial function, such as a property word meaning "bad", which can be compounded with verb stems in this construction to mean "verb badly/wrongly". Notably, this is also used to express "only" on verbs, as in "We only cooked the food (but didn't eat it.)", as the expression of "only" on arguments requires the argument to be place pre-verbal focus slot, and an "only" marker used in the prefixal complex. With the auxiliary, the verb stem is placed in this position.

=== Basic Clause Structure ===
Clausal word order is more constrained by pragmatic constraints than syntactic ones, in particular the immediately preverbal position is used to mark focus, though there is a preference towards verb final word order. The language is pro-drop, with arguments being readily omitted from clauses if they can be assumed from context.

=== Complex Clauses ===
Relationships between clauses are often quite unspecified, with subordinate clauses appearing at the periphery of main clauses rather than embedded within them, resembling the "adjoined relative clauses" described in some Australian languages like Warlpiri, and being translatable into English as either relative, complement, or adverbial clauses depending on context. The direct speech construction is extended to cover functions beyond just quoting, also being used to express desire, thoughts, and purpose.
