= Bipim language =

Language

Bipim
- Warkay-Bipim
- Native to: Indonesia
- Region: South Papua
- Native speakers: (300 cited 1993)
- Language family: Trans–New Guinea: Fly River (Anim); Marind–Yaqai; Yaqay; Bipim

Language codes
- ISO 639-3: bgv
- Glottolog: wark1247
- ELP: Warkay-Bipim

Bipim, or Warkay-Bipim, is a Papuan language spoken in Bipim Village on the banks of Kampung River in Astj District and in Warkai Village, Betcbamu District of Asmat Regency, South Papua, Indonesia.
