= Marind–Yaqai languages =

Family of Papuan languages

Marind–Yaqai
- Marind
- Geographic distribution: South Papua
- Ethnicity: Marind people
- Linguistic classification: Trans–New Guinea: Anim (Fly River); Marind–Yaqai
- Subdivisions: Marind; Yaqay

Language codes
- Glottolog: mari1437
- Map: The Marind–Yaqai languages of New Guinea The Marind and Yaqai languages Other Trans–New Guinea languages Other Papuan languages Austronesian languages Uninhabited

The Marind–Yaqai (Marind–Yakhai) languages are a well established language family of Papuan languages, spoken by the Marind-anim. They form part of the Trans–New Guinea languages in the classifications of Stephen Wurm and Malcolm Ross, and were established as part of the Anim branch of TNG by Timothy Usher.

== Languages ==
The languages are:

- Marind–Yaqai
  - Marind
    - Warkay-Bipim
    - Yaqay

== Proto-language ==
=== Phonemes ===
Usher (2020) reconstructs the consonant inventory as follows:

*m	*n		
*p	*t		*k
*b	*d		*g
*mb	*nd		*ŋg
	*s		*h
*w	*ɾ	*j	*ɣ

Vowels are *a *e *i *o *u.

=== Pronouns ===
The pronouns are:

	sg	pl
1	*nok	?
2	*oɣ	*eoɣ
3m	*anep	*anip
3f	*anup	*anip

== Classification ==
The Marind languages were partially identified by Sidney Herbert Ray and JHP Murray in 1918; the family was filled out by JHMC Boelaars in 1950. It was incorporated into Trans–New Guinea by Stephen Wurm in 1975.

The Boazi languages were formerly classified as Marind.

== Evolution ==
Marind reflexes of proto-Trans-New Guinea (pTNG) etyma:

- kase ‘saliva’ < pTNG *kasipa ‘spit’
- maŋgat ‘mouth’ < *maŋgat[a]
- mudu-meŋ ‘belly’ < *mundu-maŋgV ‘heart’
- mokom ‘fruit, seed’ < *maŋgV
- saŋga ‘hand, finger, arm’ < *sa(ŋg,k)(a,i)l ‘hand, claw’
- sâ ‘sand’ < *sa(ŋg,k)asiŋ
- de ‘tree’ < *inda
- iwar ‘wind’ < *kumbutu
- kuyu ‘cassowary’ < *ku(y)a

== See also ==
- Marind people
