= Boazi languages =

Boazi
- Lake Murray
- Geographic distribution: Lake Murray, New Guinea
- Linguistic classification: Trans–New Guinea: Anim (Fly River); Boazi
- Subdivisions: Boazi (Kuni); Zimakani

Language codes
- Glottolog: boaz1244
- Map: The Boazi languages of New Guinea The Boazi languages Other Trans–New Guinea languages Other Papuan languages Austronesian languages Uninhabited

The Boazi languages, also known as the Lake Murray languages, are a pair of languages in the Trans–New Guinea family, spoken near Lake Murray (Papua New Guinea). They were previously classified in the Marind branch.

The languages are Kuni-Boazi and Zimakani.

== Phonemes ==
Usher (2020) reconstructs the consonant inventory as follows:

*m	*n		
*p	*t		*k
[*b]	[*d]		*g
*mb	*nd		*ŋg
*f	*s		
*w		*j	*ɣ

Vowels are *a *e *i *o *u.

== Pronouns ==
The pronouns are:

	sg	pl
1	*no(k)	*ni(k)
2	*ɣo(k)	*jo(k)
3m	*e-	*i-
3f	*u-	*i-
