= Boazi language =

Papuan language of Papua New Guinea

Boazi
- Kuni
- Region: Papua New Guinea
- Native speakers: 4,500 (2007)
- Language family: Anim: Marind-Boazi-Yaqai; Kuni-Boazi; Boazi

Language codes
- ISO 639-3: kvg
- Glottolog: kuni1265

Boazi (Bwadji), also known as Kuni after one of its dialects, is a Papuan language spoken in the Western Province of Papua New Guinea by the Bwadji people in the vicinity of Lake Murray and is written using the Latin script, with ⟨æ⟩ for /ɛ/, ⟨ø⟩ for /ʌ/, and ⟨꞉⟩ for (relatively infrequent) vowel length. Some recordings of songs and stories have been made in this language.

== Phonology ==
Consonants
		Labial	Alveolar	Velar	Uvular
Plosive	voiceless	p	t	k	q
Plosive	prenasal	ᵐb	ⁿd	ᵑɡ	ᶰq
Plosive	voiced	b	d	ɡ	
Fricative	voiceless	f	s	x	
Fricative	voiced	v	z	ɣ	
Nasal		m	n		
Liquid			l ~ ɾ		

- /l/ can fluctuate as sounds [l ~ d ~ ɾ]. Sounds [ɾ] and [d] are more common in word-medial positions.
- /q/ may also be heard as a retracted velar plosive [k̠] in free variation.
- /ᶰq/ can also be heard as a prenasal velar fricative [ᵑɣ] in free variation.
- Sounds /s, z/ tend to become alveolo-palatal [ɕ, ʑ] when in the environment of a high vowel.
- Sounds /v, z/ tend to be devoiced [v̥, z̥] in word-final positions.
- /f/ may be heard in free fluctuation with [θ] within the environment of a high vowel.

Vowels
	Front	Central	Back
High	i		u
High-mid	e		o
Low-mid	ɛ		ʌ
Low		a	
