= Yaqay language =

Fly River language spoken in Indonesia

Yaqay
- Native to: Indonesia
- Region: South Papua
- Native speakers: (10,000 cited 1987)
- Language family: Trans–New Guinea: Fly River (Anim); Marind–Yaqai; Yaqay languages; Yaqay

Language codes
- ISO 639-3: jaq
- Glottolog: yaqa1246

Yaqay (Yakhai, Yaqai, Jakai, Jaqai) is a Papuan language spoken in Indonesia by over 10,000 people. It is also called Mapi or Sohur; dialects are Oba-Miwamon, Nambiomon-Mabur, Bapai.

According to Ethnologue, Yaqay is spoken along the south coast of Mappi Regency, along the Obaa River north to the Gandaimu area.

== Phonology ==
The following is the phonology of Yaqay, as defined in Fonologi Bahasa Yakhai.

=== Consonants ===
Consonants
		Labial	Dental / Alveolar	Postalveolar / Palatal	Velar	Glottal
Nasal		m ⟨m⟩	n ⟨n⟩		(ŋ ⟨ngg⟩?)	
Plosive	voiceless	p ⟨p⟩	t̪ ⟨t⟩		k ⟨k⟩	ʔ ⟨-k⟩
Plosive	voiced	b ⟨b⟩	d̪ ⟨d⟩	d͡ʒ ⟨j⟩	gʱ ⟨gh⟩	h ⟨h⟩
Fricative		f ⟨f⟩			x ⟨kh⟩	h ⟨h⟩
Approximant		w ⟨w⟩	r ⟨r⟩	j ⟨y⟩		

- ⟨t⟩ and ⟨d⟩ are both dental consonants, while ⟨n⟩ and ⟨r⟩ are alveolar consonants.
- ⟨j⟩ is a postalveolar consonant while ⟨y⟩ is palatal.
- /ŋ/ seems to be an allophone of /n/ found before velar consonants, like in the word yanggo /jaŋgo/ (it is unclear whether the sequence nng is pronounced /ŋg/, /ŋgʱ/, or just /ŋ/, but it seems to most likely be /ŋg/).
- The letter 'k' is only found at the beginning of words or at the end of syllables. At the beginning of a word, it's pronounced like /k/ (or /x/, see later notes), while at the end of syllables, it's pronounced /ʔ/, for example, in the word kerak /keraʔ/, meaning 'walking'.
- /x/, represented by kh, is pronounced like /k/ in some words, for example, khayafo /kajafo/, meaning 'spear'.
- /k/ is pronounced like /x/ in some words, for example, kah /xah/, meaning 'smelling'.
- The original source makes it unclear whether /h/ is the voiceless glottal fricatives [h] or a voiced glottal stop [ʡ], but it is most likely the voiceless glottal fricative [h].

==== Consonant distribution ====
Consonant	Beginning	Center	End
/m/	Y	Y	Y
/n/	Y	Y	Y
/p/	Y	N	N
/t/	Y	Y	N
/k/	Y	N	N
/ʔ/	N	Y	Y
/b/	Y	Y	Y
/d/	Y	Y	Y
/d͡ʒ/	N	Y	N
/gʱ/	N	Y	N
/f/	Y	Y	Y
/x/	Y	N	N
/h/	Y	Y	Y
/w/	Y	Y	N
/r/	Y	Y	Y
/j/	Y	Y	N

- 'Y' means that the consonant on the left of the row occurs in the word position at the top of the column. For instance, this section of the table:

Consonant	Beginning	Center	End
/t/	Y	Y	N

- means that the consonant /t/ can be found at the beginning and center of a word, but not at the end of one.

=== Vowels ===
	Front	Central	Back	
	Front	Central	Unrounded	Rounded
Close	i ⟨i⟩			u ⟨u⟩
Close mid	e ⟨e⟩		(ɤ)	o ⟨o⟩
Open mid	(ɛ)			
Open		a ⟨a⟩		

- /ɛ/ and /ɤ/ are sometimes considered to be the same phoneme as /e/ and /o/ respectively, while others consider them as separate phonemes that are in free variation.

==== Vowel distribution ====
Vowel	Beginning	Center	End
/a/	Y	N	N
/i/	Y	N	N
/u/	N	N	Y
/e/	Y	N	N
/o/	N	N	Y

- A pattern can be seen here wherein front vowels /a/, /i/, and /e/ can all only occur at the beginning of syllables, while the back vowels /u/ and /o/ can only occur at the ends of syllables.

=== Syllable structure ===
The syllable structure is not explicitly stated, but it appears to be:
Maximum syllable structure: CVNC, as in the word, xobandede, meaning 'squat'.
Minimum syllable structure: CV, as in the word, xa, meaning, 'hole'.
