= Zimakani language =

Boazi language spoken in Papua New Guinea

Zimakani
- Region: Papua New Guinea
- Native speakers: (1,500 cited 1990)
- Language family: Trans–New Guinea: Fly River (Anim); Boazi; Zimakani

Language codes
- ISO 639-3: zik
- Glottolog: zima1244

Zimakani is a Papuan language spoken in Papua New Guinea by approximately 1,500 people.

== Bibliography ==
The Unevangelized Fields Mission has texts (gospel tracts) of Zimakani.

- Unevangelized Fields Mission. 1956. Jesu’ba Woituwoituda. Unevangelized Fields Mission.
- Unevangelized Fields Mission. 1966. John’ba Lagitada Magata. Unevangelized Fields Mission.
