= Salor Indah, Kurik, Merauke =

Capital district of South Papua, Indonesia

Salor
- Location in South Papua Location in Indonesia
- Coordinates: 8°16′45″S 140°21′45″E
- Country: Indonesia
- Province: South Papua
- Regency: Merauke Regency
- District: Kurik District
- Elevation: 1 m (3.3 ft)
- Time zone: UTC+9 (Eastern Indonesia Time)
- Postal code: 99646

Salor Indah or Salor is a kampung (village) in Kurik District, Merauke Regency, South Papua, Indonesia. It is being developed as Kota Terpadu Mandiri (self-contained integrated city/town). The town of Salor will also be the administrative centre of South Papua Province.
