= Marind people =

Indigenous ethnic group of New Guinea

Marind
Marind-Anim
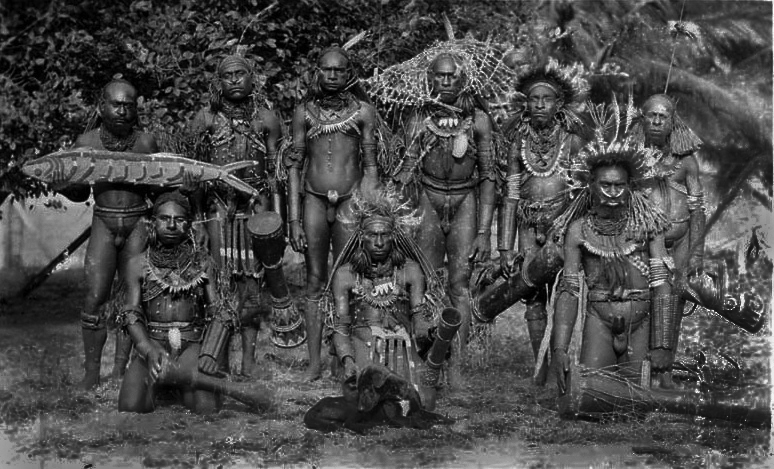
- Marind-Anim men dressed for ceremony, south coast Dutch New Guinea. c. 1920s.

Total population
- 37,558 (2010)

Regions with significant populations
- Indonesia (South Papua)

Languages
- Marind family within the Trans–New Guinea phylum of Papuan languages, Indonesian language

Religion
- Christianity (predominantly), indigenous beliefs, and Islam

Related ethnic groups
- Indigenous Papuan peoples of Western New Guinea and Papua New Guinea, other Melanesians

The Marind or Marind-Anim are an ethnic group of New Guinea, residing in the province of South Papua, Indonesia.

== Geography ==
The Marind-anim live in South Papua, Indonesia. They occupy a vast territory, which is situated on either side of the Bian River, from about 20 miles to the east of Merauke, up to the mouth of the Moeli River in the west (between Frederik Hendrik Island and the mainland; east of Yos Sudarso Island, mainly west of the Maro River (a small area goes beyond the Maro at its lower part, including Merauke).

A map showing New Guinea language groups. The Marind-speaking area is highlighted in red.

== Topography ==
The territory of the Marind tribe consists of a low-lying, deposited coastal area. This area is for the most part flooded in the wet season. The hinterland, which is situated somewhat higher, is intersected by a great number of rivers. Originally, either sago or coconut palm trees were planted, though stretches of bamboo could also be found.

== Culture ==
Mostly during the 20th century, Marind culture underwent major changes. The Dutch colonial administration forbade headhunting and ritual homosexuality, and also the rites in which many men had intercourse with one woman. These rituals accelerated the spread of the sexually transmitted diseases, in particular, granuloma inguinale (donovanosis) which erupted in a major epidemic from 1912 onwards. By this time the Marind had already experienced a marked reduction of birth rates, mainly attributable to earlier introduction of gonorrhoea to the Pacific region.

According to anthropologist Robert Edgerton the Marind-anim people believed: “Semen was essential to human growth and development. They also married quite young, and to assure the bride’s fertility she has to be filled with semen. On her wedding night, therefore, as many as ten members of her husband’s lineage had sexual intercourse with the bride, and if there were more men than this in the lineage, they had intercourse with her the following night…A similar ritual was repeated at various intervals throughout a woman’s life”

Thanks to the efforts of the Missionary of the Sacred Heart, Petrus Vertenten, the Dutch government was alerted about the critical situation of the Marind, who due to the spread of the disease and their own particular practices were now risking extinction.

Christian missions and the introduction of schools to assimilate the people to western culture also resulted in major changes in Marind culture.

Jan van Baal (1909-1992), a Dutch social anthropologist who worked among the Marind, wrote in the early 1980s that traditional Marind culture was gone.

The Marind languages form a small family of the Trans–New Guinea language phylum.

== Traditional culture ==
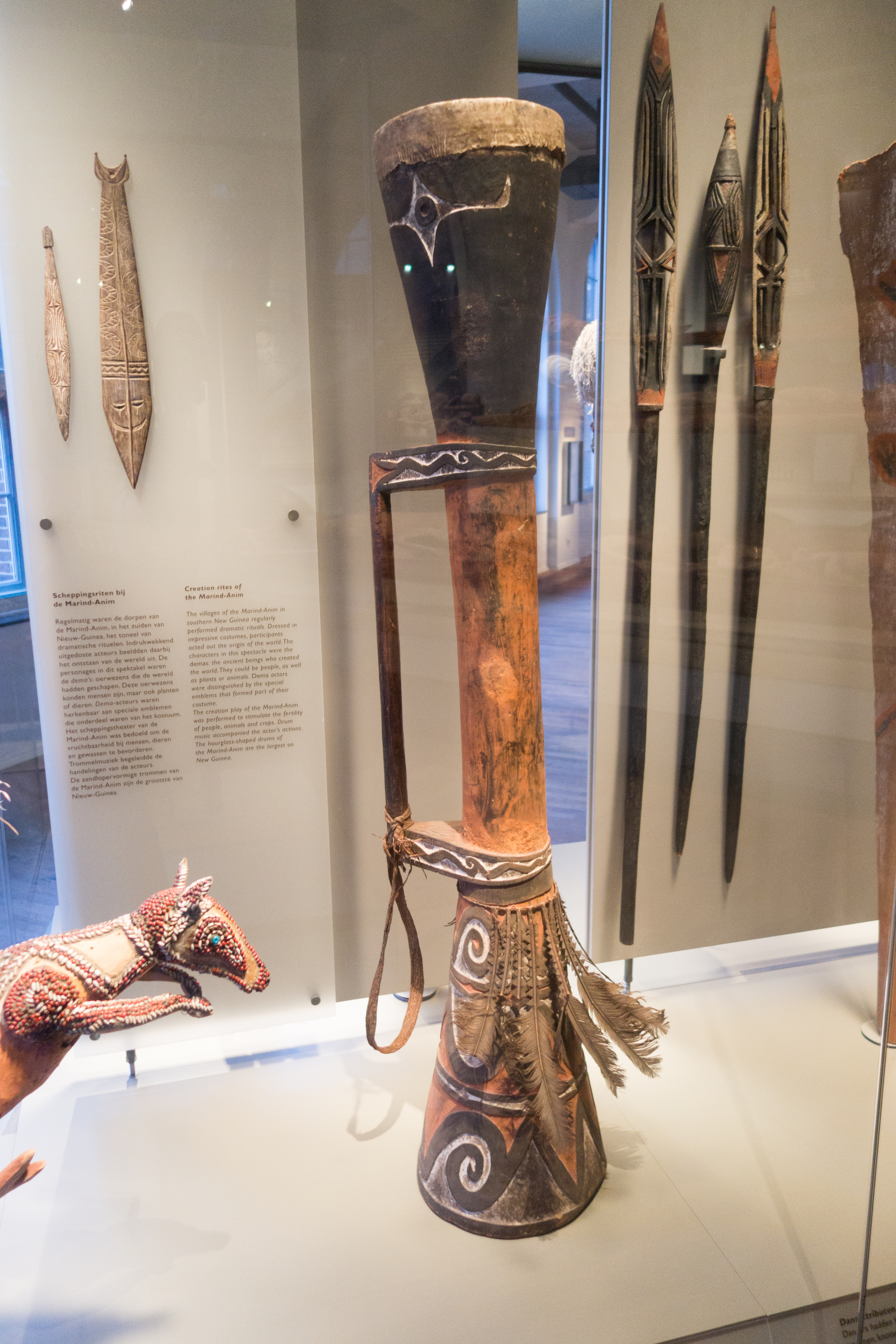
Tifa (Kandara) drum of the Marind-Anim people.

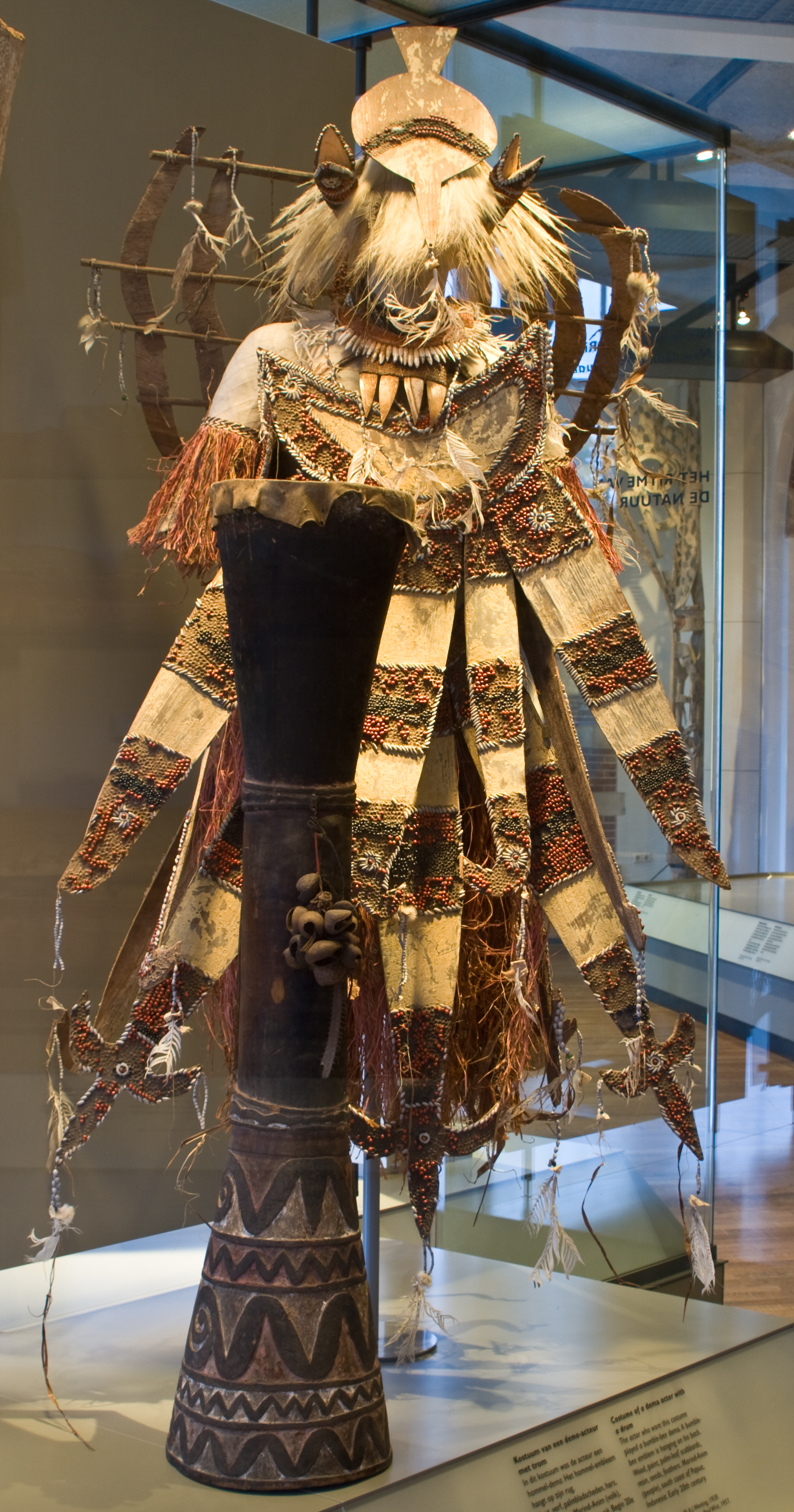
Tifa (Kandara) drum and Dema costume

Papua ceremonial drums and Dema costume of the Marind-Anim people. The drum would be used to accompany the action of the Dema actors, who were dressed as Demas, the "ancient beings who created the world" (Caption from text, left photo).

Traditionally, the social structure of the Marind was characterised by a clan system. The Marind tribe was also divided into two halves, called moities, each consisting of several patrilineal clans, called boans. The boans were further divided into subclans.

People lived spread out in several extended families. Such an extended family derived its origin from a mythological ancestor. Ancestor veneration had a characteristic form here: these mythological ancestors were demon-like figures, they featured in myths, and acted as culture heroes, arranging the ancient world to its then recent state, introducing plants, animals, cultural goods. They often had the form of plants or animals; there was a kind of totemism, but it was not accompanied by a regular food taboo of the respective animal or plant. Totems could appear both in artefacts and myths.

The word for such an ancestral spirit being is dema in the Marind languages. The material similarity of this word to “demon” is incidental. Each extended family keeps and transfers the tradition. It is especially the chore of the big men of the respective family. The influence of these big men does not go beyond their extended family.

In the past, the Marind were famous for their headhunting, which was always aimed at other tribes. This was rooted in their belief system and linked to the name-giving of the newborn. The skull was believed to contain a mana-like force.

From the 1870s to around 1910, the Boigu, Dauan and Saibai people, along with neighbouring Papuan peoples, were being harassed by thugeral "warriors" from the Marind-anim. In literature dealing with the period, these people are generally termed 'Tuger' or 'Tugeri'.

The Marind-anim are also notable for their sexual culture. Ritual intercourse (otiv-bombari) with women would take place on the day of a girl's wedding, when after the ceremony she would have sex with her new partner's male kin before having sex with her husband. This ritualistic intercourse would take place during other times as well, such as after the woman has given birth. The Marind-anim were also famous for their form of ritualized homosexuality.

Marind culture was researched by several ethnologists and missionaries. For example, the Swiss Paul Wirz, the German Hans Nevermann, and the Dutch cultural anthropologist Jan van Baal, who was the Governor of Netherlands New Guinea from 1953 until 1958.

The Marind languages form a small family of the Trans–New Guinea language phylum.

== See also ==
- Asmat people
- Digging stick
- Dugout (boat)
- Hourglass drum
- Indigenous people of New Guinea
- Papuan mythology
- Secret society
- Swamp
