= Lake Murray (Papua New Guinea) =

Largest lake in Papua New Guinea

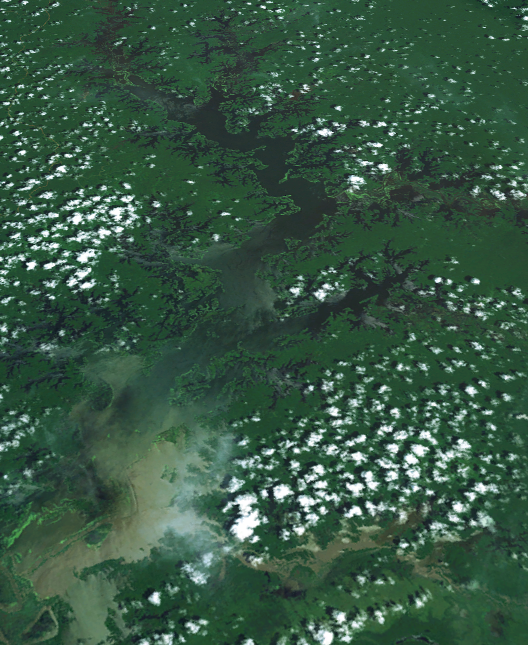
- Landsat image

- Location within Papua New Guinea
- Interactive map of Lake Murray
- Location: Western Province
- Coordinates: 7°S 141.5°E
- Primary inflows: June, Boi, Bwe, Kaim, Mamboi Rivers
- Primary outflows: Herbert River → Strickland River → Fly River → Gulf of Papua
- Basin countries: Papua New Guinea
- Max. length: 63 km (39 mi)
- Max. width: 18 km (11 mi)
- Surface area: 647 km^{2} (250 sq mi)
- Max. depth: 10 m (33 ft)
- Shore length^{1}: 2,038 km (1,266 mi)
- Surface elevation: 59 m (194 ft)
- Settlements: Lake Murray
- ^{1} Shore length is not a well-defined measure.

Lake Murray is the largest lake in Papua New Guinea. It is located in Lake Murray Rural LLG, Middle Fly District, Western Province at 7°S 141.5°E, which covers approximately 647 km^{2} and in the wet season increases to five times the size. It has a highly convoluted shoreline more than 2000 km long. The lake has been a source of nourishment for many of the local peoples. Freshwater sawfish have been caught in its shallow waters to feed the crocodiles in a farming operation.

Indigenous tribes of around 5000 people own the lake and the surrounding one million hectares of forest.

Lake Murray is known for a large population of peacock bass that were introduced by Indian merchants.

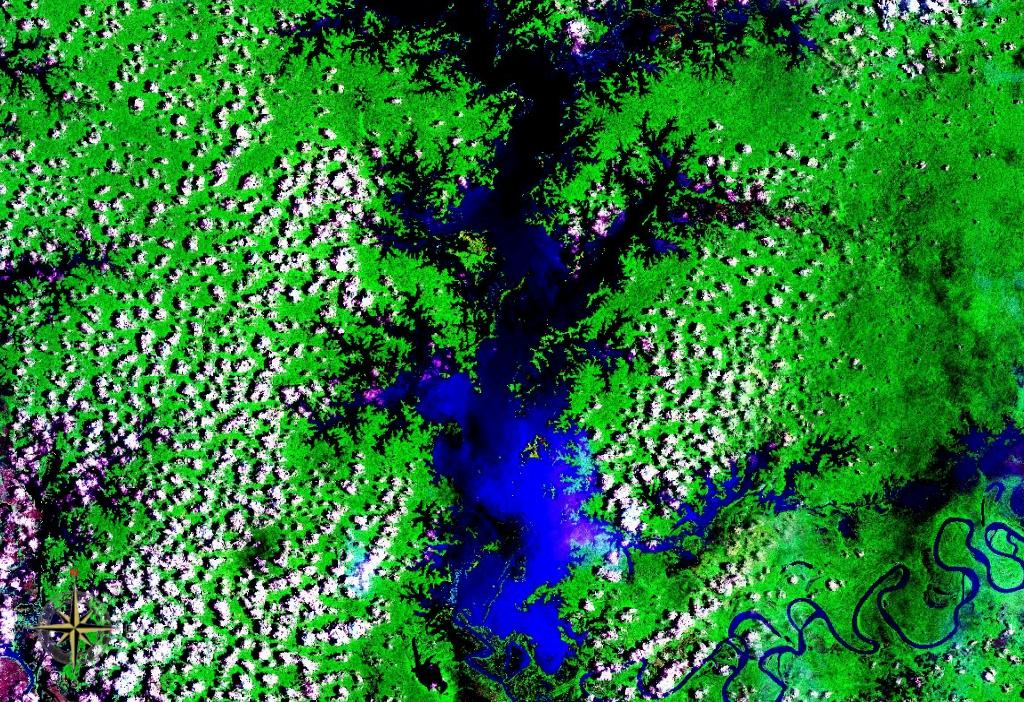
From space (false color)

== History ==
The Lake Murray basin has long been inhabited by approximately 4000 Boazi- and Zimakani-speaking peoples who build their villages on the narrow sand ridges and islands that rise above the surrounding swamps.

The first recorded European visit was by the Italian naturalist Luigi d'Albertis, who ascended the Fly River in 1876 during a Royal Geographical Society expedition.

A government patrol led by Resident Magistrate G. H. Massey-Baker and Patrol Officer D. Burrows reached the lake in August 1913 and named it Lake Murray after Lieutenant-Governor Sir Hubert Murray. Murray himself visited the site the following year.

Sporadic contact continued until the Unevangelized Fields Mission opened a station at Kaviananga near Everill Junction around the start of the Second World War, relocating to Pangoa in Lake Murray in 1947. The Administration established a patrol post on the northern shore soon afterwards.

A permanent government station was laid out in 1960 as part of a Western District development programme that promoted crocodile harvesting, trial rubber plots, and the creation of the Lake Murray Co-operative Society to market local produce.

== Illegal logging ==
In 2003, logging company Concord Pacific was forced out of the area by Greenpeace and other NGO's. 100,000 hectares of ancient forest was degraded by the logging along the Kiunga-Aiambak road.

== Greenpeace Global Forest Rescue Station (GFRS) ==
Lake Murray was the site of a Greenpeace Australia Pacific Global Forest Rescue Station. Forty volunteers from 25 countries worked with the local Kuni, Begwa and Pari tribes to identify and mark land ownership. The boundary marking was the precursor to a community based eco-forestry project. Ecotimber has since been harvested, shipped to Australia and sold with the benefit of Forestry Stewardship Council certification.

== See also ==
- Lake Murray languages
