= South Papua =

Province in Western New Guinea, Indonesia

South Papua Papua Selatan Anim Ha
- Province with special status
- Province of South Papua; Provinsi Papua Selatan
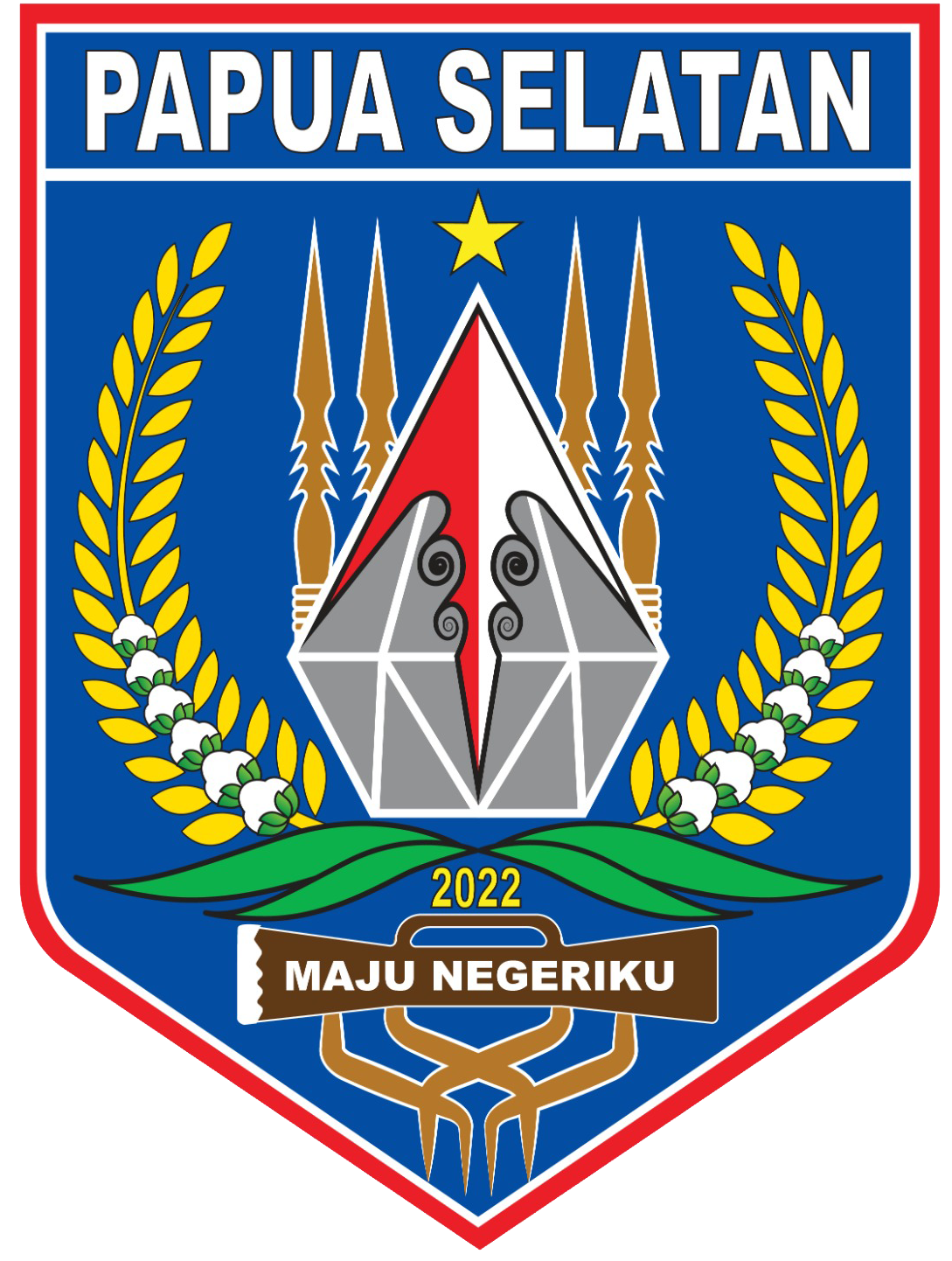
- Coat of arms
- Motto: Maju Negeriku; "Onward My Country"
- South Papua in Indonesia
- Interactive map of South Papua
- Country: Indonesia
- Region: Western New Guinea (Eastern Indonesia)
- Capital: Salor, Merauke
- Largest city: Merauke, Merauke

Government
  - Body: South Papua Provincial Government
  - Governor: Apolo Safanpo (PDI-P)
  - Vice Governor: Paskalis Imadawa
  - Legislature: South Papua House of Representatives (DPRPS)

Area
  - Total: 117,849.16 km^{2} (45,501.82 sq mi)

Population (mid 2025)
  - Total: 549,650
  - Density: 4.6640/km^{2} (12.080/sq mi)

Languages
  - Official language: Indonesian
  - Native languages of South Papua: Asmat, Boazi, Citak, Kolopom, Korowai, Marind, Mombum, Muyu, Sawi, Wambon, Yaqay, and others
  - Also spoken: Javanese, Kei, Papuan Malay, and others

Demographics
  - Religions: Christianity 72.54%; Catholicism 49.93%; Protestantism 22.61%; Islam 27.31%; Hinduism 0.11%; Buddhism 0.04%
  - Ethnic groups: Asmat, Citak, Kombai, Korowai, Marind, Muyu, Sawi, Wambon (natives), Javanese (migrant), and others
- Time zone: UTC+9 (Indonesia Eastern Time)
- HDI (2024): ▲0.689 (35th) – (Medium)
- Website: papuaselatan.go.id

South Papua, officially the South Papua Province (Indonesian: Provinsi Papua Selatan), is an Indonesian province located in the southern portion of Papua, following the borders of the Papuan customary region of Anim Ha. Formally established on 25 July 2022 and including the four most southern regencies that were previously part of the province of Papua and before 11 December 2002 had been a single larger Merauke Regency, it covers a land area of 117,849.16 km^{2}, about the same area as Pennsylvania or Kirov Oblast (or 90% of that of England). This area had a population of 513,617 at the 2020 Census, while the official estimate as at mid 2025 was 549,650 (285,040 males and 264,610 females), making it the least populous province in Indonesia.

It shares land borders with the separate nation of Papua New Guinea to the east, as well as the Indonesian provinces of Highland Papua and Central Papua to the north and northwest, respectively. South Papua also faces the Arafura Sea in the west and south, which is a maritime border with Australia. Merauke is the economic centre of South Papua, while its administrative centre is the town of Salor located in Kurik District of Merauke Regency, around 60 km northwest of Merauke town.

South Papua's landscape predominantly consists of lowland areas characterized by extensive swamps and massive rivers such as the Digul and Maro. Indigenous ethnic groups inhabit this region, such as the Asmat, Marind, Muyu, and Korowai. They rely on sago and fish as staple dietary sources. Certain tribes like the Asmat were recognized for their wood carving and boating culture. There is also a massive amount of migrants such as Javanese people because of the transmigration program sponsored by the government to convert vast amounts of swamps into rice paddies and increase this region's population. South Papua is also home to the renowned Wasur National Park, an expansive wetland area with rich biodiversity including the agile wallaby, mound-building termites or musamus, and the bird of paradise.

== History ==
The wetland region of South Papua, before the arrival of Europeans, was home to several indigenous tribes. These tribes included the Asmat, Marind and Wambon, who still maintain their ancestral traditions in the area. The Marind tribe, also known as the Malind, lived in groups along the rivers in the Merauke region, and their way of life centered around hunting, gathering, and farming. However, the Marind tribe was also notorious for their practice of headhunting. They would travel in boats along the rivers and coasts to distant settlements, where they would behead the inhabitants. The heads of their victims would then be taken back to their villages to be preserved and celebrated.

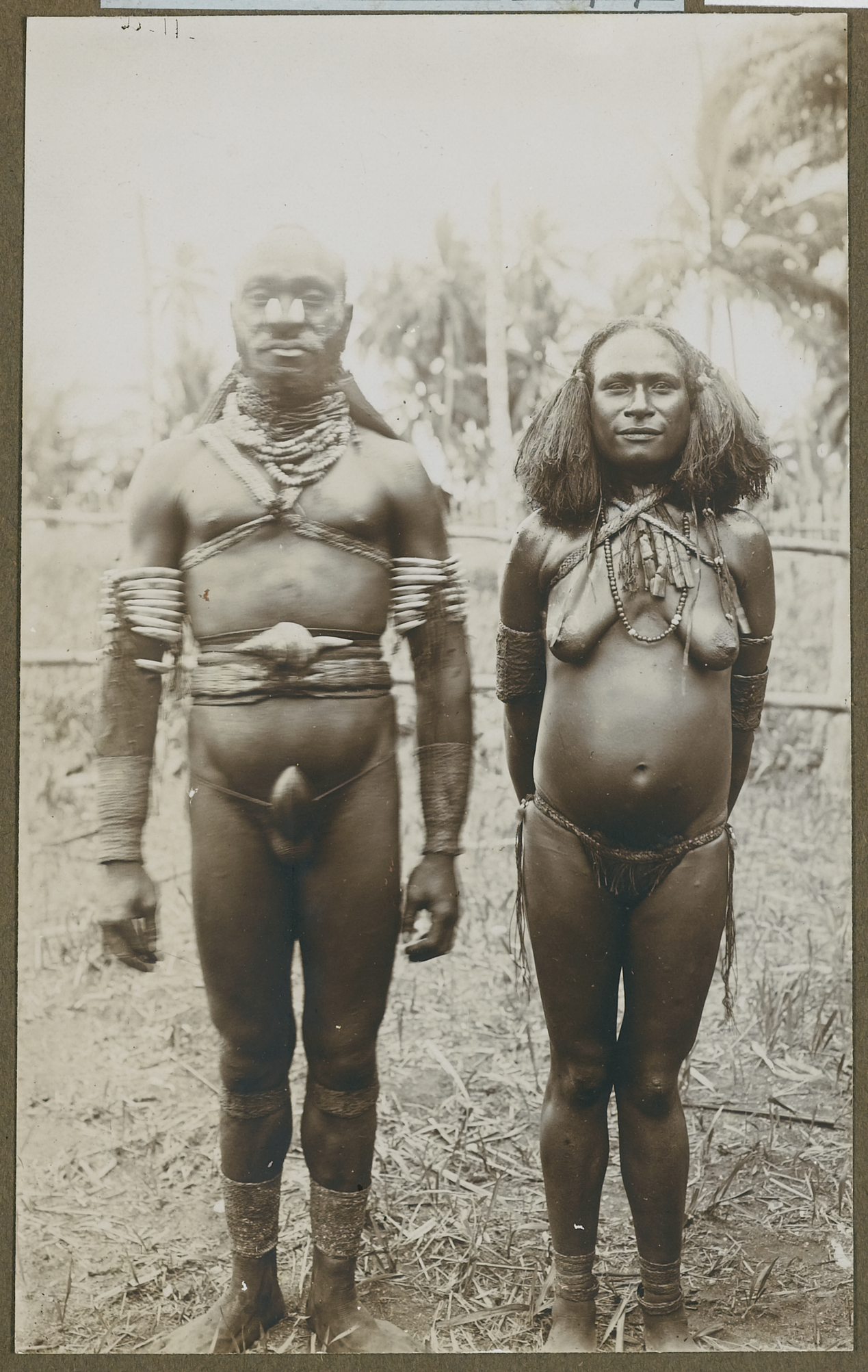
Marind people in 1910

In the 19th century, European powers began to colonize the island of New Guinea. The island was divided along a straight line, with the western portion falling under the jurisdiction of the Dutch New Guinea region and the eastern portion becoming British New Guinea. Marind people often crossed the border to engage in headhunting activities. In 1902, the Dutch established a military base at the eastern tip of South Papua, near the Maro River, to strengthen the border and eliminate this tradition. This base was named Merauke, after its location. The Dutch also established a Catholic mission in Merauke to spread their religion and to further discourage the practice of headhunting. During the Dutch colonial period, the Javanese people were brought to Merauke to cultivate rice fields. This influx of laborers further contributed to the growth of the town and the development of the surrounding region. Eventually, it became the capital of Afdeeling Zuid Nieuw Guinea or the South New Guinea Province.

In addition to the Maro River, the Dutch also became aware of another, larger river known as the Digul River. In the 1920s, the Dutch government sent an expedition to explore the interior of Papua. The idea emerged to use the remote region as a detention camp, and a suitable location was identified at the headwaters of the Digul River or Boven-Digoel. A concentration camp called Tanah Merah was established, it was a densely forested area surrounded by the harsh Digul River, making it difficult for prisoners to escape. Additionally, the region was plagued by malaria, which further discouraged escape attempts. Over the years, several notable figures were detained at the camp, including Mohammad Hatta and Sutan Sjahrir. After the Dutch left in the 1960s, Tanah Merah became more populated and eventually became the capital of the Boven Digoel Regency.

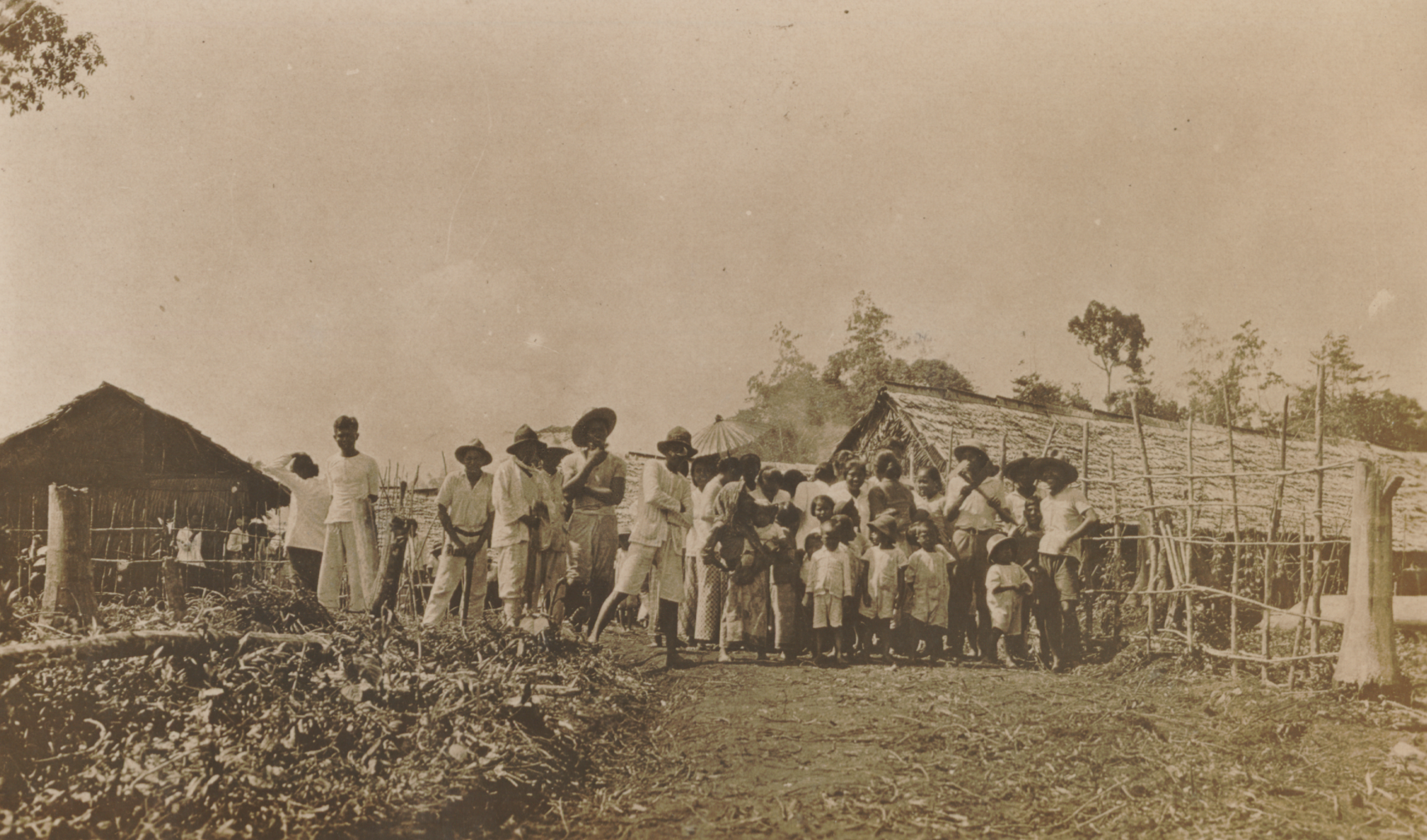
Prisoner in Boven-Digoel concentration camp

In the 1960s, Indonesian forces took control of all of Dutch New Guinea, including the former Zuid Nieuw Guinea. Following the takeover, the territory was reorganized, and the former Zuid Nieuw Guinea became the Merauke Regency, with its capital located in Merauke. On 11 December 2002, the Merauke Regency was further divided into four separate regencies: Merauke, Mappi, Asmat, and Boven Digoel. These regencies were established to better serve the needs of the local populations and provide more effective governance across the region. More recently, on 25 July 2022, the former territory of the Merauke Regency was officially re-united with other regions in southern Papua to form the new province of South Papua, following the signing of Law No. 14/2022. The name "South Papua" (Papua Selatan) was chosen instead of "Anim Ha" due to the latter term's historical origins during Dutch rule and its potential to be demeaning to other tribes in southern Papua. In contrast, "South Papua" was selected as an inclusive and unifying name that avoids any negative connotations and reflects the diverse and vibrant cultural heritage of the region. The public reception towards South Papua was far more positive compared to the other new provinces of Central Papua and Highlands Papua, with residents spreading a giant Indonesian flag in front of the regent office of Merauke after the province's establishment.

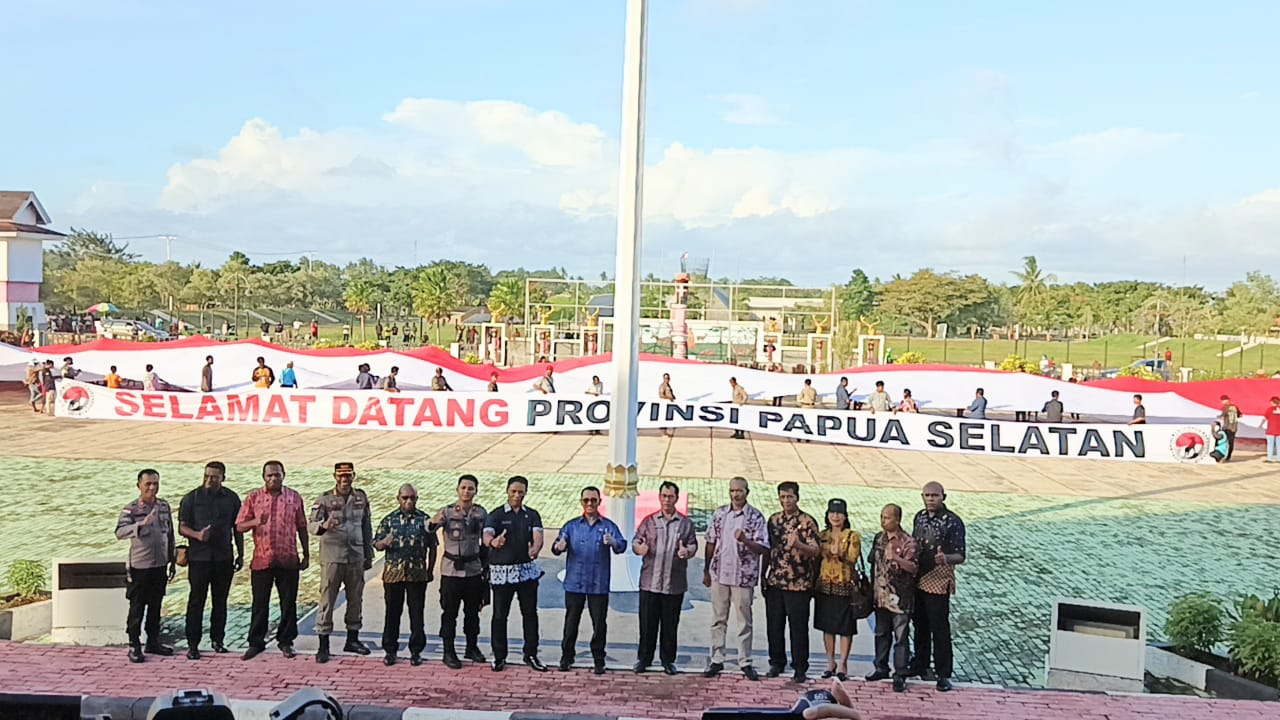
Celebration of South Papua establishment

In 2007, the Regent of Merauke, John Gebze, spearheaded the initiation of the Merauke Integrated Food and Energy Estate (MIFEE), a large-scale development project aimed at enhancing Indonesia's food security. Situated in Merauke, an area renowned for its extensive lowland and fertile terrain, the project sought to capitalize on the region's vast land for agricultural purposes. Originally dubbed the Merauke Integrated Rice Estate (MIRE), with a primary focus on rice cultivation, the initiative later broadened its scope to encompass additional crops such as sugar cane, corn, and oil palm. Officially inaugurated in 2010 during the presidency of Susilo Bambang Yudhoyono, the project garnered participation from numerous private investors. However, its progression faced significant challenges, stemming from divergent perspectives among government entities, investors, and the indigenous Marind community, who held land rights in the area. Furthermore, mounting pressure from non-governmental organizations (NGOs) decrying the project as a violation of indigenous rights and environmental degradation prompted a cessation of new land development activities by the involved companies. During the time of President Joko Widodo, the Food Estate project was revived in various regions with 200,000 hectares of land designated for Papua Island. The main commodities are corn and rice and are located, among others, in Mappi, Boven Digoel and Merauke.

== Geography ==
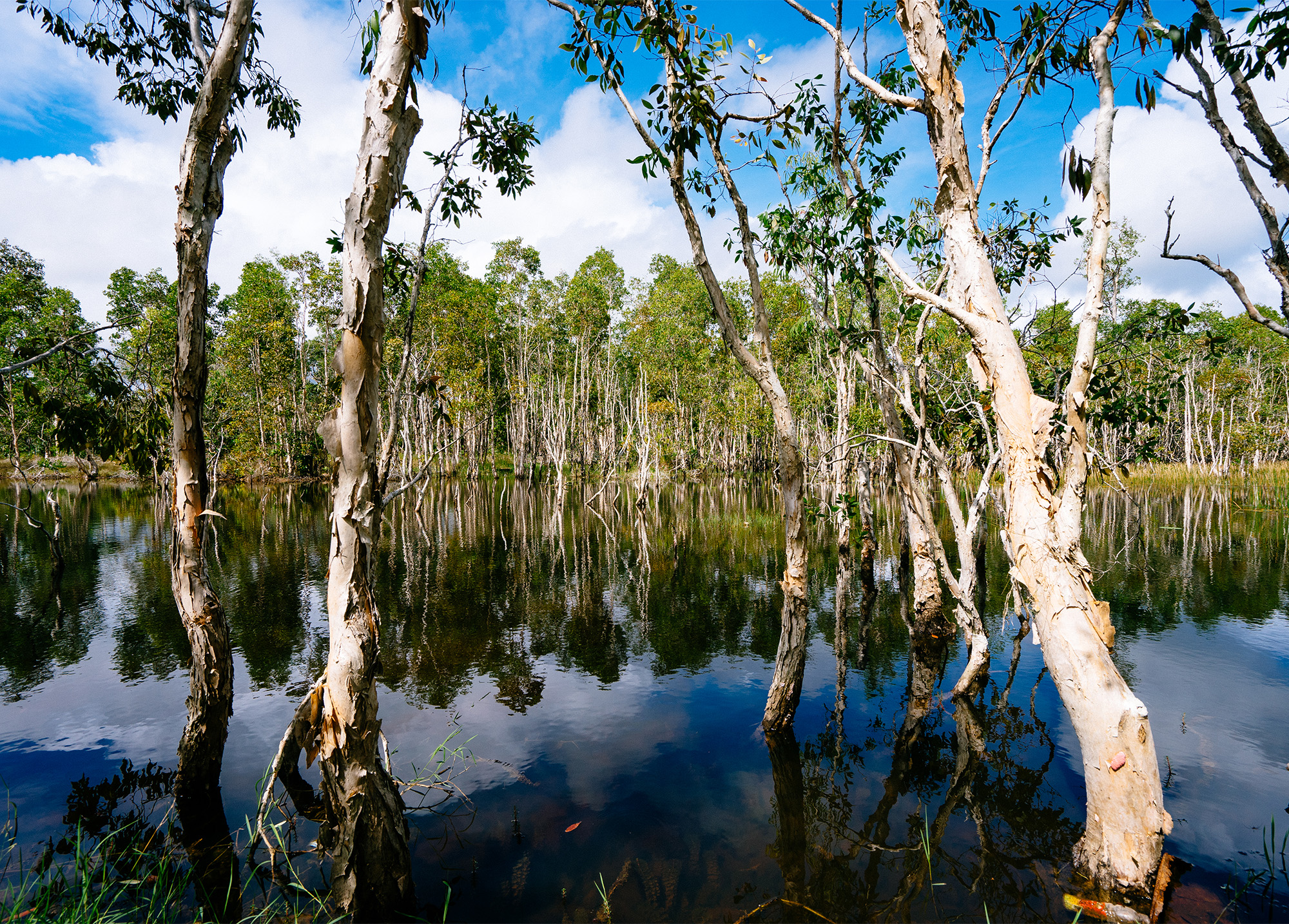
Wetland of Wasur National Park

Geographically, most of the South Papua region is located in lowland area which are dominated by two ecoregions or geographical areas that include an ecosystem and biodiversity within it. These ecoregions are Southern New Guinea freshwater swamp forests and Southern New Guinea lowland rain forests. These two ecoregions are crossed by large rivers originated from New Guinea Highlands which is the highest mountainous area in Indonesia. In South Papua, many sago trees are found, which are a staple food for local tribes. Sago thrives in lowland environments and exhibits robust growth even in areas prone to flooding, including swamps, coastal regions, peatlands, and along riverbanks.

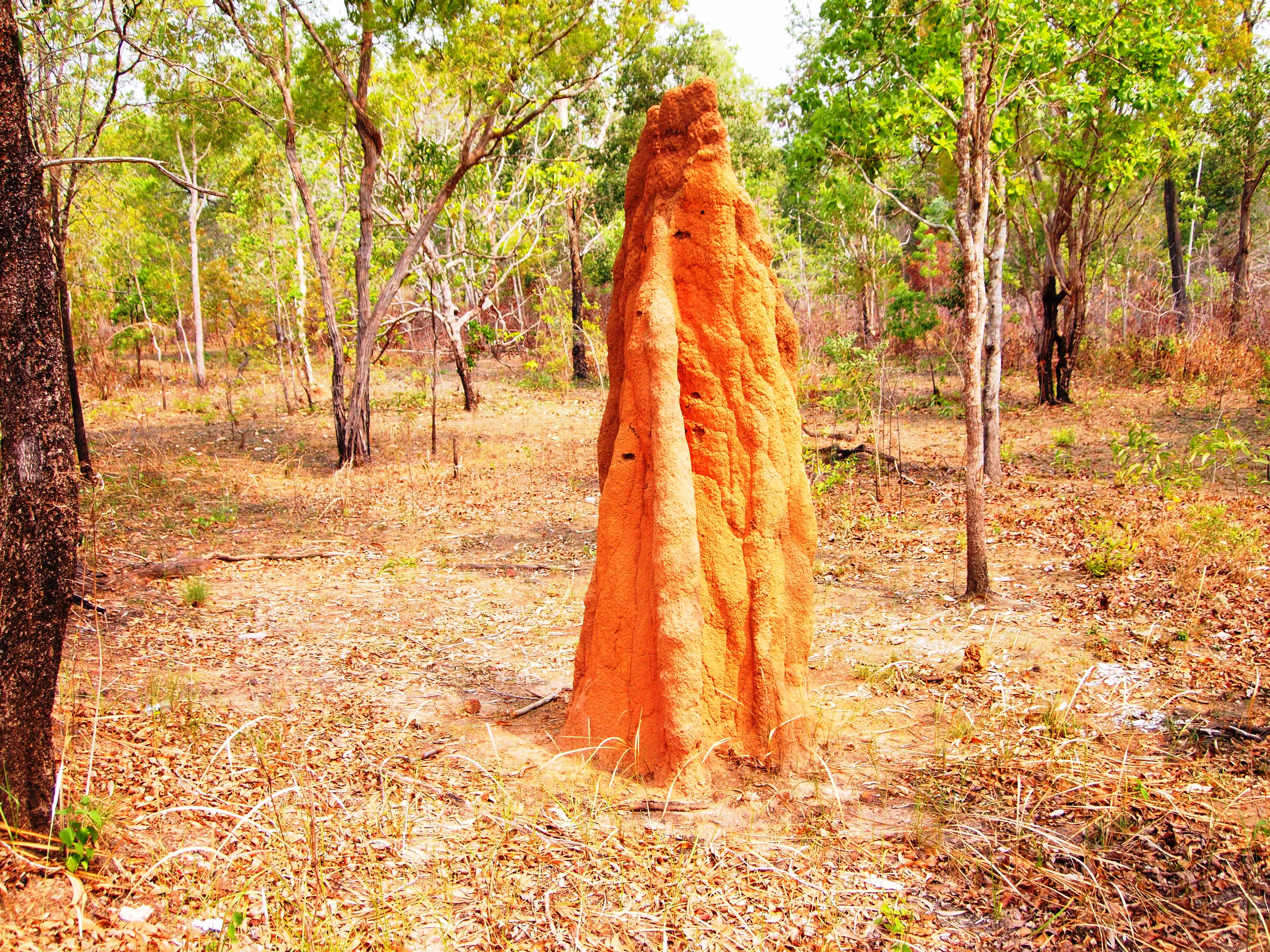
Musamus or giant termite mound

Additionally, there is a smaller but unique ecoregion called Trans-Fly savanna and grasslands which are part of Wasur National Park, a Ramsar wetland of international importance. This ecoregion consists of swamp forest, coastal forest, and vast savanna that are flooded at various times, creating a wetland area with massive biodiversity like agile wallaby, mound-building termites or musamus, and the bird of paradise. This wetland also attracts migratory bird for example magpie goose from Australia, also known locally as Boha Wasur.

The South Papua region was designated as a transmigration program site due to its expansive lowland areas with vast amount of water which offer ideal conditions for rice cultivation. Transmigration districts such as Semangga, Tanah Miring, and Kurik serve as primary sources of agricultural produce destined for markets in the City of Merauke. However, the influx of migrant populations into these areas has introduced non-native species, such as Javan rusa and tilapia fish, which disrupt the established ecosystem. Particularly, the adaptable tilapia fish proliferates rapidly in this environment, outcompeting indigenous fish species and consequently dominating the catches of fishermen in Merauke's rivers.

== Politics ==
=== Government and administrative divisions ===
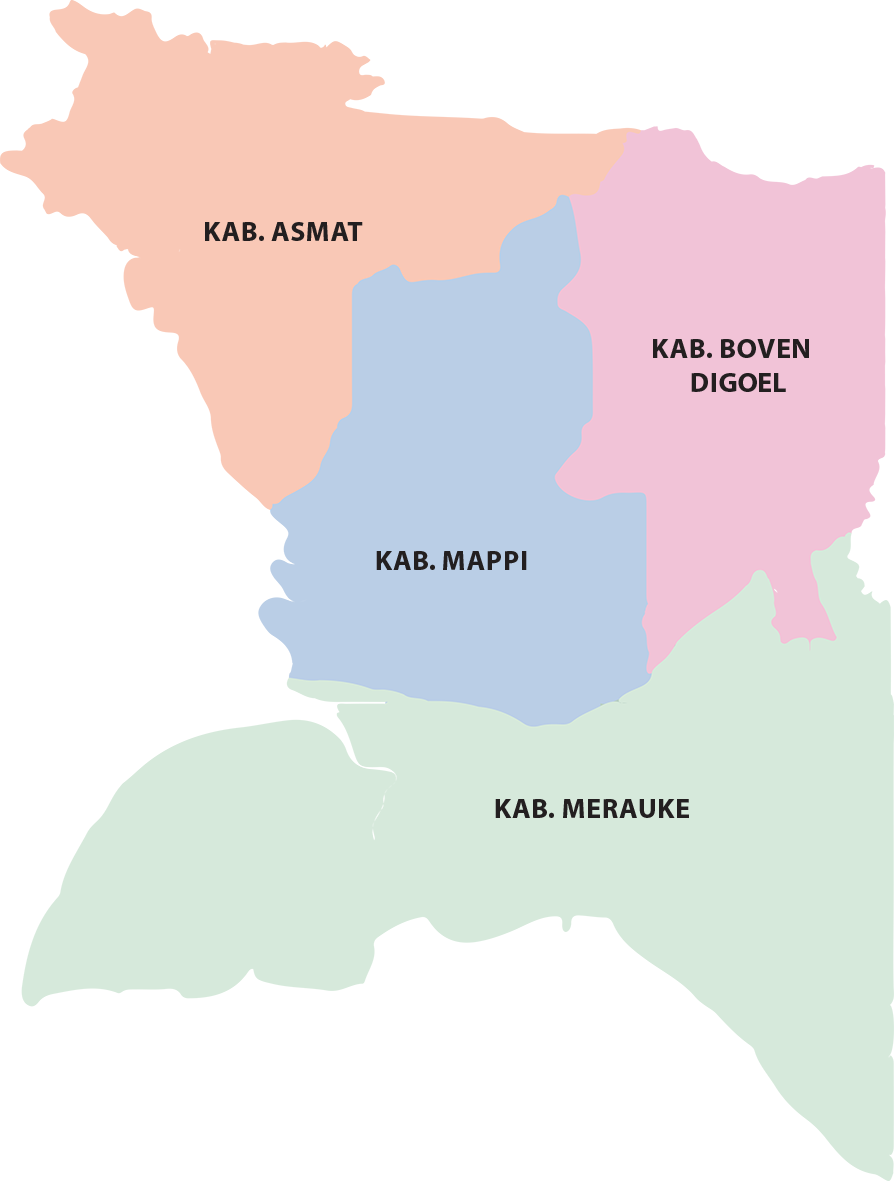
624x624x

South Papua is divided into four regencies (kabupaten), the least amount compared to other Indonesian provinces. Before 11 December 2002, all four of the current regencies constituted a single Merauke Regency, which was split into the present four regencies on that date. The table below gives the areas of all the regencies, together with their populations at the 2020 Census and according to the official estimates as of mid-2025.

Kode Wilayah	Name of Regency	Seat	Regent	Area in km^{2}	Pop'n Census 2020	Pop'n Estimate mid 2025	HDI 2022	No. of districts	No. of villages	Coat of arms	Location map
93.01	Merauke Regency	Merauke	Romanus Mbaraka	45,013.35	230,932	241,540	0.712 (High)	20	190	pus	
93.02	Boven Digoel Regency	Tanah Merah	Hengky Yaluwo	23,558.27	64,285	70,280	0.625 (Medium)	20	112	pus	
93.03	Mappi Regency	Kepi	Krisostomus Yohanes; Agawemu	24,262.23	108,295	116,950	0.596 (Medium)	15	164	pus	
93.04	Asmat Regency	Agats	Elisa Kambu	25,015.31	110,105	120,880	0.522 (Low)	19	221	pus	
Totals				117,849.16	513,617	549,650		74	687		

The province now forms one of Indonesia's 84 national electoral districts to elect members to the People's Representative Council. The South Papua Electoral District consists of all of the 4 regencies in the province, and elects 3 members to the People's Representative Council.

== Demographics ==
Historical population
Year	Pop.	±%
1971	160,727	—
1980	172,662	+7.4%
1990	243,722	+41.2%
2000	291,680	+19.7%
2010	409,735	+40.5%
2020	513,617	+25.4%
2025	549,650	+7.0%
Source: Statistics Indonesia 2025 and earlier. South Papua was part of Papua Province until 2022.

South Papua had a population of 513,617 at the 2020 Census, while the official estimate as at mid 2025 was 549,650 - making it the least populous province in Indonesia.

South Papua is inhabited by local Papuan people from various ethnic groups. South Papua is part of the customary region of Anim Ha, a distinct region with unique culture compared to other parts of Papua owing to its geography located in a lowland area with a vast amount of wetland and large rivers. Some of the ethnic groups living here include the Marind (with subgroups such as the Kimaam and the Marori) and the Yei peoples in Merauke, the Muyu and the Wambon peoples in Boven Digoel, the Awyu and the Wiyagar peoples from Mappi, and the Asmat and the Sawi from Asmat. There are also isolated ethnic group found in the border near Highland Papua province like the Kombai and the Korowai peoples. Each of the ethnic groups mentioned have their own unique languages.

=== Religion ===
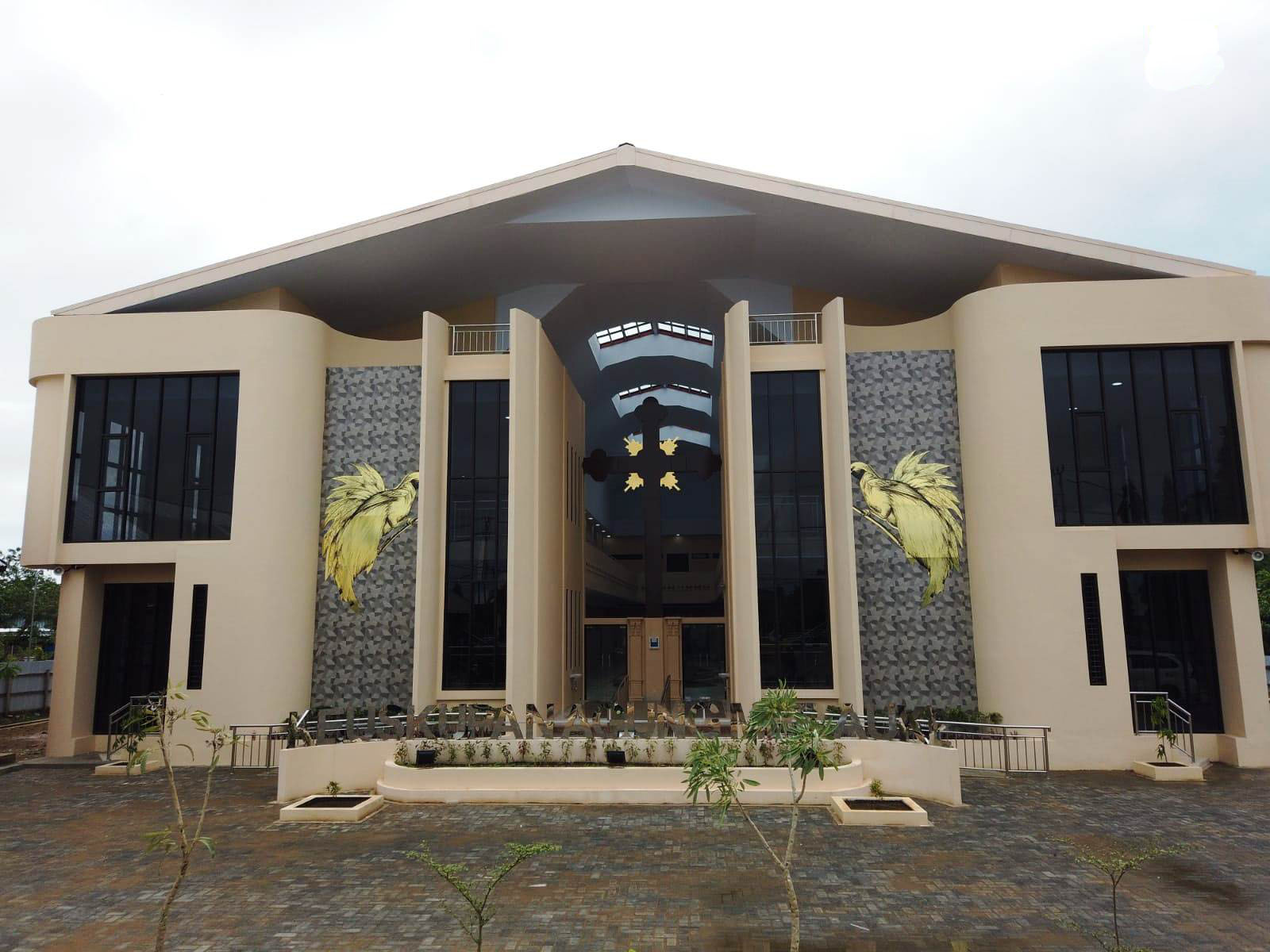
Newly built Roman Catholic Archdiocese of Merauke

According to Ministry of Home Affairs, the percentage of religion in South Papua in 2023 is 72.57% Christianity (49.62% Catholic and 22.95% Protestant), 27.28% Islamic, 0.11% Hindu, and 0.04% Buddhist. Thus, South Papua is the only province on the island of Papua with a percentage of Catholicism that exceeds other religions. This significant number of Catholic residents supports the formation of Roman Catholic Archdiocese of Merauke and Roman Catholic Diocese of Agats which are the ecclesiastical province in the Roman Catholic Church led by either archbishop or bishop.

== Culture ==
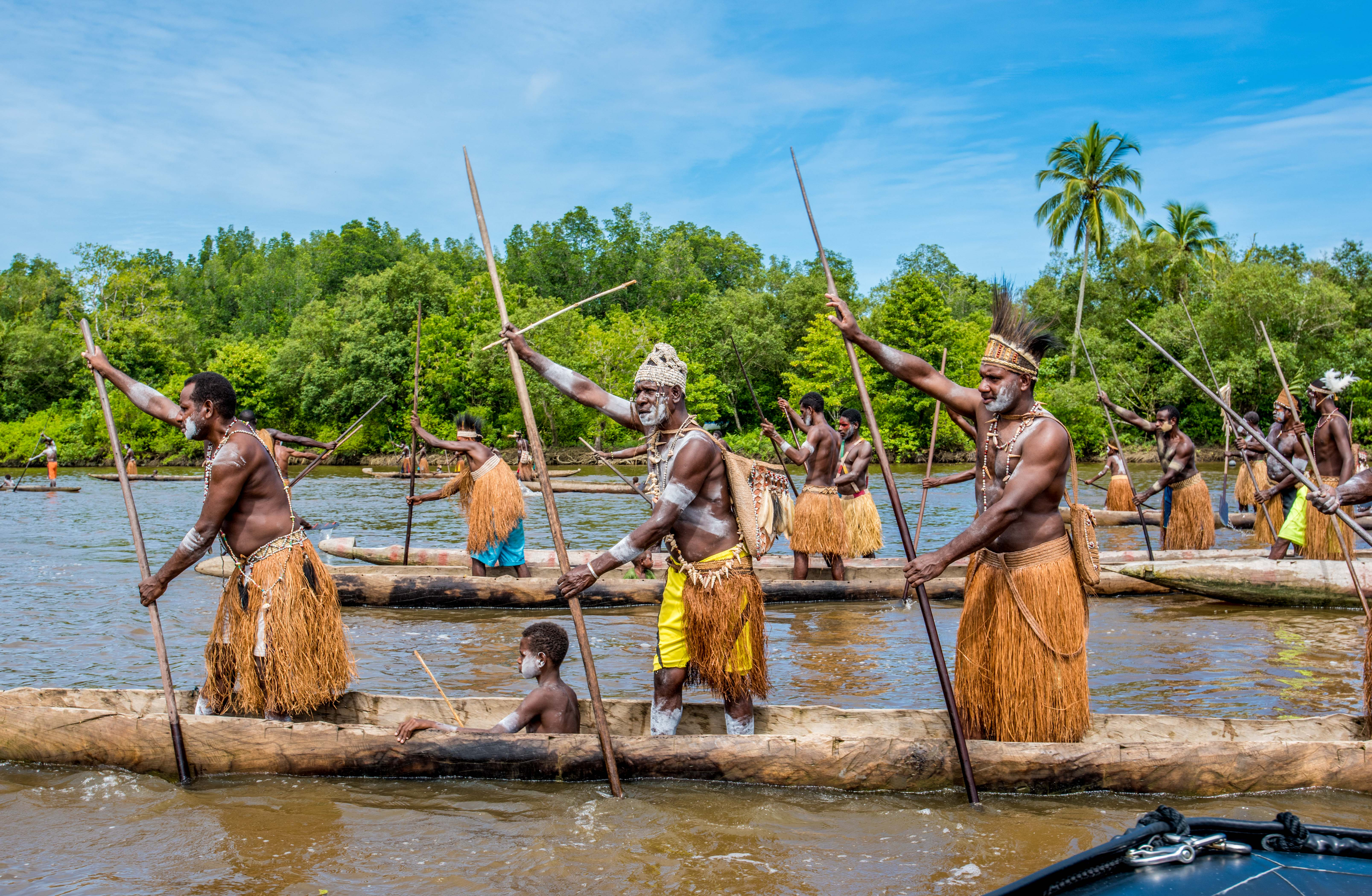
Canoe warriors in Asmat Culture Festival

The native Papuan people have a distinct culture and traditions that cannot be found in other parts of Indonesia. Coastal Papuans are usually more willing to accept modern influence into their daily lives, which in turn diminishes their original culture and traditions. Meanwhile, most inland Papuans still preserve their original culture and traditions, although their way of life over the past century is tied to the encroachment of modernity and globalization. Each Papuan tribe usually practices its traditions and culture, which may differ greatly from one tribe to another.

Hunting as practiced by Marind people usually begins with a traditionally controlled burn of peat bog and swamps, it was then left for three days to a week for new shoots to grow, which will invite game animals such as deer, pigs, saham (Notamacropus agilis). The hunting party consists of usually of 7-8 people, then go to the burned locations while bringing food and drink, ranging from tubers, sago, to drinking water, for several days. A temporary hut called bivak would be constructed from barks from Bus, a type of eucalyptus tree to form the walls and the roof made from Lontar leaves. As with many coastal communities from the Moluccas to Papua, Sasi is practiced, which are markers usually constructed from wood and janur to mark the prohibition of harvesting either from land or sea for a while to preserve natural resources and for sustainable harvest. To open and close sasi regions such as forests, usually the Marind-Kanume mark with two arrows shot to the west and to the east to respect three clans that inhabited the area as well as other rituals which can take up to forty days. Violators of the prohibition would be punished with payment of Wati leaves and pigs. Failure of payments will result in referral to local security officers to be put on trial.

=== Wood carving ===
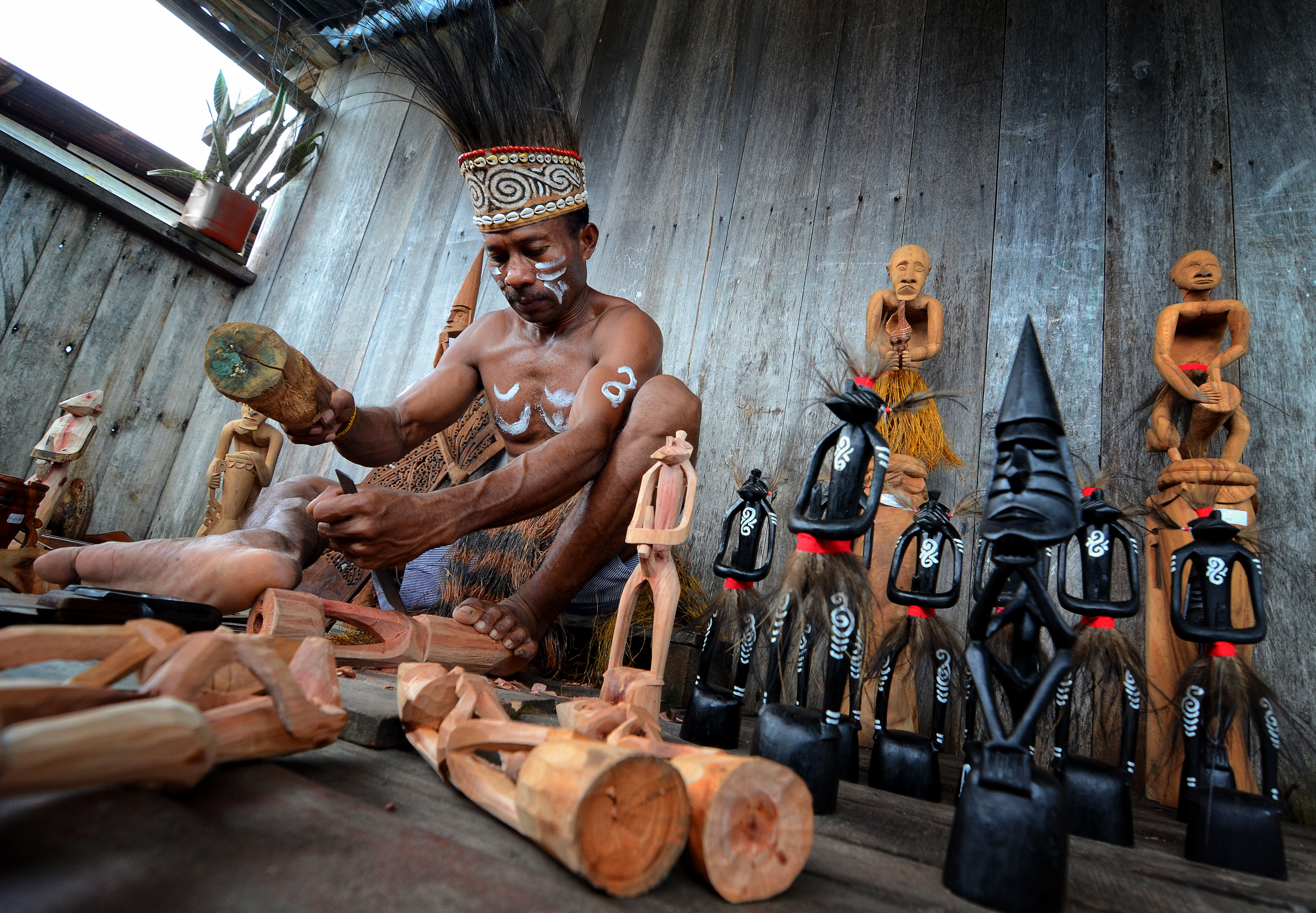
Asmat wood carver

Asmat people are famous internationally for their wood carving. Some of its carving can be found in various museum for example in Asmat Museum of Culture and Progress. Asmat carvings have various motifs such as nature, living creatures, and everyday life. The Asmat people consider that carvings are not only works of art but part of their religious rituals to connect with their ancestors. Asmat carvings are made from local materials such as Merbau and nutmeg wood. One of the famous Asmat carvings is the Bisj Pole which measures more than 3 meters. This pillar consists of figures arranged in tiers. This figure represents the spirits of ancestors killed by their enemies. The top of the pole is decorated like wings.

Due to the swampy terrain and extensive river networks in South Papua, numerous tribes rely on boats for their daily transportation needs. These traditional vessels, known as perahu lesung, are crafted by hollowing out the center of a single tree trunk and are often embellished with intricate carvings. Typically, these boats are propelled by multiple individuals standing upright and rowing. In ancient times, the Asmat people utilized these boats not only for transportation but also as integral elements of their headhunting customs, which instilled fear in neighboring communities. Historically, Asmat residents would navigate their boats to distant villages, where they would carry out raids and massacres on the inhabitants.

=== Architecture ===
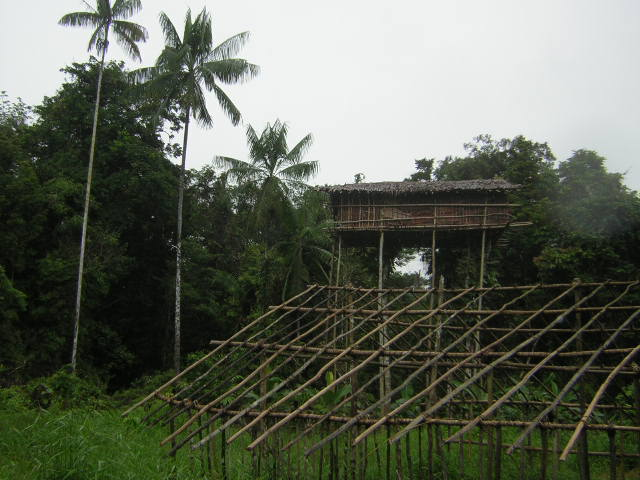
Korowai's Khaim treehouse in the background; a Khaum house is being constructed in the foreground.

Many tribes in South Papua traditionally build treehouses. These are a type of stilt house, with the main central column (stilt) being a tree stump. There are three types of traditional houses they build based on their height: near ground level, around 5–15 metres, and the tallest at about 30 metres.

Near ground level houses are similar to a typical stilt house, not requiring a tree stump. Aside from their function as a home, they can be large and function as a hall to accommodate traditional festivals like Sago Grub Festivals and ceremonies like the men's initiation ceremony. These are called Gotad (Marind), Jeu (Asmat), Xaum/Khaum (Korowai), Ibena (Kombai), and Juro (Wanggom).

5-15 metre tall houses are what are colloquially called Rumah Tinggi (lit. 'high house'). They are built around a large tree (usually Banyan or Matoa), whose branches are pruned. Other supporting stilts are constructed in a rectangular grid pattern. The Korowai also added leaves and grasses ('khakhlakh') to cover the bottom of the stilts in the ground hole to prevent 'laleo' (evil spirits) from entering the house, which can go up from the ground through the stilts. The floor of the house used tree barks, but they don't last long, or small horizontal tree logs lashed together. The roof is made from sago leaves tied to supporting logs, forming a gable roof. Construction for a "rumah tinggi" usually takes seven days, and the structure then lasts up to three to five years. These are called Khaim/Xaim (Korowai), Guoro (Kombai), Anggulu (Wanggom), Ambip (Muyu), etc.

The tallest of houses, at around 30 metres or higher, are Rumah Pengintai. Normally people do not live there; aside from its primary function as a lookout house, people stay there to hide when attacked or to hide women from another clan in bride kidnapping practice to prevent clan wars. These are called Luop (Korowai), Walina (Kombai), and Ayomru (Muyu).

=== Cuisine ===
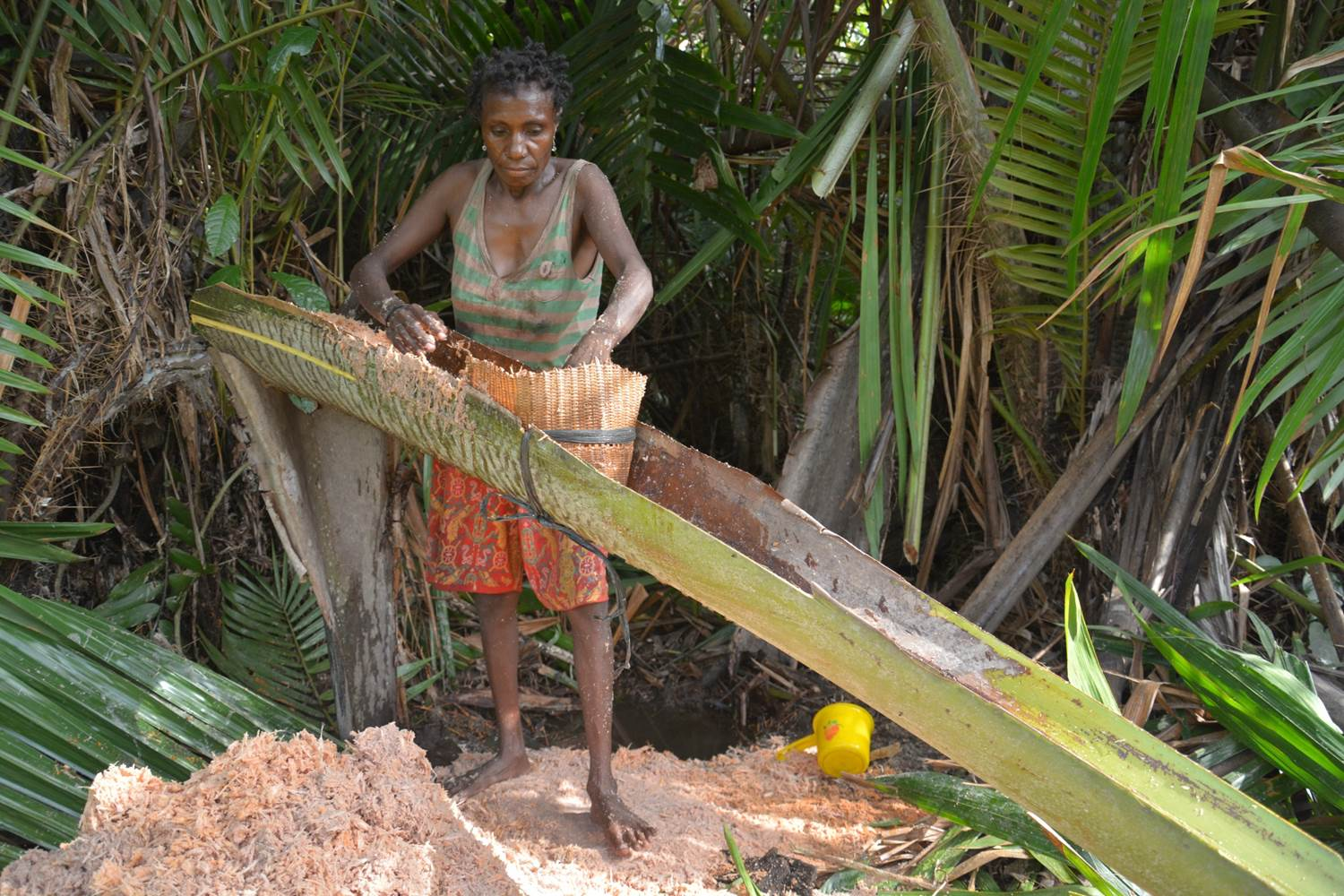
Sago is a typical Papuan staple food

The staple food of South Papua, in general, is sago, but some tribes also have other staple foods; for example, bananas, ubi (Dioscorea alata), keladi (Colocasia esculenta), sweet potato (Ipomoea batatas), and sukun (Artocarpus incisa and Artocarpus camansi). Sago is either processed as a pancake or sago congee called papeda, usually eaten with yellow soup made from tuna, red snapper or other fishes spiced with turmeric, lime, and other spices. On some coasts and lowlands in Papua, sago is the main ingredient in all the foods. Sagu bakar, sagu lempeng, and sagu bola, have become dishes that are well known to all of Papua, especially in the custom folk culinary tradition of Mappi, Asmat, and Mimika. Papeda is one of the sago foods that is rarely found. As Papua is considered a non-Muslim majority region, pork is readily available everywhere. In Papua, pig roast which consists of pork and yams roasted in heated stones placed in a hole dug in the ground and covered with leaves; this cooking method is called bakar batu (burning the stone), and it is an important cultural and social event among Papuan people. The Marind people used this cooking method or using burning bomi thermite mound made by Macrotermes sp to cook a pizza-like dish called "Sagu Sef", which is made from dough from sago and coconut with sago grub and deer meat. Spices used can include shallot, garlic, coriander, pepper, and salt, which are then mixed and covered with banana leaves, to cook it evenly hot stones or bomi would be put on top of the dish.

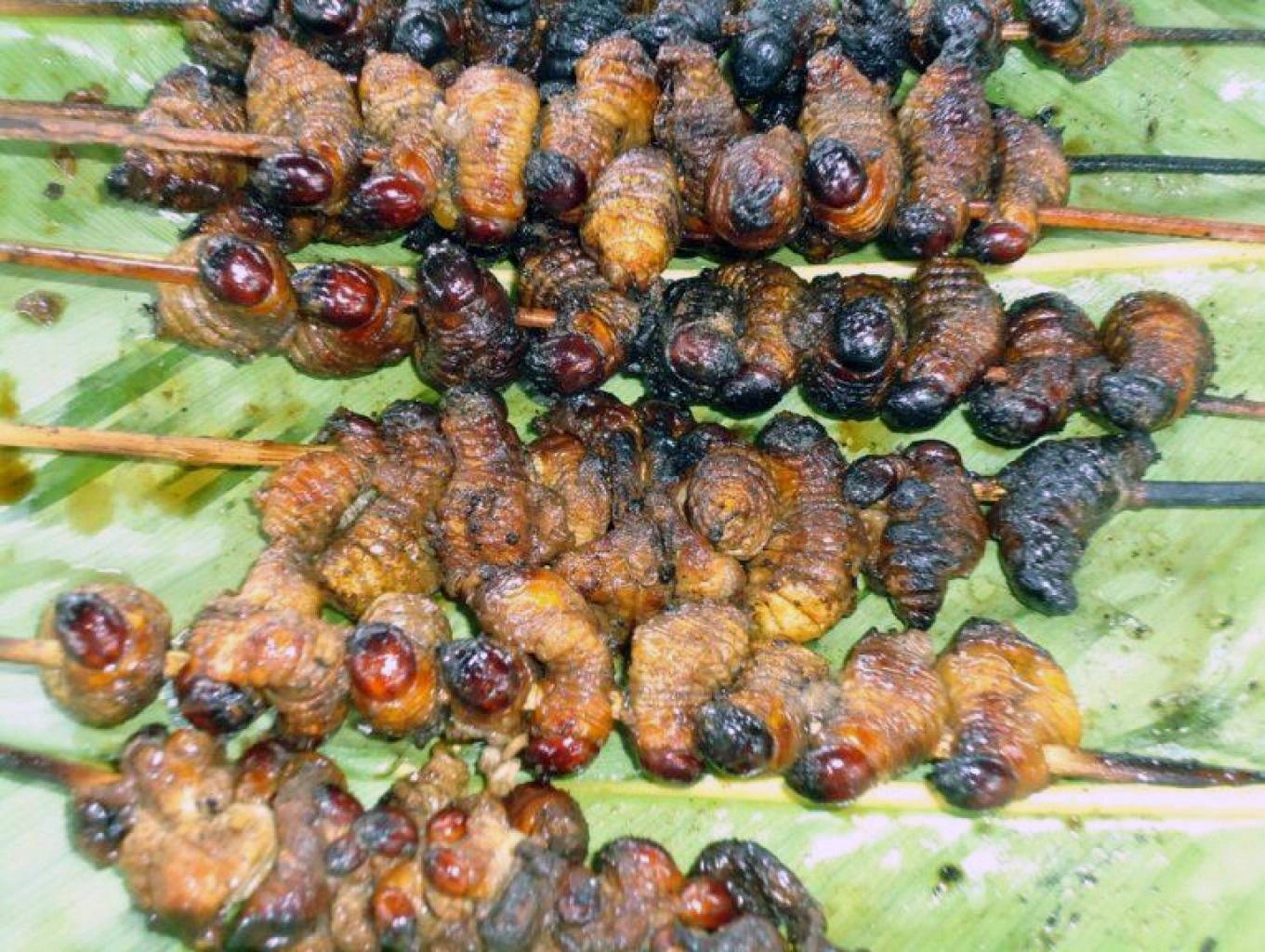
Sago grub satay

Common Papuan snacks are usually made out of sago. Kue bagea (also called sago cake) is a cake originating from Ternate in North Maluku, although it can also be found in Papua. It has a round shape and creamy color. Bagea has a hard consistency that can be softened in tea or water, to make it easier to chew. It is prepared using sago, a plant-based starch derived from the sago palm or sago cycad. Sagu Lempeng is a typical Papuan snack that is made in the form of processed sago in the form of plates. Sagu Lempeng is also a favorite for travelers. But it is very difficult to find places to eat because this bread is a family consumption and is usually eaten immediately after cooking. Making sago plates is as easy as making other breads. Sago is processed by baking it by printing rectangles or rectangles with iron which is ripe like white bread. Initially tasteless, but recently it has begun to vary with sugar to get a sweet taste. It has a tough texture and can be enjoyed by mixing it or dipping it in water to make it softer. Sago porridge is a type of porridge that is found in Papua. This porridge is usually eaten with yellow soup made of mackerel or tuna then seasoned with turmeric and lime. Sago porridge is sometimes also consumed with boiled tubers, such as those from cassava or sweet potato. Vegetable papaya flowers and sautéed kale are often served as side dishes to accompany the sago porridge. In the inland regions, Sago worms are usually served as a type of snack dish. Sago worms come from sago trunks which are cut and left to rot. The rotting stems cause the worms to come out. The shape of the sago worms varies, ranging from the smallest to the largest size of an adult's thumb. These sago caterpillars are usually eaten alive or cooked beforehand, such as stir-frying, cooking, frying, and then skewered. But over time, the people of Papua used to process these sago caterpillars into sago caterpillar satay. To make satay from this sago caterpillar, the method is no different from making satay in general, namely on skewers with a skewer and grilled over hot coals.

== Economy ==
=== Agriculture and forestry ===
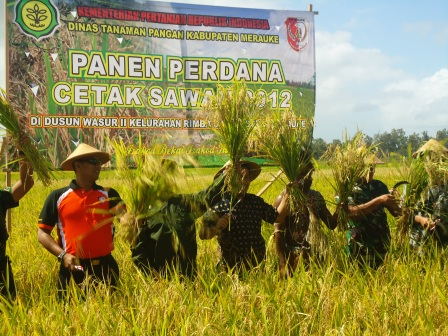
Harvesting of newly created rice fields in Merauke

The vast and fertile geography of South Papua offers abundant agricultural potential. Since the Dutch colonial era, the region has seen the importation of Javanese settlers to cultivate rice fields, particularly in Merauke. This practice continued through the transmigration program post-independence. Consequently, traditional local staples such as sago and tubers have gradually been supplanted by rice and instant food options.

In 2010, the government under Susilo Bambang Yudhoyono initiated the Merauke Integrated Food and Energy Estate (MIFEE) program, aimed at positioning Merauke Regency as one of Indonesia's primary food hubs. Targeted crops under this program encompass rice, corn, and oil palm. However, the project encountered setbacks due to disputes between governmental bodies, corporations, indigenous groups, and non-governmental organizations (NGOs) concerning environmental degradation and alleged human rights infringements against indigenous communities. Consequently, no further land was developed under the initiative.

In South Papua, extensive oil palms plantations are established in Merauke and Boven Digoel, managed primarily by large corporations. Notably, PT Tunas Sawa Erma (TSE), a subsidiary of Korindo from South Korea, is actively involved in this sector. In addition to palm oil, Korindo is engaged in the timber industry. Under the TSE Group umbrella, operations span across Merauke and Boven Digoel, comprising several subsidiaries, including PT Tunas Sawa Erma (TSE), PT Dongin Prabawa (DP), PT Berkat Cipta Abadi (BCA), and PT Papua Agro Lestari (PAL). The distribution of oil palm plantations in South Papua includes the Ngguti, Ulilin and Muting districts in Merauke Regency and the Jair district in Boven Digoel Regency. One of the prominent forestry products in South Papua is sago, serving as the staple food for indigenous tribes residing in the region. In addition to sago, the area is abundant in agarwood or gaharu, derived from species such as Aquilaria and Gyrinops, prized for its aromatic qualities. Agarwood are notably found in Mappi and Asmat. This resource plays a significant role in the livelihoods of tribes in the interior regions due to its high market value. While some gaharu wood is obtained from standing trees, a considerable amount is sourced from mud. Gaharu lumpur, as it is termed, originates from trees that have previously fallen and become submerged in mud, yet retain their aromatic properties. In 2020, more than 2 tons of Mappi's agarwood worth 790 million were sold to Jakarta via Merauke's Mopah Airport.

=== Fisheries ===
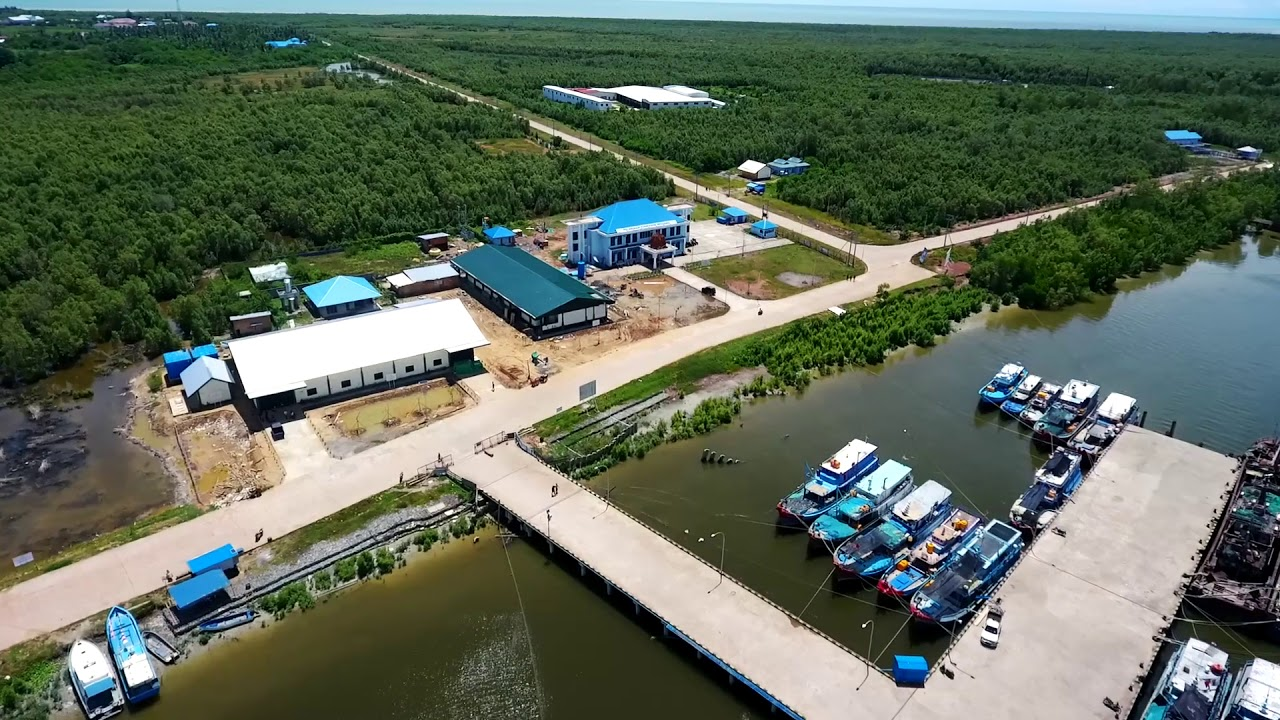
Merauke fisheries port

Arafura Sea, situated to the south of Papua Island, boasts considerable fisheries potential. As highlighted by the Minister of Maritime Affairs and Fisheries, Sakti Wahyu Trenggono, the area witnesses the presence of approximately 20 thousand non-local fishing vessels, resulting in the marginalization of local fishermen and a decline in fish stocks. To address this issue, the Ministry of Maritime Affairs and Fisheries aims to regulate these external vessels by prioritizing the interests of local fishermen and enhancing infrastructure at the Merauke fishing port. This strategy entails mandating that fish caught in the region be transported to Merauke and dispatched via this port, thereby facilitating economic contributions to the local community. To preserve the wealth of natural resources in the Arafura Sea, the Government of South Papua, the Ministry of Maritime Affairs and Fisheries, and UNDP launched the first Marine protected area (MPA) in South Papua Province in July 2023 located on Kolepom Island with an area of 356,337 ha.

One highly prized fishery product is fish maw, the swim bladder, which serves as an organ regulating buoyancy and swimming in fish. Among the most sought-after fish maws are those from croaker or gulama fish. Gulama fish maws fetch a substantial price, with approximately 10 grams of maws commanding around 18 million rupiah per kilogram. In 2018 alone, an estimated 15 thousand tons of gulama fish maws were produced for export to countries like Malaysia and Singapore. Fish maws find applications across various domains, including traditional medicine, luxury cuisine, and even as surgical sutures. One prominent player in the fisheries sector is the Chinese company PT Dwikarya Reksa Abadi, operating in Wanam, Ilwayab District, Merauke. However, in 2015, the company faced the revocation of its business license due to violations of regulations, notably including those outlined in Minister of Fisheries Susi Pudjiastuti's directive concerning the moratorium on foreign vessels. This development has had repercussions on the surrounding villages that rely on the company's operations for example access to hospital, electricity generator, and fish refrigeration.

== Transportation ==
=== Air transport ===
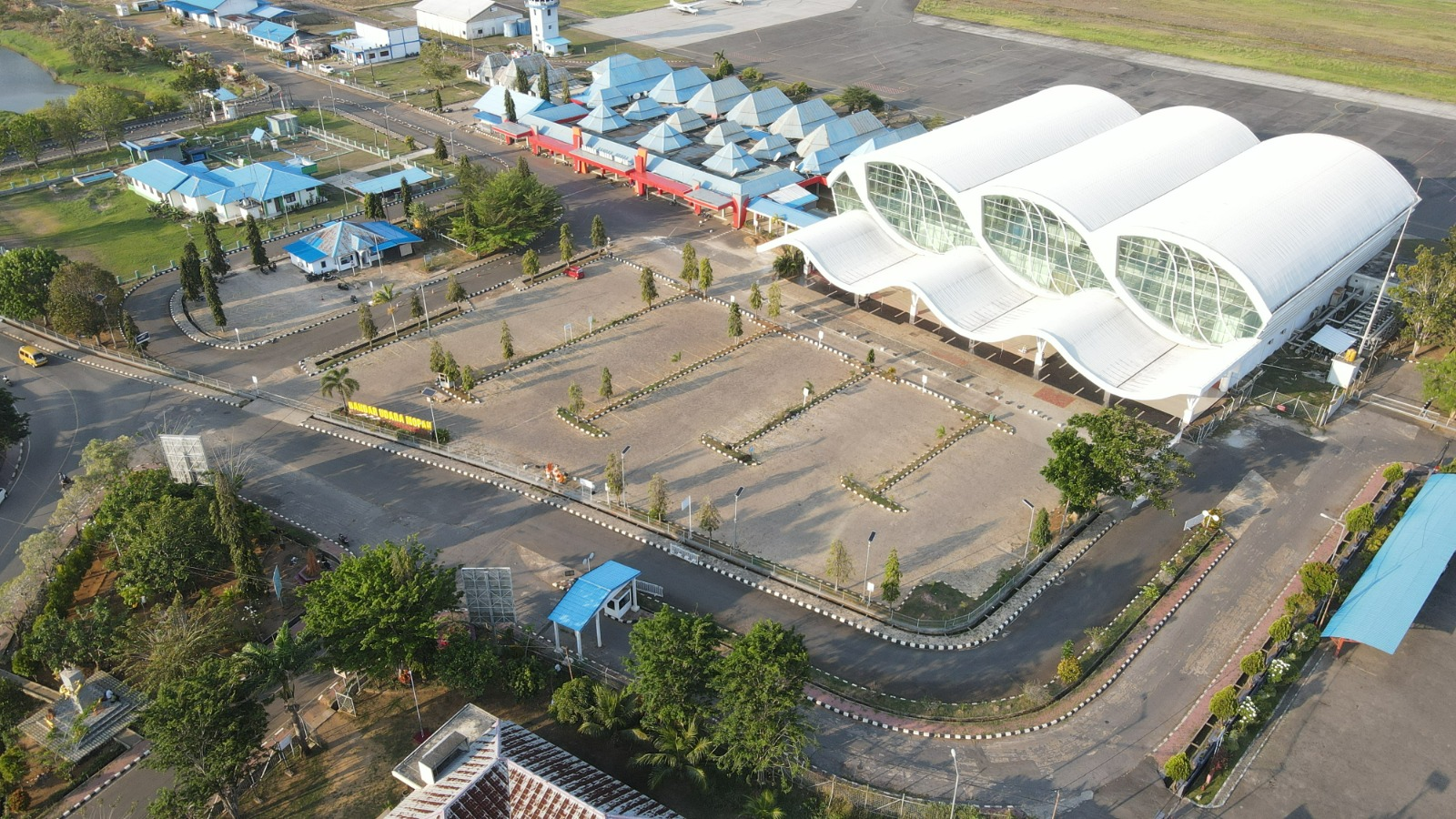
Mopah Airport in Merauke

Air transportation plays a pivotal role in South Papua due to its expansive terrain, characterized by vast distances between regions and suboptimal land transportation infrastructure. Each regencies capital in South Papua is equipped with its own airport as follows:

- Mopah Airport in Merauke
- Kepi Airport in Mappi
- Ewer Airport in Asmat
- Tanah Merah Airport in Boven Digoel

Additionally, certain district capitals have airports with Class III status, including Kimaam and Okaba in Merauke, Bade in Mappi, Bomakia in Boven Digoel, and Kamur in Asmat. Furthermore, there exist smaller airports with limited infrastructure catering to extremely isolated areas. For instance, the Korowai Batu Airport in Danuwage Village, Boven Digoel, facilitates access to the remote territories inhabited by the Korowai people.

=== Land transport ===
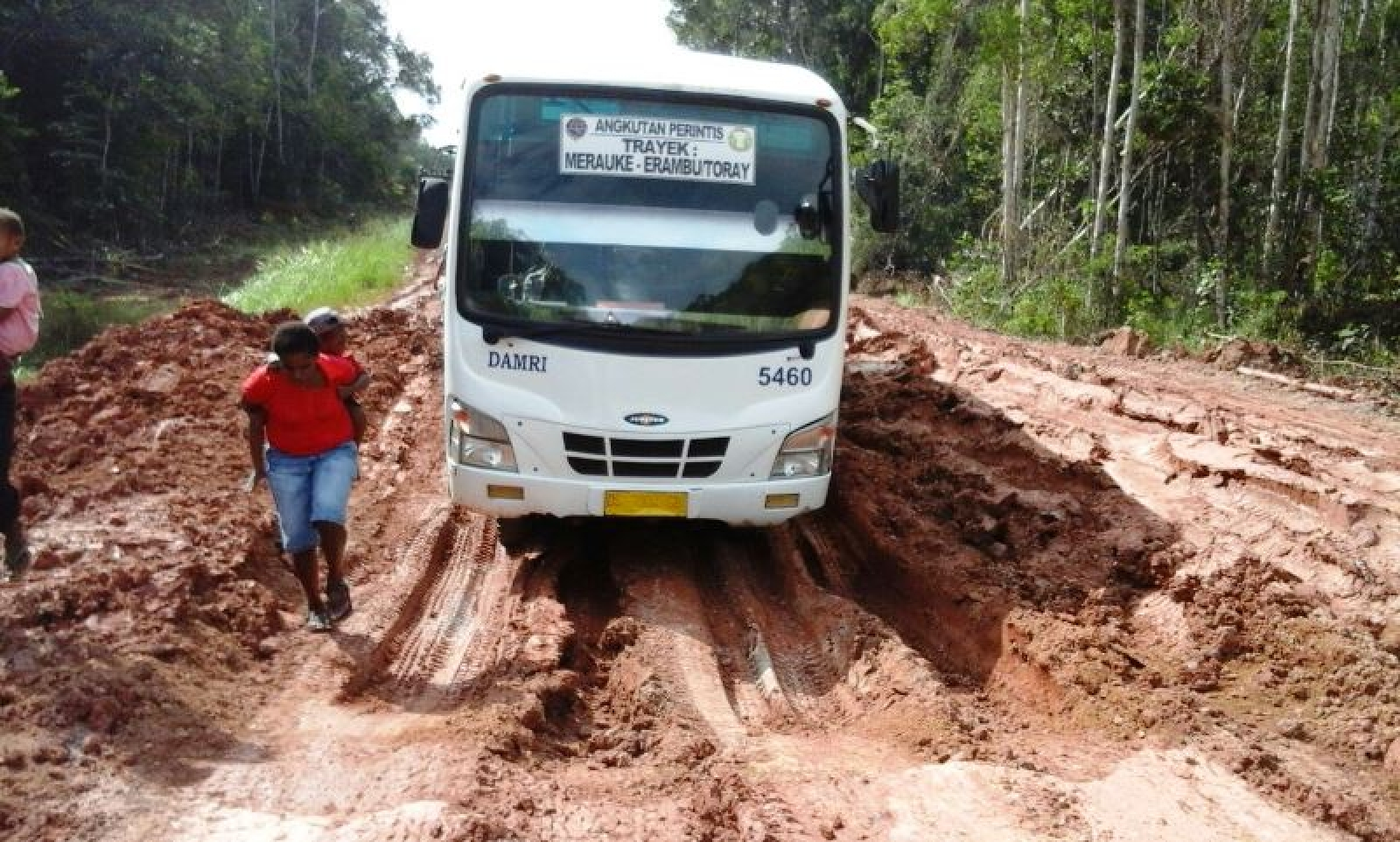
A DAMRI bus became stuck on an unpaved road along the Merauke-Erambu route in 2017.

As of 2023, land routes in South Papua remain not optimal. Among the four regencies, only Merauke and Boven Digoel are linked by the Trans-Papua Highway. Conversely, Mappi and Asmat can solely be accessed via sea and air routes. The completion of national roads across districts in South Papua by 2023 includes the Merauke - Sota - Erambu - Bupul - Muting section in Merauke Regency, which connects to the Getentiri - Tanah Merah - Mindiptana - Waropko section in Boven Digoel Regency. These roads run in close proximity to the Papua New Guinea border and are slated for extension until they reach the southern side of Bintang Mountains Regency in the Highland Papua Province.

There is public transportation available in South Papua, for example Perum DAMRI buses which serve pioneer routes from Merauke to other districts such as Kurik, Tanah Miring, Jagebob, Sota, and Muting.

=== Water transport ===
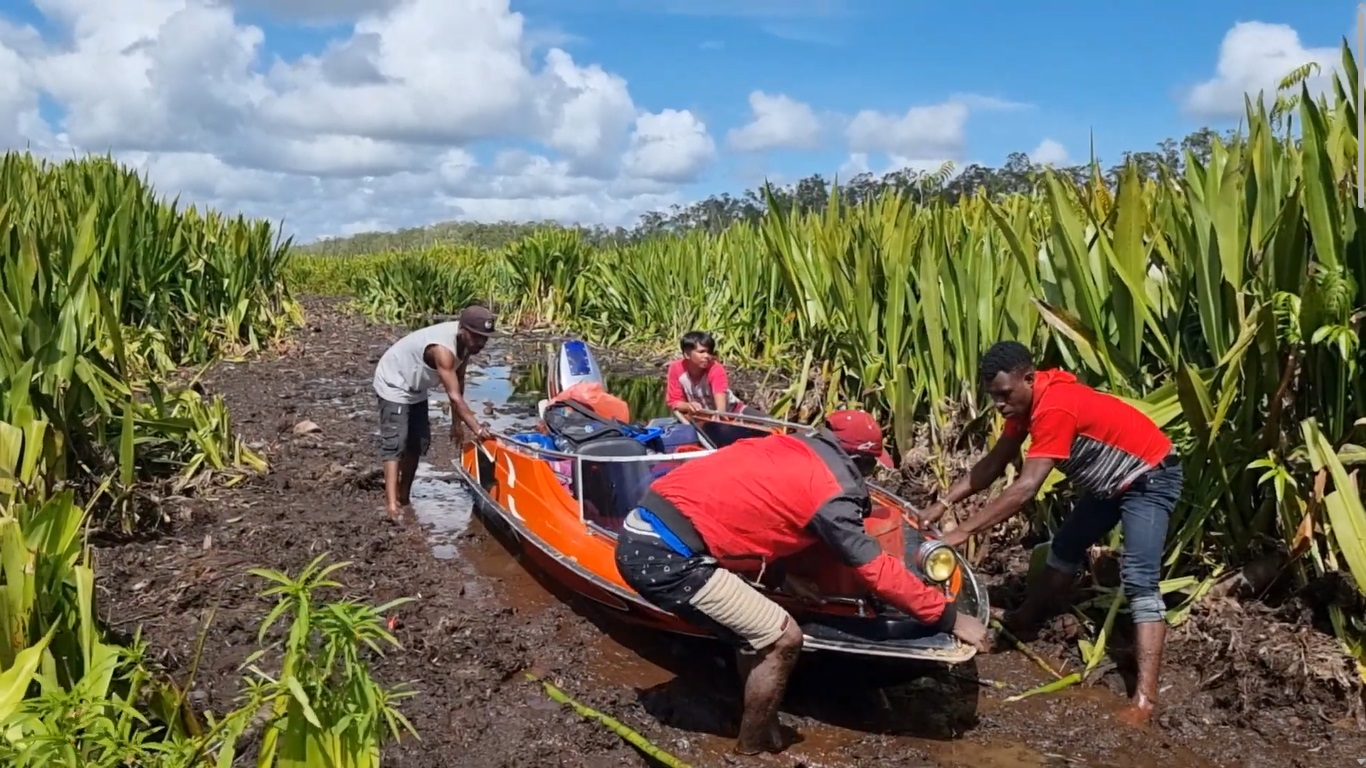
Boat pushed through a mud buildup caused by "tebu rawa" plant in the Wildeman River of Mappi

The water transportation sector plays a vital role in South Papua's economic development, facilitating connectivity within the province and linking it to other parts of Indonesia. At the heart of this network lies the Port of Merauke, the region's largest port, catering to both large passenger vessels and pioneering ships. Notable among these are the Pelni KM Tatamailau, servicing the Merauke-Agats-Timika route to Bitung, and the KM Leuser, connecting Merauke to Surabaya. Additionally, the pioneering ship KM Sabuk Nusantara operates the Merauke route, extending its reach to smaller ports in South Papua's interior such as Kimaam, Wanam, Bade, Agats, and Atsy, before continuing its journey to other Indonesian regions.

Among the districts in South Papua, Asmat Regency relies heavily on water transportation, primarily speedboats. This reliance stems from the scarcity of land roads connecting villages and districts in Asmat and the absence of a land connection with neighboring districts by 2023. Situated on the banks of a river amidst a swamp, the village of Asmat and its capital, Agats town, feature structures elevated from the ground using wooden planks or concrete. Although Ewer Airport offers air access to Asmat, reaching Agats town from the airport necessitates the use of a speedboat due to the lack of land roads.

Speedboats are also utilized for inland exploration in South Papua, such as accessing Senggo town in the Citak Mitak District located in the northern region of Mappi Regency. However, travel to this area faces obstacles due to the presence of an abundant plant species that extensively covers river bodies known as "tebu rawa" (Hanguana malayana) which literally translates to "swamp sugarcane". However, despite its name, this plant is unrelated to sugarcane.Tebu rawa proliferates in various rivers throughout Mappi, including the Weldeman River, crucial for connecting Mappi's capital at Kepi with five districts to its north. To make these waterways navigable, the tebu rawa is cleared, albeit requiring significant effort, often resulting in boats needing to be manually pushed through due to substantial mud buildup. This impediment to transportation in Mappi's inland districts prompts the local government to allocate funds for regular maintenance of river routes, ensuring smooth transportation operations.

== See also ==
- Papua
- Pig Feast (2026 film)
- Central Papua
- Highland Papua
- West Papua
