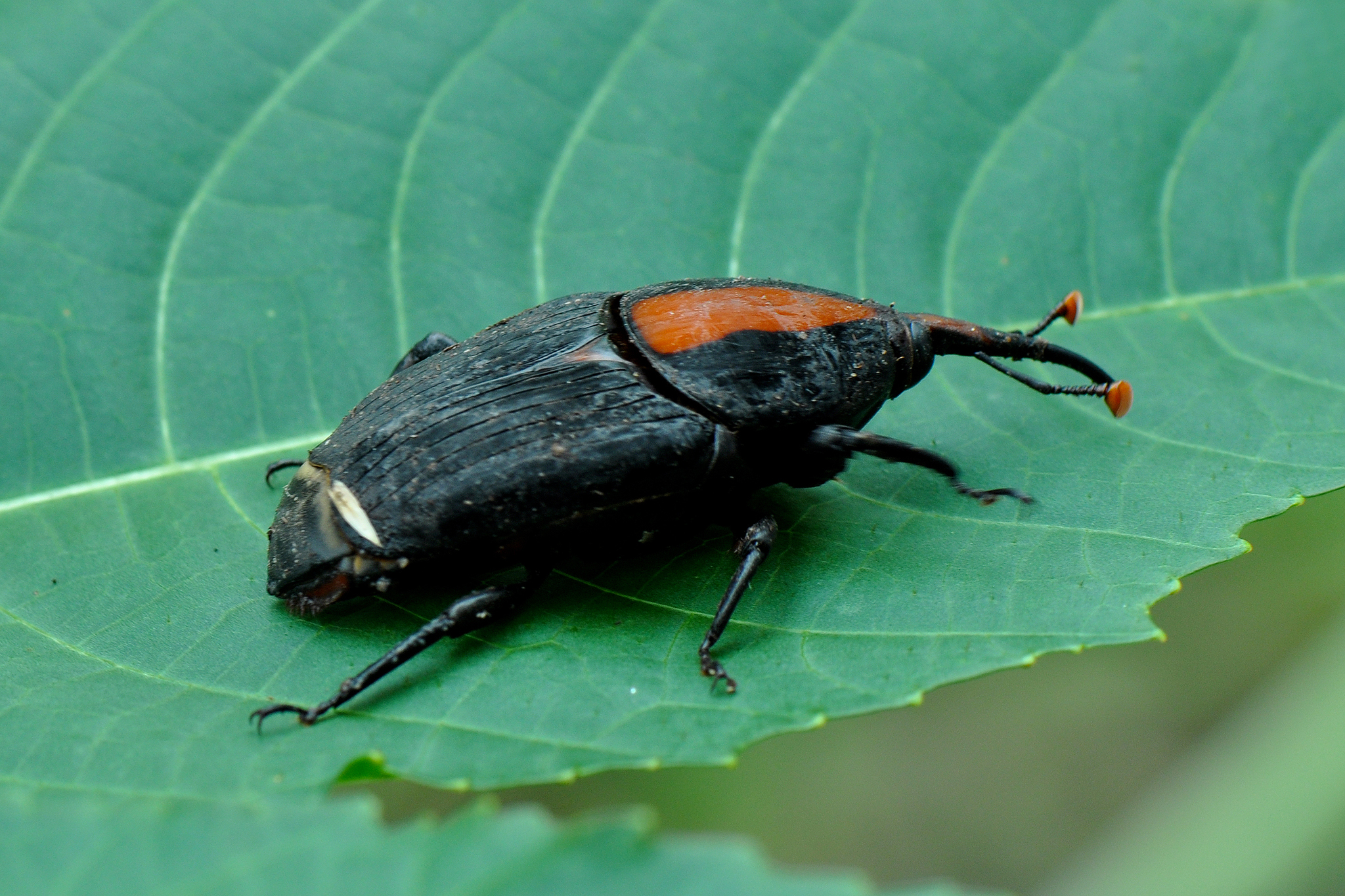

Scientific classification
- Kingdom: Animalia
- Phylum: Arthropoda
- Clade: Pancrustacea
- Class: Insecta
- Order: Coleoptera
- Suborder: Polyphaga
- Infraorder: Cucujiformia
- Superfamily: Curculionoidea
- Family: Curculionidae
- Genus: Rhynchophorus
- Species: R. vulneratus

Binomial name
- Rhynchophorus vulneratus (Panzer, 1798)

Synonyms
- Curculio vulneratus Panzer, 1798; Calandra schach Fabricius, 1801; Rhynchophorus pascha Boheman in Schönherr, 1845; Rhynchophorus ferrugineus v. tenuirostris Chevrolat, 1882; Rhynchophorus glabrirostris Schaufuss, 1885

= Rhynchophorus vulneratus =

Species of beetle

The palm weevil Rhynchophorus vulneratus is one of two species of snout beetle known as the red palm weevil, Asian palm weevil, or Sago palm weevil. The adult beetles are relatively large, ranging between 2 and 4 centimetres (1 and 1 1/2 inches) long, and vary from a rusty red colour to almost entirely black; many colour variants exist and have led to considerable confusion with other species (e.g., Rhynchophorus ferrugineus). Weevil larvae of these species can excavate holes in the trunk of a palm tree up to 1 metre (3 feet 3 inches) long, thereby weakening and eventually killing the host plant. As a result, these weevils are considered major pests in palm plantations, including the coconut palm, date palm and oil palm.

== Distribution ==
The native range of this species is considered to include Indonesia, Malaysia, Myanmar, Singapore, and Thailand; outside its native range it has been reported and confirmed only from the United States.

Originally from tropical Asia, this palm weevil (initially misidentified as the closely related species, R. ferrugineus) was recorded in the United States at Laguna Beach, CA late in 2010. However it was successfully eradicated and did not become established.

== Taxonomy ==
Primarily due to the existence of numerous color forms across their ranges, the taxonomy and classification of red palm weevils has undergone a number of changes in understanding and circumscription. As such, the information in the literature should be viewed as a compilation of data which may apply to both species, depending primarily upon the biogeography. The most recent genus-level revision in 1966 recognized two species of red palm weevils, ferrugineus and vulneratus, and for decades these were interpreted as separate taxa. A genetic study in 2004 concluded that vulneratus was not distinct from ferrugineus, and treated them as synonyms, a view that was accepted until 2013, when yet another genetic study came to the opposite conclusion, based on more comprehensive geographic sampling. Accordingly, the "red palm weevil" species that appeared in the US was vulneratus rather than ferrugineus, though the latter is the invading species in all of the other global introductions.

== Hosts ==
Red palm weevils are reported to attack 19 palm species worldwide; due to the taxonomic confusion, it is unclear whether R. vulneratus and R. ferrugineus favor different hosts, though nearly all of the invasive populations known are of ferrugineus, so one of the only confirmed hosts for vulneratus outside of Asia is the Canary Island date palm, Phoenix canariensis.

== Culinary uses ==
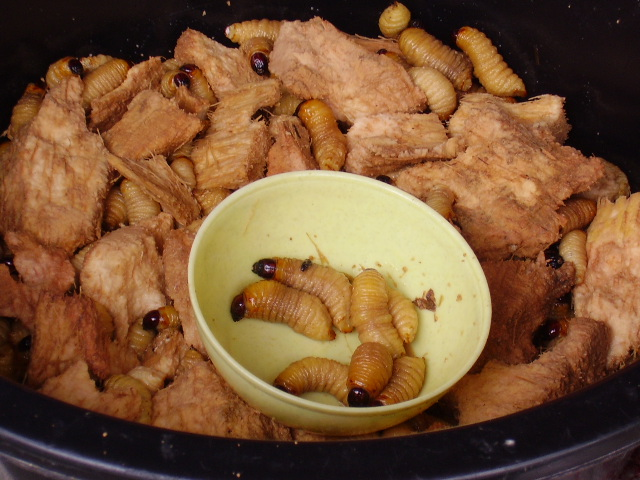
A fried sago larvae dish in Sarawak, Malaysia

The larval grub is considered a delicacy in Southeast Asian countries, including Brunei, and Malaysian Borneo. Sago grubs have been described as creamy tasting when raw, and like bacon or meat when cooked. They are often prepared with sago flour. The larvae are also eaten either raw or roasted in the Malaysian Bornean states of Sabah and Sarawak, and regarded as a special high-nutrient meal among the natives there like the Kadazan-Dusun, Melanau and the Dayak. In Sabah the dish is called butod.

=== Kidu ===
In the Karo language of North Sumatra, kidu refers to the wood-eating larvae of Rhynchophorus vulneratus, historically misidentified as a related beetle, Rhynchophorus ferrugineus. The larvae are typically harvested from sugar palm, and are eaten, either raw or deep-fried, sometimes served in arsik sauce.
