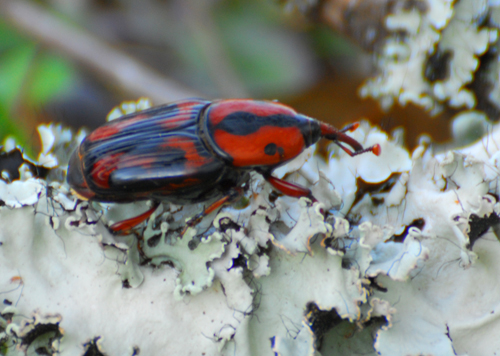

Scientific classification
- Kingdom: Animalia
- Phylum: Arthropoda
- Class: Insecta
- Order: Coleoptera
- Suborder: Polyphaga
- Infraorder: Cucujiformia
- Family: Curculionidae
- Genus: Rhynchophorus
- Species: R. cruentatus

Binomial name
- Rhynchophorus cruentatus (Fabricius, 1775)

= Rhynchophorus cruentatus =

Species of beetle

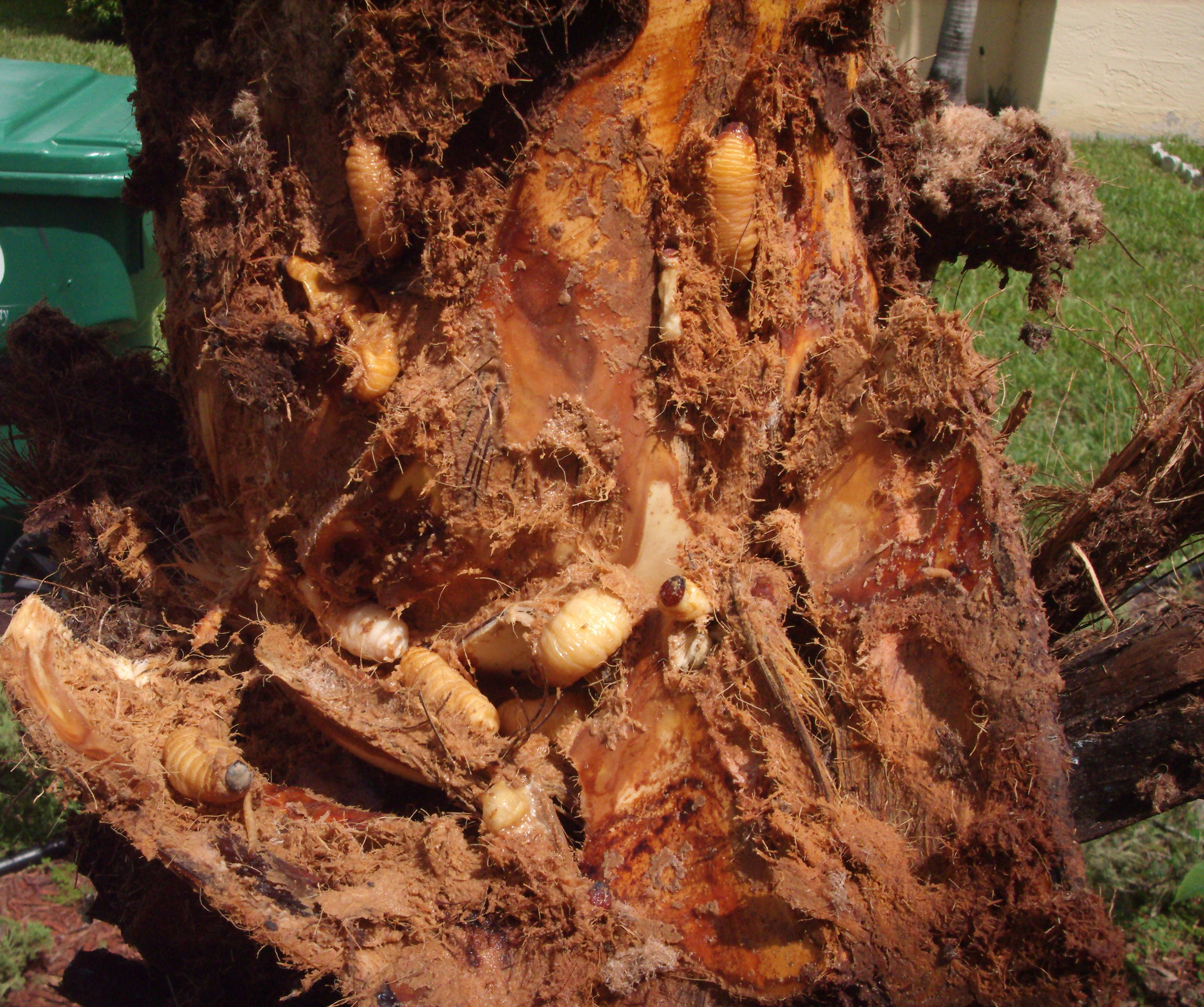
Palmetto weevil grubs infesting a Bismarck palm

The palmetto weevil (Rhynchophorus cruentatus) is an insect native to Florida, but has been found as far as southern Texas to the west and South Carolina to the north. It is the largest weevil in North America and the only kind of palm weevil in the continental United States. It infests palms and is considered a pest. Its main target is the Canary Island date palm, but date palms (a different species than the Canary Island date palm), sabal palms (the palmetto weevil's traditional target), saw palmetto (the palmetto weevil's traditional alternative target), Washingtonia, Pritchardia, royal palms, Latania, coconut palms, Caryota, and Bismarckia are also susceptible. Distressed palm trees are usually attacked, which makes transplanted trees a frequent target. The Palmetto Weevils mate at the base of the palm branches where the females deposit their eggs. The grubs then eat into the palm tree, killing it. After the larvae have turned into adult weevils, the damage can be seen, but by then, it is considered to be too late for the tree. The life cycle from egg to adult for a palmetto weevil is about 84 days. For prevention, it is recommended an appropriate insecticidal crown drench is done twice a year for high value palms.

Grubs of other species of palm weevils are considered a delicacy in countries outside the United States.

Palmetto weevil are most active in late spring and early summer.
