= Mojojoy =

Weevil larva

- Place of origin: Ecuador, Colombia, Peru
- Region or state: Amazon
- Main ingredients: beetle larvae

Mojojoy or Chontacuro is the name of larvae of different palm weevils found in the Oriente (Ecuador) and the Amazon region of Colombia, eaten as food and known as a pest for various palm species. In Peru, it is known as suri or cocotero. The flavor has had different descriptions including resembling the taste of hazelnut or butter. It is also considered a sustainable food source.

== Characteristics ==
They are the larvae of Ancognatha scarabaeoides and Rhynchophorus palmarum which are considered pests that can attack crops, destroying them partially or totally, or affecting them from the root. The weevils burrow into the aguaje tree, lay eggs, and after hatching, the grubs feed on the oily bark. It is speculated that the fatty flavor comes from this.

== Consumption ==
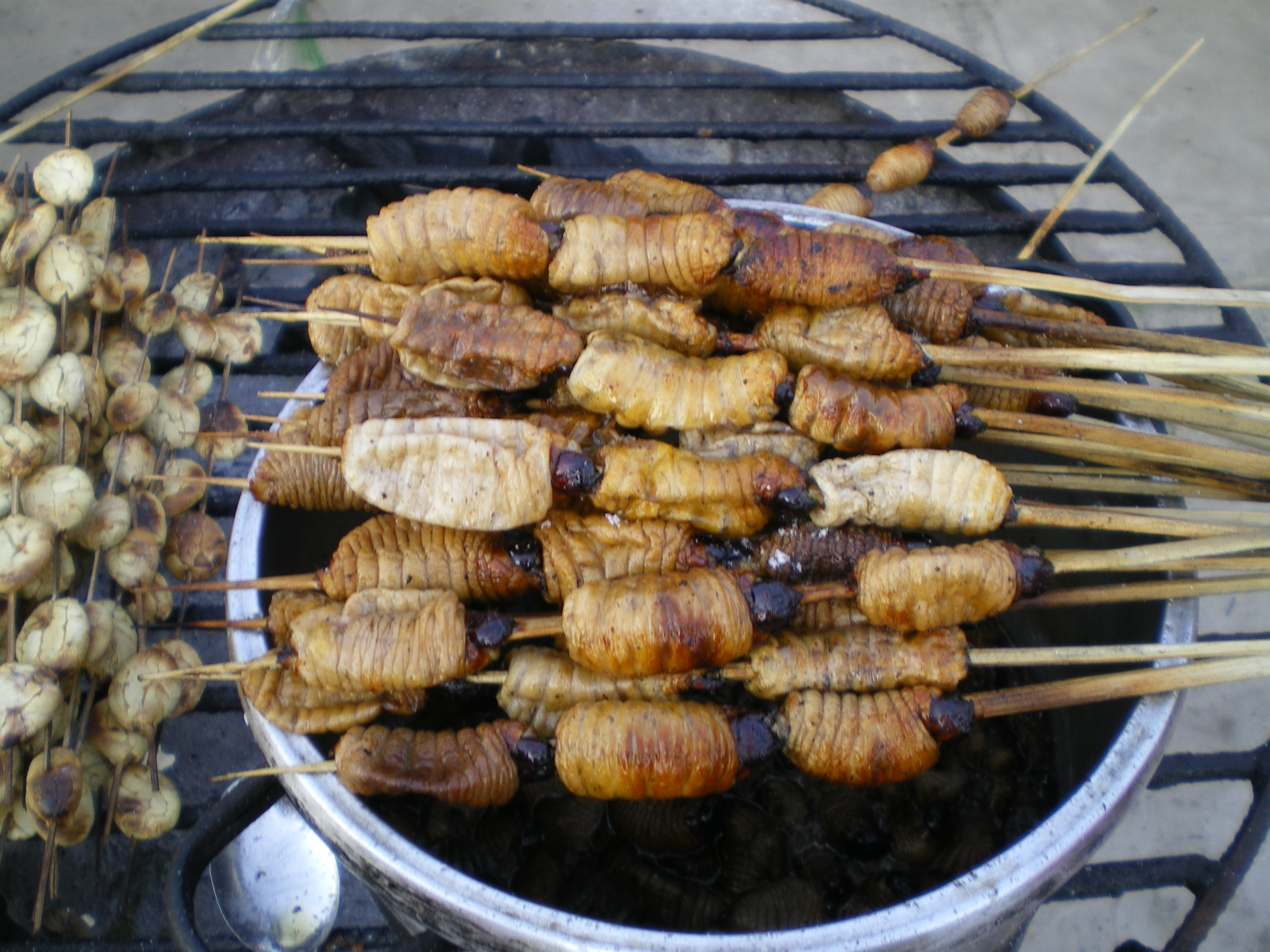
Suri served in Iquitos

It can be eaten alive or prepared by different methods of cooking; most commonly they are roasted or fried, grilled on a skewer, or stuffed with beef, chicken or fish. To eat raw, the head, pincers, and intestines are removed and the contents are sucked out. It can be prepared in the anticucho style, which is grilling after marination. Chicharrón de suri is a dish where the grubs are seasoned with salt and garlic, then fried with green plantains.

== Nutrition ==
The larvae are a good source of protein, vitamins A and E, and beta-carotene.
