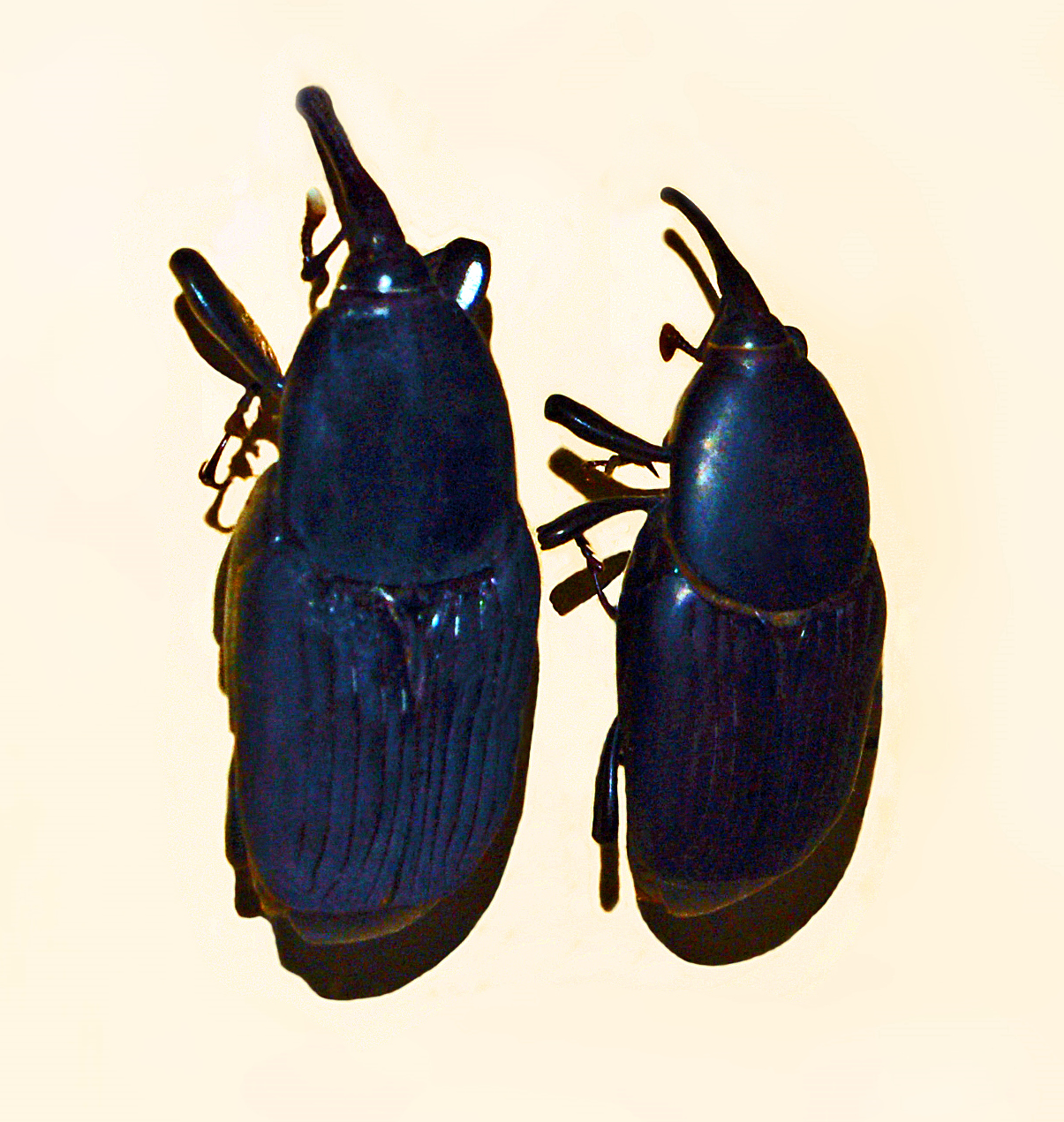
- Rhynchophorus bilineatus from New Guinea

Scientific classification
- Kingdom: Animalia
- Phylum: Arthropoda
- Class: Insecta
- Order: Coleoptera
- Suborder: Polyphaga
- Infraorder: Cucujiformia
- Family: Curculionidae
- Genus: Rhynchophorus
- Species: R. bilineatus

Binomial name
- Rhynchophorus bilineatus (Montrouzier, 1857)

Synonyms
- Calandra bilineata Montrouzier, 1857; Sphenophorus palmarum Montrouzier, 1860 (not palmarum Linnaeus); Rhynchophorus kaupii Schaufuss, 1864; Rhynchophorus velutinus Fairmaire, 1877; Rhynchophorus montrouzieri Chevrolat, 1882; Rhynchophorus rubrocinctus Chevrolat, 1882

= Rhynchophorus bilineatus =

Species of beetle

Rhynchophorus bilineatus, common name Black Palm Weevil, is a species of beetles belonging to the family Curculionidae.

== Description ==
Rhynchophorus bilineatus can reach a body length of about 40mm. These large beetles are considered a major pest in palm plantations, mainly in Cocos nucifera, Metroxylon sagu and Metroxylon solomonense.

In fact the adults lay eggs in wounds in the stems of palms. After hatching, the weevil larvae excavate tunnels in the trunk and feed on the tissues, frequently leading to the death the host plants.

== Distribution ==
This species can be found in the Moluccas, Papua New Guinea and Solomon Islands. Reports of Rhynchophorus ferrugineus from these areas are likely to be misidentified specimens of bilineatus.

== Culinary uses ==
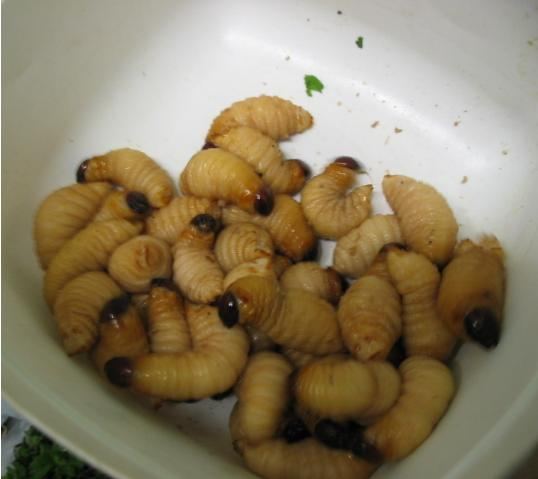
Larvae of Rhynchophorus bilineatus, prepared for consumption.

The larvae are considered a delicacy in West Papua, as well in Papua New Guinea. The Asmat, Korowai and Kombai peoples of southern New Guinea also hold the larva in high regard as a food source. Sago larvae are roasted on a spit to celebrate special occasions in New Guinea.
