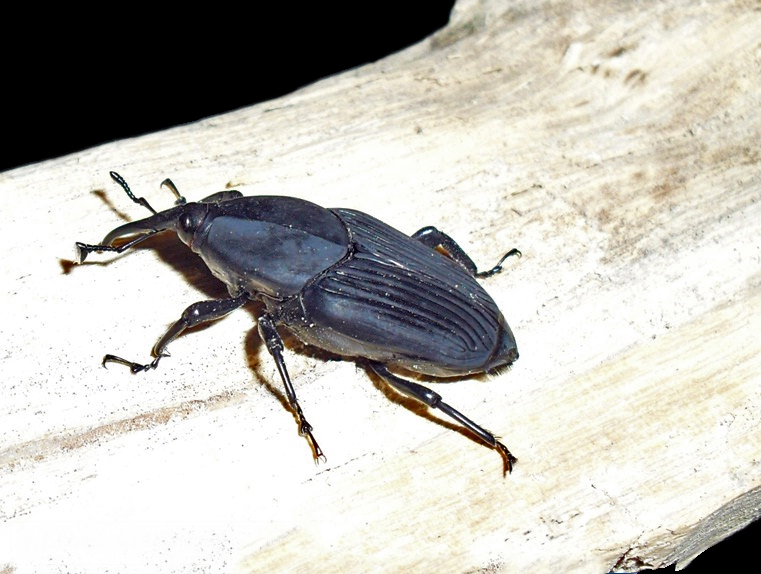

Scientific classification
- Kingdom: Animalia
- Phylum: Arthropoda
- Clade: Pancrustacea
- Class: Insecta
- Order: Coleoptera
- Suborder: Polyphaga
- Infraorder: Cucujiformia
- Superfamily: Curculionoidea
- Family: Curculionidae
- Genus: Rhynchophorus
- Species: R. palmarum

Binomial name
- Rhynchophorus palmarum (Linnaeus, 1758)

Synonyms
- Calandra palmarum; Cordyle barbirostris Thunberg; Cordyle palmarum; Curculio palmarum; Rhynchophorus cycadis Erichson; Rhynchophorus depressus Chevrolat; Rhynchophorus languinosus Chevrolat

= Rhynchophorus palmarum =

Weevil pest of coconut-/date-/oil-palms

The South American palm weevil, Rhynchophorus palmarum, is a species of snout beetle. The adults are relatively large black beetles of approximately one and a half inch in length, and the larvae may grow to two inches in length.

== Biology and behavior ==
These insects are attracted to the release of volatile compounds produced by injured palm trees. The larvae burrow through the hearts of palms, and their feeding can potentially kill an infested palm or serve as an avenue for secondary infections of bacterial disease. It is considered an important pest of cultivated coconut, date and oil palms, attacking thirty-five different species in twelve different families. It has also been documented as an occasional pest of sugar cane. This insect serves as vector for the Bursaphelenchus cocophilus nematode (Note: p. 322, "INTERACTION WITH OTHER PATHOGENS Migratory endoparasitic nematodes live concomitantly and interact with other microorganisms, of which several are pathogens to the same host. ... A particular interaction is observed with a number of aphelenchid species, such as ... B. cocophilus, which need[s] an insect vector for [its] dissemination, the vector itself being a parasite of the common host.") — the cause of red ring disease in coconuts, oilpalm, and dates. (Note: p. 315, "Bursaphelenchus cocophilus (red ring nematode) is vectored by Rhynchophorus palmarum weevils and causes red ring disease in several palm species in the Caribbean and Latin America.") (Note: p. 322, "Hosts of B. cocophilus are confined to the family Palmae, where the nematode is known to infect more than 17 species. Most palm species appear to be susceptible to inoculation by the nematode, but resulting disease severity and symptoms (red ring) are variable. The most economically important species attacked by B. cocophilus are coconut palm, the African oil palm, and the date palm.") R. palmarum carries the disease in the form of dauer larvae, a survival form. (Note: p. 315, "[Red Ring nematodes] have specialized survival stages, termed dauers, which are usually ectophoretic and use the insect for transport.") By the time one observes symptoms, the palm is usually already dead. Weevils are infected while feeding as adults or larvae, but only female weevils carry a large internal infestation around their oviducts and are capable of transmitting the nematode during oviposition. Females are capable of laying as many as 693 eggs. Eggs will hatch in three to five days, and spend seven to eight weeks as larvae, feeding on the heart of the palm. They will emerge from the heart of the palm to pupate in a cocoon woven from palm fibers either in the boot of palm-leaf petioles, or in leaf debris at the base of the palm. Pupation can take from one to three weeks. Adults will live from five to eight weeks.

=== Host plants ===
- Cocos nucifera coconut
- Phoenix dactylifera Date Palm
- Elaeis guineensis African Oil Palm
- Euterpe edulis Assai Palm
- Metroxylon sagu Sago Palm
- Phoenix canariensis Canary Island date palm
- Mauritia flexuosa Moriche Palm
- Bactris gasipaes Peach Palm
- Oenocarpus bataua

=== Secondary hosts ===
- sugarcane
- banana
- Cacao
- custard apple
- breadfruit
- papaya
- citrus
- mango
- avocado
- guava

== Distribution ==
The weevil's native range extends across much of South America from Argentina to Paraguay and north through South and Central America to central Mexico and the Caribbean (Barbados, Dominica, Grenada, Guadeloupe, Martinique, Saint Lucia, Saint Vincent, Grenadines, Trinidad and Tobago, and perhaps Cuba, Dominican Republic, and Puerto Rico). Recent finds in Arizona and Texas do not seem to reflect established populations, but more western populations are established (as of 2010) in Tijuana, Mexico and San Diego County, California (San Ysidro, Bonita, and Spring Valley) and causing serious damage.

== Cuisine ==
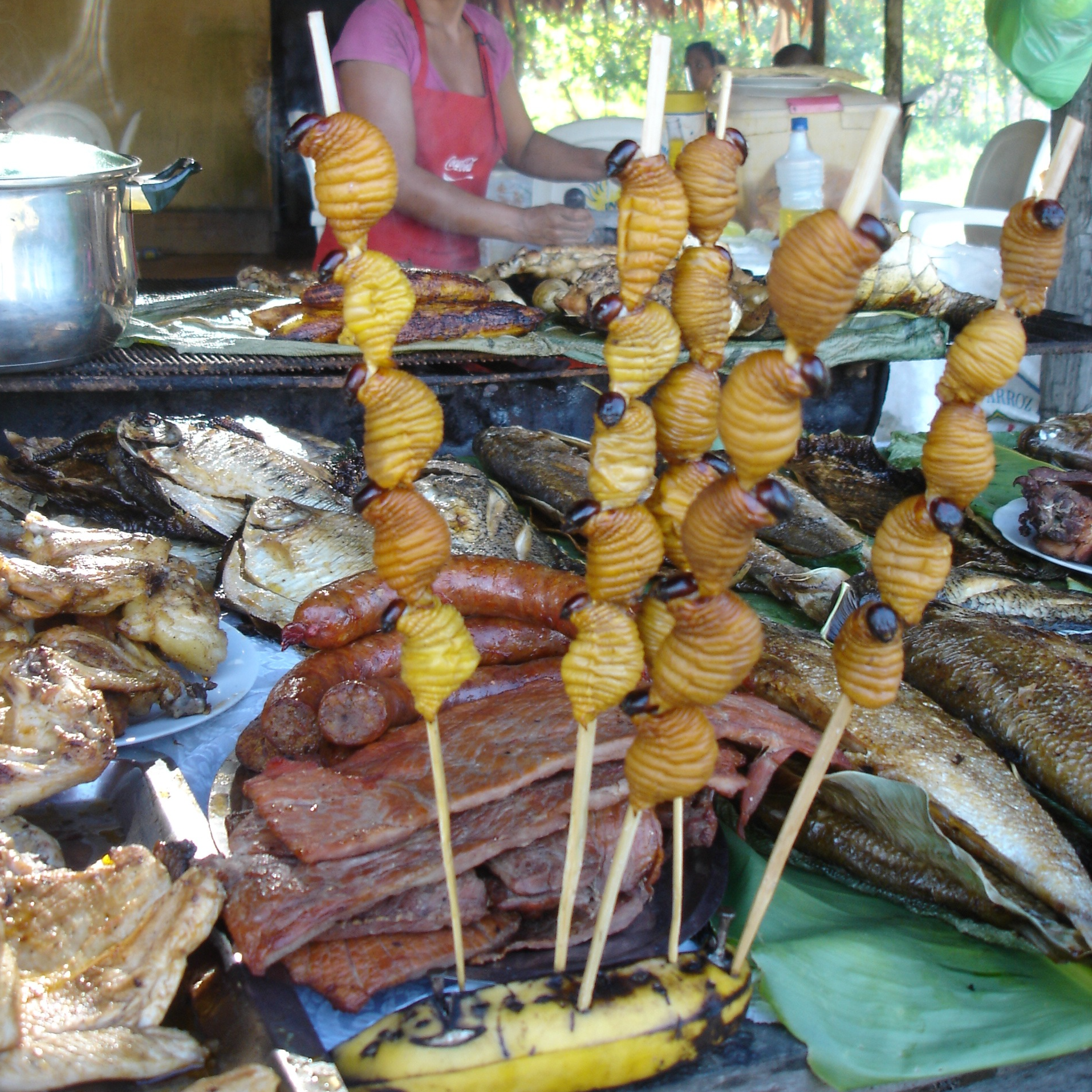
Skewers of suri (Rhynchophorus palmarum larvae) for sale by a food vendor in Iquitos, Peru

The larvae have been consumed for centuries as food by native South American populations as a source of protein, minerals, and vitamins A and E. These beetles and their larvae are known by many common names in South America: cucarrón, cigarrón, casanga, suri (Peru), chontacuro (Ecuador), gualpa (Colombia), mojojoi, mojomoi, mojotoi, mukint, mujin. and are used in traditional medicine for the treatment of cough, asthma and other respiratory ailments.
