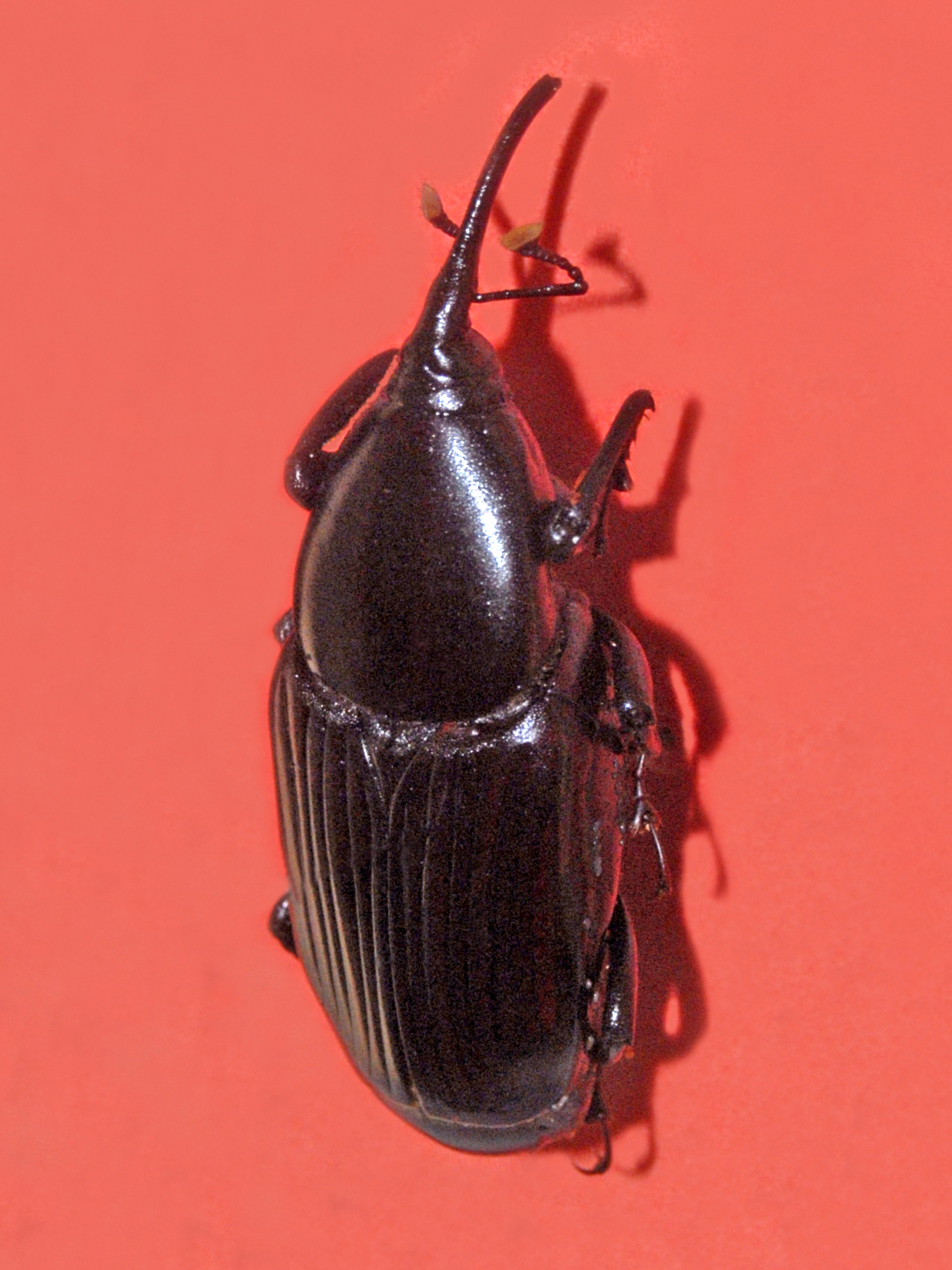
- Museum specimen of Rhynchophorus phoenicis

Scientific classification
- Kingdom: Animalia
- Phylum: Arthropoda
- Class: Insecta
- Order: Coleoptera
- Suborder: Polyphaga
- Infraorder: Cucujiformia
- Family: Curculionidae
- Genus: Rhynchophorus
- Species: R. phoenicis

Binomial name
- Rhynchophorus phoenicis (Fabricius, 1801)

Synonyms
- Calandra phoenicis Fabricius, 1801

= African Palm Weevil =

Species of beetle

The African Palm Weevil or Rhynchophorus phoenicis is a species of beetles belonging to the family Curculionidae.

== Varieties ==
- Rhynchophorus phoenicis var. niger Faust, 1899
- Rhynchophorus phoenicis var. ruber Faust, 1899

== Description ==
African Palm Beetles can reach a body length of about 25 mm. These large beetles are considered a serious pest in palm plantations, particularly damaging young palms, mainly Cocos nucifera, Metroxylon sagu, Raphia species, Elaeis guineensis and Phoenix dactylifera.

The life cycle of the African Palm Weevil is similar to that of other Rhynchophorus species. The adults lay eggs in wounds in the stems of dying or damaged parts of palms. After hatching, the weevil larvae excavate tunnels in the trunk and feed on the shoot and young leaves, frequently leading to the death the host plants. The larvae of this palm weevil are edible.

== Distribution ==
The species is widespread throughout tropical and equatorial Africa, from Senegal to Ethiopia, Nigeria and South Africa.
