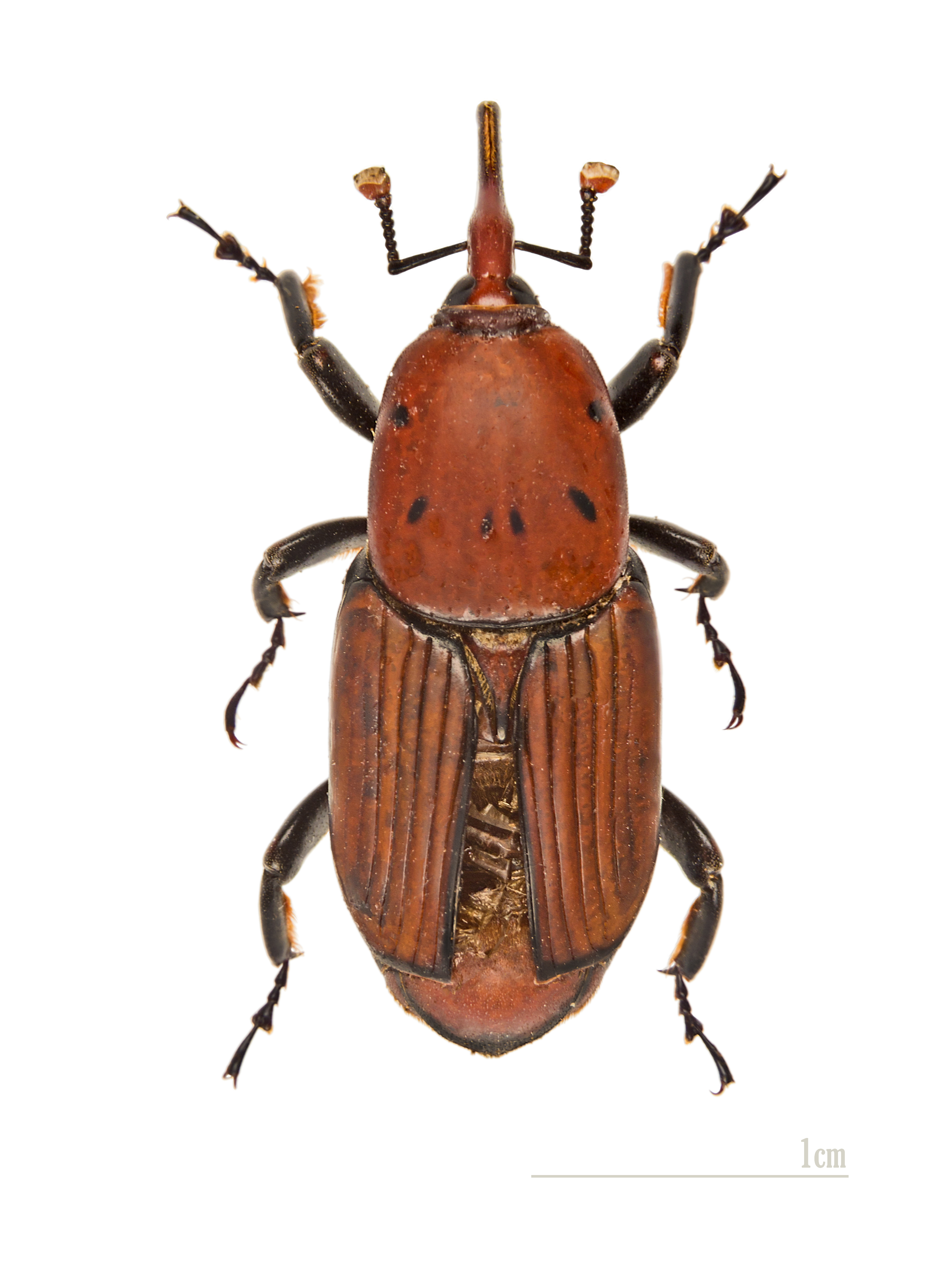

Scientific classification
- Kingdom: Animalia
- Phylum: Arthropoda
- Clade: Pancrustacea
- Class: Insecta
- Order: Coleoptera
- Suborder: Polyphaga
- Infraorder: Cucujiformia
- Superfamily: Curculionoidea
- Family: Curculionidae
- Genus: Rhynchophorus
- Species: R. ferrugineus

Binomial name
- Rhynchophorus ferrugineus (Olivier, 1790)

Synonyms
- Curculio ferrugineus Olivier, 1790; Cordyle sexmaculatus Thunberg, 1797; Calandra ferruginea Fabricius, 1801; Rhynchophorus pascha v. papuanus Kirsch, 1877; Rhynchophorus indostanus Chevrolat, 1882; Rhynchophorus signaticollis Chevrolat, 1882; Rhynchophorus pascha v. cinctus Faust, 1893; Rhynchophorus ferrugineus v. seminiger Faust, 1895; Rhynchophorus signaticollis v. dimidiatus Faust, 1895

= Rhynchophorus ferrugineus =

Pest weevil on palm (oil, coconut, date)

The palm weevil Rhynchophorus ferrugineus is one of two species of snout beetle known as the red palm weevil, Asian palm weevil or sago palm weevil. The adult beetles are relatively large, ranging between 2 and 4 centimetres (1 and 1 1/2 inches) long, and are usually a rusty red colour—but many colour variants exist and have often been classified as different species (e.g., R. vulneratus). Weevil larvae can excavate holes in the trunks of palm trees up to 1 metre (3.3 ft) long, thereby weakening and eventually killing the host plant. As a result, the weevil is considered a major pest in palm plantations, including the coconut palm, date palm and oil palm.

Originally from tropical Asia, the red palm weevil has spread to Africa and Europe, reaching the Mediterranean in the 1980s. It was first recorded in Spain in 1994, and in France in 2006. Additional infestations have been located in Malta, Italy (Tuscany, Sicily, Campania, Sardinia, Lazio, Marche, Puglia and Liguria), Croatia and Montenegro. It is also well established throughout most of Portugal, especially in the South. It also has established in Morocco, Tunisia, and other North African countries. The weevil was first reported in the Americas on Curaçao in January 2009 and sighted the same year in Aruba. It was reported in the United States at Laguna Beach, California late in 2010 but this was a misidentification of the closely related species, R. vulneratus, and it did not become established.It was reported in Uruguay in March 2022, and has since spread to many parts of the country.

Larvae of Rhynchophorus ferrugineus are considered a delicacy in Southeast Asian cuisine. In some regions, however, larvae farming is strictly prohibited to prevent the potential devastation of plantation crops.

== Taxonomy ==
Primarily due to the existence of numerous color forms across their ranges, the taxonomy and classification of red palm weevils has undergone a number of changes in understanding and circumscription. As such, the information in the literature should be viewed as a compilation of data which may apply to both species, depending primarily upon the biogeography; accordingly, the vast majority of publications presumably do refer to R. ferrugineus rather than vulneratus, as the former is by far the most widely invasive. The most recent genus-level revision in 1966 recognized two species of red palm weevil, ferrugineus and vulneratus, and for decades these were interpreted as separate taxa. A genetic study in 2004 concluded that vulneratus was not distinct from ferrugineus, and treated them as synonyms, a view that was accepted until 2013, when yet another genetic study came to the opposite conclusion, based on more comprehensive geographic sampling. Accordingly, the "red palm weevil" species that appeared in the US was vulneratus rather than ferrugineus, though the latter is the invading species in all of the other global introductions.

== Distribution ==
=== Range ===
The native range of this species is considered to include Bangladesh, Cambodia, China, India, Japan, Laos, Pakistan, Philippines, Sri Lanka, Taiwan, and Vietnam; records from Indonesia, Malaysia, Myanmar, Singapore, and Thailand largely or exclusively refer to R. vulneratus. R. ferrugineus has now been reported and confirmed from Albania, Algeria, Aruba, Bahrain, Bosnia and Herzegovina, Croatia, Curaçao, Cyprus, Egypt, France (incl. Corsica), Greece, Israel, Italy (incl. Sicily and Sardinia), Jordan, Kuwait, Libya, Malta, Monaco, Montenegro, Morocco, Oman, Palestine, Portugal (incl. Madeira), Qatar, Saudi Arabia, Slovenia, Spain (incl. the Balearic and Canary islands), Syria, Tunisia, Turkey, United Arab Emirates, and Uruguay. Records from Australia, Papua New Guinea, Samoa, the Solomon Islands, and Vanuatu have not been confirmed and are likely to be specimens of R. bilineatus, a closely related species indigenous to the region.

==== CABI ISC range list ====
===== Africa =====
- absent from Algeria
- Djibouti
- Egypt
- Libya
- Mauritania
- Morocco
- Tunisia
- Nigeria
- Liberia

===== Asia =====
- Bahrain
- Bangladesh
- Cambodia
- China since 1997, first detection in Guangdong. The model of Ge et al 2015 predicts a wide area of invasion based on climate suitability, throughout the south, north to the east and west to central China.
  - Fujian
  - Guangdong since 1997
  - Guangxi
  - Hainan
  - Jiangsu
  - Tibet
  - Yunnan
  - Zhejiang
- Georgia
- Hong Kong
- India
  - Andaman and Nicobar Islands
  - Andhra Pradesh
  - Assam
  - Bihar
  - Daman and Diu
  - Goa
  - Gujarat
  - Karnataka
  - Kerala
  - Maharashtra
  - Meghalaya
  - Odisha
  - Tamil Nadu
  - Tripura
  - Uttar Pradesh
  - West Bengal
- absent from Indonesia
- Iran
- Iraq
- Israel
- Japan
  - Honshu
  - Kyushu
  - Ryukyu Islands
- Jordan
- Kuwait
- Lebanon
- Laos
- absent from Malaysia
- Myanmar
- Oman
- Pakistan
- Philippines
- Qatar
- Saudi Arabia
- absent from Singapore
- Sri Lanka
- Syria
- Taiwan
- Thailand
- Turkey
- United Arab Emirates
- Vietnam
- Yemen
  - Socotra

===== Europe =====
- Albania
- absent from Austria
- absent from Belgium
- Bosnia and Herzegovina
- Bulgaria
- Croatia
- Cyprus
- absent from Denmark
- absent from Finland
- France
  - Corsica
- Greece
  - Crete
- Italy
  - Sardinia
  - Sicily
- Malta
- Montenegro
- absent from the Netherlands
- absent from Poland
- Portugal
  - Madeira
- Russia
  - Southern Russia
- eradicated from Slovenia
- Spain
  - Balearic Islands
  - eradicated from the Canary Islands
- absent from Ukraine
- absent from the United Kingdom
  - absent from England

===== North America =====
- Aruba
- Curaçao
- Netherlands Antilles
- eradicated from the United States
  - eradicated from California

===== South America =====
- Ecuador
- Uruguay (identified in 2022)
- Argentina
  - Entre Ríos
  - Buenos Aires

===== Oceania =====
- Australia unassessed
  - absent from New South Wales
  - absent from the Northern Territory
  - Queensland unassessed
  - absent from South Australia
  - absent from Tasmania
  - absent from Victoria
  - absent from Western Australia
- absent from Papua New Guinea
- Samoa unassessed
- Solomon Islands unassessed
- Vanuatu unassessed

=== Hosts ===
This species of red palm weevil is reported to attack 19 palm species and is the worst such pest in the world. Although the weevil was first reported on coconut in Southeast Asia, it has gained a foothold on date palm over the last two decades in several Middle Eastern countries, and then expanded its range to Africa and Europe. This expansion has been due to the movement of infested planting material from contaminated to uninfected areas. In the Mediterranean region, the red palm weevil also severely damages Phoenix canariensis. Currently, the pest is reported in almost 15% of the global coconut-growing countries and in nearly 50% of the date palm-growing countries.

All known hosts of R. ferrugineus as compiled from sources by CABI ISC are: Areca catechu, Arenga pinnata, Borassus flabellifer, Brahea armata, B. edulis, Butia capitata, Calamus merrillii, Caryota cumingii, C. maxima, C. urens, Chamaerops humilis, Cocos nucifera, Corypha umbraculifera, C. utan, Elaeis guineensis, Howea forsteriana, Jubaea chilensis, Livistona chinensis, L. decora, Metroxylon sagu, Phoenix canariensis, P. dactylifera (date palm), P. sylvestris, Roystonea regia, Sabal palmetto, Trachycarpus fortunei, Washingtonia filifera, and W. robusta. Lab studies have reared the insect on diets of Agave americana and Saccharum officinarum, but these findings have not been observed in the wild. There is evidence that the weevil prefers the 'Sukkary' cultivar of date palm to other cultivars.

The palm species W. filifera and Chamaerops humilis may be moderately resistant to the red palm weevil, though both are known hosts.

== Life cycle ==
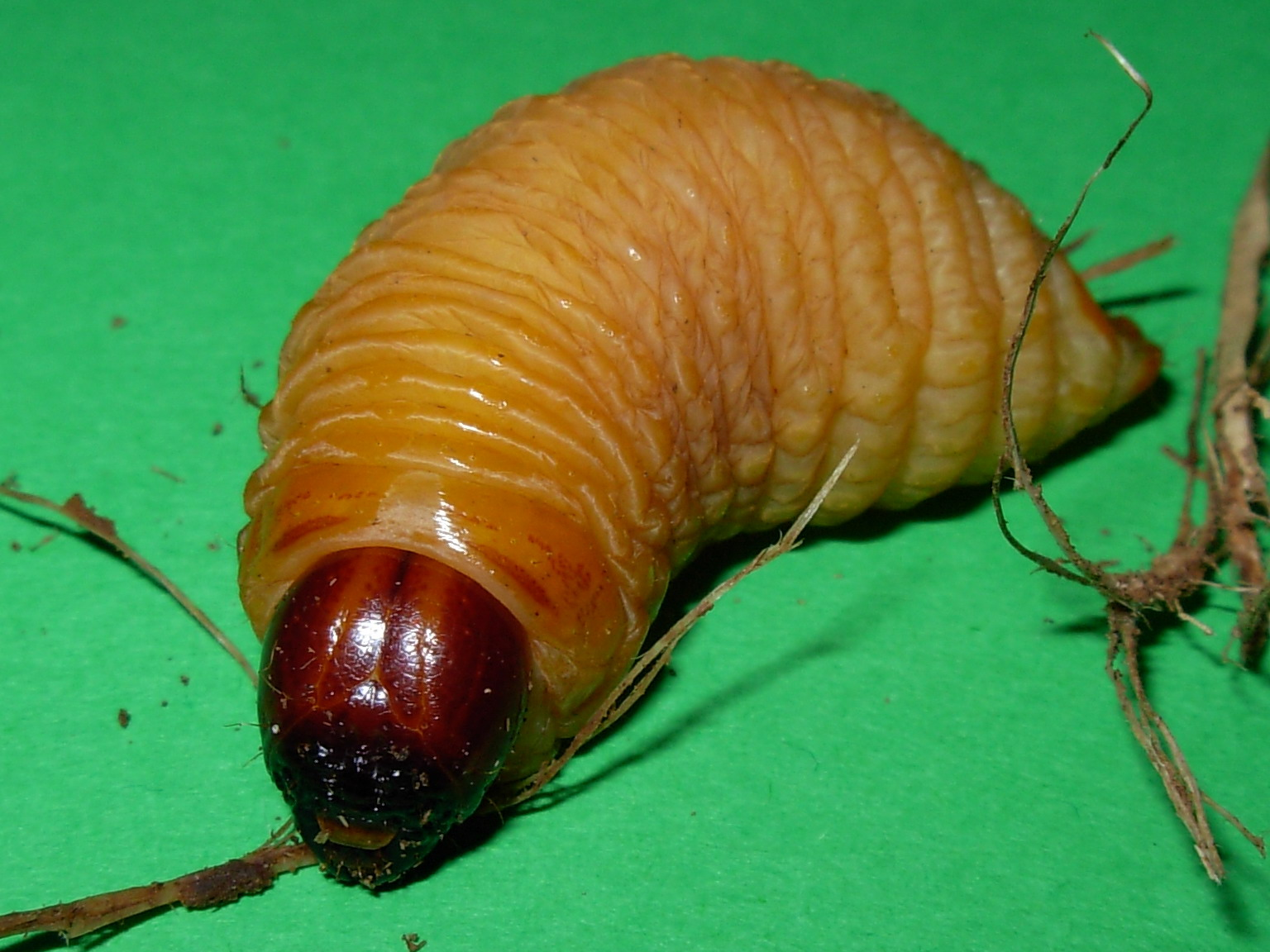
Larva

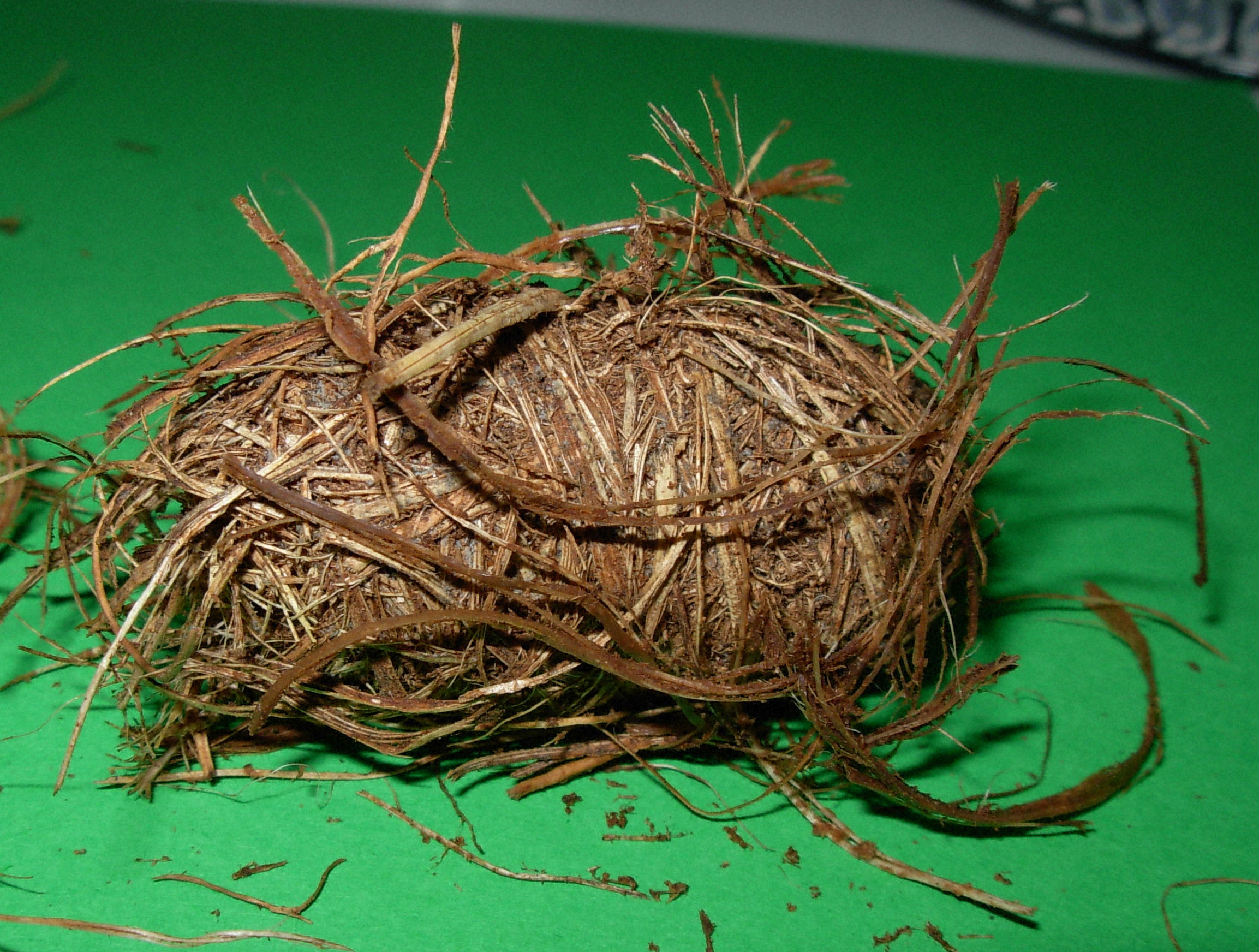
Pupal Case

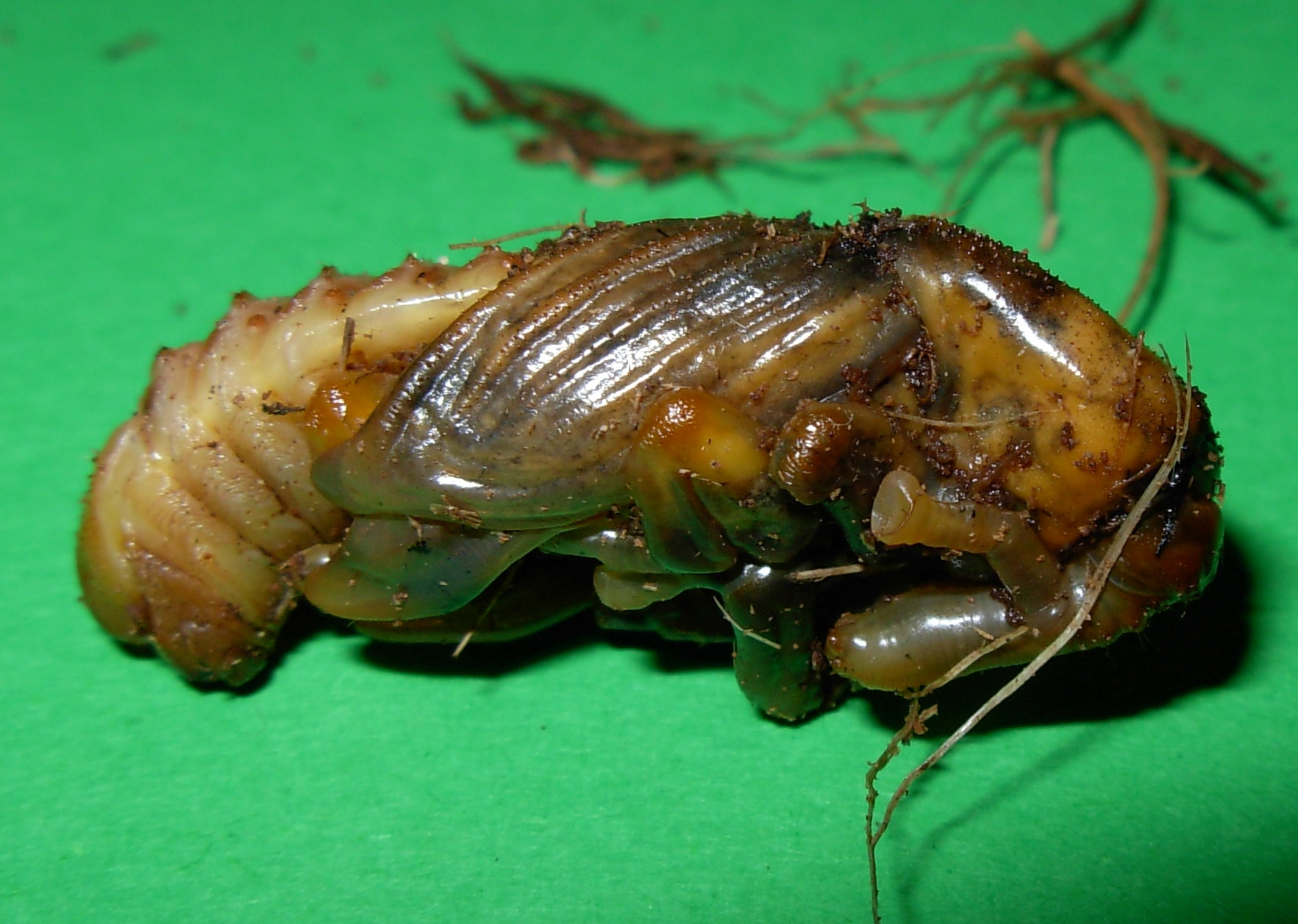
Pupa

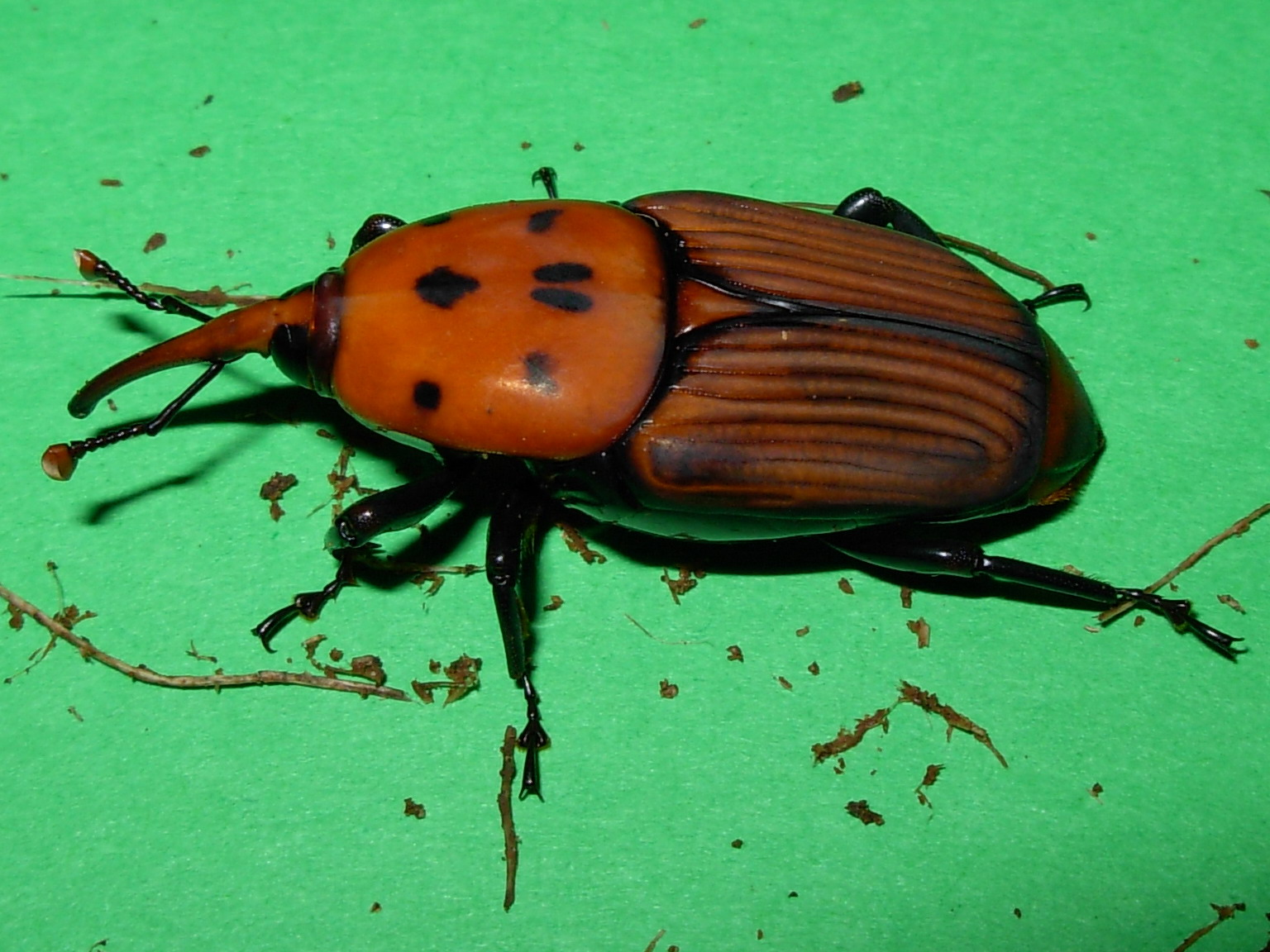
Adult

This weevil usually infests palms younger than twenty years. While the adult causes some damage through feeding, it is the burrowing of the larva into the heart of the palm that can cause the greatest mortality of trees. The adult female lays approximately two hundred eggs on new growth in the crown of the palm, at the base of young leaves, or in open lesions on the plant. The egg hatches into a white, legless larva. The larva will feed on the soft fibres and terminal buds, tunneling through the internal tissue of the tree for about a month. The larvae can occasionally grow to a length of 6 to 7 centimetres (2 1/2 to 3 in). At pupation, the larva will leave the tree and form a cocoon built of dry palm fibers in leaf litter at the base of the tree. The total life cycle takes about 3–4 months.

=== Oviposition ===
After fertilization, the adult female can lay between 300 and 500 eggs. They lay in holes they produced while searching for food, or take advantage of the cracks or wounds in a recently cut palm. At oviposition, females bend upward and the tarsi are anchored to the tissue with the spines of the third pair of legs to push the ovipositor into the tough palm tissue. After laying, the female protects and secures the eggs with a secretion that rapidly hardens around the eggs. On average, females produce 210 eggs per clutch, most of which hatch over a period of 3 days. The eggs are white, cylindrical, glossy, oval shaped, and measure 1 to 2.5 millimetres (3/64 to 3/32 in). The back of these eggs possess special 'gill cover' structures that provide the developing insect with oxygen.

=== Larvae ===
The neonate larvae are yellow-white, segmented, legless, and have a chitinous head capsule that is a darker brown than the rest of the body. They have powerful horizontal conical jaws which they use to burrow from the axils of the leaves to the crown, where they feed voraciously. Upon completion of larval development, the larva will sometimes emerge from the trunk of the tree, and build a pupal case of fiber extracted from the galleries inside the palm. The larva will then undergo metamorphosis into an adult. The larva will also weave a pupal case at the base of the palm fronds within the frond itself or at the centre of the base of the plant.

=== Adult ===
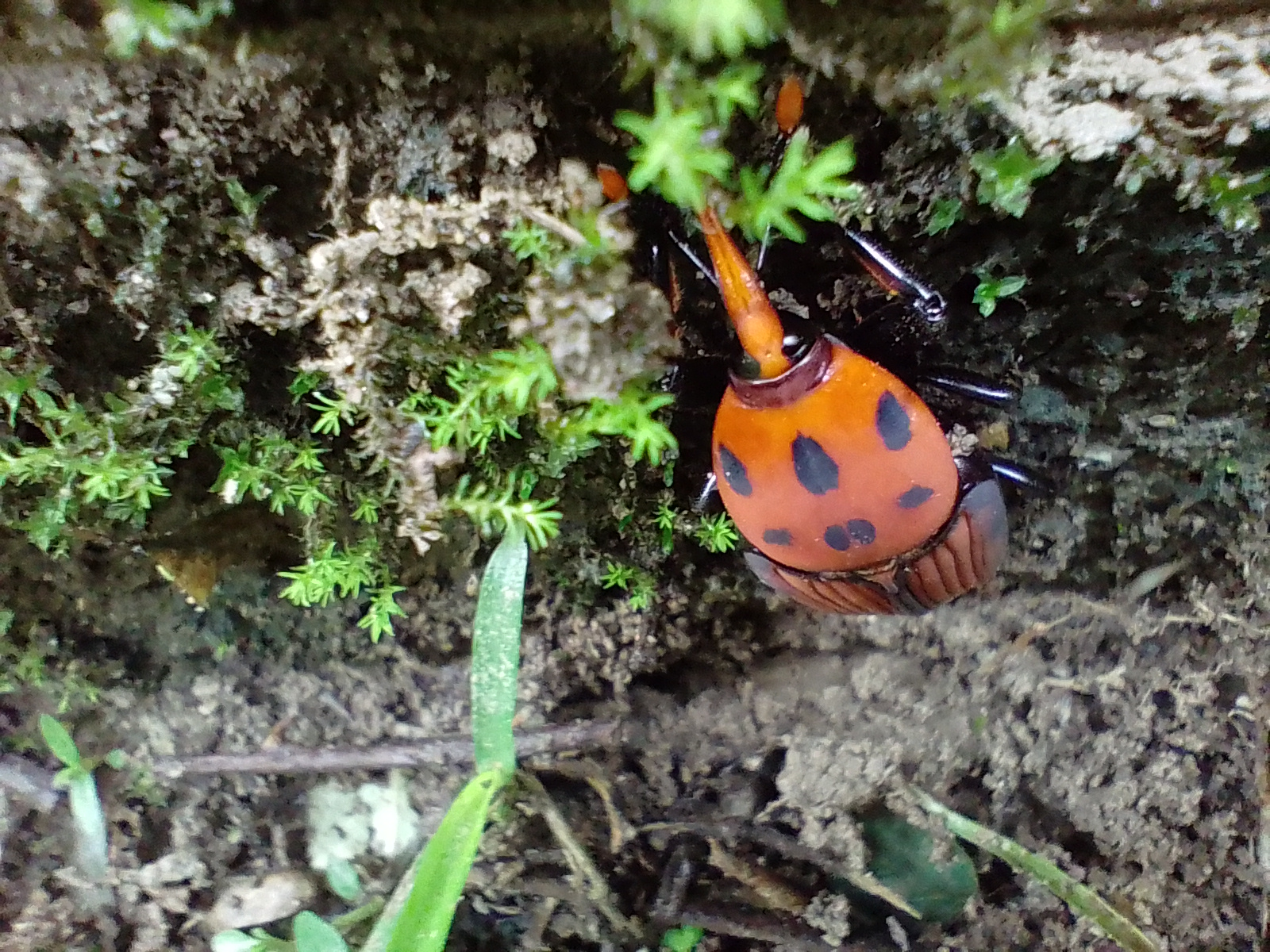
An Adult palm weevil climbing ridge.

The adult insect is an excellent flier and is able to travel great distances. While they prefer to attack palms that are already infested or weakened by other stresses, they will colonize healthy palms.

== Predators, diseases, and parasites ==
R. ferrugineus is predated by Chelisoches morio, infected by a cytoplasmic polyhedrosis virus and Metarhizium pingshaense, and parasitized by Heterorhabditis indicus, Hypoaspis spp., Praecocilenchus ferruginophorus, Scolia erratica, Steinernema carpocapsae, and Steinernema riobravis.

== Behaviour ==
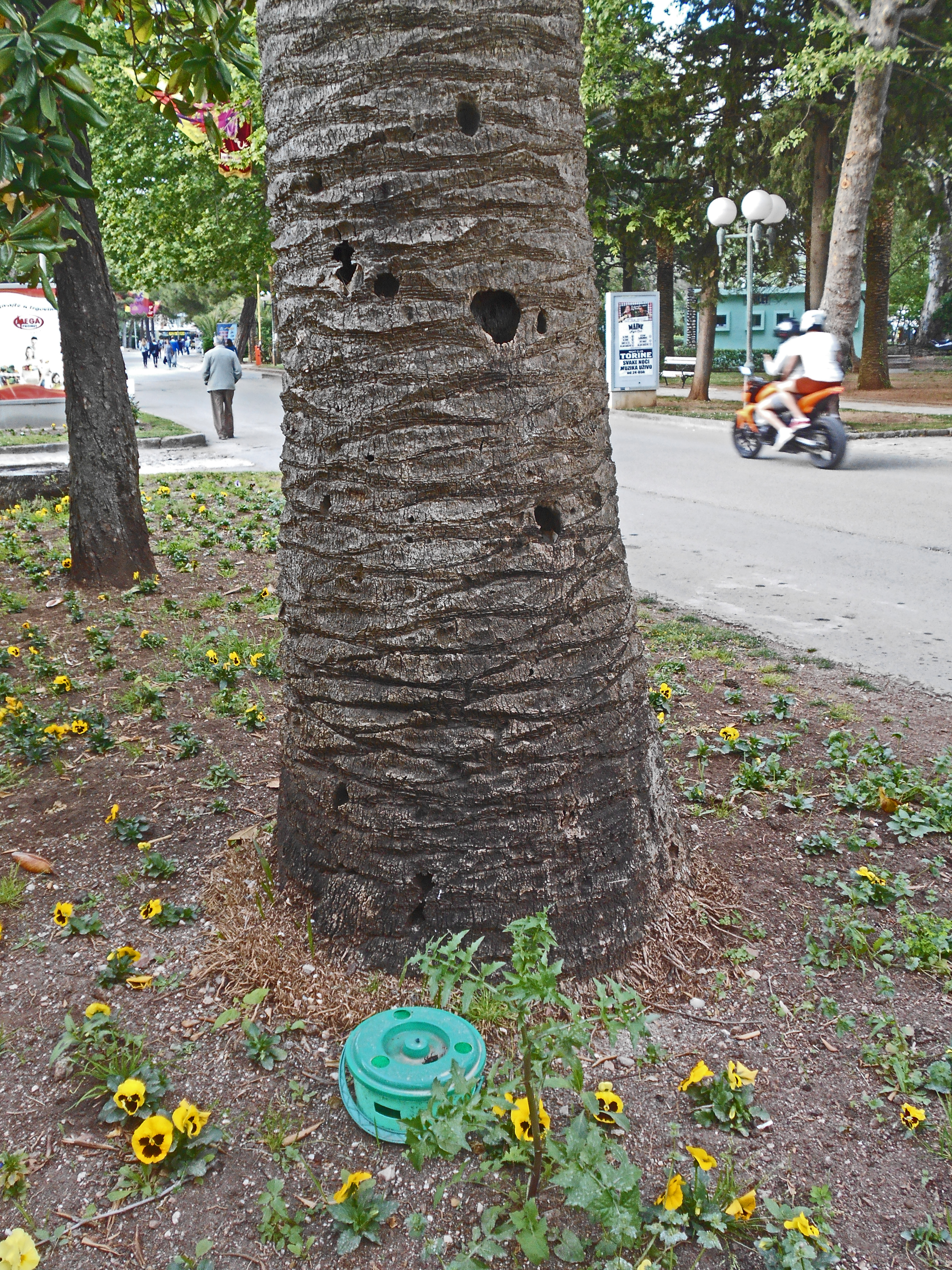
Traps for attracting and destroying (Budva, Montenegro)

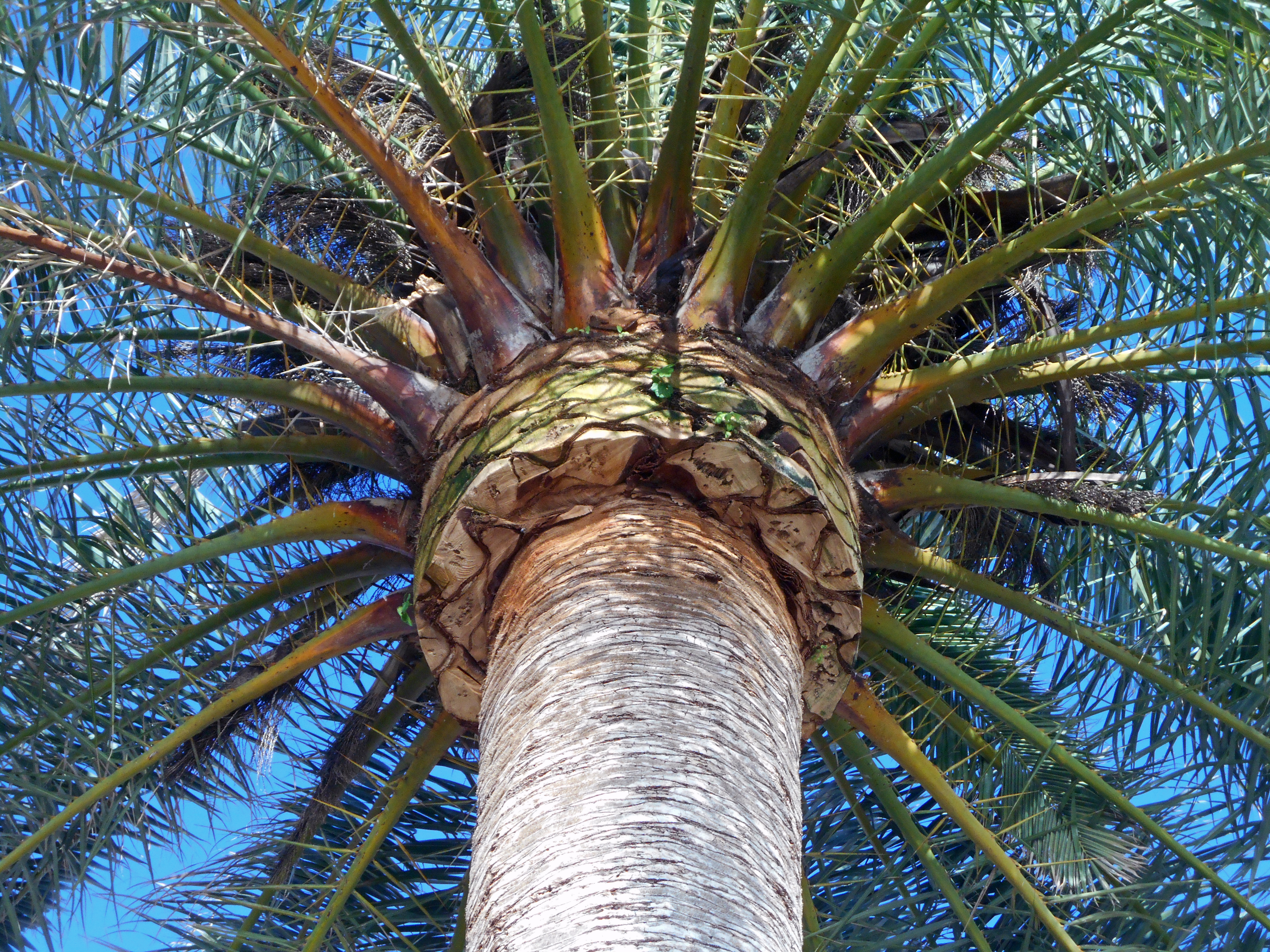
Hard pruning as a way of fighting

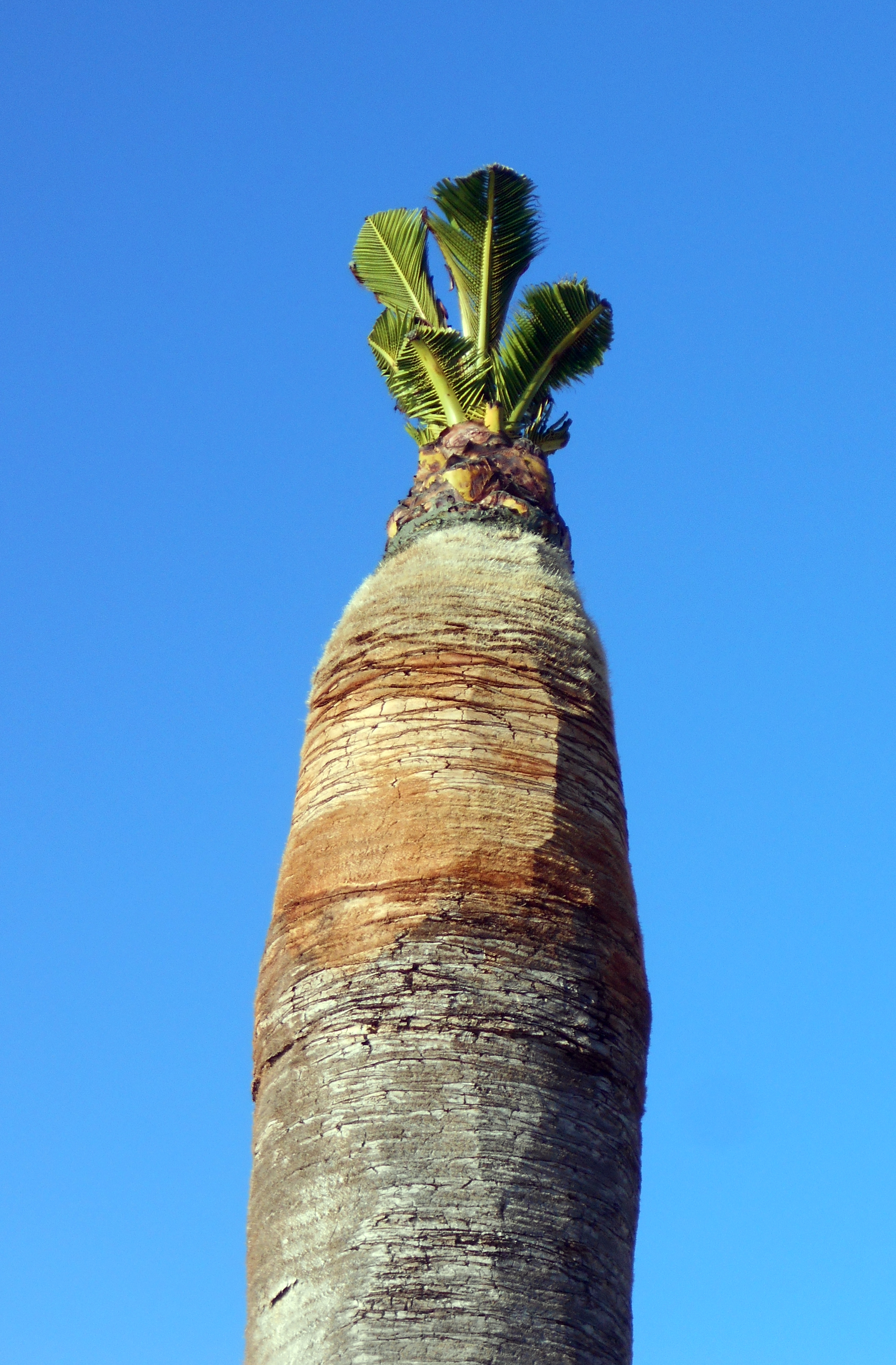
Treated phoenix palm, which is recovering after being attacked

Studies show that this insect is attracted by ethyl acetate, 2-methoxy.4.vinylphenol, gamma-nonanoic lactone, 4SSS-ferrugineol, 50H and 4me-9-5Kt.

== Symptoms of infestation ==
The infestation of the pest can result in yellowing and wilting of palms, that may lead to the death of the affected plant. The crown wilts first, and lower leaves will follow, due to damage to vascular tissue. Major symptoms such as crown loss or leaf wilt are usually only visible long after the palm has become infested. Secondary infections of opportunistic bacteria and fungi may occur within damaged tissues, accelerating decline. By the time these external symptoms are observed, the damage is usually sufficient to kill the tree, and the infestation may have been present for six months or longer. In high-density infestations, sounds of the larvae burrowing and chewing can be heard by placing one's ear to the trunk of the palm. Recent research has been conducted using electronic listening devices or dogs trained to recognize the scent of weevils or palm decay to detect infestations at low densities earlier in the process.

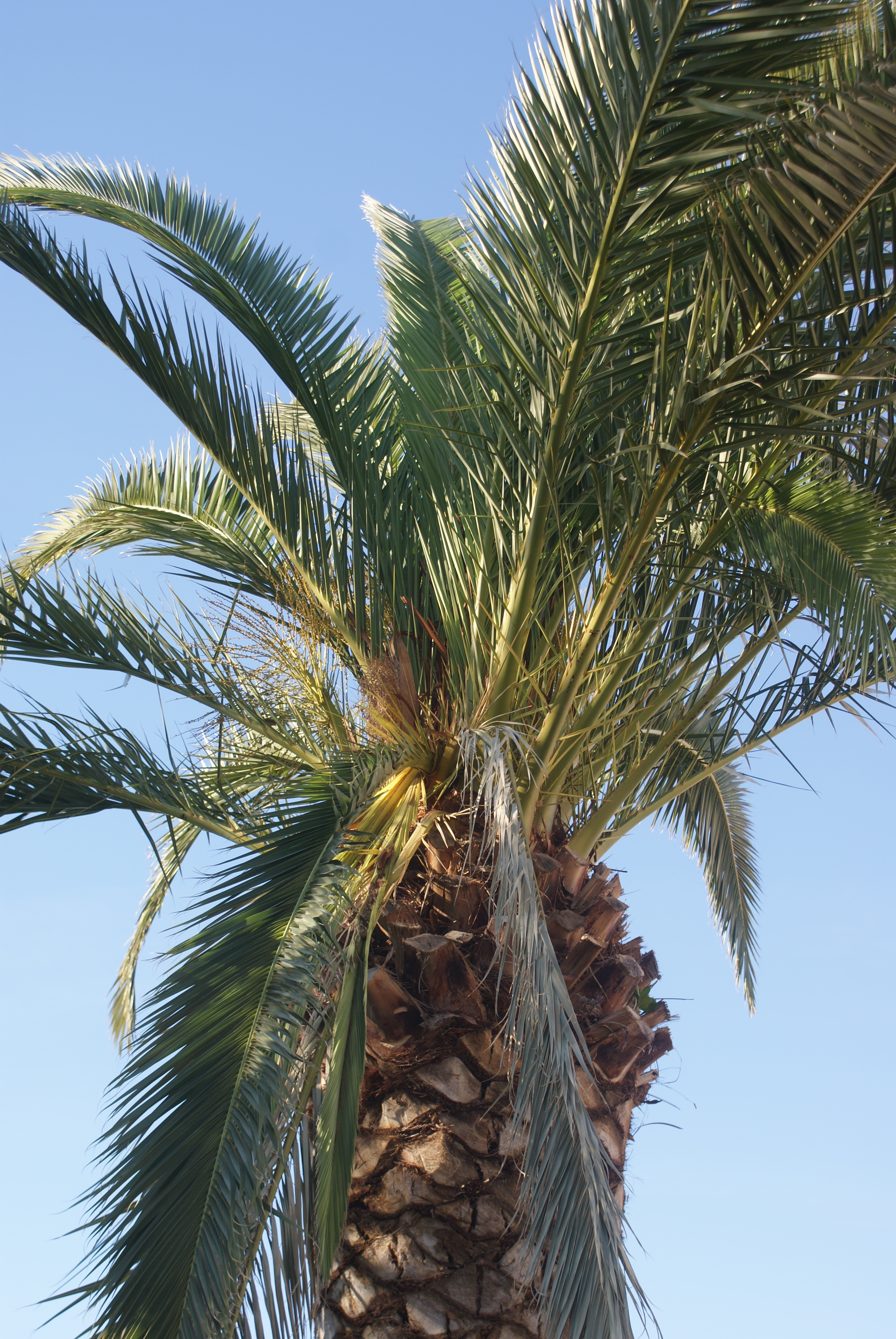
Canary Island date palm, with first obvious infestation signs

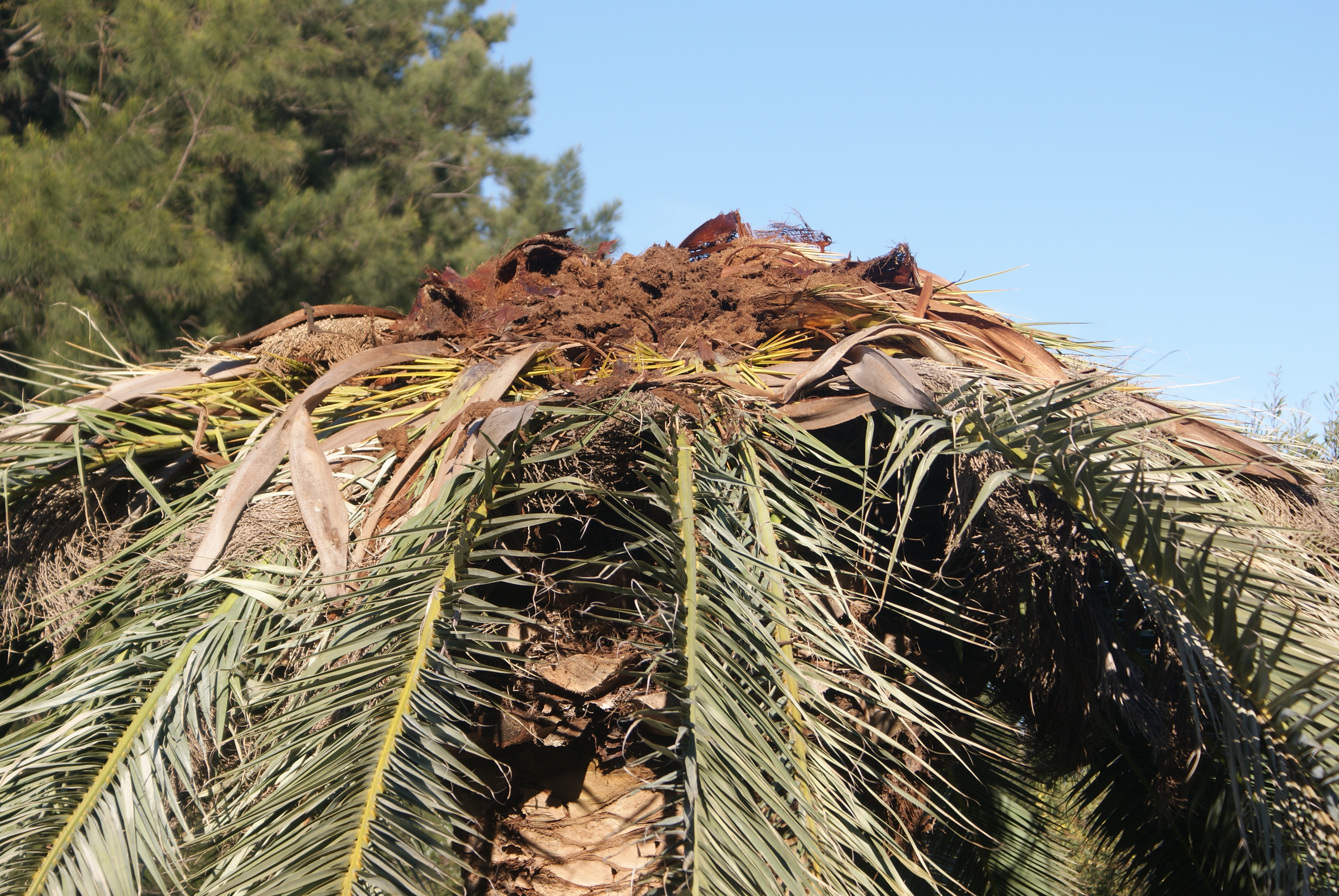
Destroyed crown of CIDP

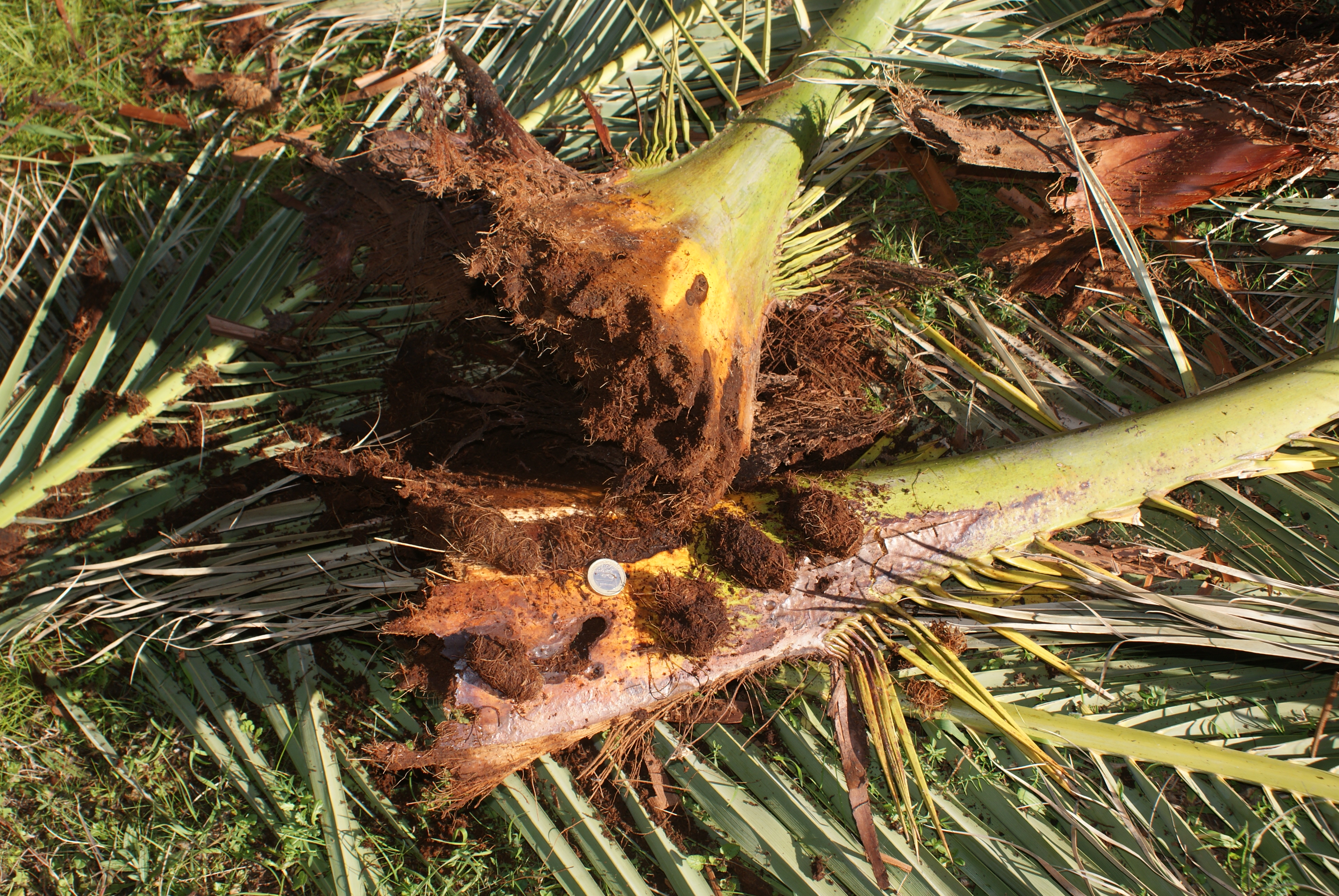
Bases of palm leaves fallen from the crown of the tree, with burrows and extracted pupal cases

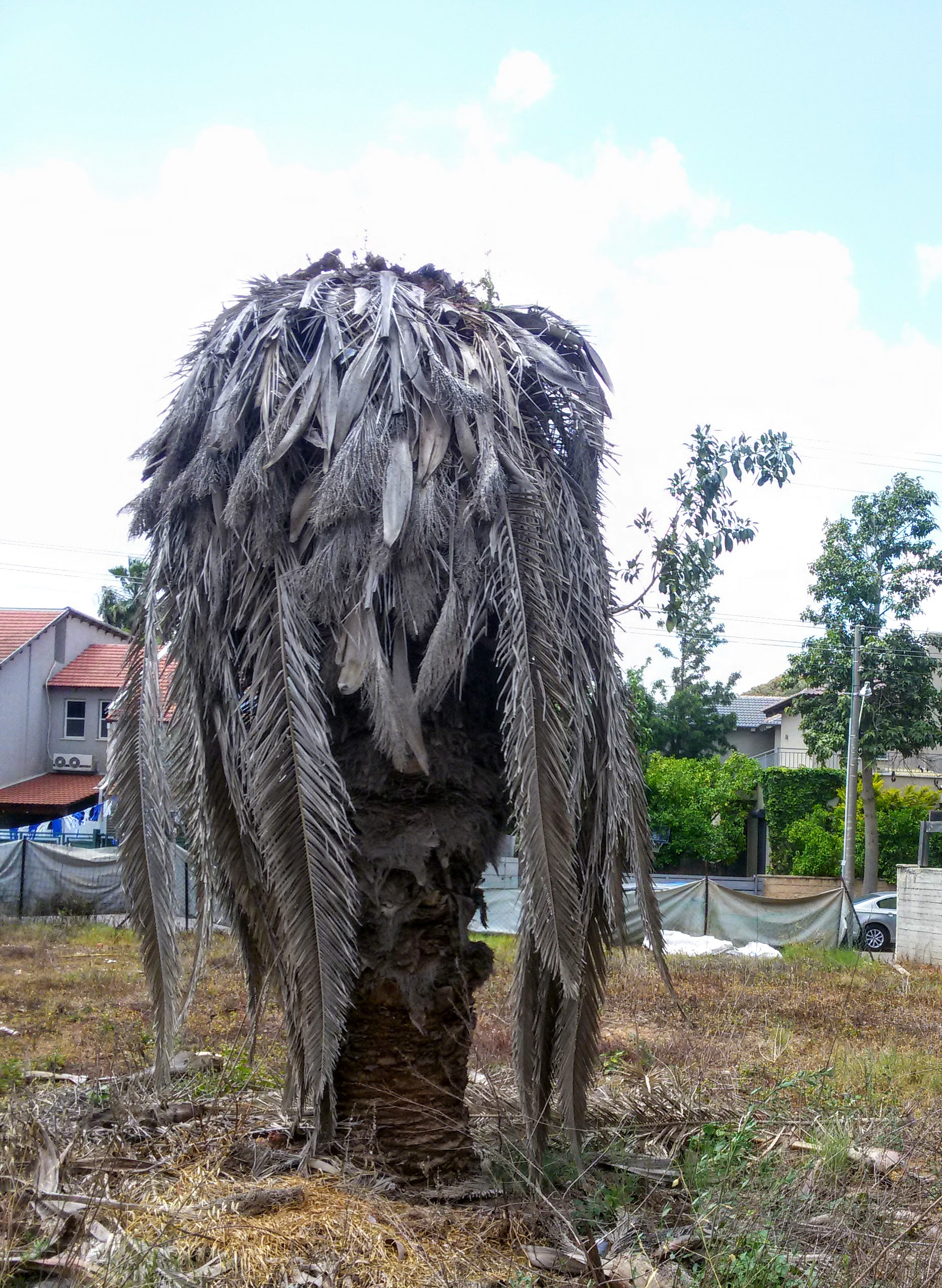
Date palm killed by weevils

== Early detection ==
Because the external symptoms of red palm weevil infestation, such as crown wilt or leaf collapse, generally become visible only once an infestation is advanced and the vascular tissue of the palm is already severely damaged, several technologies have been developed to detect the pest before symptoms appear, primarily through acoustic and seismic monitoring of larval feeding activity inside the trunk.

One such approach uses seismic sensors. A small metal probe, a few centimetres long, is inserted into the palm trunk or crown, where it picks up mechanical vibrations transmitted through the plant tissue. As red palm weevil larvae feed, the repeated movement of their mandibles against the internal fibres generates a distinctive vibrational signal, which the device converts into an electronic reading. Readings are transmitted, typically over a short-range wireless link to a gateway and then via a cellular network, to a cloud-based platform, where machine-learning classifiers (statistical models such as hidden Markov models have been used for this purpose) filter out environmental and mechanical background noise and identify the frequency and temporal pattern characteristic of larval feeding, distinguishing it from wind, traffic, or other insects. Because the signal can be picked up while the larval population inside the palm is still small, this method can flag an infestation months before external symptoms appear, when treatment is more likely to succeed.

Seismic sensor systems of this kind (marketed, for example, as IoTree by the company Agrint) have been deployed at increasing scale in Mediterranean and Persian Gulf date palm-growing countries. In Israel, a 2024 study found sensors installed on about 27% of the roughly 36,000 date palms in public urban areas and about 25% of plantation palms of susceptible age (4–14 years), with widespread adoption dating from 2020.

The same seismic-sensor technology has been used in Uruguay, where R. ferrugineus was first detected in 2022, for early detection in both cultivated Canary Island date palms (Phoenix canariensis) and the native Butia odorata.{2022}

== Control ==
The main control method is through the application of a systemic insecticide. Insecticide is usually applied through a funnel about 5 centimetres (2 in) above the infested area of the trunk. The red palm weevil can be monitored using pheromone lures and alternative forms of control use field sanitation and mass trapping with traps baited with pheromone and plant derived semiochemicals. New alternative technologies using semiochemicals and bioinsecticides are being developed to attract the weevils to a point source and kill them. Another management technique is to drench the base of palm fronds with the entomopathogenic fungus Metarhizium robertsii (syn. M. anisopliae, Entomophthora anisopliae), or Beauveria bassiana. An Italian company claims to have developed a microwave collar that can be used to sterilize individual trees. For early detection, bioacoustic analysis may be implemented by inserting a sensitive microphone into the tree and recording any produced sounds. These sounds are analyzed by digital signal processing and artificial intelligence to decide whether they are generated by palm weevils.

Palms' natural defense against this weevil is understudied. RNA interference (RNAi, a kind of gene silencing) is a recently discovered defense system in many host-pathogen systems. RNAi shows promise as a breeding target when breeding palm for RPW resistance.

== Prevention ==
As the weevil prefers to lay its eggs in softer tissues, avoiding mechanical damage to plants can help to reduce infestation. Tarring wounds after pruning a plant of dead or old leaves can also reduce the probability of infestation. The movement of plant material such as husks, dead leaves, or untreated coir from infested to uninfested areas is not recommended.

== Culinary uses ==
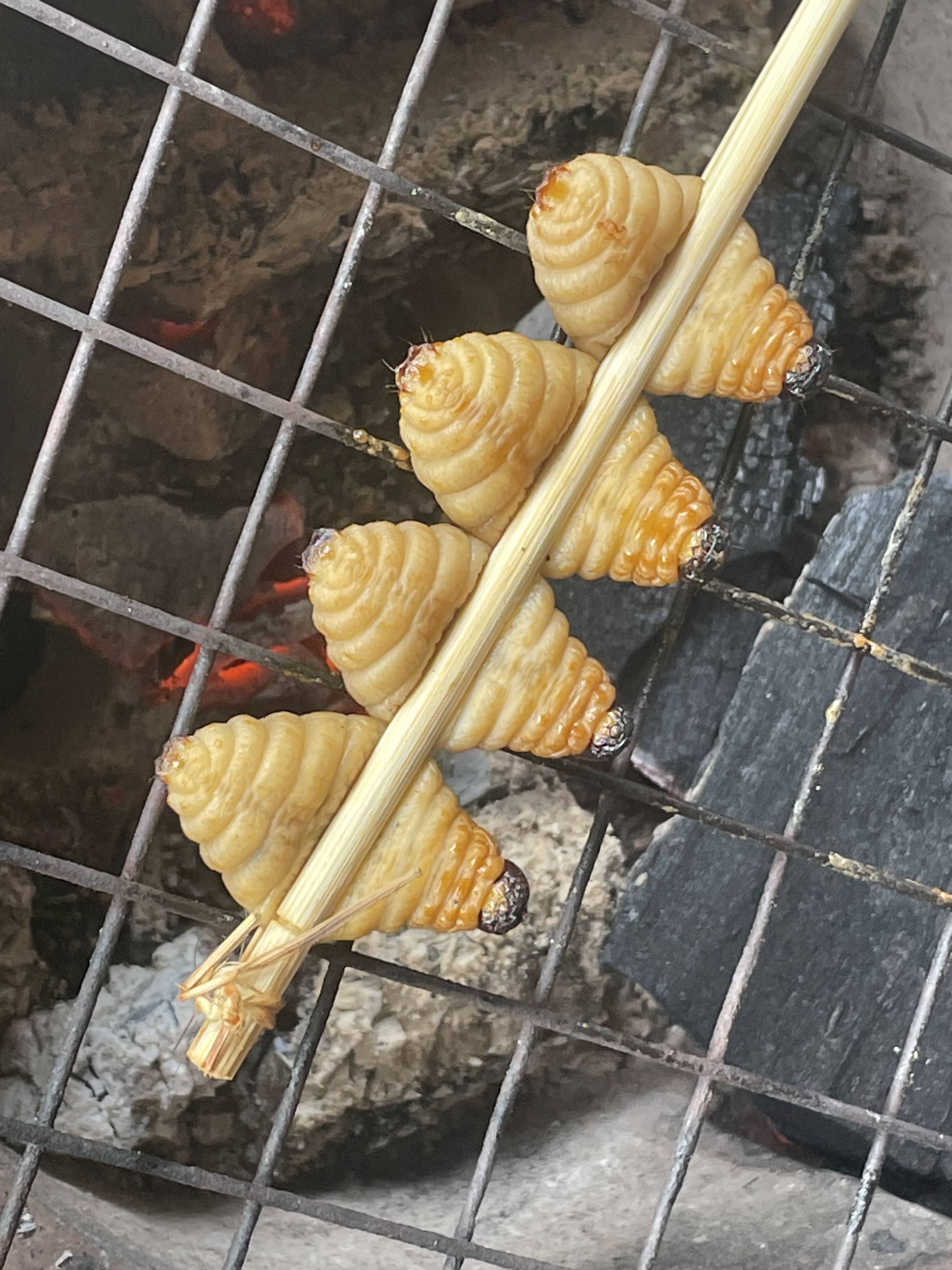
Toasted grubs of the Asian palm weevil in Laos

The larval grub is considered a delicacy in Vietnam. In Vietnam, the larvae are usually eaten alive with fish sauce. Other methods of cooking include toasting, frying and steaming. They are eaten with sticky rice and salad or cooked with porridge. The larvae are known in the Vietnamese language as đuông dừa ("coconut beetle-larva"). "Sago worms" reported from other countries (e.g., East Malaysia, New Guinea) refer to different, related species called Rhynchophorus vulneratus.

== Additional resources ==
- European Commission - Directorate-General for Health & Consumers (2011) The insect killing our palm trees. EU efforts to stop the Red Palm Weevil. ISBN 978-92-79-21268-0
- CISR: Red Palm Weevil Information
- Greek webpage dedicated to management
- USDA information page
- 12 Common Mistakes in Red Palm Weevil Management (Spanish)
