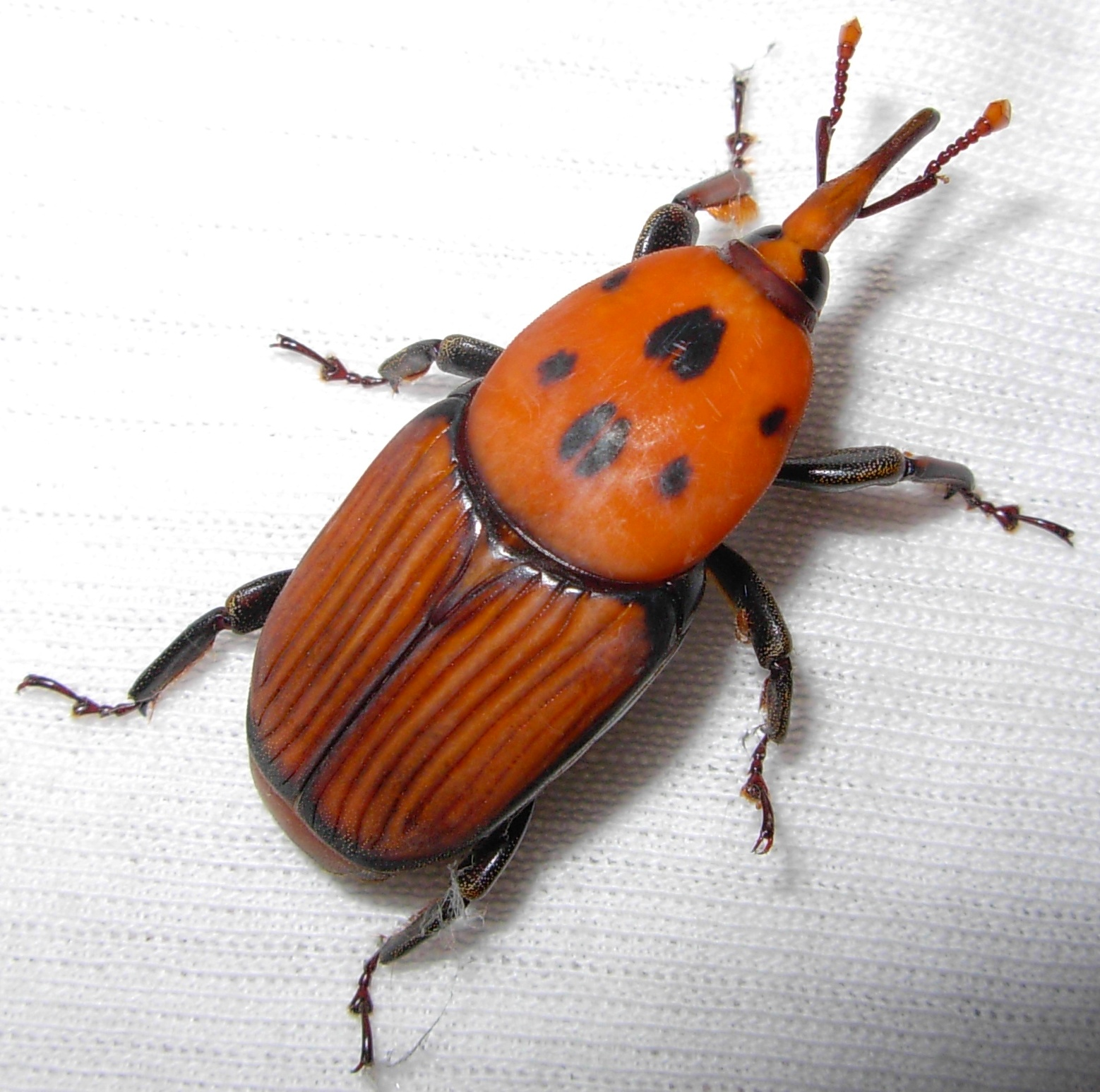
- Rhynchophorus ferrugineus

Scientific classification
- Kingdom: Animalia
- Phylum: Arthropoda
- Class: Insecta
- Order: Coleoptera
- Suborder: Polyphaga
- Infraorder: Cucujiformia
- Family: Curculionidae
- Subfamily: Dryophthorinae
- Tribe: Rhynchophorini
- Genus: Rhynchophorus; Herbst, 1795

Species
- 10 species; see text

Synonyms
- Calandra; Cordyle Thunberg, 1797; Rynchophorus Herbst, 1795 (lapsus calami)

= Rhynchophorus =

Genus of beetles

Rhynchophorus, the palm weevils, are a genus of beetles in the weevil family, Curculionidae. Palm weevils are major pests of various trees in the family Arecaceae throughout the tropics including: coconut (Cocos nucifera), Areca catechu, species of the genus Phoenix, and Metroxylon sagu. Two species are invasive pests outside their native ranges, Rhynchophorus ferrugineus and Rhynchophorus palmarum.

== Species ==
Image	Common name	Scientific name	Native distribution
	black palm weevil	Rhynchophorus bilineatus (Montrouzier, 1857)	Moluccas, Papua New Guinea and Solomon Islands
	palmetto weevil	Rhynchophorus cruentatus (Fabricius, 1775)	Florida, but has been found as far as southern Texas to the west and South Carolina to the north.
		Rhynchophorus distinctus Wattanapongsiri, 1966	Kalimantan
	red palm weevil	Rhynchophorus ferrugineus (Olivier, 1790) (aka Calandra ferruginea (Fabricius, 1801))	tropical Asia, Sri Lanka and the Philippines
		Rhynchophorus labatus Ritsema, 1882	Sumatra
	South American palm weevil	Rhynchophorus palmarum (Linnaeus, 1758)	Argentina to Paraguay and north through South and Central America to central Mexico and the Caribbean (Barbados, Dominica, Grenada, Guadeloupe, Martinique, Saint Lucia, Saint Vincent, Grenadines, Trinidad and Tobago, and perhaps Cuba, Dominican Republic, and Puerto Rico
	African palm weevil	Rhynchophorus phoenicis (Fabricius, 1801)	Senegal to Ethiopia and South Africa.
		Rhynchophorus quadrangulus Quedenfeldt, 1888	Cameroon
		Rhynchophorus richteri Wattanapongsiri, 1966	
	Sago palm weevil	Rhynchophorus vulneratus (Panzer, 1798)	Indonesia, Malaysia, Myanmar, Singapore, and Thailand
