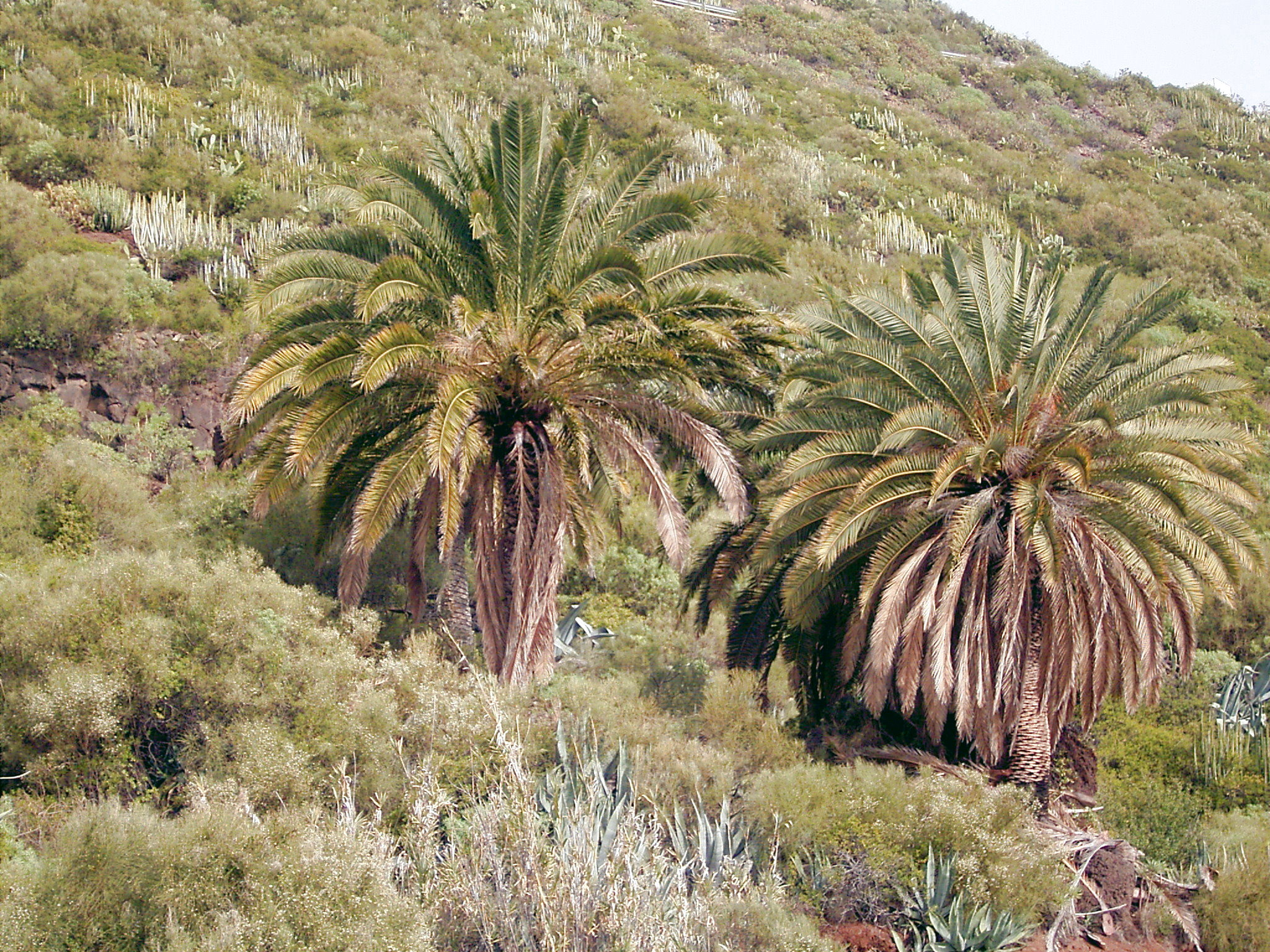
- Phoenix canariensis at Puntallana on La Palma in the Canary Islands

Conservation status
- Least Concern (IUCN 3.1)

Scientific classification
- Kingdom: Plantae
- Clade: Embryophytes
- Clade: Tracheophytes
- Clade: Spermatophytes
- Clade: Angiosperms
- Clade: Monocots
- Clade: Commelinids
- Order: Arecales
- Family: Arecaceae
- Genus: Phoenix
- Species: P. canariensis

Binomial name
- Phoenix canariensis H.Wildpret

Synonyms
- Phoenix jubae (Webb & Berthel.) Webb ex Christ; Phoenix senegalensis Lesch. ex André; Phoenix vigieri Naudin

= Phoenix canariensis =

Species of flowering plant

Phoenix canariensis, the Canary Island date palm, is a species of flowering plant in the palm family Arecaceae, native to the Canary Islands off the coast of Northwestern Africa. It is a relative of Phoenix dactylifera, the true date palm. It is the natural symbol of the Canary Islands, together with the canary Serinus canaria.

== Description ==
Phoenix canariensis is a large, solitary palm, 10–20 m (33–66 ft) tall, the tallest recorded being 36 m (118 ft) tall. The leaves are pinnate, 4–6 m (13–20 ft) long, with 80–100 leaflets on each side of the central rachis. There are typically around 75 to 125 living leaves on a tree, but the record number were on a tree on the French Riviera, which bore 443 green, fresh leaves at one time. The fruit is an oval, yellow to orange drupe 2 cm (0.79 in) long and 1 cm (0.39 in) in diameter, and containing a single large seed. The fruit pulp is edible, but is not a particularly good date.

== Names ==
The common name in English is Canary Island date palm, although it is sometimes known by its initials, "CIDP". It has also been called "pineapple palm". The common name in the Canary Islands and other Spanish-speaking countries is palmera canaria.

The variety Phoenix dactylifera var. jubae, now considered a synonym for P. canariensis, was named after King Juba II.

== Cultivation ==
The Canary Island date palm is typically cultivated in wet-winter or Mediterranean climates, but also in wet-summer or humid subtropical climates such as eastern Australia and the south-eastern United States. It is also increasingly being cultivated in higher latitude oceanic climates, such as Ireland, the UK, and the Channel Islands. It can be cultivated where temperatures rarely fall below −10 or −12 °C (14 or 10 °F) for extended periods, although it will require some protection if cold periods are longer than normal. Younger specimens, without a sizeable trunk, are more prone to freezing. It is a slow-growing tree, increasing in height by up to 60 cm (24 in) per year, and is propagated exclusively by seed. Mature P. canariensis are often used in ornamental landscaping and can be fairly readily collected and transplanted to a new planting location.

The palm is easily identified by its crown of leaves and trunk characteristics. Canary Island date palms are often pruned and trimmed to remove the lower, older leaves. When pruned, the bottom of the crown, also called the nut, appears to have a pineapple shape.

The Canary Island date palm is susceptible to Fusarium wilt, a fungal disease commonly transmitted through contaminated seed, soil, and pruning tools. Spread of the disease can be reduced if pruning tools are disinfected before use on each palm. In some parts of its cultivated range it is attacked by the invasive South American palm weevil Rhynchophorus palmarum and Asian palm weevil Rhynchophorus ferrugineus. Adult weevils are preferentially attracted to chemicals emitted by injured or damaged palms. The weevil larvae burrow into the crown then feast on the sugar-rich apical bud, which provides a path for bacterial or fungal pests. That typically kills the apical bud after some time, either due to secondary infection by pathogens or due to heavy infestation of larvae, causing the leaves to droop, turn brown and die.

P. canariensis has gained the Royal Horticultural Society's Award of Garden Merit.

== Use in landscaping in California ==
The Canary Island date palm appears in many notable examples of landscaping, particularly in the American state of California. According to legend, it was first planted in what is now San Diego in 1769, by Spanish missionary Junípero Serra, a founder of the California mission system. Though this story is likely false, Spanish missionaries did cultivate true date palms, rather than Canary Island date palms, in California in the late 1700s for the fruit. However, a Canary Island date palm was famously known as "The Serra Palm"—the palm supposedly planted by Junipero Serra in San Diego—before the tree's death in 1957.

Other famous plantings of the Canary Island date palm in California include the campus of Stanford University, which has 600 of the palms in its Mediterranean-inspired campus. Stanford's entrance, Palm Drive, is one example of extensive use of the palm in landscaping, including 166 of the species along the stretch leading to the campus. In Healdsburg, California Canary Island date palms were planted in the town's Plaza in 1897 as part of a campaign to promote the Sonoma County town as a tropical paradise.

== Other uses ==
In the Canary Islands, the sap of the date palm is used to make palm syrup. La Gomera is the only island where the syrup is produced in the Canary Islands.

== Invasiveness ==
In some areas, P. canariensis has proven to be an invasive plant. In Bermuda and the United States (Florida and California), it is considered naturalised (living wild in a region where it is not indigenous). It has also spread in some areas of peninsular Spain, Portugal, Italy, Croatia, Greece, North Africa, the Middle East, Australia, and New Zealand. It is listed as invasive in coastal southern California. In Auckland, New Zealand, the palm has itself become a host for the naturalised Australian strangler fig Ficus macrophylla.

== Gallery ==
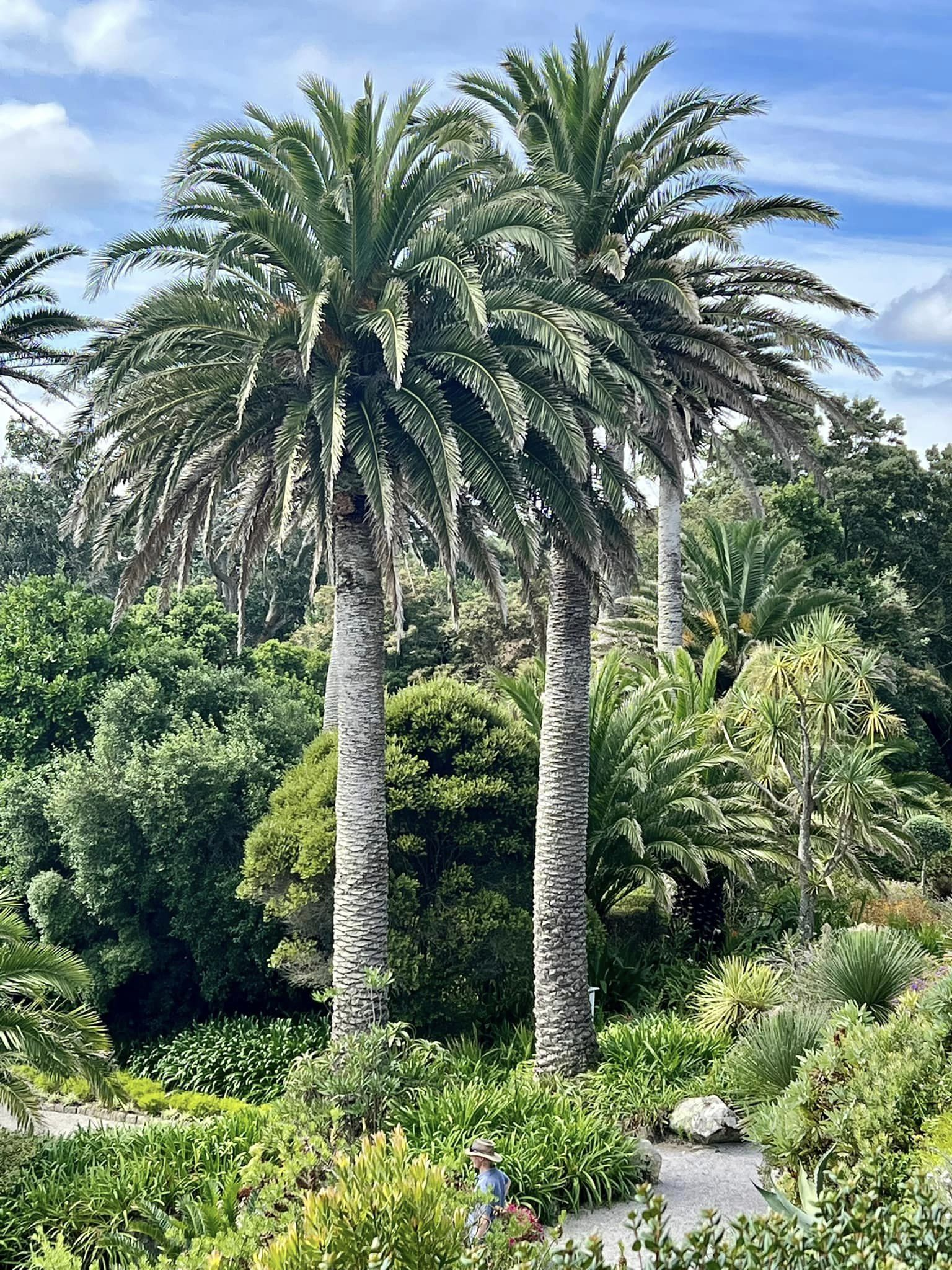
At Tresco Abbey Gardens, Scilly Isles, England

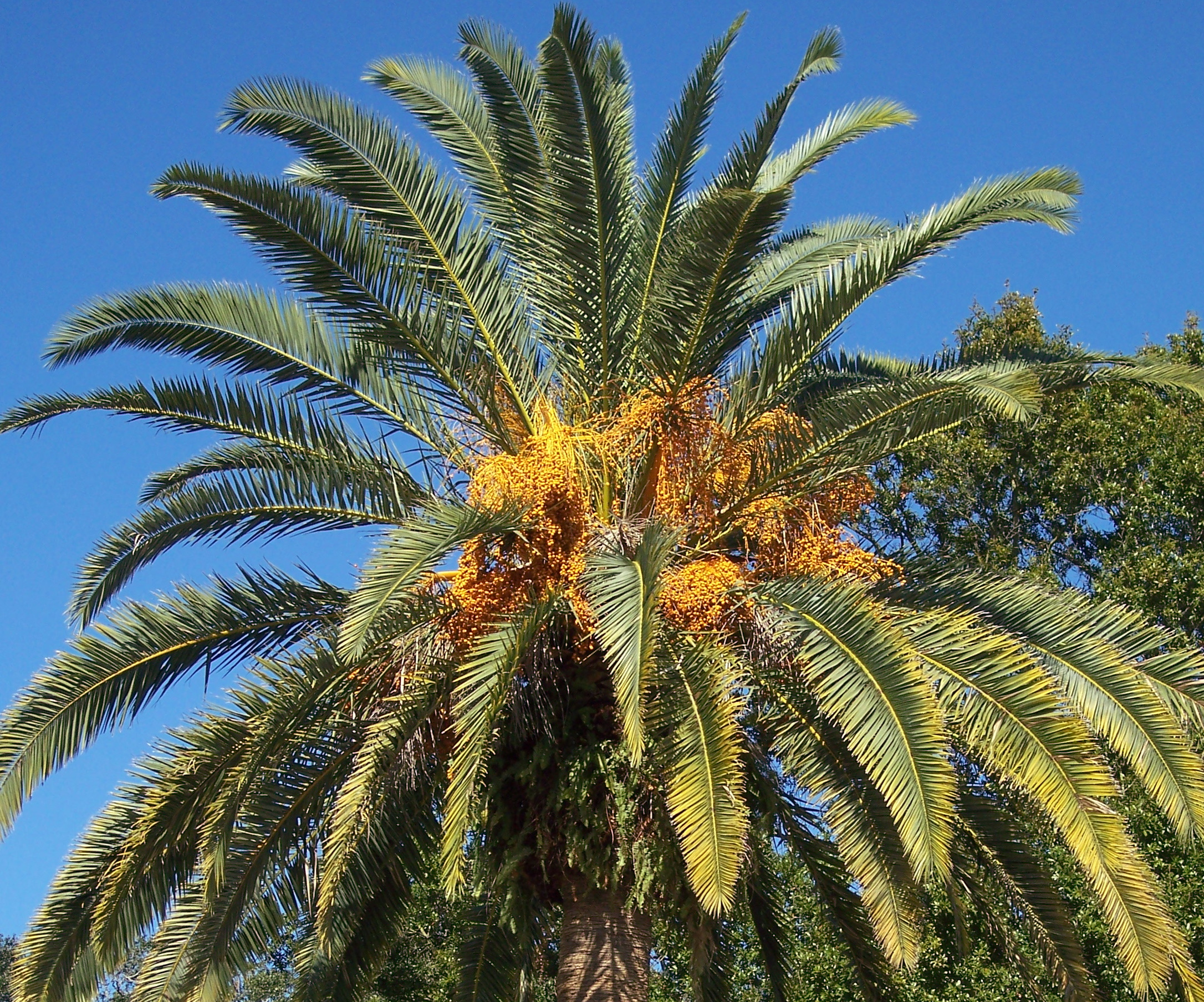
With fruit, northern Florida

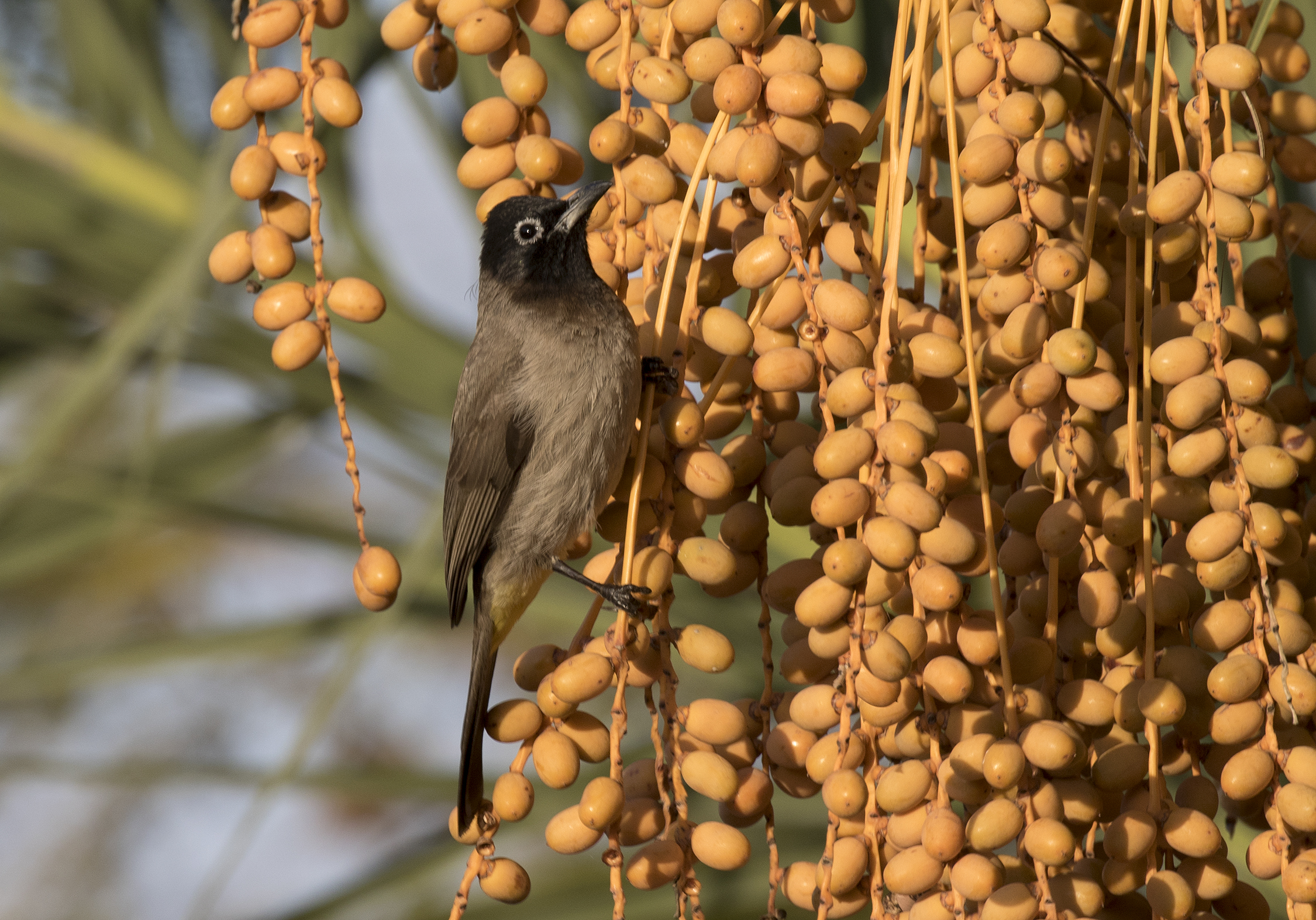
Fruit closeup

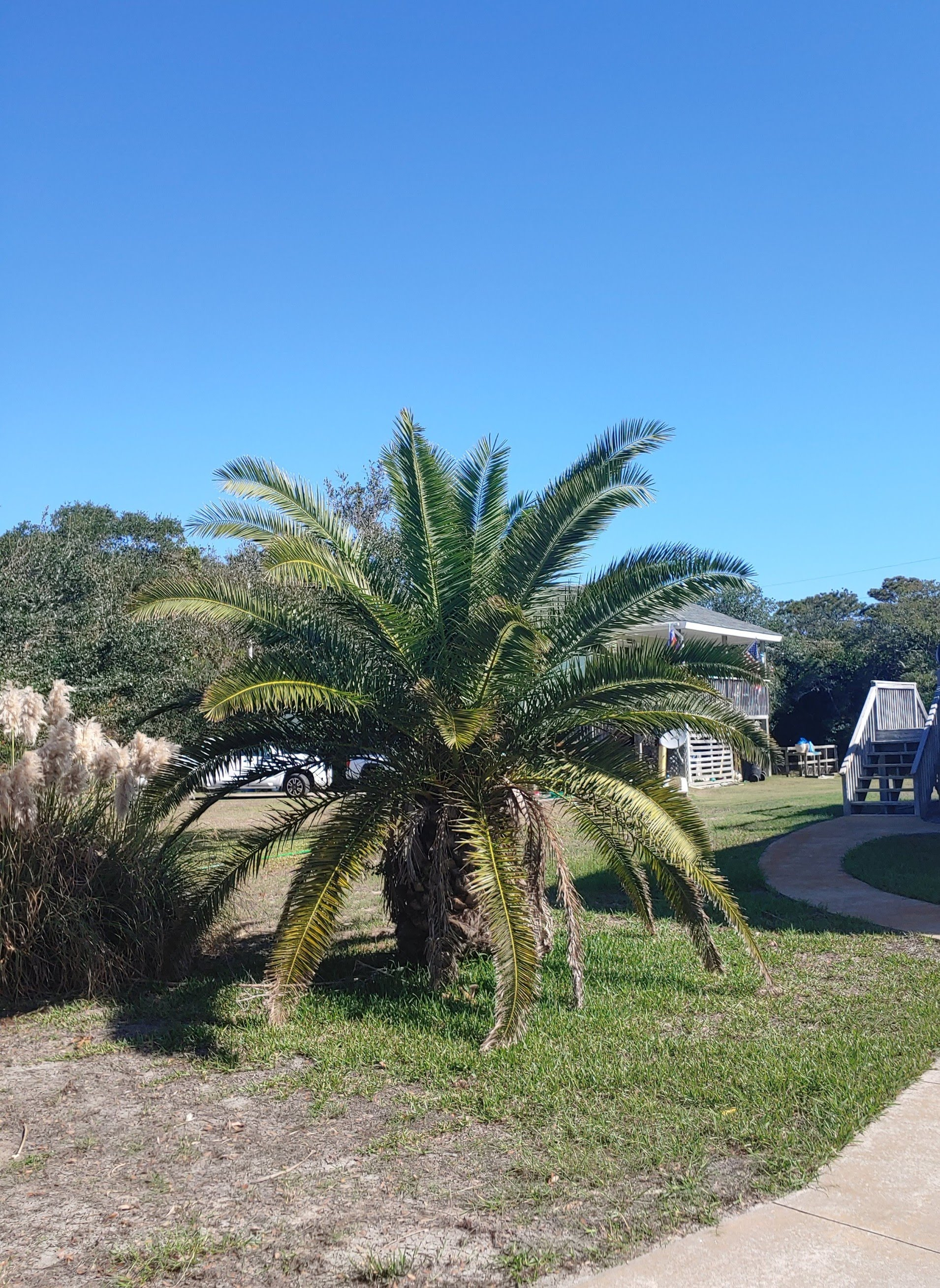
In Hatteras, North Carolina, near its northern natural limit on US east coast

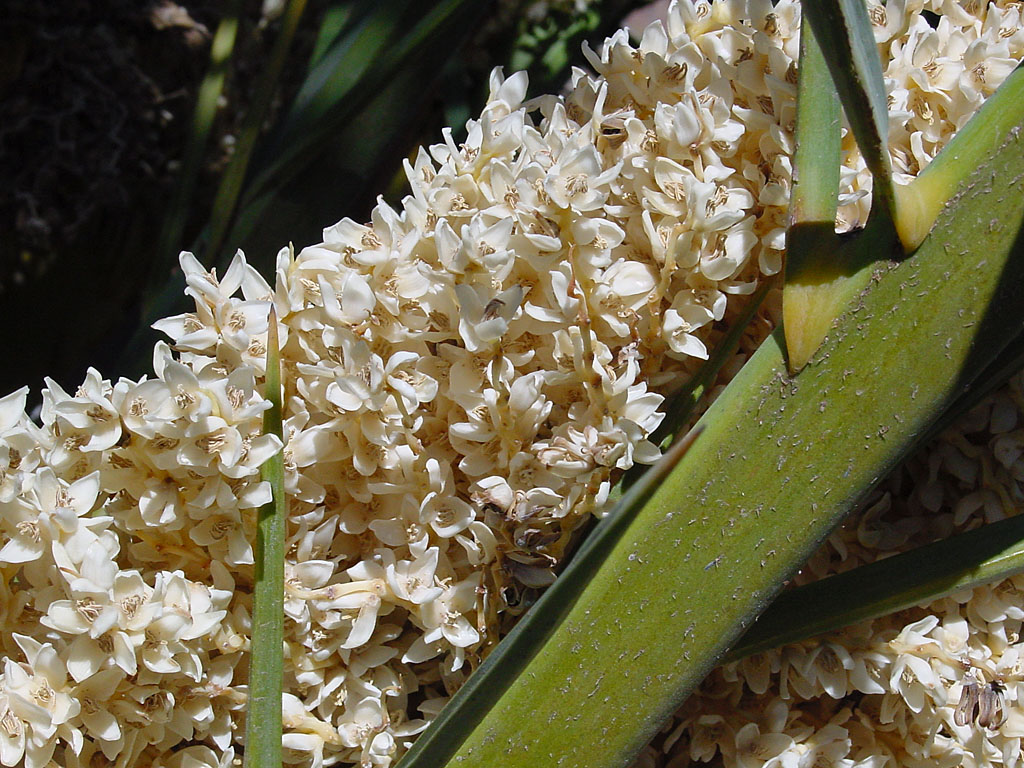
Flowers in Gran Canaria

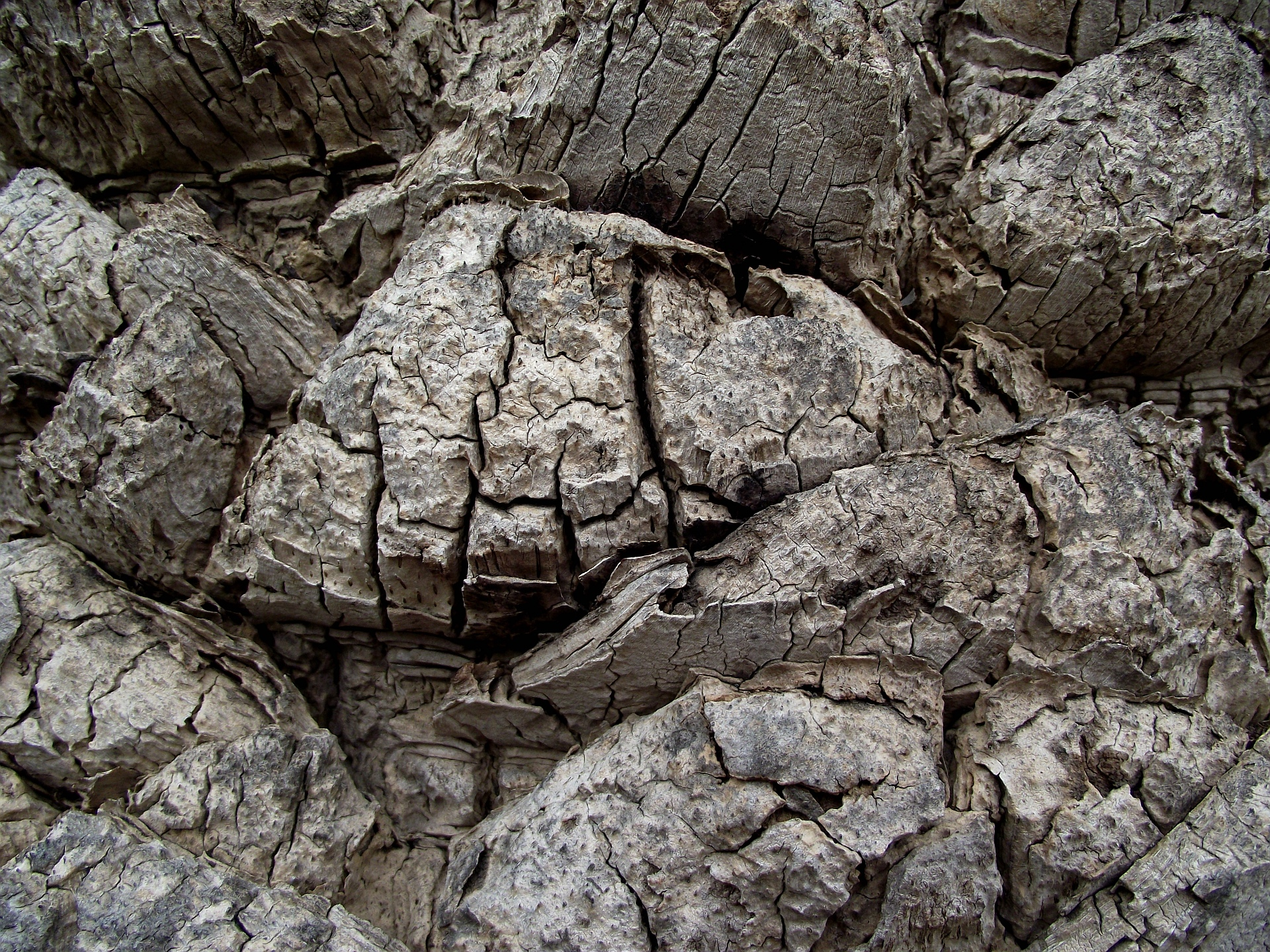
Bark

== See also ==
- List of animal and plant symbols of the Canary Islands
