= North Asmat language =

Asmat language spoken in Indonesia

North Asmat
- Mumugu, Pupis, Eroko
- Native to: Indonesia
- Region: Pulau Tiga District and Sawa Erma District, Asmat Regency, South Papua
- Ethnicity: Asmat people
- Native speakers: (1,000 cited 1991) (population may include Keenok, a dialect of Central Asmat)
- Language family: Trans–New Guinea: Asmat–Kamoro; Asmat; North Asmat

Language codes
- ISO 639-3: nks
- Glottolog: nort2917

North Asmat is a Papuan language of West New Guinea, spoken by the Asmat people. Dialects are Momogo (Mumugu), Pupis and Irogo (Eroko).
