= Casuarina Coast Asmat language =

Papuan language

Casuarina Coast Asmat
- Native to: Indonesia
- Region: Around Casuarina Coast; From Fayit District, Pantai Kasuari District, Safan District in Asmat Regency to Minyamur District in Mappi Regency, South Papua
- Ethnicity: Asmat people (Kaweinag)
- Native speakers: (9,000 cited 1991)
- Language family: Trans–New Guinea: Asmat–Kamoro; Asmat; Casuarina Coast Asmat

Language codes
- ISO 639-3: asc
- Glottolog: casu1237

Casuarina Coast Asmat is a Papuan language spoken along the Casuarina Coast of South Papua (in the region around the mouth of the Pulau River) by the Asmat people. It is the most divergent of the Asmat languages.

== Phonology ==
=== Consonants ===
	Labial	Alveolar	Palatal	Velar
Plosive	p	t		k
Fricative	f	s		
Nasal	m	n		
Rhotic		r		
Approximant	w		j	

Nasals /m, n/ may fluctuate to prenasal stops [ᵐb, ⁿd] in word-initial positions.

=== Vowels ===
	Front		Central	Back
High	i	y		u
Mid	e	ø		o
Low			a	
