= Kamberau language =

Trans–New Guinea language spoken in Indonesia

Kamberau
- Asienara, Iria
- Kamrau
- Native to: Indonesia
- Region: Kambrau (Kamberau) District, Kaimana Regency, West Papua Province
- Native speakers: (1,600 cited 1993)
- Language family: Trans–New Guinea: Central and South; Asmat–Kamoro; Sabakor; Kamberau
- Dialects: Ira (North Kamberau); Asienara (South Kamberau)

Language codes
- ISO 639-3: irx
- Glottolog: kamb1302

Kamberau or Kamrau is either of two Asmat–Kamoro languages spoken in Kambrau (Kamberau) District, Kaimana Regency, West Papua Province. North Kamberau is also known as Iria, and South Kamberau as Asienara, a name that has been mistakenly used for the related language Buruwai.
