= Asmat languages =

Trans–New Guinea language cluster

Asmat
- Geographic distribution: South Papua; Mappi Regency; Asmat Regency; West Papua; Kaimana Regency
- Ethnicity: Asmat, Buruwai, Citak
- Linguistic classification: Trans–New Guinea: Asmat–Kamoro; Asmat
- Subdivisions: Casuarina Coast; Citak; North Asmat; Central Asmat

Language codes
- Glottolog: asma1257

Asmat is a Papuan language cluster in Indonesia.

== Languages ==
The principal varieties, distinct enough to be considered separate languages, are:

- Asmat
  - Kamrau Bay (Sabakor/Buruwai):
  - Casuarina Coast (Kaweinag), the most divergent
  - North and Central Asmat
    - Citak (Kaünak)
    - North Asmat
    - Central Asmat (dialects: Keenok, Sokoni, Keenakap, Kawenak)

Ethnically, speakers are either Asmat, Buruwai, or Citak.

== Evolution ==
Below are some reflexes of proto-Trans-New Guinea proposed by Pawley (2012):

proto-Trans-New Guinea	Asmat (Flamingo Bay)
*maŋgat[a] ‘teeth, mouth’	me
*(m,mb)elak ‘light, lightning’	mer
*niman ‘louse’	(Kamoro namo)
*na- ‘eat’	na-
*ni, *nu ‘1PL’	na ‘1PL.INCL’, na(r) ‘1PL.EXCL’
*mun(a,i,u)ka ‘egg’	manaka
*niman ‘louse’	(cf. Kamoro namo)
*kasin ‘mosquito’	isi
*mbena ‘arm’	man [ban]
*mb(i,u)t(i,u)C ‘fingernail’	fit
*imbi ‘name’	yipi
*si(mb,p)at[V] ‘saliva’	(me)sep
*(mb,p)ututu- ‘to fly’	(?) pimedial
*kV(mb,p)(i,u)t(i,u) ‘head’	kuwus
*inda ‘fire’	(Central Coast Asmat isi)
*tututu[ku] ‘straight’	toror
*k(i,u)tuma ‘night, morning’	iram
*tututu[ku] ‘straight’	toror
*ti, *titi ‘tooth’	ji
*ata ‘excrement’	asa
*(ŋg,k)atata ‘dry’	soso
*kV(mb,p)(i,u)t(i,u) ‘head’	kuwus
*kasin ‘mosquito’	(Citak Asmat isi)
*inda ‘fire’	(Central Coast Asmat isi)
*ke(nj,s)a ‘blood’	es
*maŋgV ‘compact round object’	moko-per ‘navel’
*mun(a,i,u)ka ‘egg’	manaka
*ke(nj,s)a ‘blood’	es
*kasin ‘mosquito’	(Central Asmat isi)
*k(i,u)tuma ‘night, morning’	yiram
*kV(mb,p)(i,u)t(i,u) ‘head’	kuwus
*(m,mb)elak ‘light, lightning’	(Flamingo Bay Asmat mer ‘lightning’)
*ya ‘3SG’	a

== Verbs ==
In Flamingo Bay Asmat, light verbs are combined with adjuncts to form predicative expressions.

- e- ‘do’
  - atow e- /play do/ ‘play’
  - caj e- /copulate do/ ‘copulate’
  - yan e- /ear do/ ‘listen’
- yi- ‘say’
  - po yi- /paddle say/ ‘paddle’
  - yan yi- /ear say/ ‘hear’
  - mesa yi- /saliva say/ ‘spit’
- af- ‘hit’
  - yaki af- /sneeze hit/ ‘sneeze’
  - namir af- /death hit/ ‘die’
  - omop af- /blow hit/ ‘beat’
