= List of districts of South Papua =

The province of South Papua (Provinsi Papua Selatan) in Indonesia is divided into four kabupaten (regencies) which in turn are divided administratively into districts, known as distrik under the law of 2001 on "special autonomy for Papua province".

== List ==
The districts of South Papua and their respective regencies are as follows (as of July 2022). Administrative villages (desa in rural areas and kelurahan in urban areas) are also listed for each district.

Regency	District	Languages in district	Administrative villages
Asmat	Agats		Asuwetsy, Bis Agats, Bisman, Bou, Briten (Biriten / Beriten), Kaye, Mbait, Per, Saw, Suwru, Uwus, Yamoth (Yomoth)
Asmat	Akat		Akat (Ayam), Bayiw Pinam, Beco, Buetkwar (Betkuar), Cumnew, Fakan, Jewes, Menepsimni (Manepsimni / Manep), Simini, Waw, Yuni
Asmat	Atsy / Atsj		Amanamkai, Ambisu, Atsj (Atsy), Bakasei, Bine, Bipin (Bipim), Cewewyamew, Sagoni / Sogoni, Yaisiu (Yaisu / Yasiu)
Asmat	Ayip		Comoro, Kawet, Mausi, Sagare, Wagi, Yefiwangi (Yefuwagi)
Asmat	Betcbamu		Atambuts, Biwar Laut, Desep, Omanesep, Pirpis, Warkal (Warkai), Yauw (You)
Asmat	Der Koumur		Amagais, Amaru (Amoro), Amkai, Amkun / Amkum (Ankum), Ero Saman, Sohomane, Suagai / Suwagai (Suwa), Yamkap (Yankap), Yerfum
Asmat	Fayit		Acenep (Ocenep/Otsjanep), Ainamsato, Ais, Akan Tapak, Amaita, Bagair, Bakyor, Basim, Bawos, Biopis, Bora, Isar, Kagas, Kayarpis, Mapane, Nanai (Nanay), Piramat, Pirien, Sayoa, Tauro, Waras, Wiyar, Yawas
Asmat	Jetsy		Akamar, Birak, Dawer, Katew, Pau, Powetsy, Sisakem, Yetsy
Asmat	Joerat		Omor, Onavai, Yamas, Yaun, Yeni / Yemi, Yufri (Smith)
Asmat	Kolf Braza		Auban, Binamsain, Butukatnau, Mabul, Patipi (Patippi), Pepera, Pirabanak, Sipenap / Sipanap (Asarep), Ulakin, Woutu Brasa, Woutu Kolof
Asmat	Kopay		Aikut, Hahare, Heiyaram, Kaipom, Kawem, Sanep / Sanem, Sapen (Airosapem), Sasime, Simipit (Sinepit), Wagasu
Asmat	Pantai Kasuari		Bawor, Hainam, Kamur, Sanapai (Senapai), Sanep, Saramit / Seramit, Sarmafo, Yagamit, Yahui (Yahoi)
Asmat	Pulau Tiga		Aoep, Aou, As, Atat, Eroko, Esmapan, Fumeripit, Kapi, Nakai, Weo, Yakapis
Asmat	Safan		Aworkey / Aworket, Bayun, Emene (Eumene), Jitorsok, Kagirim / Kairin, Primapun (Firimapun / Firimapon), Saman, Samendoro / Semendoro, Santabor (Santambor), Simsagar, Tereo / Tareo (Taero), Yaptambor
Asmat	Sawa Erma		Agani, Bu, Er, Erma, Mumugu, Mumugu Dua, Pupis, Sauti, Sawa, Sona
Asmat	Sirets		Awok, Biwar Darat, Damen, Fos, Kaimo, Sakor, Waganu, Yaosakor
Asmat	Suator		Amakot, Ayak, Banum, Binam, Bor, Bubis, Bumu, Burbis, Daikot, Dekamor / Dekamer, Emnam, Jinak, Kapayap Dua, Kapayap Satu, Kapayap Tiga, Karbis, Nagatun, Somnak, Soray / Sorai, Ujung Batu, Vakam, Vakam Dua, Wabak, Wagabus, Waganu Dua, Waijens, Wowi
Asmat	Suru-suru		Ajin, Asgun, Berimono, Besika, Dumaten, Hom-hom, Hulam, Jifak, Katalina, Kebikduk, Koba, Korobuk, Laluk, Linduk, Obio, Sagapu, Salbik, Se (See), Suru-Suru, Tii, Tomor, Walase, Yensuku (Jesenko)
Asmat	Unir Sirau		Abamu, Amor, Ayir, Berip / Birip, Jipawer (Yipawer), Komor, Munu, Paar, Werer (Warer)
Boven Digoel	Ambatkwi (Ambatkui)		Anyumka, Arimbit, Awaken (Nyum), Klofkamp (Kolopkam), Kuken
Boven Digoel	Arimop		Arimbet, Aroa, Bukit, Ginggimop (Ginggimob), Maju, Patriot, Ujung
Boven Digoel	Bomakia		Aifa (Aifo), Bomakia Dua (II), Bomakia Satu (I), Somi, Uni
Boven Digoel	Firiwage		Firiwage, Kabuwage, Karuwage, Waliburu
Boven Digoel	Fofi		Bangun, Domo, Hamkhu, Hello, Makmur, Navini, Sadar, Sohokanggo
Boven Digoel	Iniyandit		Autriop, Langgoan, Ogenatan (Ogenetan / Ogenathan), Tetop, Wariktop (Wariktoop)
Boven Digoel	Jair		Anggai, Asiki, Butiptiri, Getentiri, Kapogu, Miri
Boven Digoel	Kawagit		Biwage, Biwage Dua, Kawagit, Kombai, Niop, Wanggom
Boven Digoel	Ki		Metto, Obinangge, Ujungkia, Watemu
Boven Digoel	Kombay	Kombai	Dema, Sinimburu, Ugo, Wanggemalo, Yafufla
Boven Digoel	Kombut		Amuan, Kawangtet, Kombut, Moukbiran (Mokbiran)
Boven Digoel	Kouh		Jair, Kouh, Mandobo
Boven Digoel	Mandobo	Mandobo	Ampera, Mariam, Mawan, Persatuan, Sohokanggo (Sokanggo)
Boven Digoel	Manggelum		Bayanggop, Burunggop, Gaguop, Kewam, Mangga Tiga, Manggelum
Boven Digoel	Mindiptana		Andobit (Andopbit), Anggumbit, Awayanka, Epsembit, Imko, Kakuna, Kamka, Mindiptana, Niyimbang, Osso, Tinggam, Umap, Wanggatkibi (Wanggat Kibi)
Boven Digoel	Ninati		Kawaktembut, Ninati, Tembutka, Timka, Upyetetko
Boven Digoel	Sesnuk		Amboran, Anggamburan, Kanggup, Sesnuk, Yomkondo
Boven Digoel	Subur		Aiwat, Kaisa (Kaisah), Subur, Waghai (Bhakti)
Boven Digoel	Waropko		Ikcan, Inggembit (Enggembit), Jetetkun / Yetetkun, Kanggewot, Upkim, Wametkapa, Winiktit, Wombon, Woropko (Waropko)
Boven Digoel	Yaniruma		Fefero (Fefeko), Manggemakhe (Manggemahe), Yaniruma
Mappi	Assue		Aboge, Asaren (Assaren), Chanani (Khanami), Eci, Girimio, Haffo, Homang, Isage, Jufo Besar, Jufo Kecil, Kaitok, Keru, Khabu, Kiki, Kopi, Meda, Sigare, Yame
Mappi	Bamgi		Konebi, Sibi, Tagaimon Karome, Tagaimon Sino, Yeloba
Mappi	Citak-Mitak (Citakmitak)		Abau, Bidneu (Bidnew), Epem, Kumasma, Senggo, Tamanin (Tamanim), Womin
Mappi	Edera		Bade, Banamepe, Geturki, Gimikia (Gemikya), Isyaman, Mememu, Yodom
Mappi	Haju		Amagatsu, Amenda, Amuro (Omuro), Arare, Atsipim, Gairipim, Kaibu, Kaibusene, Kasima, Katage, Kerke, Mani, Okor (Okoor), Paghai (Pagai), Semtaipim (Tsemtaipim), Sogope (Sogophe), Warogom, Wiyage, Yagatsu
Mappi	Kaibar		Amasu (Amazu), Binerbis, Fomu, Imembi, Tayau, Tiau, Yemu
Mappi	Mambioman Bapai		Agham, Ghanu, Ima, Khatan, Kogoyaman, Linggua, Magabag, Monana, Mur, Tereyemu, Waghien / Koba, Wagin, Waman, Waruwe, Yatan
Mappi	Minyamur		Ati / Atti, Kabe, Kaumi, Kayagae (Kayagai), Kofar, Kogir, Komru, Pano, Sene, Sumuraman (Sumur Aman), Taragai / Taragae, Upin
Mappi	Obaa		Dagimon, Emete, Enem, Gauda, Harome, Kadam / Oyim, Kepi, Kogo, Madu, Mappi Bawah / Yamui, Marbin, Masin, Metim, Muin, Obaa, Paedam, Piai, Rayam, Rep, Soba, Tokhom, Wairu, Wanggate, Yangpop
Mappi	Passue		Afogoma, Bagaram, Baitate, Kaime, Kotiak, Kotup (Xotup), Menya, Nohon, Passue / Taim, Rimba Jaya (Gayu), Sepoh, Tokhompatu / Tokompatu (Thokompatu), Urufu
Mappi	Passue Bawah		Bifo, Busiri, Haku, Honya, Keta, Samurukie, Veta, Wonggi
Mappi	Syahcame		Asset, Bosma, Homlikia (Homilikia / Homlikya), Kobeta, Oghoto, Osso
Mappi	Ti Zain		Basman, Kumaban, Merokima, Mu, Pier, Sagis, Tarwa, Tugumau
Mappi	Venaha		Getiyo, Harapan, Memes, Mopio, Pies (Piyes), Sahapikia (Sahapikya), Sien, Yibin
Mappi	Yakomi		Amk, Benggo, Borohaba, Hebeske, Kokoya, Ogorito, Yame
Merauke	Animha		Baad, Kaisah, Koa, Senegi, Wayau (Wayao / Wajau)
Merauke	Elikobal		Bouwer, Bumun, Bunggay, Bupul, Bupul Indah, Enggal Jaya, Geriser (Gerisar), Kweel, Metaat Makmur (Mantaat Makmur), Sipias, Tanas (Tanaas), Tof-Tof (Taftof)
Merauke	Ilwayab (Ilyawab)		Bibikem, Uli Uli, Wanam, Wogekel
Merauke	Jagebob		Angger Parmegi (Permegi), Blandin Kakayu (Blandin Kakayo), Gurinda Jaya, Jagebob Raya, Kamno Sari, Kartini, Makarti Jaya, Melin Megikar, Mimi Baru, Nalkin, Obaathrw (Obathrow / Obaa Troow), Poo, Wenda Asri, Yemunain Jaya (Jemunaen Jaya / Jemunaim Jaya)
Merauke	Kaptel		Bu Epe, Ihalik, Kaniskobat, Kaptel, Kwemsid
Merauke	Kimaam		Deka, Kalilam, Kimaam, Kiworo, Komolom, Kumbis, Mambum, Purawanderu, Teri, Turiram, Umanderu, Webu, Woner
Merauke	Kontuar		Kawe, Pembri, Sibenda, Wantarma, Wetau
Merauke	Kurik		Anumbob, Candra Jaya, Harapan Makmur, Ivimahad (Ivi Mahad), Jaya Makmur, Kaliki, Kurik, Salor Indah, Sumber Mulya, Sumber Rejeki, Telaga Sari, Wapeko, Wonorejo
Merauke	Malind		Domande, Kaiburse (Kaliburse), Kumbe, Onggari, Padang Raharja, Rawasari, Suka Maju
Merauke	Merauke		Bambu Pemali, Bokem, Buti, Kamahedoga, Kamundu, Karang Indah, Kelapa Lima, Mandala, Maro, Muli, Nasem, Nggolar, Rimba Jaya, Samkai, Seringgu Jaya, Wasur
Merauke	Muting		Andaito, Boha, Efkab Makmur (Metaat Makmur), Enggol Jaya (Elanggol Jaya), Kolam, Manway Bop (Manway Bob / Man Wai Bob), Muting, Pachas, Seed Agung (Sedayu Agung Prasasti), Selauw, Sigabel Jaya, Wan
Merauke	Naukenjerai		Kondo, Kuler (Tunas Baru), Onggaya, Tomer, Tomerau
Merauke	Ngguti		Nakias, Po Epe, Salam Epe, Taga Epe, Yawimu, Yomop
Merauke	Okaba		Alaku, Alatep, Dufmiraf, Es Wambi, Iwol, Makaling, Okaba, Sanggase, Wambi
Merauke	Padua		Bamol Dua (II), Bamol Satu (I), Padua, Sabudom, Sigad
Merauke	Semangga		Kuper, Kuprik, Marga Mulya, Matara, Muram Sari (Muramsari), Semangga Jaya (Semanggi Jaya), Sido Mulyo (Sidomulyo), Urumb, Waninggap Kay / Kai, Waninggap Nanggo
Merauke	Sota	Yam languages	Erambu, Rawa Biru, Sota, Toray (Torray), Yanggandur
Merauke	Tabonji		Iromoro, Konjombando, Suam, Tabonji, Wanggambi, Yamuka, Yeraha
Merauke	Tanah Miring		Amun Kay, Bersehati, Hidup Baru, Isano Mbias (Isanombias), Kamangi, Ngguti Bob, Sarmayam Indah, Soa, Sumber Harapan, Tambat, Waninggap Miraf, Waninggap Say, Yaba Maru (Yabamaru), Yasa Mulya
Merauke	Tubang		Dodalim, Dokib, Wamal, Welbuti, Woboyo, Yowit (Yowied)
Merauke	Ulilin		Baidub, Belbelan (Belbeland), Kafyamke, Kandrakay (Kandrakai), Kindiki, Kir Ely (Kireli), Kumaaf, Mandekman, Nggayu, Rawahayu, Selil
Merauke	Waan		Dafnawanga, Kladar, Konorau, Sabon, Tor, Waan

== See also ==
- List of districts of West Papua
