= Citak language =

Trans–New Guinea language spoken in Indonesia

Citak
- Kau Adagum
- Native to: Indonesia (South Papua)
- Region: Mappi Regency
- Ethnicity: Citak people
- Native speakers: (8,000 cited 1985)
- Language family: Trans–New Guinea: Central and South New Guinea; Asmat–Kamoro; Asmat; Citak

Language codes
- ISO 639-3: Variously: txt – Citak diy – Diuwe tml – Tamnim Citak
- Glottolog: cita1246
- ELP: Diuwe

Citak or Kaunak is the Papuan language of Citak-Mitak district (kecamatan), Mappi Regency, Indonesia. It is called by its speakers Kau Adagum (lit. 'Kau Language'), Citak is an exonym from the Awyu people. Tamnim Citak is a distinct dialect. Diuwe is unverified as a language.
