= Central Asmat language =

Papuan language of West New Guinea

Central Asmat
- Native to: Indonesia
- Region: Asmat Regency, South Papua
- Ethnicity: Asmat people
- Native speakers: (7,000 cited 1972); 2,000 Yaosakor (1991), perhaps counted above
- Language family: Trans–New Guinea: Asmat–Kamoro; Asmat; Central Asmat

Language codes
- ISO 639-3: cns – inclusive code Individual code: asy – Yaosakor Asmat
- Glottolog: cent2247

Central Asmat is a Papuan language of West New Guinea, spoken by the Asmat people.

== Dialects ==
Central Asmat has a number of dialects, which are:

- Keenok
- Sokoni
- Keenakap
- Kawenak (subdialects: Simai, Kainak, Mismam, Mecemup)

Yaosakor Asmat, assigned its own ISO code, is a variety of Central Asmat, not a distinct language.

== Phonology ==
=== Consonants ===
| | Labial | Alveolar | Palatal | Velar |
|---|---|---|---|---|
| Nasal | m | n | | |
| Plosive | p | t | tʃ | k |
| Fricative | f | s | ʝ | |
| Rhotic | | r | | |
| Approximant | w | | | |

- /p/ can be heard as a fricative [ɸ] when in intervocalic positions, as [pʷ] in the speech of older speakers when preceding /e/.
- /tʃ/ can be heard as a palatalized [tʲ] when in word-final positions following /i/.
- /k/ can be heard as a fricative [x] when following a vowel and preceding a consonant.
- /s/ can be heard as fricatives [θ] or [ʃ] among some older speakers.
- /r/ can be heard as a flap [ɾ] in word-medial and word-final positions.
- /ʝ/ can be heard as [dʒ] or [j] in word-initial positions.
- Nasals /m, n/ may fluctuate to voiced stops [b, d] in word-initial positions, and as prenasal stops [ᵐb, ⁿd] when in syllable-initial positions.

=== Vowels ===
| | Front | Central | Back |
|---|---|---|---|
| High | i | | u |
| Mid | e | ə | o |
| Low | | a | |

| Phoneme | Allophones |
|---|---|
| /i/ | [i], [y], [ɪ] |
| /e/ | [e], [ɛ], [ø] |
| /a/ | [ä], [a], [æ] |
| /o/ | [o], [ɤ], [ɔ] |
| /u/ | [u], [ʉ] |
