= Kajakaja language =

Kajakaja of New Guinea may be:

- Central Asmat language, a Papuan language of the southern coastal plains of Indonesian New Guinea
- Nduga language, a Papuan language of the Indonesian New Guinea Highlands
