= Jew (house) =

Asmat Traditional House in South Papua, Indonesia

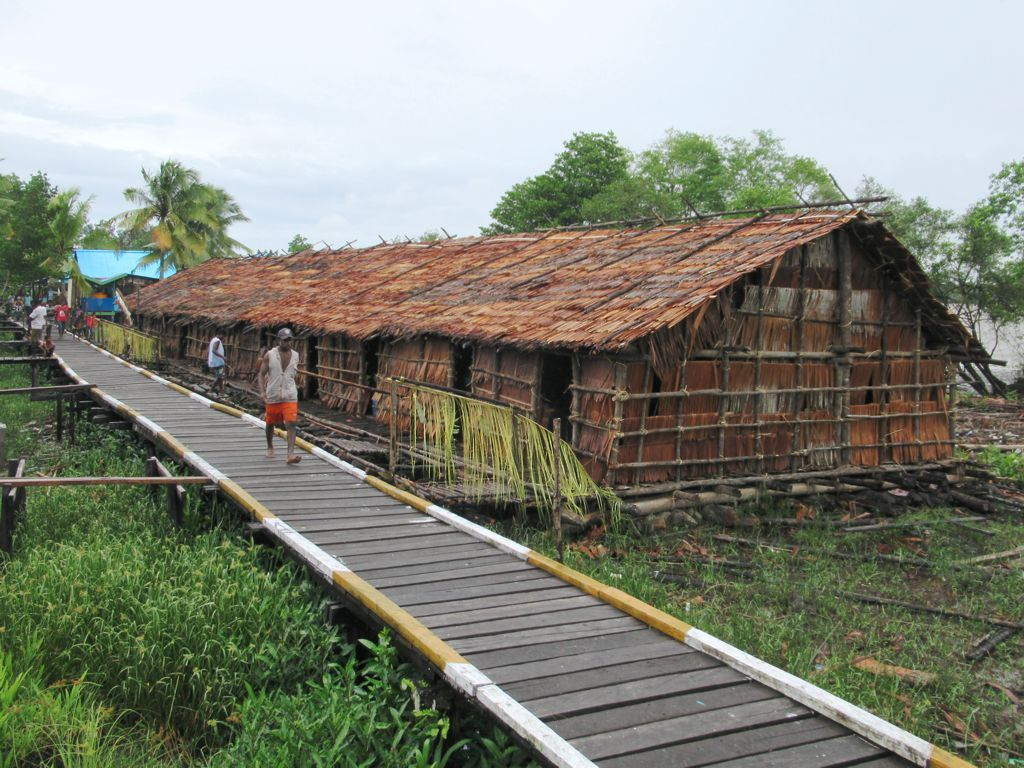
Jew house in the village of Syuru, Agats.

Jew, also known as the bachelor house, is an Asmat traditional house originating from the Asmat Regency, particularly from Agats. Jew, also known by several other names such as Je, Jeu, Yeu, or Yai, is a rectangular elevated house made of wood, with walls and roofs made of woven sago palm or nipa palm leaves. Jew entirely avoids using nails and uses rattan roots as connectors instead.

The house is open only for unmarried men to assemble; children under 10 and women are not allowed to enter the house.

== Characteristics ==
Jew is built entirely using natural materials obtained from the surrounding villages, in accordance with the Asmat people's customary belief that their ancestors and the surrounding nature have synergized to provide for their needs. The wood used to construct a jew is ironwood because it is strong and resistant to water, especially seawater, in the Asmat geographical location along the coastal areas and around swamps. Jew is always erected facing the river, specifically at the river's edge, especially at the bends of the river, with the main support posts of the house adorned with Asmat motifs. Jew are built in river bends because conflicts within Asmat ethnic groups were common in the past. By constructing them along the river, particularly in bends, the Jew's occupants could easily detect the enemy's attacks. However, warfare and inter-ethnic conflicts among the Asmat people no longer occur today.

The number of doors in the jew is equal to the number of fireplaces and mbis statues (Asmat ancestral statues), which also reflect the number of families or tysem in the Asmat people living around the Jew. According to Asmat's belief, the mbis statue is able to ward off evil influences on the unmarried men inside the house. Additionally, there are other specific characteristics of the jew, such as:

- The typical size of a jew is 10×15 meters.
- Jew can even reach sizes of 30–60 meters with a width of 10 meters.
- There are 2 doors located at the front and back of the house.
- The house's roof is made of woven nipa palm or sago palm leaves.
- The support posts are made of ironwood and are 2.5 meters tall, carved with Asmat tribal motifs.
- The floor of the jew is usually made of the same material as the roof, which is sago palm leaves.
- The house's walls are made of vertically woven sago palm stems tied with rattan roots.
- The walls, roof, and floor are usually replaced every 5 years.
- jew are usually built around small family homes called cem or tysem.

== Functions ==
As a sacred house for the Asmat people, jew serves multiple functions. Apart from being a residence for unmarried men, it is also a place for meetings to resolve disputes among villagers, plan traditional ceremonies, tribal meetings, peace agreements, wars, and even conduct customary rituals. Furthermore, it is used as a storage space for carvings depicting their deceased ancestors or spirits. In the past, jew was also used to store skulls, spirit boats (wuramon), spirit clothes (ifi or yipawer), ase (noken) bags, war spears, warhead shields, eme (tifa), and other sacred objects. Noken is a bag made of woven plant fibers that is used as a storage bag and worn around the neck. According to Asmat's belief, noken can cure various diseases for the patient with specific rules and conditions. Another function of the jew is as a village hall and a place to welcome guests.

Inside the jew, younger unmarried men receive a wide range of education from older single men to married men. The education they receive includes utilizing the resources available in their environment with existing technology, developing skills, playing the tifa, dancing, and singing. Additionally, they are introduced to Asmat tribal heroes like Fumiripits, also known as the "Great Headhunter", who is considered the ancestor of the Asmat. In the past, they were also taught how to perform headhunting, traditional ceremonies, and singing sacred songs. Furthermore, these young men are taught to carve according to Asmat customary regulations. Typically, only men are allowed to carve wood, and they usually do not sketch when carving statues because through carving, they can communicate with their ancestors according to the three worlds concept they know: Amat ow capinmi (the current realm of life), Dampu ow campinmi (the realm where the spirits of the deceased dwell), and Safar (heaven). Additionally, the Asmat people identifies themselves as trees. For them, their feet are equivalent to the roots of a tree, their bodies are like the trunk of a tree, their arms are like branches or twigs of a tree, and their heads are like the fruit of that tree.

The jew also indirectly teaches the Asmat people about local wisdom and noble values passed down through generations from their ancestors, namely the values of forest conservation. With the presence of sacred forests sanctified in each Asmat village, the existence of forests there never change. Opening up forest land is considered taboo by them, and they even prohibit various human activities in the middle of the forest. Violating these rules can lead to disasters for their village, and it may even cause "breathlessness" if they do not pay the fines according to the rules set by each traditional elder there. Other values still practiced include the prohibition of extinguishing the wayir fire (fire from the main hearth in the middle of the jew) and the obligation to play the tifa musical instrument and sing songs in each jew. Jew also serves as a place for distributing respek funds to the family members residing in the tysem house around jew. Respek funds are budgetary aid provided by the Papua Special Autonomy budget.

== Kinship value in the Jew ==
The value of kinship among the Asmat people is not only formed from blood relations or marital ties but also developed during their childhood when living in jew. Friendships formed include helping each other in times of difficulty, sharing food supplies, sharing cigarettes, and so on. The most extreme form of this camaraderie is the tradition of papisj, where they exchange wives for predetermined nights accompanied by traditional festivities. These friendships can even continue as familial bonds when one of them passes away. The deceased's relatives will adopt their living relatives, and the living individuals may even be called by the name of their deceased relative. The deceased relatives also leave various belongings such as sago, clothing, rice, sugar, and shells to their living relatives. The living relatives also bear responsibilities such as serving their deceased relatives for three days at the mourning house and taking on various obligations that were borne by the deceased during their lifetime, such as fines, conflicts, and dowries.
