= Safan language =

Safan language may refer to:

- a dialect of Casuarina Coast Asmat in New Guinea
- Safen language in Senegal
