= IPCA =

IPCA may refer to:

Organisations:

- Independent Police Conduct Authority, New Zealand
- Indian Pharmaceutical Combine Association
- Indo-Pacific Conservation Alliance
- International Prison Chaplains' Association
- Polytechnic Institute of Cávado and Ave (Instituto Politécnico do Cávado e do Ave), Portugal

Fiction:

- International Presidential Consulting Agency, in the video game series Syphon Filter

== See also ==
- ACPI, misspelling in some MSI BIOSes
