= Omanesep =

- Village
- Location of Omanesep in South Papua
- Coordinates: 5°55′47″S 138°20′28″E
- Country: Indonesia
- Province: South Papua
- Regency: Asmat
- District: Betcbamu
- Climate: Af

Omanesep (also spelled Omandesep) is a village in Asmat Regency, South Papua, Indonesia. Omandesep is situated to the south of the villages of Agats and Atsy.
