= Otsjanep =

Otsjanep Ocenep, Acenep
- Village
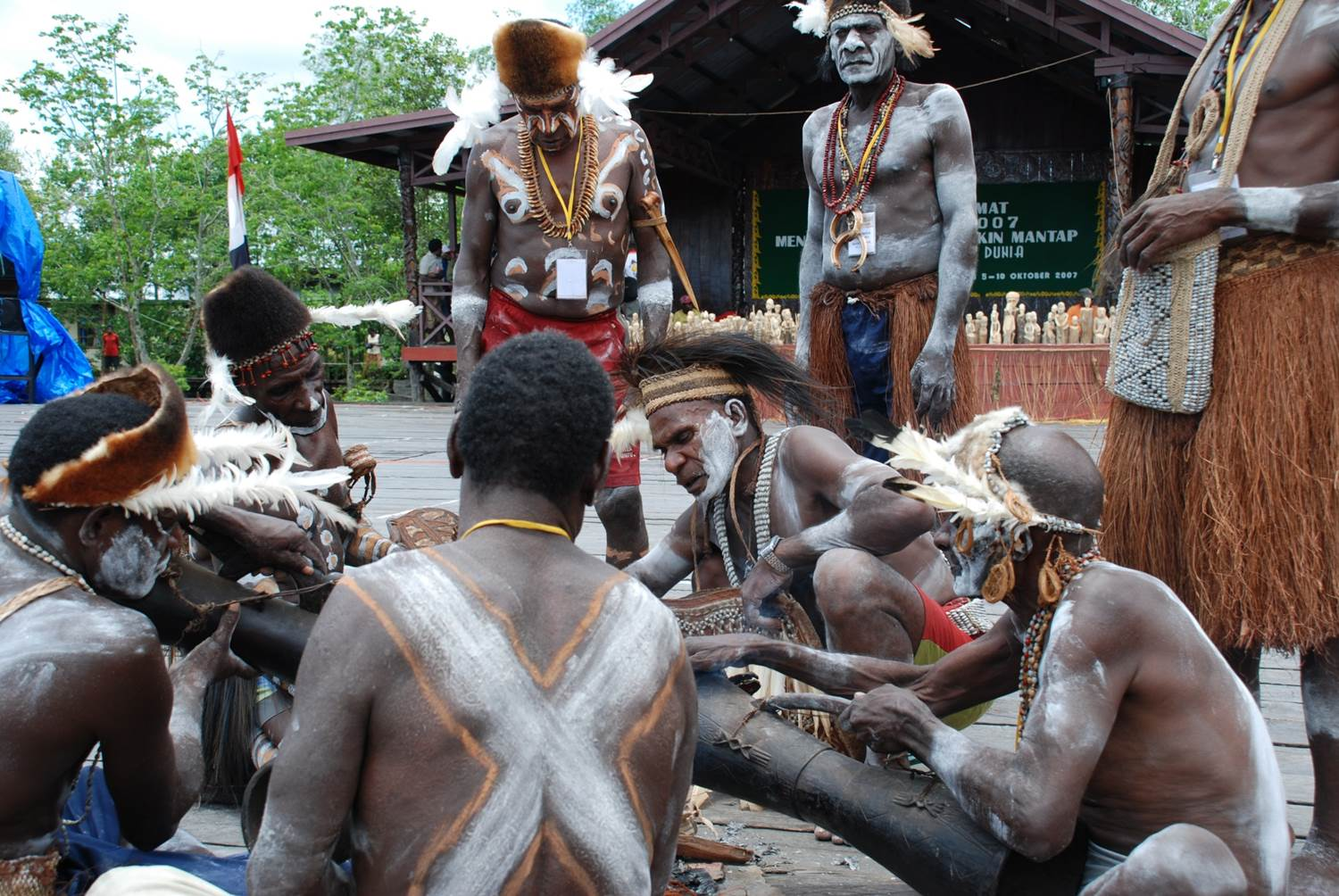
- Asmat people performing traditional wood carving.

- Location in South Papua Location of Otsjanep in Western New Guinea
- Coordinates: 5°58′42.5″S 138°21′26.7″E
- Country: Indonesia
- Province: South Papua
- Regency: Asmat
- District: Fayit
- Climate: Af

Otsjanep or Ocenep is a village in Asmat Regency, South Papua, Indonesia. The village is located on the bank of the Ewa river at the far north end of Indonesia's Casuarina Coast, named for its casuarina trees but now disappearing due to logging. Otsjanep is renowned for its wood carving. The locals continue to wear traditional clothes, but the village has a modern missionary church and – unusual in this area – grass lawns. It is part of a larger settlement consisting of Isar, Pirien, Kayarpis, and Bakyor in Fayit District.

The village has been speculated to be connected with the disappearance of Michael Rockefeller, son of U.S. Vice President Nelson Rockefeller, who vanished during an expedition in the region in 1961. In the documentary film Keep the River on Your Right, Tobias Schneebaum states that he spoke with some Asmat villagers at Otsjanep, who described finding Rockefeller on the riverside and eating him. In his 2014 book Savage Harvest, author Carl Hoffman presented evidence that Michael Rockefeller, son of U.S. Vice President Nelson Rockefeller, was killed and eaten by people from Otsjanep.
