= Michael Rockefeller =

American anthropologist and art collector (1938–1961)

- Rockefeller in 1961
- Born: Michael Clark Aldrich Nelson Rockefeller; May 18, 1938
- Disappeared: November 19, 1961 (aged 23); Asmat region of southwestern Dutch New Guinea
- Status: Missing and legally declared dead in 1964
- Education: Harvard University (AB)
- Parents: Nelson Rockefeller; Mary Clark
- Relatives: Rockefeller family

Michael Clark Rockefeller (May 18, 1938; disappeared November 19, 1961) was an American anthropologist and art collector and member of the Rockefeller family. He was a son of New York Governor and later U.S. Vice President Nelson Rockefeller, a grandson of American financier John D. Rockefeller Jr., and a great-grandson of Standard Oil co-founder John D. Rockefeller Sr.

In 1961, Rockefeller disappeared during an expedition in the Asmat region of southwestern Dutch New Guinea, which is now a part of the Indonesian province of South Papua, with conflicting views of his fate. Rockefeller's twin sister, Mary Rockefeller Morgan, wrote in a 2012 memoir that she believes her brother drowned. In 2014, Carl Hoffman published a book that included details from the official inquest into the disappearance, in which villagers and tribal elders stated that Rockefeller had been killed and eaten, after swimming to shore in 1961. No remains of Rockefeller or physical proof of his death have been discovered.

== Early life ==
Michael Rockefeller was born on May 18, 1938, the fifth and last child of Nelson and Mary Todhunter Rockefeller. He was the third son of seven children fathered by Nelson, and he had a twin sister named Mary. Rockefeller attended the Buckley School in New York City and graduated from the Phillips Exeter Academy in New Hampshire, where he was a student senator and exceptional varsity wrestler. He then graduated cum laude from Harvard University with an A.B. in history and economics. He also served for six months in 1960 as a private in the United States Army.

Following his military service, Rockefeller went on an expedition for Harvard's Peabody Museum of Archaeology and Ethnology to study the Dani tribe of western Dutch New Guinea. The expedition filmed Dead Birds, an ethnographic documentary film produced by Robert Gardner, for which Rockefeller was the sound recordist.

Rockefeller and a friend briefly left the Peabody expedition to study the Asmat tribe of southern Dutch New Guinea. After the expedition ended, Rockefeller returned to New Guinea to study the Asmat and collect their distinctive woodwork art.

"It's the desire to do something adventurous," he explained, "at a time when frontiers, in the real sense of the word, are disappearing."

Rockefeller spent his time in New Guinea actively engaged with the culture and the art while recording ethnographic data. In one of his letters back home, he wrote:

I am having a thoroughly exhausting but most exciting time here ... The Asmat is like a huge puzzle with the variations in ceremony and art style forming the pieces. My trips are enabling me to comprehend (if only in a superficial, rudimentary manner) the nature of this puzzle ...

== Disappearance ==
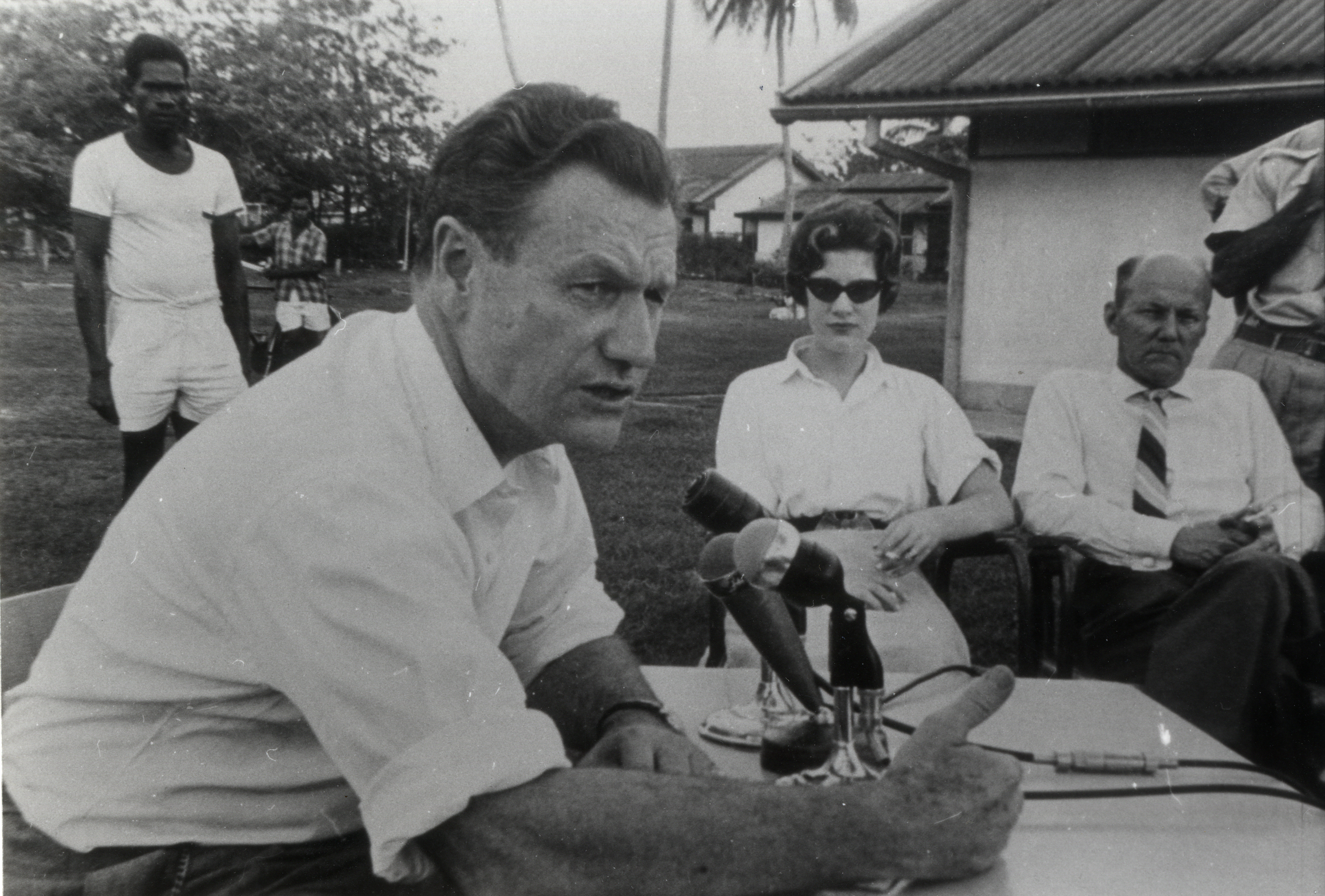
Nelson Rockefeller holds a press conference in Merauke, Indonesia, about the disappearance of his son Michael

On November 17, 1961, Rockefeller and Dutch anthropologist René Wassing were in a 40-foot (12 m) dugout canoe about 5–10 nautical miles (9.3–18.5 km; 5.8–11.5 mi) from shore when their double pontoon boat was swamped and overturned. Their two local guides, Simon and Leo, swam for help, but it was slow in coming. After drifting for some time, early on November 19, Rockefeller said to Wassing: "I think I can make it." According to Wassing, Rockefeller created a float for himself out of a jerry can and the boat's gas tank, took a compass and knife, and set off for the shore between 7 and 8 a.m. on November 19. Wassing's last sight of him was about 30 minutes later: "I saw him in a straight line going towards shore until I just saw three dots: the two cans and his head".

Wassing was rescued the next day by Sagala and Yatich, but Rockefeller was never seen again, despite an intensive and lengthy search effort. According to Rockefeller's surviving twin Mary Rockefeller Morgan, who accompanied her father to South Papua to participate in the search for her brother, "The Dutch and Australian naval and air units had been sending out helicopters and boats to participate in the search, along with the local Dutch control officers. And many of the Asmat villagers were valiantly combing the small rivers in their canoes for some evidence of Michael". At the time, his disappearance was major international news. His body was never found, and he was declared legally dead in 1964.

== Speculation ==
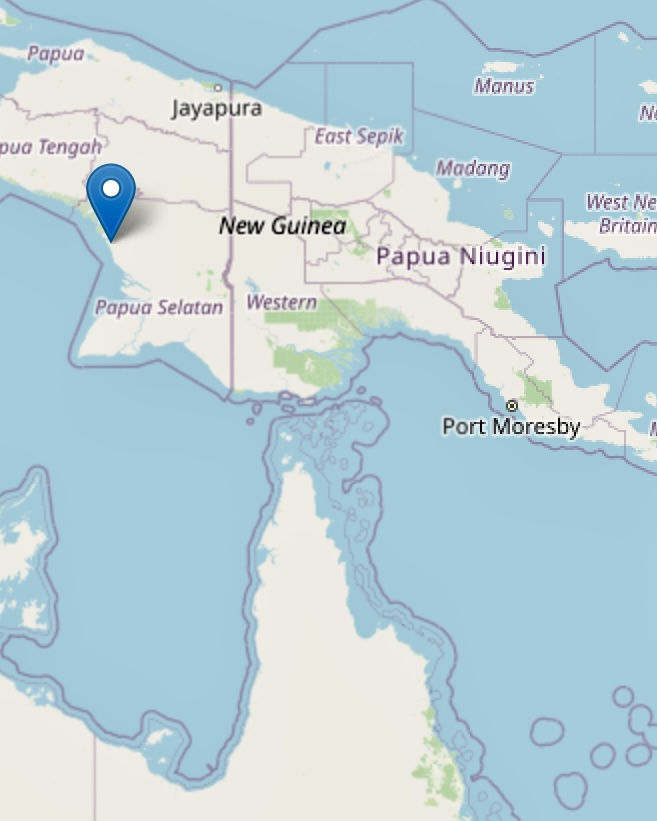
Location of Otsjanep, Asmat Regency, South Papua, Indonesia

It was originally reported that Rockefeller either drowned or was attacked by an animal, such as a shark or saltwater crocodile. The boat was an estimated 12 nmi (22 km; 14 mi) from the shore when Rockefeller made the attempt to swim to safety, supporting the theory that he died from exposure, exhaustion, or drowning.

However, because headhunting and cannibalism were still present in some areas of Asmat in 1961, there has also been widespread speculation based around local testimony that Rockefeller was killed and eaten by tribespeople from the Asmat village of Otsjanep.

Two Dutch missionaries, who were fluent in local languages and who had been living in the area for years, accumulated a large amount of testimony from witnesses. The account repeated by a number of villagers was that Rockefeller was pulled out of the water wearing underwear, and despite a dispute about whether or not he should be killed, he was non-fatally stabbed in the abdomen and later died somewhere along the Jawor River.

In December 1961, four locals told minister Hubertus von Peij that Rockefeller's remains and personal effects, including his head, long bones, ribs, shorts, and glasses, had been divided amongst 15 Asmats. Von Peij and missionary Cornelius van Kessel both wrote the same regional supervisor, repeating nearly identical accounts with myriad supporting details from residents of four separate villages in the vicinity. Both ministers expressed a very high degree of certainty that Rockefeller had been killed by local warriors. The motive for killing him was revenge for the killing of five Otsjanep residents, Faratsjam, Osom, Akon, Samut, and Ipi, by Dutch colonial soldiers under administrator Max Lapré, who opened fire on the villagers in January 1958.

The first public report that Rockefeller was killed and dismembered, and his long bones turned into weapons and fishing equipment, was published by the Associated Press in March 1962. A second investigation later that year by a patrolman named Wim van de Waal on behalf of Dutch colonial government came to the same conclusion. Van de Waal was given a "skull bearing no lower jaw and a hole in the right temple—the hallmarks of remains that had been headhunted and opened to consume the brains" which he turned over to Dutch authorities, who never asked him to write a written report and never asked him to verbally report his conclusion. The information was apparently deemed politically sensitive, in part because of the fragile state of the Dutch empire in the Indonesian archipelago and in part because of Nelson Rockefeller's political celebrity in the United States. The findings of van de Waal's investigation are restated in the written memoir of Anton van de Wouw, a successor missionary to van Kessel.

In 1969, journalist Milt Machlin traveled to the island to investigate Rockefeller's disappearance. He dismissed reports of Rockefeller living as a captive or as a Kurtz-like figure in the jungle, but concluded that circumstantial evidence supported the idea that he had been killed. Neither cannibalism nor headhunting in Asmat were indiscriminate, but rather were part of an eye-for-an-eye revenge cycle, so it is possible that Rockefeller found himself the victim of such a cycle. Under the Asmat belief system, several of the killers, named Fin, Ajim, Pep, Jane, Samut, would have had "sacred obligation to avenge the deaths of the men killed by Lepré".

In the 2000 documentary film Keep the River on Your Right, Tobias Schneebaum states that he spoke with some Asmat villagers at Otsjanep, who described finding Rockefeller on the riverside and eating him.

In 2012, Michael's surviving twin sister Mary published a memoir, titled Beginning with the End: A Memoir of Twin Loss and Healing, about coping with her grief after the death of her brother. The book was issued in paperback in 2014 as When Grief Calls Forth the Healing.

In 2014, Mary Rockefeller Morgan wrote of her twin brother's disappearance:

Rumors and stories of Michael's having made it to shore—of his having been found, captured, and killed by headhunting Asmat villagers—have persisted for more than forty years. Even today, those conjectures fuel the imagination and help to line the pockets of storytellers, playwrights, filmmakers, and the high-adventure tourist trade. None of them have been substantiated by any concrete evidence. Since 1954 the Dutch government had enforced a ban forbidding tribal warfare and the resulting headhunting that would avenge the death of an important tribal figure. In 1961 we were told that tribal warfare and headhunting had not been eradicated but were rare. All the evidence, based on the strong offshore currents, the high seasonal tides, and the turbulent outgoing waters, as well as the calculations that Michael was approximately ten miles from shore when he began to swim, supports the prevailing theory that he drowned before he was able to reach land.

— When Grief Calls Forth the Healing: A Memoir of Losing a Twin by Mary Rockefeller Morgan

=== 2014 book on his disappearance ===
In 2014, Carl Hoffman published the book Savage Harvest: A Tale of Cannibals, Colonialism, and Michael Rockefeller's Tragic Quest for Primitive Art, in which he discusses researching Rockefeller's disappearance and presumed death. During multiple visits to the villages in the area, Hoffman heard several stories about men from Otsjanep killing Rockefeller after he had swum to shore. The stories, which were similar to testimonials collected in the 1960s, center around a handful of men arguing and eventually deciding to kill Rockefeller in revenge for the 1958 incident. Soon afterward, the villages were swept by a cholera epidemic, which villagers believed was retribution for Rockefeller's death. As Hoffman left one of the villages for the final time, he witnessed a man acting out a scene wherein someone was killed, and he stopped to videotape it. When translated, the man was quoted as saying:

Don't you tell this story to any other man or any other village, because this story is only for us. Don't speak. Don't speak and tell the story. I hope you remember it and you must keep this for us. I hope. I hope. This is for you and you only. Don't talk to anyone, forever; to other people or another village. If people question you, don't answer. Don't talk to them, because this story is only for you. If you tell it to them, you'll die. I am afraid you will die. You'll be dead; your people will be dead, if you tell this story. You keep this story in your house; to yourself, I hope, forever. Forever.

== Asmat artifacts and photographs ==
Many of the Asmat artifacts Rockefeller collected are part of the Michael C. Rockefeller Wing collection at the Metropolitan Museum of Art in New York. The Peabody Museum has published the catalogue of an exhibition of pictures taken by Rockefeller during their New Guinea expedition.

== Memorial ==
There is a memorial stained glass window for Michael Rockefeller, designed by the artist Marc Chagall, installed at Union Church of Pocantico Hills. Rockefeller's twin Mary became a therapist in later life and following 9/11 led a bereavement support group for survivors who had lost their twins in the 2001 terrorist attacks on New York and Washington, D.C.

== In media ==
Rockefeller was referenced in the 2007 film Welcome to the Jungle.

== See also ==
- List of people who disappeared mysteriously: 1910–1990

== Sources ==
- Morgan, Mary Rockefeller (2014). When Grief Calls Forth the Healing: A Memoir of Losing a Twin. New York: Open Road. ISBN 978-1-4976-5208-8.
