= Bisj Pole =

Type of Asmat ritual artefact

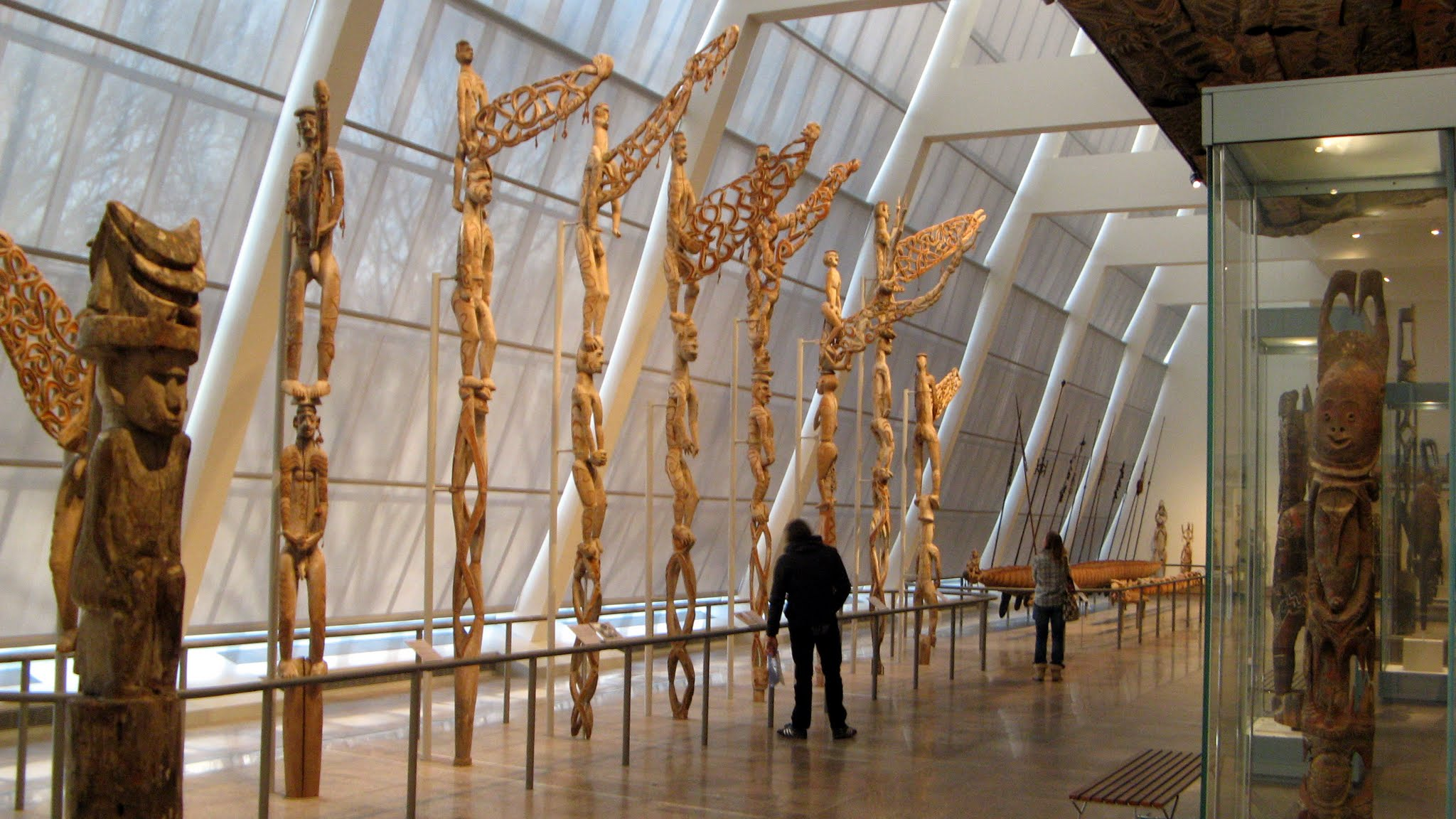
Asmat Bis Poles from New Guinea, Indonesia

A Bisj, Mbis or Bis pole is a ritual artifact created and used by the Asmat people of South-western New Guinea, Indonesia. They are also common in New Zealand, Vanuatu (formerly the New Hebrides).

When a village has experienced a number of deaths a Bisfeast is held. To commemorate the deceased members, a Bisj Pole is carved from a single mangrove tree. Bisj poles can also be erected as an act of revenge, to pay homage to the ancestors, to calm the spirits of the deceased, and to bring harmony and spiritual strength to the community.

== Production ==
Mangrove Trees are the traditional material to use for the making of Bisj Poles. The carver must first cut down the tree and strip the bark, releasing its red sap in the process. The wood is then delivered back to the village, where the villagers accept and treat the wood as an enemy corpse. After the Bisj Pole is fully carved, it is then hoisted outside the men's homes, as one would after the Headhunt raids. The pole is then abandoned in the Sago Palm groves, where it is used to fertilize the crops.

== Design ==
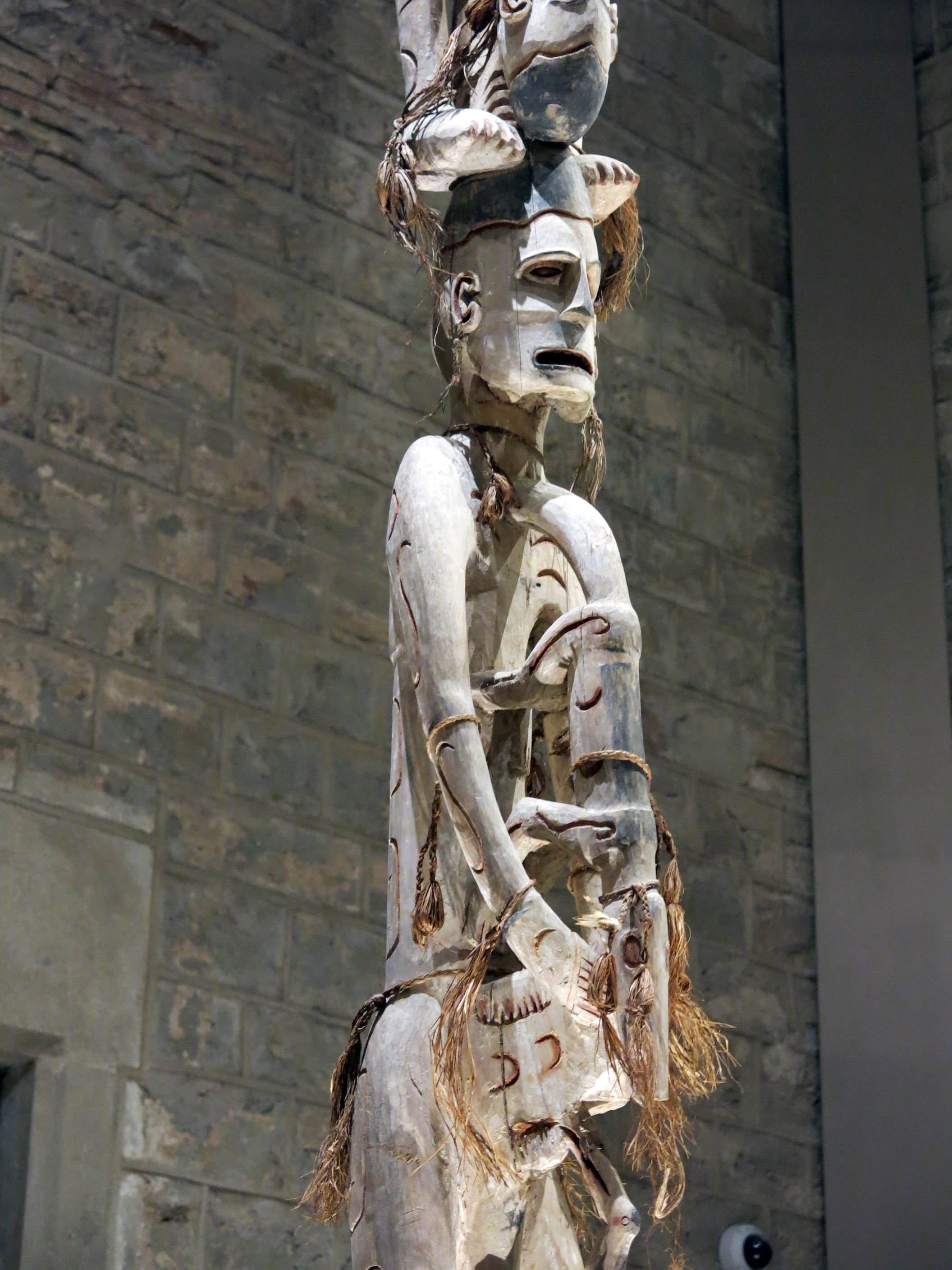
A close up of the Bisj Pole

Bisj Poles follow a long tradition of wood carvings within Asmat Art. The Asmat people believe wood is the source of life, and its relationship with humans are synonymous. Imagery of each pole varies, but typically revolve around ancestral models. The figures of the dead are stacked along the pole, and a Phallus symbol of fertility and power is included. The phallic symbols represented the strength and virility of the community's ancestors as well as of the warriors going on the headhunting mission. The human figures found on the poles would represent deceased ancestors. The Canoe prow symbols represented a metaphorical boat that would take the deceased spirits away to the afterlife. The human figures would represent deceased ancestors.

Religious Asmat iconography and mythology make up the appearance of the pole, but also includes the canoe-shaped bottom, which is commonly found in Oceanian art. This could also reference the Ci', or "Dugout Canoe" in Asmat people plays an integral part to their daily life, as the Papua Province is swampy. Carved out of a single piece of a wild mangrove tree, Bisj poles can reach heights of up to 25 feet (7.62 m). Scale is important to the creation of Bisj Poles, as the tallest height has been thirty feet long. Their carvings depict human figures standing on top of each other, as well as animal figures, phallic symbols, and carvings in the shape of a canoe prow.

== Purpose ==
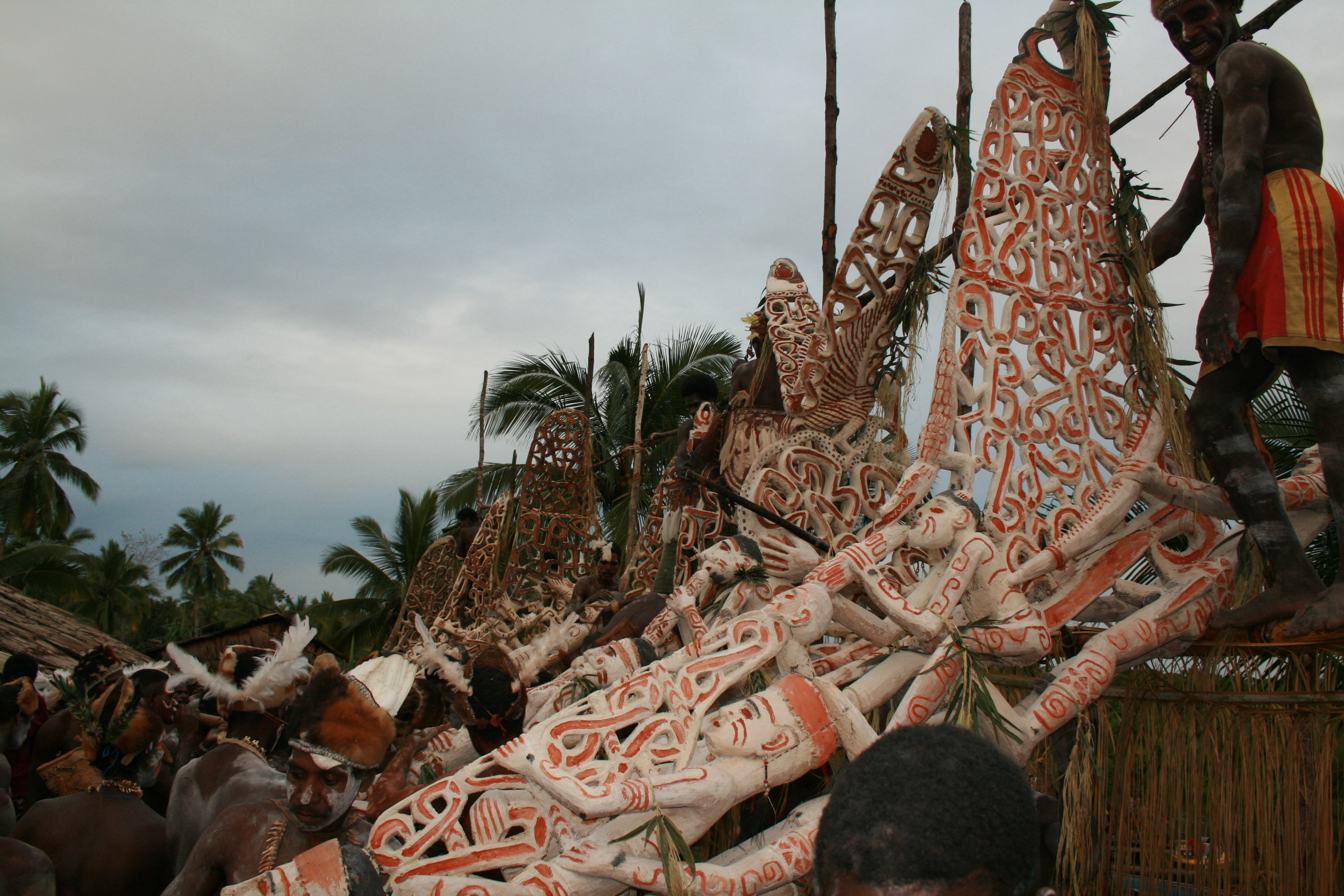
An Asmat Omandecep Bisj Ceremony

Bisj poles are carved by Asmat religious carvers (wow-ipits) after a member of their tribe or community had been killed and headhunted by an enemy tribe. The Asmat participated in headhunting raids and cannibalism as rituals.

The Asmat believed that if a member of the community had been headhunted, his spirit would linger in the village and cause disharmony. When death occurs within a community, it threatens the spiritual peace that the Asmat people believe. Bisj poles were erected in order to satisfy these spirits and send them to the afterlife (Safan) across the sea.

To avenge their fallen, a headhunt is held toward an enemy village in exchange. The Asmat often participated in headhunting raids and cannibalism as rituals. The headhunting tradition is no longer active, as it ended in the 1990s. Initially, the poles were traditionally carved to accompany the Bisfeast after a headhunting raid, and although headhunting is no longer practiced, the Bisj tradition continues to the present time as a customary practice to honor deceased members of a village.

Many rituals involved the Bisj poles, including dancing, masquerading, singing and headhunting—all performed by men. Bisj poles often had a receptacle at the base that was meant to hold the heads of enemies taken on headhunting missions.

== See also ==
- Arborglyph
- Dendroglyph
- Dol hareubang
- Headstone
- Huabiao
- Jangseung
- Khachkar
- Lingam
- Megalith
- Memento mori
- Menhir
- Moai
- Mundha
- Picture stone
- Poles in mythology
- Runestone
- Stele
- Totem poles
