= Lembaga Musyawarah Adat Asmat =

Lembaga Musyawarah Adat Asmat or LMAA is a grassroots community organization in the Asmat region in the southwestern coast of Papua, a province of Indonesia, located on the island of New Guinea.

The name of the organization can be loosely translated as the Asmat Traditional Assembly. LMAA represents and articulates the interests of the Asmat community in promoting self-reliance, self-governance, and sustainable economic development.

== Administration ==
Mr. Yufen Biakai is Chairman of LMAA, Mr. Amandus Anakat is vice-chairman, Ernest Dicim is Treasurer, and Wiro Birif is Secretary. LMAA consists of representatives of FAR Sub-Councils (Forum Adat Rumpun), each representing the twelve different sub-regions of Asmat. These sub-regions include Joirat, Emari Ducur, Bismam, Becembub, Simai, Kenekap, Unir Siran, Unir Epmak, Safan, Aramatak, Bras, and Yupmakcain.
