= Carl Hoffman =

American journalist and author (born 1960)

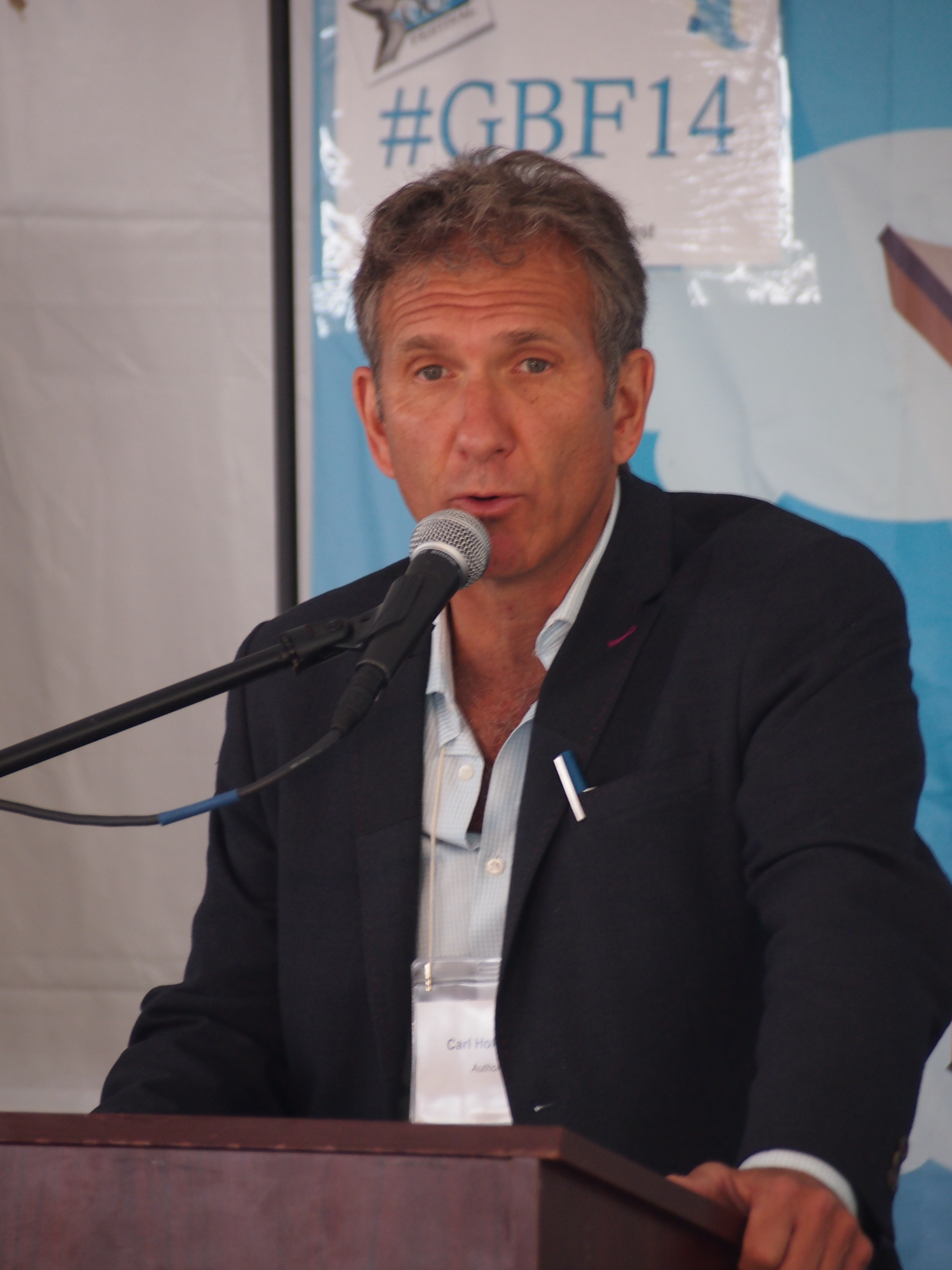
- Hoffman, 2014
- Born: May 4, 1960 (age 66); Washington, D.C., United States
- Education: Bachelor of Arts
- Alma mater: University of Massachusetts Amherst (B.A., 1983)
- Occupations: Journalist, author
- Website: carlhoffman.com

Carl Hoffman (born 1960) is an American journalist and the author of five books of narrative non-fiction.

== Biography ==
Carl Hoffman is a second generation native of Washington, D.C., a graduate of the District of Columbia public schools.

Hoffman is the author of five narrative non-fiction books about his own journeys and those of other contemporary travelers and explorers. Hoffman is a former contributing editor at Wired magazine, National Geographic Traveler, and Popular Mechanics, and has published articles in Outside, Smithsonian, Men’s Journal, National Geographic Adventure, The New York Times Magazine, The Washington Post, Popular Mechanics and many others. Hoffman has traveled to Afghanistan, Sudan, Congo, New Guinea, Greenland, Mongolia, Russia, China, Indonesia and more than 80 other countries on assignment

== Books ==
Liar's Circus: A Strange and Terrifying Journey Into the Upside-Down World Of Trump's MAGA Rallies (2020) journeys deep inside Donald Trump's rallies, seeking to understand the strange and powerful tribe that forms the president's base.

The Last Wild Men of Borneo: A True Story of Death and Treasure (2018) is a dual biography of Swiss rain forest activist Bruno Manser and American hippie Michael Palmieri, who traveled throughout Borneo collecting its tribal art. It explores the theme of Western fascination with indigenous cultures and the interplay between them.

In Savage Harvest: A Tale of Cannibals, Colonialism, And Michael Rockefeller's Tragic Quest, (2014) Hoffman set out to untangle what happened to Michael Clark Rockefeller, the son of New York Governor Nelson Rockefeller, who vanished in 1961. Hoffman learned to speak Bahasa Indonesia and lived in a remote village amid 10,000 square miles of road-less swamp with the Asmat, a tribe of former headhunters and cannibals on the southwest coast of New Guinea.

In The Lunatic Express: Discovering the World Via Its Most Dangerous Buses, Boats, Trains, and Planes (2010), he traveled 50,000 miles around the world on its most dangerous conveyances, including by bus across Afghanistan and through the Gobi desert on a 20-ton propane truck.

Hunting Warbirds: The Obsessive Quest for the Lost Airplanes of World War II (2001), recounts the three-year effort to recover the World War II era B-29 bomber, Kee Bird, from northern Greenland.

== Awards and honors ==
Hoffman has won seven Lowell Thomas Awards from the Society of American Travel Writers Foundation and three North American Travel Journalism Awards.

Liar's Circus was one of Kirkus Reviews 100 best books of 2020 and won a silver medal from the Society of American Travel Writers for Best Travel Book of 2020.

The Last Wild Men of Borneo was shortlisted in 2019 for an Edgar Award for Best Fact Crime Fiction and was a Banff Mountain Book Award finalist.

Savage Harvest was a New York Times Editors' Choice, a New York Times bestseller, was included in Amazon Editors' Picks for the 100 Best Books of 2014, The Washington Post as one of its 50 notable non-fiction books of the year, it was among the Kirkus Reviews "Best Books" of 2014 and it was shortlisted for the 2015 Edgar Award in the "Best Fact Crime" category. It has been translated into eight languages.

The Lunatic Express was named one of the ten best books of 2010 by The Wall Street Journal.

== Works ==
- Carl Hoffman (2018). The Last Wild Men of Borneo: A True Story of Death and Treasure. William Morrow. ISBN 978-0062439024.
- Carl Hoffman (2014). Savage Harvest: A Tale of Cannibals, Colonialism and Michael Rockefeller's Tragic Quest for Primitive Art. William Morrow. ISBN 9780062116161.
- Carl Hoffman (2010). The Lunatic Express: Discovering the World Via Its Most Dangerous Buses, Boats, Trains and Planes. Ballantine Books. ISBN 9780767929813.
- Carl Hoffman (2001). Hunting Warbirds: The Obsessive Quest for the Lost Airplanes of World War II. Broadway Books. ISBN 9780345436184.
