= Indo-Pacific Conservation Alliance =

- Abbreviation: IPCA
- Formation: December 1998; 27 years ago
- Type: Nonprofit
- Tax ID no.: 52-2139780
- Legal status: 501(c)(3)
- Headquarters: Honolulu, Hawaii
- Region served: Indo-Pacific region
- Board Chair: John Burke Burnett
- Executive Director: Dr. Allen Allison
- Website: https://www.indopacific.org/

Indo-Pacific Conservation Alliance or IPCA, is a nonprofit corporation headquartered in Honolulu, Hawaii, that seeks to protect plant and animal diversity in wilderness areas and marine regions in the tropical Indo-Pacific region, including Indonesia, Melanesia, Micronesia, and Polynesia.

== Establishment ==
IPCA was founded in 1998 in collaborative association with scientists at the Bishop Museum, Smithsonian Institution, World Bank, and other institutions. It was established to act in alliance with, and to work through, existing in-country institutions as much as possible in order to reduce costs and build local capacity.

== Activities ==
Its main programs are currently based in the Indonesian province of Papua (western New Guinea), working with local communities such as the Asmat to help them achieve sustainable development and protect their rainforests and biodiversity. IPCA provides information, training, equipment and other support to stakeholders to help them conserve and manage their natural resources. IPCA also carries out scientific surveys to document biodiversity, how local people value and use those resources, and how it is impacted by threats such as commercial fishing, logging, and invasive species.

== Mission statement ==
The Indo-Pacific Conservation Alliance is dedicated to the study and conservation of the native ecosystems of the tropical Indo-Pacific region and support for traditional peoples in their stewardship of these globally significant natural resources.

== Administration ==
John Burke Burnett has served as the Indo-Pacific Conservation Alliance's Executive Director since its founding. Dr. Allen Allison of the Bishop Museum is Chairman.
