= Piet Drabbe =

Dutch linguist and ethnographer

- Born: Petrus Drabbe; 4 June 1887; Heino, Netherlands
- Died: October 22, 1970 (aged 83); Arnhem, Netherlands
- Occupations: Linguist, anthropologist, and missionary

Academic work
- Main interests: Papuan languages and ethnography
- Notable works: Het leven van den Tanémbarees (1940)

Piet Drabbe (born Petrus Drabbe in Heino, Netherlands, June 4, 1887; died in Arnhem, Netherlands, October 27, 1970) was a member of the Missionaries of the Sacred Heart who worked successively from 1912 to 1960 in the Philippines, the Tanimbar Islands, and on the southern coast of Dutch New Guinea, now the Indonesian province of Papua.

== Biography ==
Born Petrus Drabbe in Heino, Netherlands on June 4, 1887, he was the son of a teacher. Piet Drabbe attended the seminary in Tilburg and took his monastic vows at the age of 19. In 1911, he was ordained a priest. Since his childhood, he had dreamed of becoming a missionary in New Guinea, but he did not realize his dream until decades later.

In 1912 he was sent to Lipa, Batangas, Philippines, but shortly afterwards his congregation decided to leave the diocese. Drabbe was transferred to the Tanimbar Archipelago in 1915, where he would stay for 20 years. Only in 1935 could he go to Dutch New Guinea, where his congregation had the entire southern coast as a mission field. He stayed there for 25 years and was forced to repatriate in 1960 after falling victim to severe malaria and dysentery in 1959. He died 10 years later in Arnhem, Netherlands at the age of 83.

== Scientific research ==
Like the other priests of the Sacred Heart – including Petrus Vertenten, Jos van der Kolk, Henricus Geurtjens, and Jan Boelaars – Drabbe has conducted valuable linguistic and ethnological research. Het leven van den Tanémbarees (The life of the Tanimbarese), a lengthy monograph that appeared in 1940, continues to be one of the main sources on Tanimbar ethnography. Linguistics was also of great interest to Drabbe. Because of his talent for teaching and describing languages, he was appointed a "mission linguist" in New Guinea, which allowed him to extensively document various Papuan languages. He has thoroughly documented a number of languages and dialects of southern Dutch New Guinea. Petrus Drabbe's works remain the primary source for many languages of the southwestern coastal areas of New Guinea. In 1962, he received a Zilveren Anjer (Silver Carnation) medal from Prince Bernhard for his many years of linguistic research.

== Publications ==
- Het leven van den Tanémbarees; ethnographische studie over het Tanémbareesche volk. 1940. Leiden: E.J. Brill.
- Twee dialecten van de Awju-taal. Bijdragen tot de Taal-, Land- en Volkenkunde, 106: 93-147. 1950, 's-Gravenhage: Martinus Nijhoff.
- Talen en dialecten van Zuid-West Nieuw-Guinea 1 1950, Anthropos 45: 545–75.
- Spraakkunst van het Ekagi, Wisselmeren, Nederlands Nieuw Guinea, 1952, 's-Gravenhage: Martinus Nijhoff.
- Spraakkunst van de Kamoro-taal. 1953, 's-Gravenhage: Martinus Nijhoff.
- Talen en dialecten van Zuid-West Nieuw-Guinea. 1954, Micro-Bibliotheca Anthropos, vol. 11.
- Spraakkunst van het Marind, zuidkust Nederlands Nieuw-Guinea. 1955, Studia Instituti Anthropos, Vol. 11. Wien-Mödling: Missiehuis St. Gabriël.
- Spraakkunst van het Aghu-dialect van de Awju-taal. 1957, Koninklijk Instituut voor Taal-, Land- en Volkenkunde. 's-Gravenhage: Martinus Nijhoff.
- Kaeti en Wambon: twee Awju-dialecten. 1959, Koninklijk Instituut voor Taal-, Land- en Volkenkunde. 's-Gravenhage: Martinus Nijhoff.
- Drie Asmat-dialecten. 1963, Verhandelingen van het Koninklijk Instituut voor Taal-, Land- en Volkenkunde, No. 42. 's-Gravenhage: Martinus Nijhoff.
