= Asmat–Kamrau languages =

Family of languages

Asmat–Kamrau
- Geographic distribution: southern coast and Kamrau Bay of Indonesian New Guinea
- Ethnicity: Asmat people etc.
- Linguistic classification: Trans–New Guinea: Asmat–Mombum; Asmat–Kamrau
- Subdivisions: Kamrau (Sabakor); Asmat–Kamoro

Language codes
- Glottolog: asma1256
- Map: The Asmat–Kamrau languages of New Guinea The Asmat–Kamrau languages Other Trans–New Guinea languages Other Papuan languages Austronesian languages Uninhabited

The Asmat – Kamrau Bay languages are a family of a dozen Trans–New Guinea languages spoken by the Asmat and related peoples in southern Western New Guinea. They are believed to be a recent expansion along the south coast, as they are all closely related, and there is little differentiation in their pronouns.

== Languages ==
The languages are:

- Kamrau Bay (Sabakor):
  - Buruwai (Sabakor)
  - Kamrau
    - North Kamberau (Iria)
    - South Kamberau (Asienara)
- Asmat–Kamoro
  - Kamoro
  - Sempan
  - Asmat languages

== Proto-language ==
=== Phonemes ===
Usher (2020) reconstructs the consonant inventory as follows:

m	n		
p	[t]		k
b	[d]	ɟ	ɡ
[ɸ]	s		
w	r	j	

There is near complementary distribution between *p and *ɸ. *t and *d are marginal, appearing in only a few words. *r does not occur initially. There are no consonant clusters.

Vowels are *a *e *i *o *u.

=== Pronouns ===
Ross (2005) reconstructs the proto-Asmat–Kamoro pronouns as:

	sg	pl
1	*no[ro]	*na[re]
2	*o[ro]/we[rV]	*ca[re]
3	*a[re]

Usher (2020) reconstructs the free proto–Asmat–Kamrau Bay pronouns as:

Proto-Asmat–Kamrau
	sg	pl
1	*no-rV	*na-rV
2	*o-rV	*ɟa-rV
3	*a-rV	

Proto-Kamrau
	sg	pl
1	*nor	*nar
2	*or-or	*er-er
3	*ar-ar	

Proto-Asmat–Kamoro
	sg	pl
1	*no-ro	*na-rV
2	*o-ro	*ca-rV
3	*a-rV	

=== Basic vocabulary ===
Some lexical reconstructions by Usher (2020) are:

gloss	Proto-Asmat-Kamrau	Proto-Kamrau Bay	Proto-Asmat-Kamoro	Proto-Asmat	Proto-Muli Strait
head	*uɸu	*jebin	*ufu	*kowisi 'head/skull'	*ɣo̝p 'head/hair'; *uɔndVro̝m 'head/skull'
hair	*ɸini	*ɸin	*fini	*ɸinV 'hair/feather(s)'	*sin
ear	*jiɸ[a/o]ne	*jaɸ[a/o]m	*jafane	*jaɸane	*ie̝pær
eye	*manaN	*manam	*mana	*mana	*musiɣ
nose	*miC	*mik	*mi	*mi	*mæne̝ɣ 'nose/tip'
tooth	*siC	*sik	*sisi	*sisV	*ziɣ
tongue	*komane	*[a]mam	*komane	*komVne	*ndupæn
foot/leg	*mawu	*mawu	*mawu	*mawi	*kaŋg 'leg'
blood/red	*ese	*et	*ese		*ir 'blood'
fruit/seed/bone	*eake	*eke	*eake		
skin/bark		*ɸu	*pitini	*pitʲini	*par
breast	*awo	*awo	*awo		*abuɣ
louse	*amo	*om	*amo		*am
dog	*juwuɾi	*iwuɾ	*juwuri	*juwVɾi	*i[u]bui
pig	*oɸo	*ok	*ofo		*up
bird		*geɟ		*sakV	
egg	*[a]sa	*asa	*sa	*sa	
tree/wood	*ose	*o	*ose		*to̝ 'tree'
man/male		*bewu			*nam 'man/person'
woman	*ɟawoɟa	*jawoɟa	*cawoca	*jipitʲi	*ie̝t 'woman/wife'
sun	*jawu	*asi 'sun/day'	*jawu	*jawi	*zaua
moon	*buɾa	*buɾa	*pura	*piɾa	*irind
water	*m[oi/ui]	*moɟ	*mui	*mui	*mo̝i
fire/firewood	*usa	*usa	*usa	*jusa	*ua[nd/r] 'fire'
stone	*jeta	*eta	*j[e]ka		*mæte̝
path		*matoC; *mak	*mato		
name	*uwase	*u	*uwase	*juwase	*ur
eat/drink	*n[a]-	*n[a]-	*n[e/a]	*ne-	*no̝ku
one	*ɟawa[kV]	*-ɟawa	*cawak[e/a]	*tʲawaka	
two	*kaboma	*aboma	*kapoma; *jam[i/u]nV		

== Evolution ==
Proto-Asmat-Kamoro reflexes (Voorhoeve 2005) of proto-Trans-New Guinea (pTNG) etyma, as listed in Pawley & Hammarström (2018):

- *fiti 'fingernail' < pTNG *mb(i,u)t(i,u)C
- *isi 'mosquito' < *kasin
- *ese 'blood' < *kenja
- *masap or *masip 'saliva' < *si(mb,p)atV
- *yi 'urine' < *[si]si
- *asa 'excrement' < *asa
- *manaka 'eye' < *mun(a,e,i)ka
- *sisi 'tooth' < *(t,s)i(t,s)i
- *yirama 'night' < *k(i,u)tama
- *tama 'morning' < *k(i,u)tama
- *na- 'eat' < *na-

== Bibliography ==
- Drabbe, Piet. 1953. Spraakkunst van de Kamoro-taal. The Hague: Martinus Nijhoff.
- Drabbe, Piet. 1963. Drie Asmat-dialecten. Verhandelingen van het Koninklijk Instituut voor Taal-, Land- en Volkenkunde, No. 42. The Hague: Martinus Nijhoff.
- Ross, Malcolm (2005). "Pronouns as a preliminary diagnostic for grouping Papuan languages". In Andrew Pawley; Robert Attenborough; Robin Hide; Jack Golson (eds.). Papuan pasts: cultural, linguistic and biological histories of Papuan-speaking peoples. Canberra: Pacific Linguistics. pp. 15–66. doi:10.15144/PL-572. ISBN 0858835622. OCLC 67292782.
- Voorhoeve, C.L. 1965. The Flamingo Bay Dialect of the Asmat language. Verhandelingen van het Koninklijk Instituut voor Taal-, Land- en Volkenkunde, No. 46. The Hague. doi:10.26530/OAPEN_613367
- Voorhoeve, C.L. 1968. "The Central and South New Guinea Phylum: a report on the language situation in south New Guinea." Pacific Linguistics, Series A, No. 16: 1–17. Canberra: The Australian National University.
- Voorhoeve, C.L. 1975. Languages of Irian Jaya: Checklist, Preliminary Classification, Language Maps, Wordlists. Pacific Linguistics, Series B, No. 31. Canberra: The Australian National University.
- Voorhoeve, C.L. 1980. The Asmat Languages of Irian Jaya. Pacific Linguistics, Series B, No. 64. Canberra: The Australian National University.
- Wurm, Stephan Adolphe. 1983. The Papuan Languages of Oceania. Ars Linguistica 7. Tübingen: Narr.
