= Buruwai language =

Asmat–Kamoro language spoken in New Guinea

Buruwai
- Sabakor, Madewana
- Native to: Indonesia
- Region: Kaimana Regency, West Papua
- Native speakers: (1,000 cited 2000)
- Language family: Trans–New Guinea: Central and South; Asmat–Kamoro; Sabakor; Buruwai

Language codes
- ISO 639-3: asi
- Glottolog: buru1308

Buruwai, also known as Sabakor or Madewana, is an Asmat–Kamoro language spoken in Buruway District, Kaimana Regency, West Papua.
