= Asmat people =

Ethnic group of New Guinea

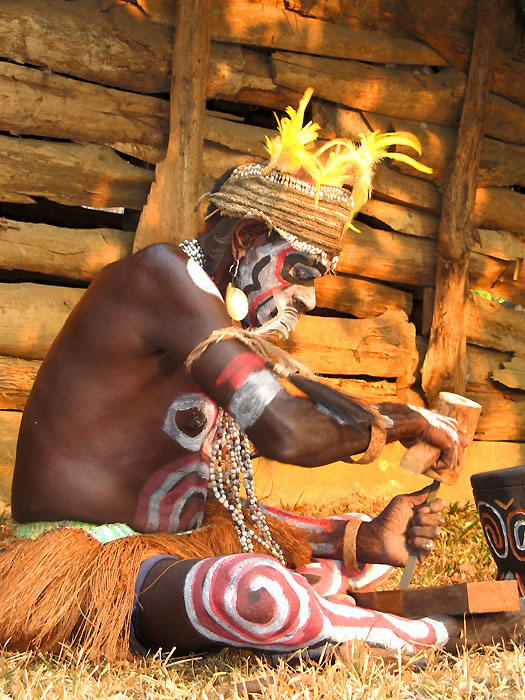
- An Asmat woodcarver

Total population
- 110,105 (2020)

Regions with significant populations
- Indonesia (Asmat Regency, South Papua)

Languages
- Asmat languages

Religion
- Majority: Catholicism Minority: Protestantism, Sunni Islam, Indigenous beliefs

Related ethnic groups
- Citak • Diuwe • Kamoro

The Asmat are an ethnic group of New Guinea, residing in the province of South Papua, Indonesia. The Asmat inhabit a region on the island's southwestern coast bordering the Arafura Sea, with lands totaling approximately 18,000 km^{2} (7,336 mi^{2}) and consisting of mangrove, tidal swamp, freshwater swamp, and lowland rainforest.

The land of Asmat is located both within and adjacent to Lorentz National Park, a World Heritage Site, the largest protected area in the Asia-Pacific region. The total Asmat population is estimated to be around 110,000 as of 2020. The term "Asmat" is used to refer both to the people and the region they inhabit.

The Asmat have an extensive woodcarving tradition in the Pacific, and their art is sought by collectors worldwide.

== Culture and subsistence ==
The natural environment has been a major factor affecting the Asmat, as their culture and way of life are heavily dependent on the rich natural resources found in their forests, rivers, and seas. The Asmat mainly subsist on starch from the sago palm (Metroxylon sagu), supplemented by grubs of the sago beetle (Rhynchophorus bilineatus), crustaceans, fish, forest game, and other items gathered from their forests and waters.

Materials for canoes, dwellings, and woodcarvings are also all gathered locally, and thus their culture and biodiversity are intertwined. Due to the daily flooding which occurs in many parts of their land, Asmat dwellings, jew, have typically been built two or more meters above the ground, raised on wooden posts. In some inland regions, the Asmat have lived in tree houses, sometimes as high as 25 meters from the ground. The Asmat have traditionally placed great emphasis on the veneration of ancestors, particularly those who were accomplished warriors.

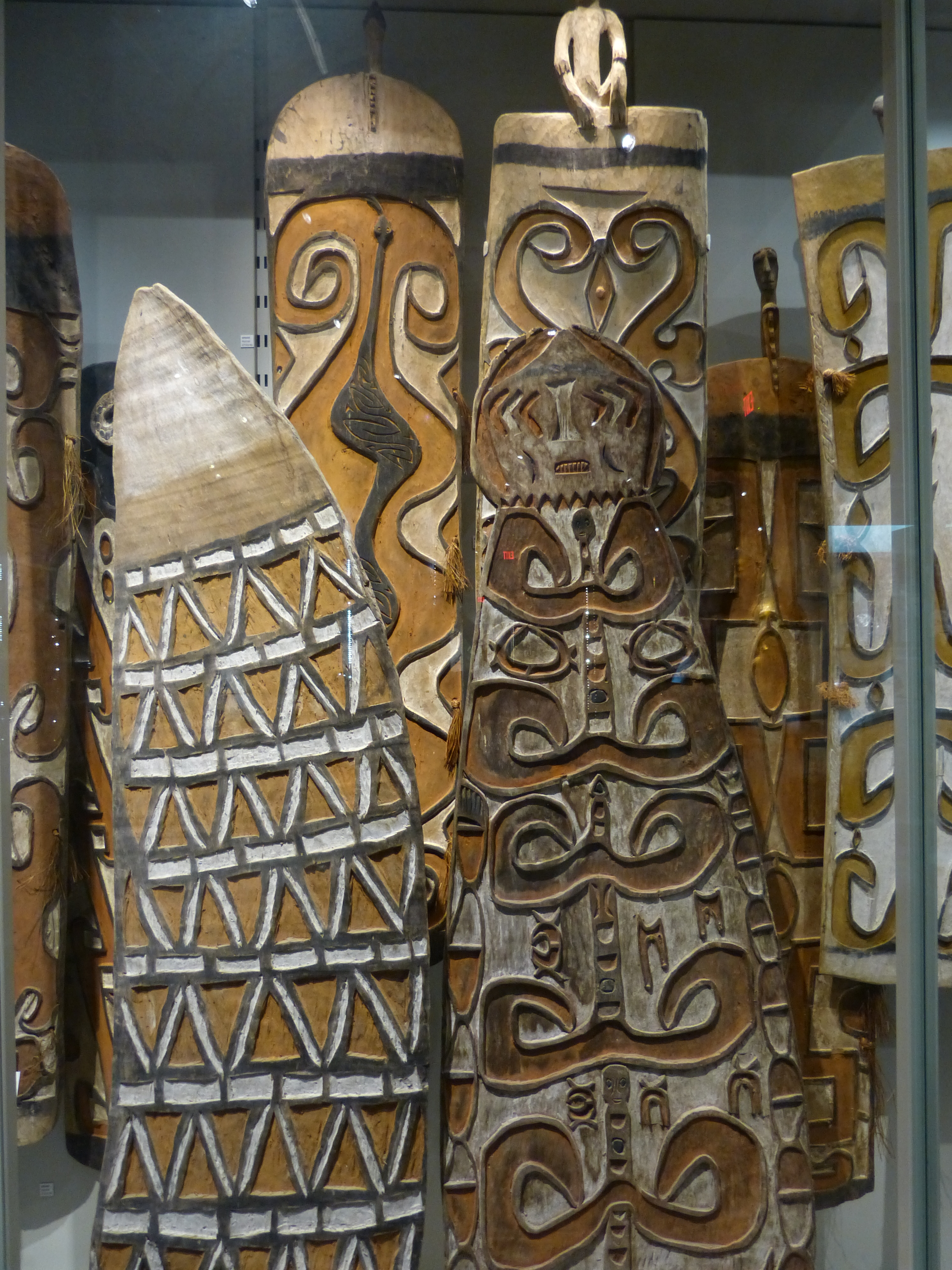
Asmat shields

Asmat art consists of elaborate stylized wood carvings such as the bisj pole and is designed to honour ancestors. Many Asmat artifacts have been collected by the world's museums, among the most notable of which are those found in the Michael C. Rockefeller Collection at the Metropolitan Museum of Art in New York City and the Tropenmuseum in Amsterdam. Asmat art is widely collected in major Western museums despite the difficulty in visiting the remote region to collect work; the "exceptionally expressive" art "caused a sensation in art-collecting circles" which led to large-scale collecting expeditions in the post-WWII era, according to art scholar and ethnologist Dirk A.M. Smidt. One of the most comprehensive collections of Asmat art can be found in the American Museum of Asmat Art at the University of St. Thomas in St. Paul, Minnesota.

Traditionally, many Asmat men practiced polygamy by marrying more than one woman. In many cases, men were expected to marry a male relative's wife when that relative dies, lest the widow and orphans be left without a source of protection or economic support. Schneebaum reported that many Asmat men had long-term ritual sexual/friendship relationships (mbai) with other men, although the prevalence of this practice has been disputed by others. In the mbai system, male partners were also known to share their wives in a practice called papitsj. It is probable that missionary influence in the last several decades has reduced the occurrence of both mbai and papitsj.

Headhunting raids were an important element of Asmat culture until missionaries suppressed the practice, which, according to some accounts, persisted into the 1990s. The death of an adult, even by disease, was believed to be caused by an enemy, and relatives sought to take a head in an endless cycle of revenge and propitiation of ancestors. Heads were thought necessary for the rituals in which boys were initiated into manhood. Cannibalism was a subsidiary feature of the rituals that followed the taking of heads.

== Language and ethnic sub-groups ==
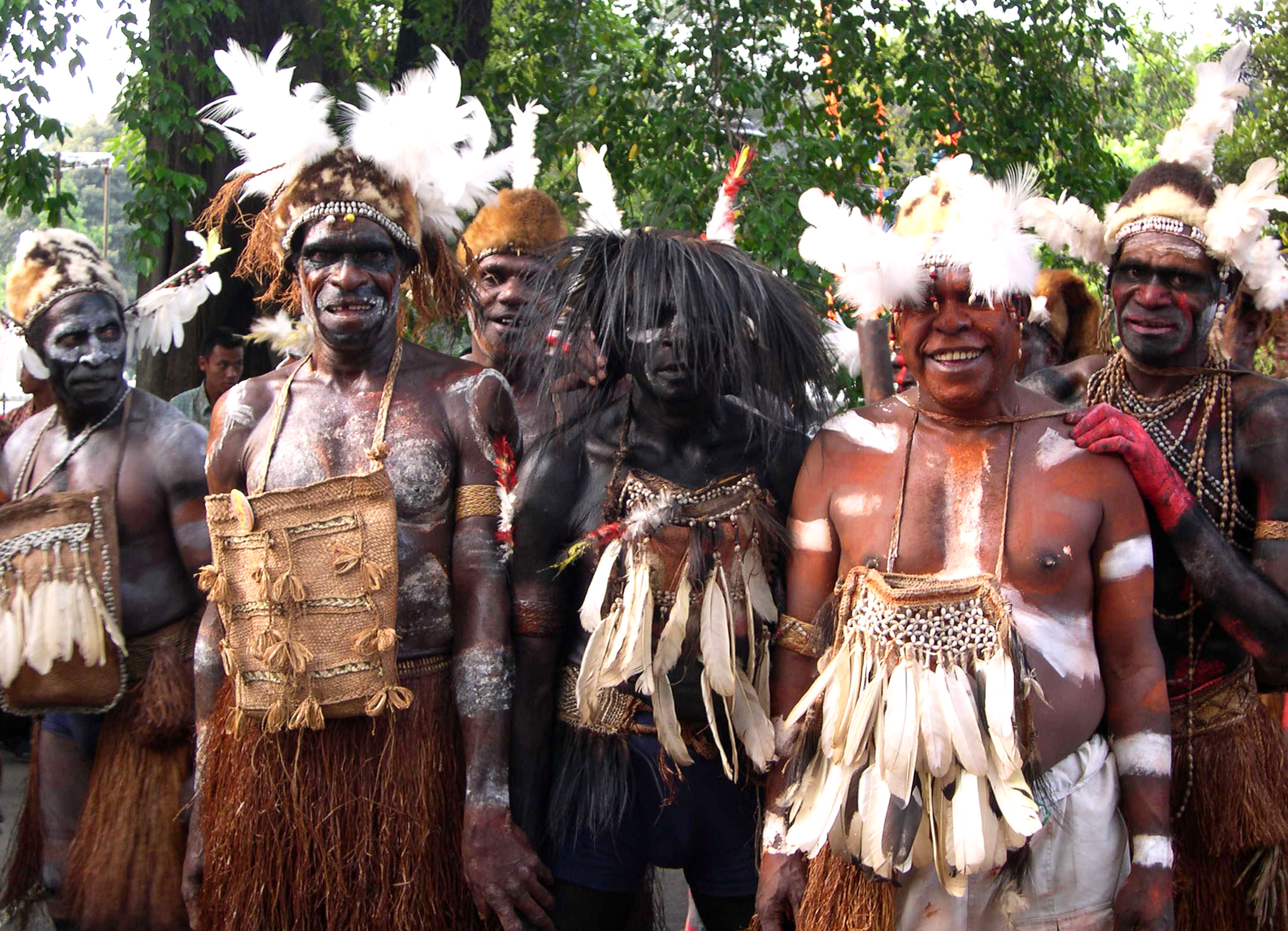
Asmat people in Jakarta Cultural Festival, 2006

Linguistic classification of the native language(s) of the Asmat people is somewhat problematic, but is generally characterized as being a group of closely related languages or dialects (most mutually intelligible to some degree), known as the Asmat family, which is a sub-family of the Trans–New Guinea language phylum. However, some ethnic groups who speak languages in the Asmat language family, such as the Kamoro and Sempan peoples who live adjacent to the Asmat, are ethnically distinct from Asmat.

Asmat may be thought of as an umbrella term for twelve different ethnic sub-groups with shared linguistic and cultural affinities and sense of shared identity. These twelve Asmat groups include Joirat, Emari Ducur, Bismam, Becembub, Simai, Kenekap/Kaimo, Unir Siran/Keenok, Unir Epmak/Tomor, Safan, Aramatak, Bras/Brazza, and Yupmakcain. Further complicating the issue, these groups speak approximately five or more dialects (Casuarina Coast Asmat, Yaosakor Asmat, Central Asmat, North Asmat, Tamnim, Citak). However, at some important level these groups share a sense of identity and would likely refer to themselves as "Asmat". The exception being the Citak (Yupmakcain and Brazza), who referred to themselves as "Kau" and considered themselves a separate tribe with different cultural practices, such as being matrilineal.

== History ==
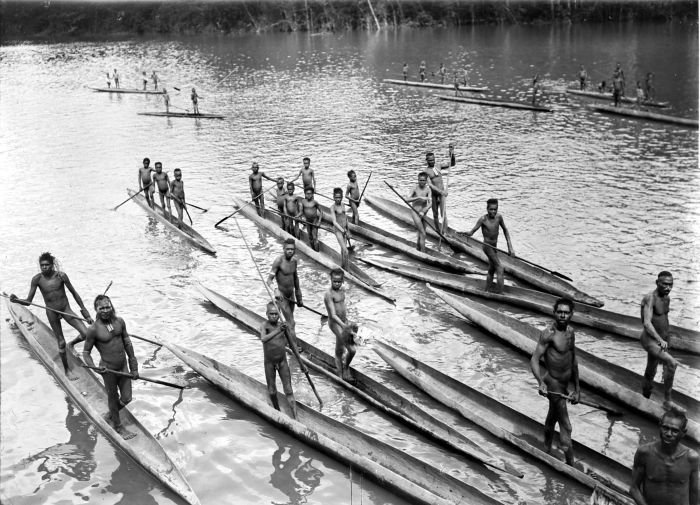
Asmat on the Lorentz River, photographed during the third South New Guinea expedition in 1912–13

The Asmat's first encounter with European people was with the Dutch, in 1623. However, until the 1950s, their remote and harsh location almost entirely isolated the Asmat from other ethnic groups. It was not until the mid-20th century that they came into regular contact with outsiders. The Asmat were documented headhunters and cannibals, and as a consequence were left largely undisturbed until then.

The first apparent sighting of the Asmat people by European explorers was from the deck of a ship led by a Dutch trader, Jan Carstensz in the year 1623. Captain James Cook and his crew were the first to land in Asmat on September 3, 1770 (near what is now the village of Pirimapun). According to the journals of Captain Cook, a small party from HM Bark Endeavour encountered a group of Asmat warriors; sensing a threat, the explorers quickly retreated.

In 1826, another Dutch explorer, Kolff, anchored in approximately the same area as that visited by Cook. When Asmat warriors approached the visitors with loud noises and bursts of white powder, Kolff's crew rapidly withdrew. The Dutch, who had gained sovereignty over the western half of the island in 1793, did not begin exploring the region until the early 1900s. At that time they established a government post in Merauke in the southeast corner of the territory.

From there, several exploratory excursions with the goal of reaching the central mountain range passed through the Asmat area and gathered small numbers of zoological specimens and artifacts. These artifacts were taken to Europe where they generated much interest, and probably influenced modernist Western artists such as Henri Matisse, Marc Chagall and Pablo Picasso.

=== Start of significant contact with the outside world ===
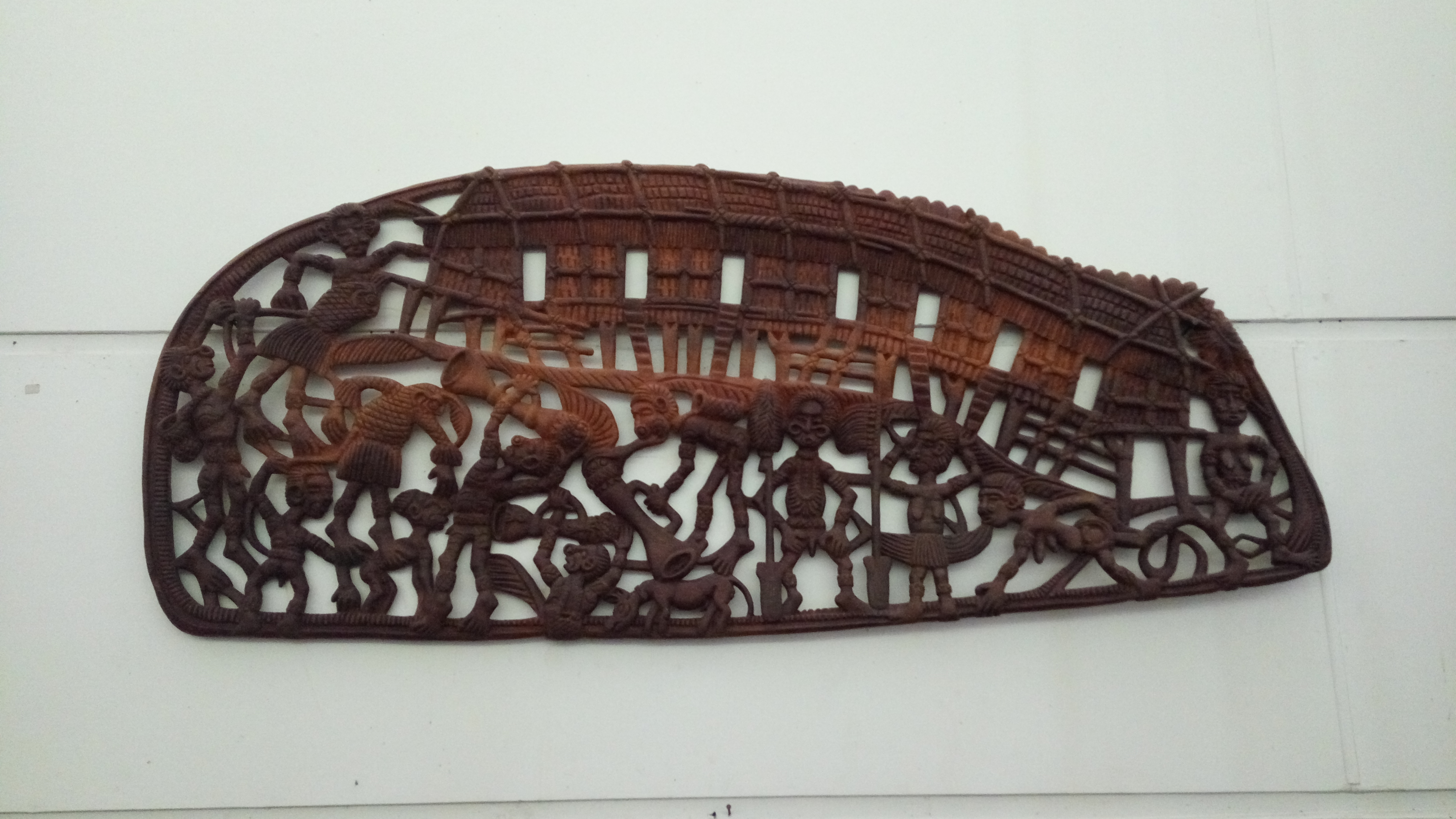
Asmat carving

The first colonial post was established in the Asmat area in Agats in 1938. This small outpost was closed in 1942 due to the onset of World War II. After the war, Father G. Zegwaard, a Dutch Missionary, began patrols into Asmat from the Mimika area to the west. In 1953, Zegwaard re-established the post in Agats, which was to become the government headquarters and the base for Roman Catholic missionaries.

It was not until Catholic missionaries established the post in 1953 that significant interaction with the Asmat people began. Catholic missionaries, many with degrees in anthropology, were partially successful in persuading some of the Asmat to stop cannibalism and headhunting, while encouraging the continuation of other important cultural cycles and festivals such as shield and bisj ceremonies, which were incorporated into an adapted Catholic liturgy.

Asmat was the launching point for an arduous joint French-Dutch expedition from the south to north coast of New Guinea in 1958 and 1959, which was documented by the team and resulted in a book and documentary film, The Sky Above, The Mud Below, which won an Academy Award in 1962.

In November 1961, the 23-year-old Michael Rockefeller, son of the then-Governor of New York Nelson Rockefeller and member of one of the wealthiest families in the United States, disappeared in Asmat when his boat overturned while on an art collecting expedition. His disappearance, followed by an intensive and ultimately unsuccessful search by the Dutch authorities, was the source of much speculation as to Mr. Rockefeller's fate. Author Carl Hoffman, in his book Savage Harvest, presented evidence that Rockefeller was killed and eaten by people from Otsjanep village.

In 1962, the Indonesian government took over administration of western New Guinea. After a short period under the new Indonesian administration from 1964 to 1968 in which Asmat cultural ceremonies were officially discouraged, Bishop Alphonse Sowada was instrumental in facilitating the revitalization of woodcarving and other festivals, which remain strong today. The Catholic Church, along with Tobias Schneebaum and Ursula Konrad, established the Asmat Museum of Culture and Progress (AMCP) in the local town of Agats in 1973, to maintain local pride in Asmat cultural traditions. In 1981, Sowada founded an annual woodcarving competition and auction to recognize outstanding carvers held in early October in Agats. After his retirement and return to America, he founded the American Museum of Asmat Art, now in St. Paul, Minnesota, one of the largest collections of Asmat art in the United States.

=== Present day ===
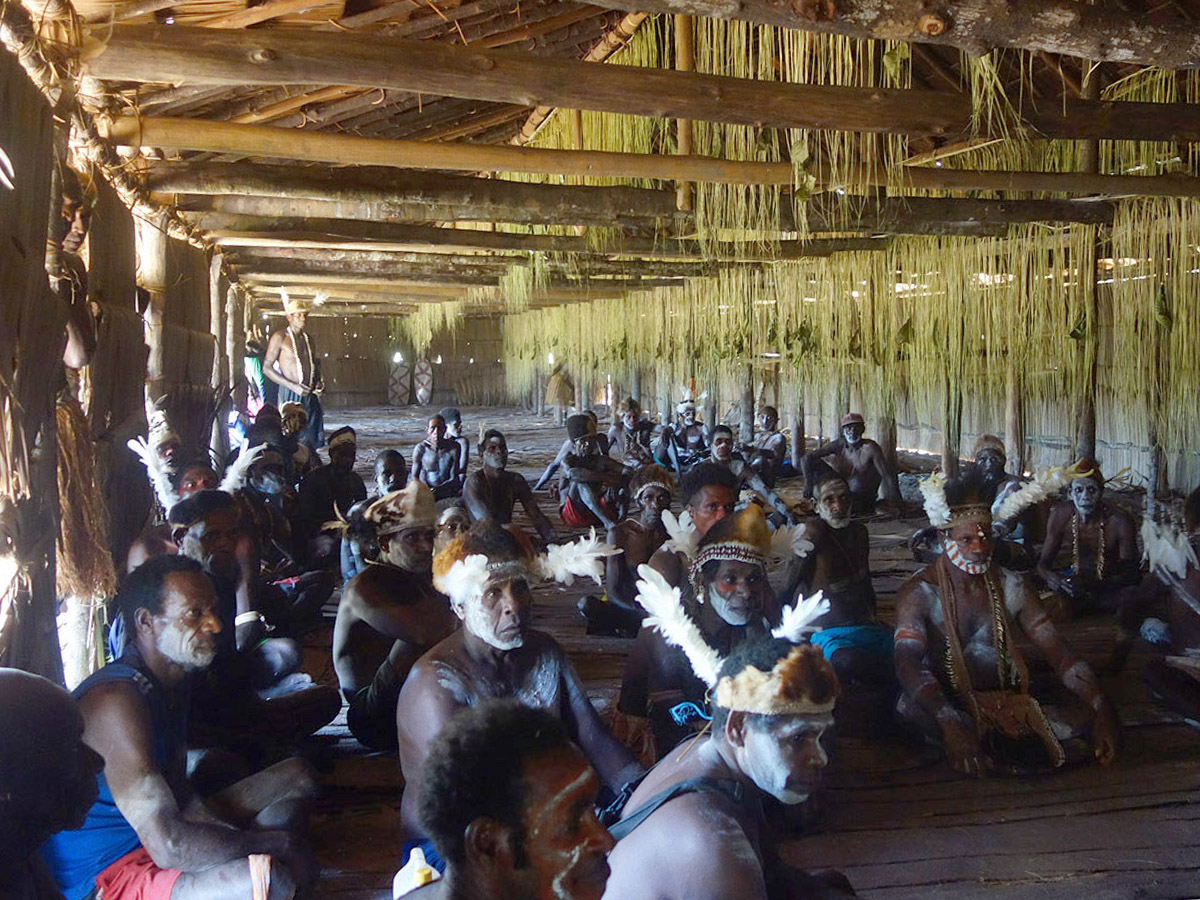
Asmat men inside their longhouse during a bisj pole completion ceremony, 2015

Even today, the Asmat are relatively isolated and their most important cultural traditions are still strong, though their interaction with the outside world has been increasing over the last decades. Many Asmat have received higher education in other parts of Indonesia and some in Europe. The Asmat seek to find ways to incorporate new technology and beneficial services such as health, communications, and education, while preserving their cultural traditions.

The biodiversity of their area has been under some pressure from outside logging and fishing, although this has faced significant and not unsuccessful resistance. In the year 2000, the Asmat formed Lembaga Musyawarah Adat Asmat (LMAA), a civil society organization that represents and articulates their interests and aspirations.

LMAA has been working with Indo-Pacific Conservation Alliance since 1999, and has established separate traditional sub-councils, or Forum Adat Rumpun (FAR) to implement joint activities. In 2004, the Asmat region became a separate governmental administrative unit or Kabupaten, and elected Mr. Yufen Biakai, former director of the AMCP and current Chairman of LMAA, as its Bupati (head of local government).

In 2022, following the formation of South Papua province which includes Asmat Regency, Apolo Safanpo, a native Asmat, was appointed as the first governor of South Papua.

== See also ==
- Indigenous people of New Guinea
