= Asmat Regency =

Regency in South Papua, Indonesia

Asmat Regency Kabupaten Asmat
- Regency
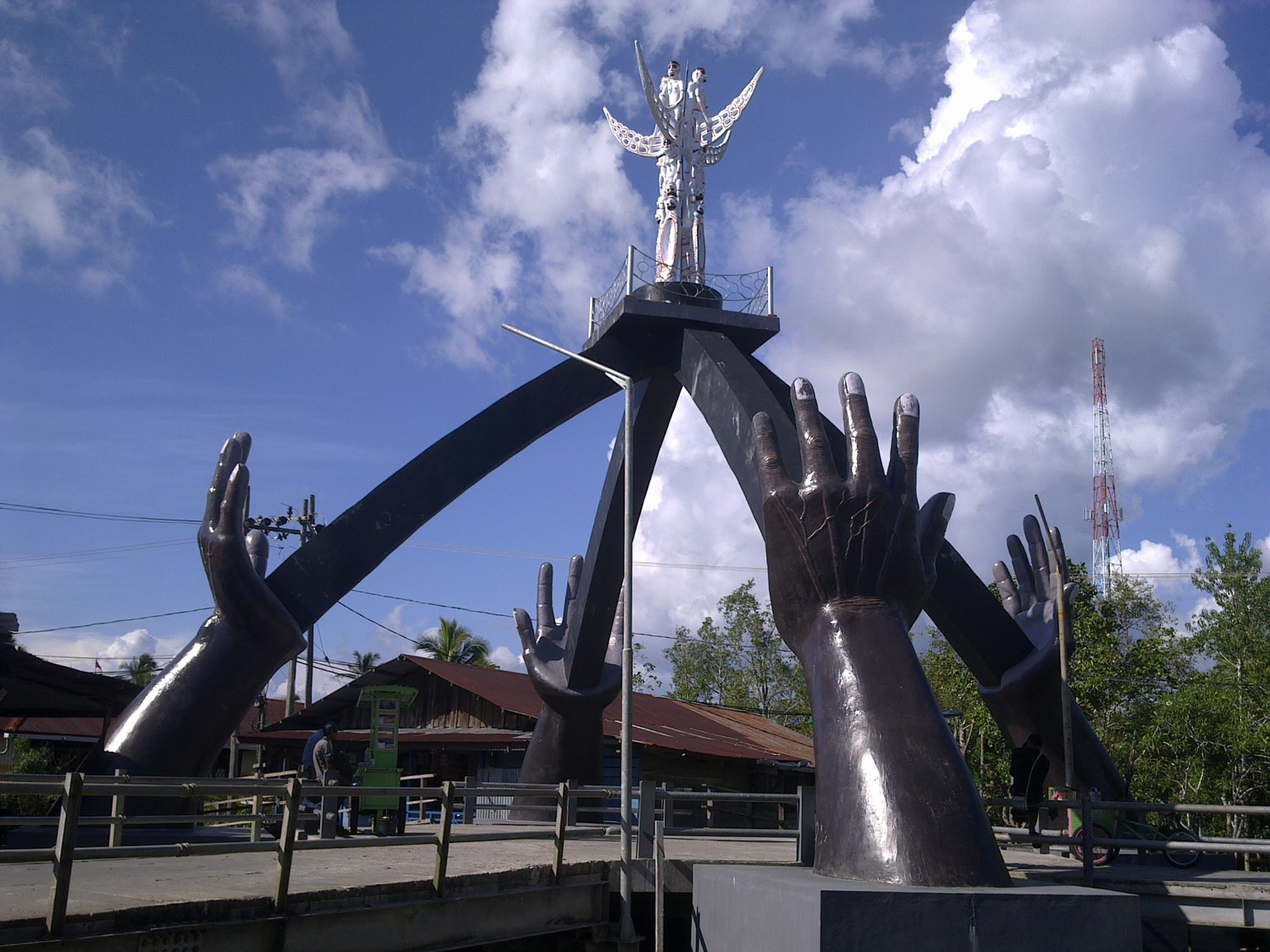
- Icon of Asmat Regency

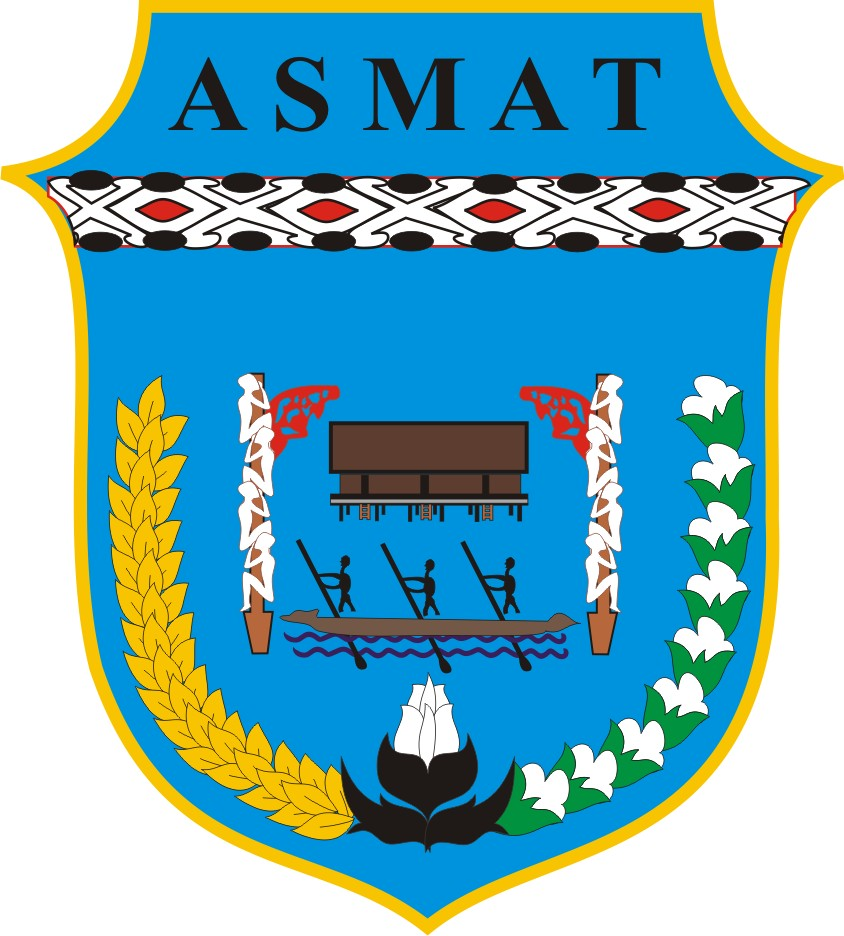
- Coat of arms
- Motto: Ja Asamanam Apcamar (Onward with Balance)

- Location in Western New Guinea and Indonesia Asmat Regency (Indonesia)
- Coordinates: 5.3795°S 138.4634°E
- Country: Indonesia
- Province: South Papua
- Regency seat: Agats

Government
  - Regent: Thomas E. Safanpo
  - Vice Regent: Yoel Manggaprou

Area
  - Total: 25,015.31 km^{2} (9,658.47 sq mi)

Population (mid 2024 estimate)
  - Total: 120,902
  - Density: 4.83312/km^{2} (12.5177/sq mi)

Demographics
  - Religion: Christianity 93.28% –Catholicism 56.44% –Protestantism 36.84% Islam 6.68% Hinduism 0.03% Buddhism 0.01%
  - Language: Indonesian (official); Asmat, Kamoro (native); Papuan Malay (lingua franca)
- Time zone: UTC+9 (Indonesia Eastern Time)
- Area code: (+62) 902
- Website: asmatkab.go.id

Asmat Regency is a regency (kabupaten) in the northwestern portion of the Indonesian province of South Papua. It is bounded to the southwest by the Arafura Sea, to the southeast and east by Mappi Regency, to the north by Highland Papua Province and to the northwest by Central Papua Province. It was split off from Merauke Regency (of which it had been a part) on 12 November 2002.

Asmat Regency covers a land area of 25,015.31 km^{2}, and had a population of 76,577 at the 2010 Census, 88,373 at the 2015 Intermediate Census, and 110,105 at the 2020 Census, while the official estimate as of mid-2024 was 120,902 (comprising 62,879 males and 58,023 females), mostly from the Asmat ethnic group. The administrative centre of the regency is the town of Agats.

== History ==
Asmat Regency is located in South Papua Province, Indonesia. The regency has a rich history and culture, much of which is influenced by the indigenous Asmat people.

=== Origin and name ===
The name Asmat is taken from the name of the ethnic group that inhabits the area. The Asmat people is known for their unique wood carving art and rich ceremonial traditions.

=== Before colonization ===
Before the arrival of the colonizers, the Asmat people lived in a traditional social structure that focused on customary and ritual systems. Dutch colonization began to influence the region in the late 19th century, although its influence was indirect and often intersected with local culture.

=== Dutch colonization ===
During the Dutch colonial period, Asmat, like many other areas in Papua, was the focus of exploration and missions. However, Dutch influence in Asmat was relatively limited compared to other areas in Papua.

=== Accession of Indonesia ===
Between Indonesia's independence in 1949 and 1962, the Asmat region was administered as a part of Dutch New Guinea along with the rest of the western half of the island of Papua. In 1962, the territory was handed over the United Nations Temporary Executive Authority, which itself gave the territory to Indonesia in 1963. Western New Guinea, including the territory that would later become Asmat Regency, officially joined Indonesia through the disputed Act of Free Choice in 1969.

=== Formation of the regency ===
Asmat Regency was formed in 1969 as part of an administrative effort to better manage and address the needs of the local community. The regency became part of Papua Province, and then, after expansion, became part of South Papua Province in 2022.

== Culture ==
Asmat Regency is renowned for its cultural diversity, including wood carving and traditional ceremonies, which are major attractions for researchers and tourists. Asmat history and culture remain an important part of the region's identity.

== Administrative districts ==
Asmat Regency in 2010 comprised eight districts (distrik), listed below with their areas and their populations at the 2010 Census.

Name of District (distrik)	Area in km^{2}	Pop'n 2010 Census
Pantai Kasuari	2,297	16,026
Fayit	968	7,025
Atsy	4,282	13,838
Suator	3,205	6,453
Akat	3,057	5,375
Agats	2,963	12,905
Sawa Erma	5,424	13,549
Suru-Suru	1,559	1,406

However, by 2012 the number of districts had increased to nineteen; the eleven additional districts created in 2011 and 2012 were Kopay, Der Koumur, Safan, Sirets, Ayip, Betcbamu, Kolf Braza, Jetsy, Unir Sirau, Joerat, and Pulau Tiga. In 2016 another four districts were created (Awyu, Aswi, Joutu and Koroway Buluanop), bringing the total to twenty-three districts, comprising 224 administrative villages. The districts are listed below with their areas and their populations at the 2020 Census, together with their official estimates as of mid-2024. The table also includes the locations of the district administrative centres, the number of administrative villages (kampung) in each district, and its post code. More recently another two districts have been created - Tomor Birip and Sor Ep - by further division of existing districts, bringing the total to 25 districts.

Kode Wilayah	Name of District (distrik)	Area in km^{2}	Pop'n 2020 Census	Pop'n mid 2024 Estimate	Admin centre	No. of villages	Post code
93.04.16	Safan	663.93	6,976	8,691	Primapun	12	99774
93.04.15	Kopay	737.23	3,725	4,216	Kawem	10	99772
93.04.06	Pantai Kasuari	301.94	5,103	5,450	Kamur	9	99773
93.04.14	Der Koumur	297.04	4,089	4,945	Yankap	6	99771
93.04.05	Fayit	450.30	5,611	6,937	Basim	13	99782
93.04.21	Aswi ^{(a)}	441.38	3,782	4,016	Piramat	10	99782
93.04.22	Awyu ^{(b)}	684.91	2,807	2,974	Wagi	6	99771: 99776
93.04.19	Bectbamu	700.48	2,816	3,409	You	7	99786
93.04.02	Atsy	1,360.80	7,065	7,374	Atsy	9	99775
93.04.18	Ayip	392.20	2,088	2,393	Comoro	6	99776
93.04.01	Agats	718.27	23,869	25,113	Bis Agats	12	99777
93.04.13	Jetsy	739.70	2,611	2,943	Warse	8	99785
93.04.17	Sirets	1,355.89	4,365	4,836	Yaosakor	8	99787
93.04.07	Suator	2,001.02	3,209	4,313	Binam	14	99792
93.04.20	Joutu ^{(c)}	557.43	2,149	2,461	Daikot	7	99792
93.04.11	Joerat	949.92	2,990	3,326	Yamas	6	99784
93.04.10	Unir Sirau	498.96	3,328	1,954	Komor	6	99780
93.04.04	Akat	95.58	5,603	2,852	Ayam	5	99779
93.04.25	Sor Ep	3,045.06	^{(d)}	2,629	Beco	6	99779
93.04.09	Kolf Braza	1,172.42	2,779	1,851	Binamsain	9	99791
93.04.23	Koroway Buluanop ^{(e)}	505.64	1,307	1,693	Mabul	8	99791 & 99792
93.04.12	Pulau Tiga	3,102.01	3,579	4,088	Nakai	11	99778
93.04.03	Sawa Erma ^{(f)}	2,456.44	6,084	6,496	Sawa	10	99783
93.04.24	Tomor Birip	1,620.65	^{(d)}	2,590	Tomor	8	99780 & 99781
93.04.08	Suru-Suru	166.11	4,171	3,352	Suru-suru	18	99781
	Totals	25,015.31	110,105	120,902	Agats	224	

Notes: (a) created in 2016 from part of Fayit District. (b) created in 2016 from parts of Ayip and other Districts.
(c) created in 2016 from part of Suator District. (d) included in the 2020 populations of the districts from which they were recently cut out.
(e) created in 2016 from parts of Kolf Braza and Suator Districts. (f) includes 4 offshore islands.

=== Villages ===
- Atsy
- Bis Agats
- Omandesep
- Otsjanep

== See also ==
- Asmat people
- Lorentz National Park
