= List of unclassified languages according to the Ethnologue =

The following languages are listed as unclassified by the Ethnologue (17th edition), though in their descriptions some are identified with an established family, or have been retired as spurious. Since the 15th edition, several other unclassified languages were found to be related to known languages once better data was collected, and some, such as Amikoana and Miarrã, were found to be spurious and their ISO codes were retired.

There are 48 unclassified languages in the 25th edition of Ethnologue published in 2022.

== Africa ==
- Bung language (Cameroon)
- Gail language (a cant of South Africa)
- ~~Imeraguen language (Mauritania, Hassaniya-Soninke mix?)~~ (retired)
- Kara language (Central African Republic, Central Sudanic)
- Kujarge language (Chad, Afroasiatic?)
- Leti language (Cameroon)
- Lufu language (Nigeria, Southern Jukunoid?)
- Cameroonian Luo language (Cameroon; not to be confused with the better-known Luo language)
- Nigerian Mawa language (Nigeria; not to be confused with the Chadian Mawa language)
- Rer Bare language (Ethiopia, unattested)
- Shabo language (Ethiopia)
- Weyto language (Ethiopia, unattested)
- ~~Yeni language~~ (Cameroon, Mambiloid)

== Americas ==
=== North ===
- Haitian Vodoun Culture language (Haiti)
- ~~Mangue language (Nicaragua)~~ (Oto-Manguean)

== Asia ==
- ~~Bhatola language [btl]~~ (ISO code retired due to being spurious). Bhatola is listed as unclassifiable (due to a lack of data) by Glottolog.
- ~~Enggano language (Indonesia)~~ (Austronesian)
- Majhwar language (India, possible dialect of Asuri [Mundari])
- ~~Malakhel language (Afghanistan)~~ (code retired)
- ~~Ná-Meo language~~ (Vietnam, possibly from Guangxi) (ethnically Hmong, said to be East Hmongic)
- ~~Warduji language [wrd]~~ (Sanglechi) (code retired)
- Waxiang (China, mixed Xiang-Hmongic?)
- ~~Kambojan language~~ (Afghanistan(?), Tajikistan(?) and India(?), Nuristani?, Iranian?, Indo-Aryan?, mixed Nuristani-Iranian?

== Europe ==
All cants:

- Polari (United Kingdom)
- Quinqui (Spain)
- Traveller Scottish (United Kingdom)

== Oceania ==
- Doso language (Papua New Guinea)
- Kembra language (Irian Jaya, Indonesia)
- Kimki language (Irian Jaya)
- Lepki language (Irian Jaya)
- Molof language (Irian Jaya)
- Murkim language (Irian Jaya)
- Namla language (Irian Jaya)
- Tofanma language (Irian Jaya)
- Usku language (Irian Jaya)
- Yetfa language (Irian Jaya)
- ~~Yitha Yitha language~~ (Australia) (Ethnologue has a Ngarinyeric-Yithayithic branch of Pama-Nyungan that Yitha Yitha is traditionally classified in)
