= Languages of Indonesia =

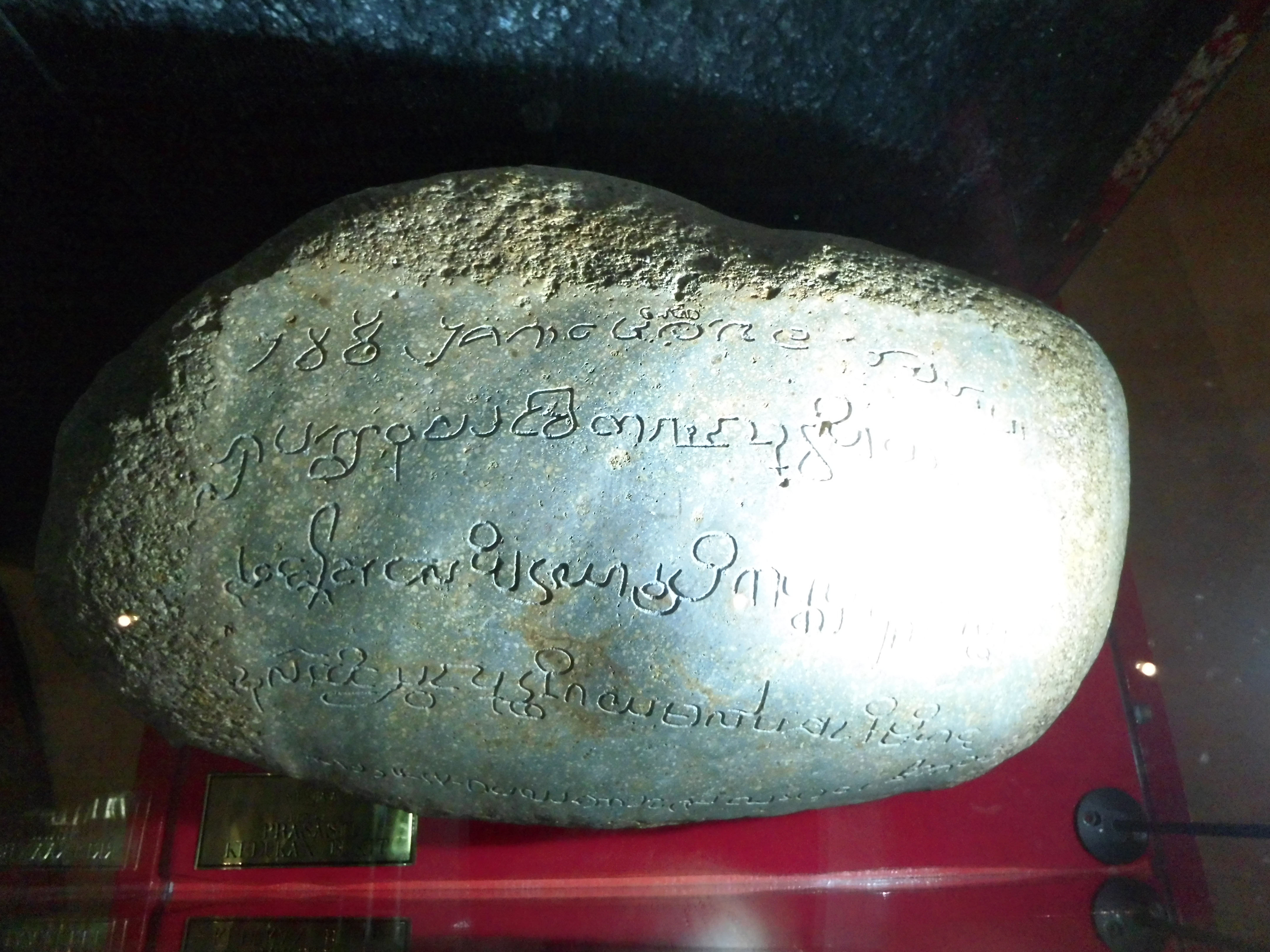
- The Kedukan Bukit inscription (7th century CE), found in South Sumatra, is the oldest surviving specimen of the Old Malay language, which later evolved into various varieties across the archipelago, one of which was standardized into modern Indonesian. Map of the distribution of traditional scripts in Indonesia.
- Official: Indonesian
- Main: Indonesian; Javanese; Sundanese; Malay; Madurese; Minangkabau; Banjarese; Buginese; Balinese; Batak (Toba, Karo, Mandailing, Simalungun, Angkola, Dairi); Cirebonese
- Regional: Acehnese; Alor languages (Abui, Adang, Klon, Kui, Kamang, Sawila, Teiwa); Ambonese; Aru languages (Dobel, Mariri, Barakai, Batuley, Kola, Manombai, dll.); Bahau; Bajau; Balinese Malay; Banda Malay; Banggai; Betawi; Bima; Buru; Butonese languages; Dayak languages (Ngaju, Ma'anyan, Kendayan, etc.); Gayo; Gorap; Gorontalic languages (Gorontalo, Bololango, Buol, Kaidipang, Lolak, Suwawa); Helong; Halmahera languages (Tobelo, Ternate, Tidore, Galela, Loloda); Iban; Kaili; Kambera; Kei; Kerinci; Komering; Kupang Malay; Lampung; Lamaholot; Makassarese; Makassar Malay; Malayic languages (Jambi Malay, Palembang Malay, Kutai Malay, Pontianak Malay, Riau Malay, Sambas Malay); Manggarai; Manado Malay; Mentawai; Minahasan languages (Tombulu, Tondano, Tonsea, Tonsawang, Tontemboan); Mongondowic languages (Mongondow, Ponosakan); Muna; Nagi; Nias; North Moluccan Malay; Orang Pulo; Papuan Malay; Papuan languages (Biak, Asmat, Tobati, Dani, Mee, Sentani, etc.); Rejang; Rote; Sabah Malay; Sangiric languages (Sangir, Talaud, Bantik, Ratahan); Sasak; Savu; Serui; Sumbawa; Tae'; Tanimbar languages; Tausūg (Suluk); Tetum; Tidong; Tolaki; Toraja-Sa'dan; Uab Meto
- Vernacular: Colloquial Indonesian (Bahasa Gaul)
- Foreign: English; Arabic; Chinese languages; Dutch; Japanese
- Signed: Indonesian Sign Language
- Keyboard layout: QWERTY

Indonesia is home to over 700 living languages spoken across its extensive archipelago. This significant linguistic variety constitutes approximately 10% of the world’s total languages, positioning Indonesia as the second most linguistically diverse nation globally, following Papua New Guinea. The majority of these languages belong to the Austronesian language family, prevalent in the western and central regions of Indonesia, including languages such as Acehnese, Sundanese, and Buginese. In contrast, the eastern regions, particularly Papua and the Maluku Islands, are home to more than 150 Papuan languages, which are distinct from the Austronesian family and represent a unique linguistic heritage. The language most widely spoken as a native language is Javanese, primarily by the Javanese people in the central and eastern parts of Java Island, as well as across many other islands due to migration.

Languages in Indonesia are classified into nine categories: national language, locally used indigenous languages, regional lingua francas, foreign and additional languages, heritage languages, languages in the religious domain, English as a lingua franca, and sign languages.

== National language ==
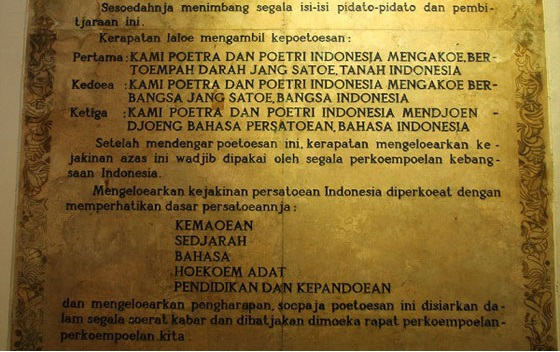
The Youth Pledge, a pledge made by Indonesian youths on October 28, 1928, defining the identity of the Indonesian nation. On the last pledge, there was an affirmation of Indonesian language as a unifying language throughout the archipelago.

The official language of Indonesia is Indonesian (locally known as bahasa Indonesia), a standardised form of Malay, which serves as the lingua franca of the archipelago. According to the 2020 census, over 97% of Indonesians are fluent in Indonesian. The vocabulary of Indonesian borrows heavily from regional languages of Indonesia, such as Javanese, Sundanese and Minangkabau, as well as from Dutch, Sanskrit, Portuguese, Arabic and more recently English. The Indonesian language is primarily used in commerce, administration, education and the media; thus, nearly every Indonesian speaks the language to varying degrees of proficiency. Most Indonesians speak other languages, such as Javanese, as their first language. This makes plurilingualism a norm in Indonesia.

== Indigenous languages and regional lingua francas ==
The major ethno-linguistic groups within Indonesia

Indonesia recognizes only a single national language, and indigenous languages are recognized at the regional level, although policies may vary from one region to another. For example, in the Special Region of Yogyakarta, the Javanese language has the status of a regional official language in Yogyakarta under regional law, where it is used for cultural, educational, and communicative purposes, while Indonesian remains the sole national language of administration Javanese is the most spoken indigenous language, with native speakers constituting 31.8% of the total population of Indonesia (as of 2010). Javanese speakers are predominantly located in the central to eastern parts of Java, and there are also sizable numbers in most provinces. The next most widely spoken regional languages in the country are Sundanese, local Malay, Madurese, and Minangkabau. A sense of Indonesian nationhood exists alongside strong regional identities.

There are hundreds of indigenous languages spoken in Indonesia. Most of them are locally used indigenous languages, a category of languages referring to those spoken at the local, regional level, spoken by a small number of people, ranging from a few to a few thousands of people. These include small languages such as Benggoi, Mombum, and Towei. Other languages are spoken at the regional level to connect various ethnicities. For this reason, these languages are known as regional lingua francas (RLFs). According to Subhan Zein, there are at least 43 RLFs in Indonesia, categorized into two types: Malayic RLFs and Non-Malayic RLFs. The former refers to a group of regional lingua francas that are thought of as indigenised varieties of Malay or Indonesian. These include such languages as Ambonese Malay, Banjarese, Manado Malay, and Papuan Malay. The latter refers to regional lingua francas that are not associated with Malay or Indonesian, including Biak, Iban, and Onin. (Note: Zein's definition of "Malayic" RLFs should not be confused with the genealogical Malayic subgroup of Malayo-Polynesian languages. The genealogical Malayic subgroup also includes languages that are listed by Zein as "non-Malayic" RLFs, such as Iban and Musi.)

== Foreign languages ==
As early as the seventh century AD, the natives of the archipelago began an intense period of trade with people from China, India and other countries. This was followed by a long period of colonization by the Dutch and Portuguese colonials. The outcome of these processes has been the development of a group of heritage languages spoken by Arab, Chinese, Eurasian and Dutch descendants, among others. Chinese linguistic varieties such as Hokkien, Hakka, and Mandarin are the most common heritage languages. Tamil is also spoken among majority of Indians in the country. A small number of heritage language speakers speak Arabic and Dutch.

=== Dutch ===
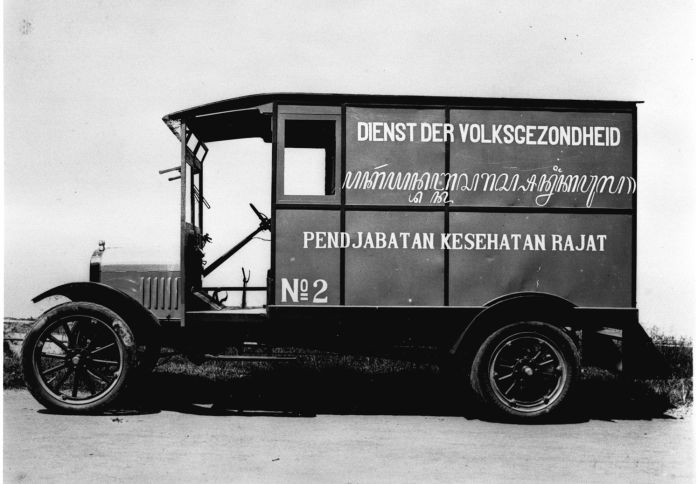
The use of Dutch, Javanese and Malay in Java, Dutch East Indies

Despite the Dutch presence in Indonesia for almost 350 years (parts of Indonesia were ruled by the Dutch East India Company and the whole of modern Indonesia was in the Dutch East Indies) the Dutch language has no official status in Indonesia. The small minority that can speak the language fluently are either educated members of the oldest generation, or employed in the legal profession, as certain law codes are still available only in Dutch.

=== English ===
English has historically been categorized as the first foreign language in Indonesia. However, increasing exposure to English, the decreasing influence of native-speaker norms in the country and the prevalent use of English as a lingua franca in the broader context such as ASEAN means that the categorization has been put into question. Scholars such as Lowenberg argue that English is best seen as an additional language. Meanwhile, Zein argues that English in Indonesia is best categorized as a lingua franca, an argument parallel with Kirkpatrick's contention on the use of English as a lingua franca in the broader ASEAN context.

=== Other languages ===
Other languages, such as Arabic, Chinese, French, German, Japanese, Korean, Russian, Portuguese and Spanish, are non-native to Indonesia. These languages are included in the educational curriculum and may be categorized as either foreign or additional languages, depending on the instrumental function of the languages, length and types of exposure, as well as the wide-ranging motivations of the speakers or learners who use and or learn them.

== Endangered languages ==
There are 726 languages spoken across the Indonesian archipelago in 2009 (dropped from 742 languages in 2007), the second largest multilingual population in the world after Papua New Guinea. Indonesian Papua, which is adjacent to Papua New Guinea, has the most languages in Indonesia. Based on the Expanded Graded Intergenerational Disruption Scale classification used by Ethnologue (formerly the Summer Institute of Linguistics), 63 languages are dying (shown in red on the bar chart, subdivided into Moribund and Nearly Extinct, or Dormant), which is defined as "The only fluent users (if any) are older than child-bearing age."

== Language policy ==
Indonesia's national language policy is governed by various legal frameworks. Article 36C of the 1945 Constitution mandates that matters related to the national flag, language, emblem, and anthem must be regulated by law. This mandate led to the enactment of Law No. 24 of 2009 on the National Flag, Language, Emblem, and Anthem, which dedicates Chapter III (Articles 25–45) to the regulation of the Indonesian language.

In addition to regulating the national language, the government has implemented a Regional Language Revitalization Program (Revitalisasi Bahasa Daerah (RBD)), which aims to preserve and promote local languages by ensuring their transmission to younger generations. To support this initiative, the ministry has published Guidelines for Regional Language Revitalization (Pedoman Model Revitalisasi Bahasa Daerah), providing a structured approach for implementation across different regions.

Indonesia is home to 718 regional languages, many of which are classified as endangered or critically endangered. The revitalization efforts are part of a broader strategy to maintain linguistic diversity while reinforcing the role of Indonesian as the national language.

== Languages by speakers ==
The population numbers given below are of native speakers, excepting the figure for Indonesian, which counts its total speakers. The total population of the country was 237.6 million in 2010.

Largest languages in Indonesia
| Language | Number | % of total population | Branch | Year surveyed | Main areas where spoken |
|---|---|---|---|---|---|
| Indonesian | 210,000,000 | 80.42% | Malayic | 2010 | Throughout Indonesia |
| Javanese | 84,300,000 | 32.28% | Javanese | 2000 (census) | Throughout Java Island and several provinces in Sumatra and Kalimantan islands. |
| Sundanese | 42,000,000 | 16.08% | Sundanese | 2016 | West Java, Banten, Jakarta |
| Madurese | 13,600,000 | 5.21% | Madurese | 2000 (census) | Madura Island (East Java) |
| Minangkabau | 5,500,000 | 2.11% | Malayic | 2007 | West Sumatra, Riau, Jambi, Bengkulu, Jakarta |
| Buginese | 5,000,000 | 1.91% | South Sulawesi | 2000 (census) | South Sulawesi |
| Palembang Malay | 3,900,000 | 1.49% | Malayic | 2000 (census) | South Sumatra |
| Banjarese | 3,500,000 | 1.34% | Malayic | 2000 (census) | South Kalimantan, East Kalimantan, Central Kalimantan |
| Acehnese | 3,500,000 | 1.34% | Chamic | 2000 (census) | Aceh |
| Balinese | 3,300,000 | 1.26% | Bali-Sasak-Sumbawa | 2000 (census) | Bali Island and Lombok Island |
| Betawi | 2,700,000 | 1.03% | Malay-based creole | 1993 | Jakarta |
| Sasak | 2,100,000 | 0.8% | Bali-Sasak-Sumbawa | 1989 | Lombok Island (West Nusa Tenggara) |
| Batak Toba | 2,000,000 | 0.77% | Northwest Sumatra–Barrier Islands | 1991 | North Sumatra, Riau, Riau Islands |
| Ambonese Malay | 1,900,000 | 0.73% | Malay-based creole | 1987 | Maluku |
| Makassarese | 2,100,000 | 0.80% | South Sulawesi | 2000 (census) | South Sulawesi |
| Min Nan | 1,300,000 | 0.50% | Sinitic | 2000 | North Sumatra, Riau, Riau Islands, West Kalimantan |
| Batak Dairi | 1,200,000 | 0.46% | Northwest Sumatra–Barrier Islands | 1991 | North Sumatra |
| Batak Simalungun | 1,200,000 | 0.46% | Northwest Sumatra–Barrier Islands | 2000 (census) | North Sumatra |
| Batak Mandailing | 1,100,000 | 0.42% | Northwest Sumatra–Barrier Islands | 2000 (census) | North Sumatra |
| Jambi Malay | 1,000,000 | 0.38% | Malayic | 2000 (census) | Jambi |
| Gorontalo | 1,000,000 | 0.38% | Philippine | 2000 (census) | Gorontalo |
| Ngaju Dayak | 900,000 | 0.34% | West Barito | 2003 | Central Kalimantan |
| Nias | 800,000 | 0.31% | Northwest Sumatra–Barrier Islands | 2000 (census) | Nias Island, North Sumatra |
| Batak Angkola | 700,000 | 0.27% | Northwest Sumatra–Barrier Islands | 1991 | North Sumatra |
| Manado Malay | 800,000 | 0.31% | Malay-based creole | 2001 | North Sulawesi |
| North Moluccan Malay | 700,000 | 0.27% | Malay-based creole | 2001 | North Maluku |
| Hakka | 600,000 | 0.23% | Sinitic | 1982 | Bangka Belitung, Riau Islands and West Kalimantan |
| Batak Karo | 600,000 | 0.23% | Northwest Sumatra–Barrier Islands | 1991 | North Sumatra |
| Uab Meto | 600,000 | 0.23% | Timor-Babar | 1997 | West Timor (East Nusa Tenggara) |
| Bima | 500,000 | 0.19% | Bima | 1989 | Sumbawa Island (West Nusa Tenggara) |
| Manggarai | 500,000 | 0.19% | Sumba-Flores | 1989 | Flores Island (East Nusa Tenggara) |
| Toraja-Sa’dan | 500,000 | 0.19% | South Sulawesi | 1990 | South Sulawesi, West Sulawesi |
| Komering | 500,000 | 0.19% | Lampungic | 2000 (census) | South Sumatra |
| Tetum | 400,000 | 0.15% | Timor-Babar | 2004 | West Timor (East Nusa Tenggara) |
| Rejang | 400,000 | 0.15% | Land Dayak | 2000 (census) | Bengkulu |
| Muna | 300,000 | 0.11% | Muna–Buton | 1989 | Southeast Sulawesi |
| Sumbawa | 300,000 | 0.11% | Bali-Sasak-Sumbawa | 1989 | Sumbawa Island (West Nusa Tenggara) |
| Bangka Malay | 300,000 | 0.11% | Malayic | 2000 (census) | Bangka Island (Bangka Belitung) |
| Osing | 300,000 | 0.11% | Javanese | 2000 (census) | East Java |
| Gayo | 300,000 | 0.11% | Northwest Sumatra–Barrier Islands | 2000 (census) | Aceh |
| Cantonese | 300,000 | 0.11% | Sinitic (Yue) | 2000 | North Sumatra, Riau Islands, Jakarta |
| Tolaki | 300,000 | 0.11% | Celebic | 1991 | Southeast Sulawesi |
| Taeʼ | 300,000 | 0.11% | South Sulawesi | 1992 | South Sulawesi |

== Languages by family ==
Several prominent languages spoken in Indonesia sorted by language family are:

- Austronesian languages – (Malayo-Polynesian branch). Most languages spoken in Indonesia belong to this family, which in return are related to languages spoken in Madagascar, Malaysia, Philippines, New Zealand, Hawaii and various Oceanian countries.
  - Javanese language, spoken in Yogyakarta, Central Java and East Java. Speakers are also found in Lampung since Javanese migrants make up more than half of the province's population. Also found throughout Indonesia and by migrants in Suriname. Most populous Austronesian language by number of first language speakers.
  - Lampung language, two distinct but closely related languages spoken in Lampung, South Sumatra and Banten.
    - Komering, spoken in South Sumatra province.
  - Rejang language, spoken in Bengkulu province.
  - Malayo-Sumbawan languages:
    - Malay language, spoken throughout Indonesia. Also used as the national language (officially regulated and designated as Indonesian). Officially recognized in Malaysia (as Malaysian Malay), Singapore, and Brunei.
    - Acehnese language, spoken in Aceh, especially coastal part of Sumatra island.
    - Minangkabau language, spoken in West Sumatra.
    - Banjar language, spoken in South, East, and Central Kalimantan.
    - Sundanese language, spoken in West Java, Banten and Jakarta.
    - Balinese language, spoken in Bali.
    - Madurese language, spoken in Madura, Bawean and surrounding islands off the coast of Java.
    - Sasak language, spoken in Lombok, West Nusa Tenggara.
  - Barito languages:
    - Ma'anyan language, closely related to the Malagasy language spoken in Madagascar.
  - Northwest Sumatra–Barrier Islands languages:
    - Batak languages, seven closely related languages spoken by the Batak people in the highlands of North Sumatra.
    - Nias language, in Nias island off the western coast of North Sumatra.
    - Simeulue language, in Simeulue island off the western coast of Aceh.
    - Gayo language, in Gayo highlands in central Aceh.
  - South Sulawesi languages:
    - Bugis language, spoken by Bugis in central South Sulawesi and neighbouring provinces.
    - Makassarese language, spoken by Makassarese in southern end of South Sulawesi.
    - Toraja language, spoken by Toraja people in northern highland of South Sulawesi.
    - Mandar language, spoken in West Sulawesi.
  - Philippine languages:
    - Gorontalo language, spoken in Gorontalo province.
    - Mongondow language, spoken in western part of North Sulawesi.
    - Minahasan languages, spoken in eastern part of North Sulawesi.
    - Suluk or Tausug language, spoken in northeastern part, of North Kalimantan.
    - Sangiric languages, spoken in northern islands part of North Sulawesi.
  - Oceanic languages
    - Sarmi-Jayapura languages, spoken in the northern part of Papua.
  - Enggano language of Sumatra, unclassified
- West Papuan languages, an indigenous language family found only in eastern Indonesia (northern Maluku and western Papua). No discernible relationship with other language families. Distinct from surrounding Austronesian languages.
  - Ternate language, spoken in Ternate and northern Halmahera.
  - Tidore language, spoken in Tidore and western Halmahera, closely related to the above Ternate language.
- Trans–New Guinea languages, an indigenous language family found in eastern Indonesia (New Guinea, Alor, Timor islands). Consisting of hundreds of languages, including the vernaculars of the Asmat and Dani people.
- Mairasi languages (4)
- East Cenderawasih (Geelvink Bay) languages (10)
- Lakes Plain languages (19; upper Mamberamo River)
- Tor–Kwerba languages (17)
- Nimboran languages (5)
- Skou languages (Skou)
- Border languages (15)
- Senagi languages (2)
- Pauwasi languages

There are many additional small families and isolates among the Papuan languages.

Below is a full list of Papuan language families spoken in Indonesia, following Palmer, et al. (2018):

1. Trans-New Guinea
  1. Ok-Oksapmin (also in Papua New Guinea)
  2. Dani
  3. Asmat-Kamoro
  4. Mek
  5. Paniai Lakes
  6. West Bomberai
  7. Somahai
  8. Anim (also in Papua New Guinea)
  9. Greater Awyu
  10. Kayagaric
  11. Kolopom
  12. Morori
2. Timor-Alor-Pantar
3. North Halmahera
4. Tambora†
5. Nuclear South Bird's Head
6. Inanwatan–Duriankere
7. Konda–Yahadian
8. Nuclear East Bird's Head
9. Hatam–Mansim
10. West Bird's Head
11. Abun
12. Mpur
13. Maybrat
14. Mor
15. Tanah Merah
16. Tor-Kwerba
17. Lakes Plain
18. Border (also in Papua New Guinea)
19. Sko (also in Papua New Guinea)
20. East Cenderawasih Bay
21. Yam (also in Papua New Guinea)
22. Komolom
23. Yelmek-Maklew
24. Eastern Pauwasi (also in Papua New Guinea)
25. Western Pauwasi
26. Nimboran
27. Sentani
28. Mairasi
29. Kaure
30. Lepki-Murkim
31. Senagi (Angor-Dera) (also in Papua New Guinea)
32. Tofanma-Namla
33. Yapen
34. Abinomn
35. Burmeso
36. Elseng
37. Kapauri
38. Kembra
39. Keuw
40. Kimki
41. Massep
42. Mawes
43. Molof
44. Usku
45. Yetfa
46. Bayono-Awbono
47. Dem
48. Uhunduni

== Sign languages ==
There are at least 2.5 million sign language users across the country, although official report only shows less than 50,000. Sign language users are often ridiculed and stigmatized.

- Indonesian Sign Language
  - Yogyakarta Sign Language
  - Jakarta Sign Language
- Kata Kolok

== Writing system ==
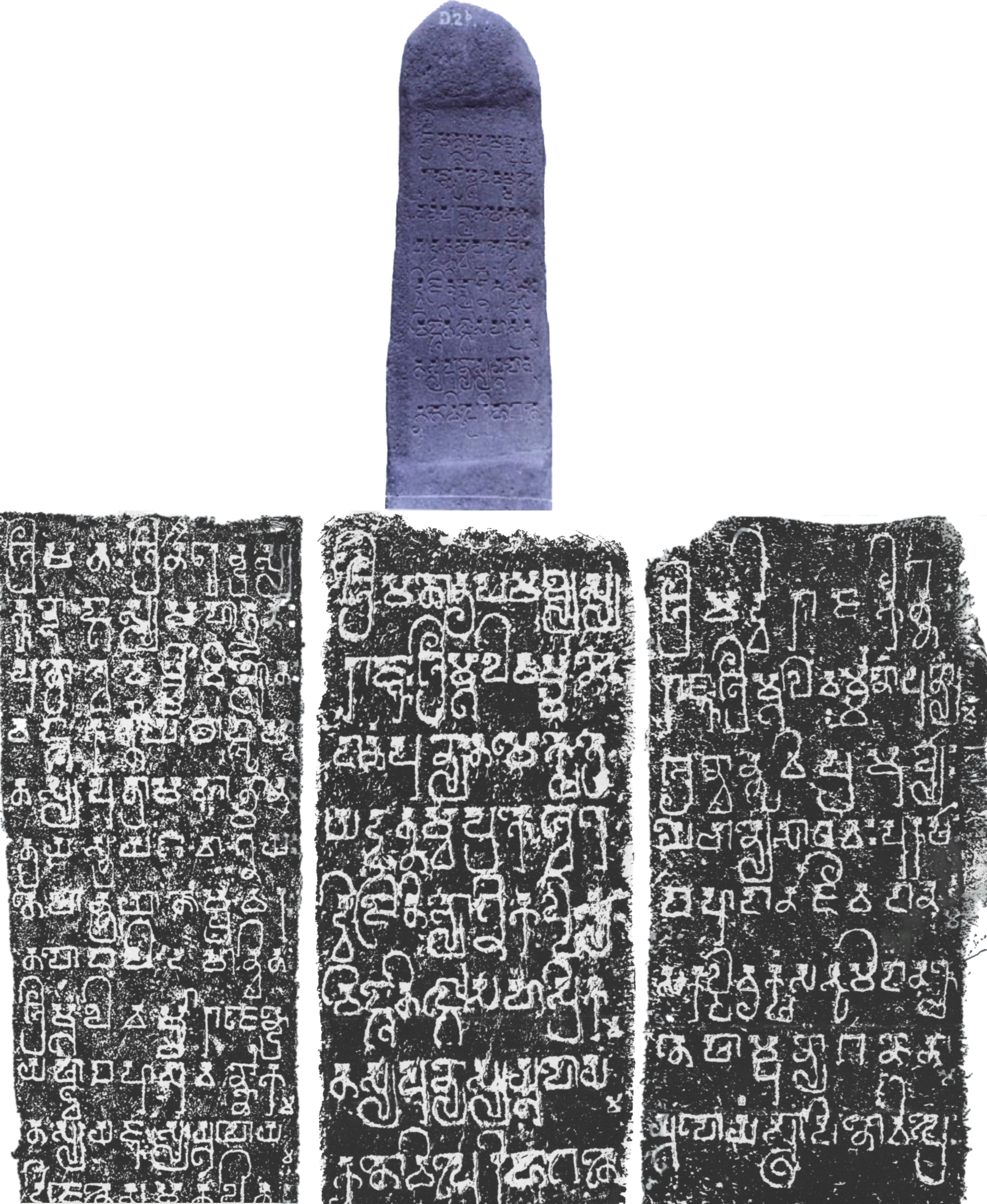
One of the Yupa inscriptions from Kutai, East Kalimantan, written in Sanskrit using the Tamil Grantha script.

Indonesian languages are generally not rendered in native-invented systems, but in scripts devised by speakers of other languages, that is, Tamil, Arabic, and Latin. Malay, for example, has a long history as a written language and has been rendered in Brahmic, Arabic, and Latin scripts. Javanese has been written in the Pallava script of South India, as well as their derivative (known as Kawi and Javanese), in an Arabic alphabet called pegon that incorporates Javanese sounds, and in the Latin script.

Chinese characters have never been used to write Indonesian languages, although Indonesian place-names, personal names, and names of trade goods appear in reports and histories written for China's imperial courts.

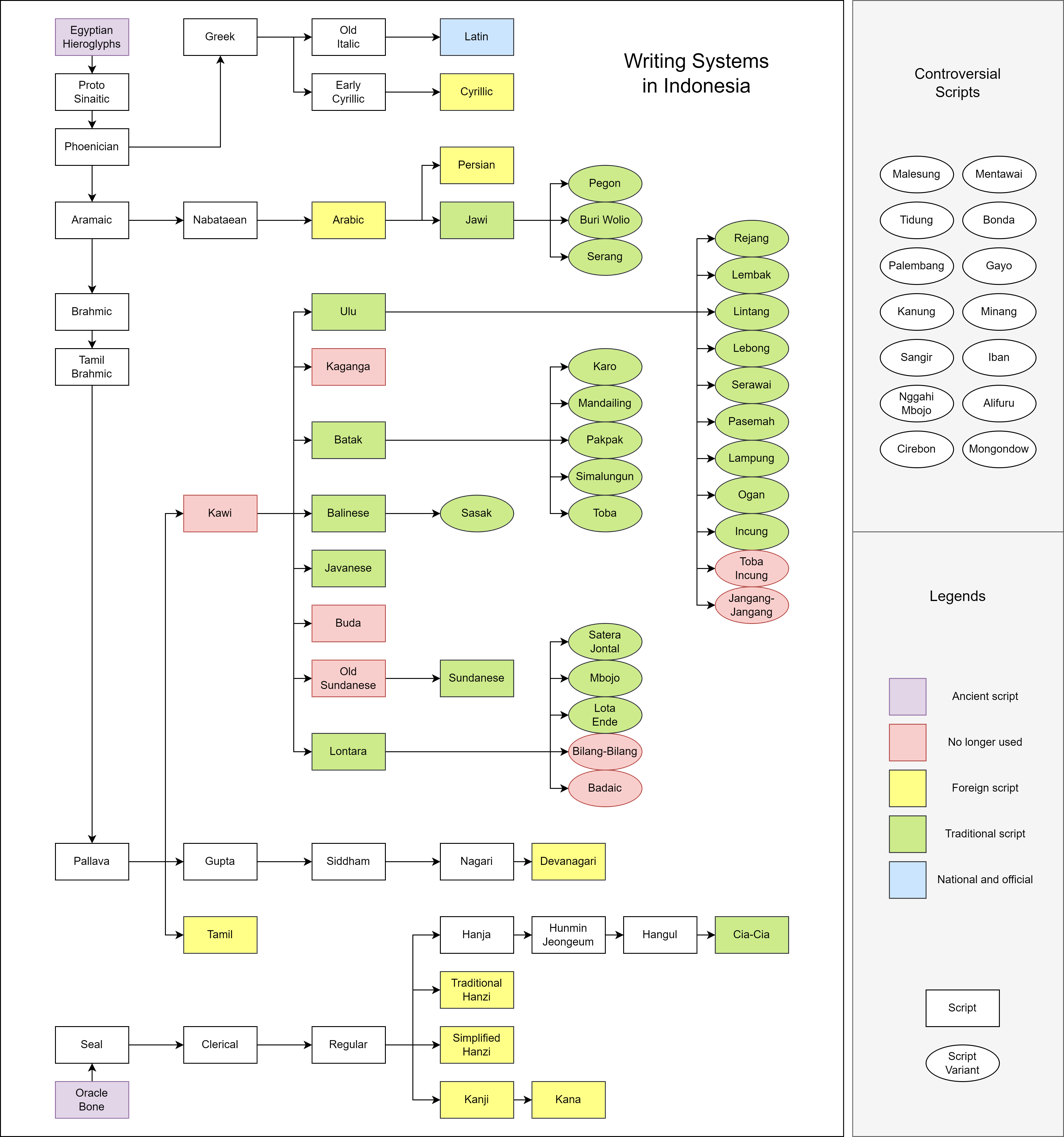
Tree diagram of various writing systems that are used in Indonesia

=== List of writing systems ===
- Latin – The national and official writing system of Indonesia. Indonesian, along with all of the country’s vernacular languages, adopts Latin script. It is used in every branch of government and widely across all aspects of life in Indonesia, including education, entertainment, media, and more. Latin script ensures uniformity in communication across Indonesia’s many ethnic groups and languages.
- Traditional writing systems – Traditional writing systems or Nusantara scripts are used for cultural preservation. Nusantara scripts are taught in schools in some regions as a "Muatan Lokal" or local curriculum. Some local governments, like, Aceh, Yogyakarta, Bali, and others, promote their use in signage and education. Currently, Nusantara scripts that still in use are:
  1. Balinese – A Brahmic-based script, used to write Balinese and Sasak. It is closely related to Javanese script. Balinese script is taught in some schools in Bali and Lombok. Variants of Balinese script are:
    - Balinese script
    - Sasak script
  2. Javanese – A Brahmic-based script, used mainly to write Javanese and sometimes for Madurese, Sundanese, Cirebonese, and Osing. Javanese script is taught in some schools in Yogyakarta, East, and Central Java.
  3. Sundanese – A Brahmic-based script, used by Sundanese to write the Sundanese language. Sundanese script is taught in some schools in Banten and West Java.
  4. Batak – A Brahmic-based script, used by the Batak people to write Batak languages. Batak script is taught in some schools in North Sumatra. Variants of Batak scripts are:
    - Batak Karo script
    - Batak Mandailing script
    - Batak Pakpak script
    - Batak Simalungun script
    - Batak Toba script
  5. Ulu – A Brahmic-based script, used by southern Sumatran people to write Lampung, Bengkulu, Ogan, Rejang, Malay, Serawai, Kerinci, and other Malayic languages. Ulu script is taught in some schools in Jambi, Bengkulu, South Sumatra, and Lampung. Variants of Ulu scripts are:
    - Ulu/Rencong script
    - Rejang script (used by the Rejang people of Bengkulu)
    - Incung script (used by the Kerinci people to write their language)
    - Ogan script (used by the Ogan people people to write their language)
    - Lampung script (used to write Lampung and Komering)
    - Lembak script
    - Lintang script
    - Lebong script
    - Serawai script
    - Pasemah script
  6. Lontara – A Brahmic-based script, used in southern Sulawesi mainly to write Buginese and Makassarese, and sometimes for Mandar and Luwu. Lontara is also used to write Sumbawa, Bima, and Ende languages. Lontara script is taught in some schools in Sumbawa, Flores, West, and South Sulawesi. Variants of Lontara scripts are:
    - Lontara script
    - Satera Jontal script (used to write Sumbawa)
    - Mbojo script (used to write Bima)
    - Lota Ende script (used to write Ende)
  7. Jawi – An Arabic-based script, once widely used throughout Indonesia, now in decline but still used by Malays, Betawi, Minangkabau, Banjarese, Acehnese, Javanese, Osing, Sundanese, and Madurese. Jawi script is taught in some schools in various regions, particularly in Aceh, West Sumatra, South Kalimantan, Madura, etc. Variants of Jawi scripts are:
    - Jawi script
    - Pegon script (used mainly to write Madurese, sometimes also for Sundanese, Javanese, and Osing languages)
    - Buri Wolio script (used to write Wolio)
    - Serang script (used to write Buginese and Makassarese)
  8. Cia-Cia script – A Hangul-based script, used to write Cia-Cia. Cia-Cia is taught in some schools in Buton.
- Foreign writing systems – Various foreign scripts that mainly used by the descendants of the respective ethnicities or by foreigners residing in Indonesia. These foreign scripts are not managed by the government of Indonesia; thus, the regulations, rules, syntax, grammar, etc., follow the writing systems of their countries of origin. Several foreign scripts in Indonesia are:
  1. Hanzi (used to write Cantonese, Hakka, Hokkien, Mandarin, and Japanese)
  2. Kana (used to write Japanese)
  3. Arabic (used to write Arabic and Persian)
  4. Devanagari (used to write Hindi and Sanskrit)
  5. Tamil (used to write Tamil)
  6. Cyrillic (used to write Russian and Ukrainian)
- Other writing systems:
  1. Extinct or no longer used regularly:
    - Kawi – The oldest known Brahmic writing system in Indonesia and the ancestor to all Brahmic based writing systems in Insular Southeast Asia.
    - Buda/Gunung – Historically used to write Old Javanese and Old Sundanese.
    - Old Sundanese – Historically used to write Sundanese before being replaced by Latin, Pegon, and Sundanese scripts.
    - Kaganga – Historically used to write Rejang, an Austronesian language from Bengkulu.
    - Jangang-Jangang – Historically used to write Makassarese before being replaced by Latin, Jawi, and Lontara scripts.
    - Bilang-Bilang – Only used for poetry in Buginese language.
    - Toba Incung – Historically used to write Batak Toba language before being replaced by Latin and Batak scripts.
    - Bada/Badaic – Historically used to write Badaic languages.
  2. Controversial scripts:
    - Malesung – Historically used to write Minahasan languages.
    - Nggahi Mbojo – Historically used to write Bima before being replaced by Latin and Lontara scripts.
    - Minang/Tamboalam – Historically used to write Minangkabau before being replaced by Latin and Jawi scripts.
    - Mongondow/Basahan – Historically used to write Mongondow before being replaced by Latin script.
    - Bonda, Tidung, and Mentawai (scripts that have little evidence and need more research).
    - Gayo, Palembang, Kanung, Sangir, Cirebon, Alifuru, and Iban/Dunging (scripts that have very little to no evidence that these scripts ever used historically).

== Sample text ==
The following texts are translations of Article 1 of the Universal Declaration of Human Rights in the languages of Indonesia.

- English

All people are born free and have the same dignity and rights. They are endowed with reason and conscience and should associate with each other in a spirit of brotherhood.

- Indonesian (Bahasa Indonesia)

Semua orang dilahirkan merdeka dan mempunyai martabat dan hak-hak yang sama. Mereka dikaruniai akal dan hati nurani dan hendaknya bergaul satu sama lain dalam semangat persaudaraan.

- Javanese (Basa Jawa or ꦧꦱꦗꦮ)

ꦱꦧꦼꦤ꧀ꦩꦤꦸꦁꦱꦏꦭꦲꦶꦫꦏꦺꦩꦂꦢꦶꦏꦭꦤ꧀ꦢꦂꦧꦺꦩꦂꦠꦧꦠ꧀ꦭꦤ꧀ꦲꦏ꧀ꦲꦏ꧀ꦏꦁꦥꦝ꧉ꦏꦧꦺꦃꦥꦶꦤꦫꦶꦔꦤ꧀ꦲꦏꦭ꧀ꦭꦤ꧀ꦏꦭ꧀ꦧꦸꦱꦂꦠꦏꦲꦗꦧ꧀ꦲꦁꦒꦺꦴꦤꦺꦥꦱꦿꦮꦸꦔꦤ꧀ꦩꦼꦩꦶꦠꦿꦤ꧀ꦱꦶꦗꦶꦭꦤ꧀ꦭꦶꦪꦤꦺꦠꦤ꧀ꦱꦃꦔꦸꦒꦺꦩꦶꦗꦶꦮꦥꦱꦺꦢꦸꦭꦸꦫꦤ꧀꧉。

Sabên manungsa kalairake mardika lan darbe martabat lan hak-hak kang padha. Kabeh pinaringan akal lan kalbu sarta kaajab anggone pasrawungan mêmitran siji lan liyane tansah ngugemi jiwa paseduluran.

- Sundanese (Basa Sunda or ᮘᮃᮞᮃ ᮞᮥᮔ᮪ᮓᮃ)

ᮞᮃᮊᮥᮙ᮪ᮔᮃ ᮏᮃᮜ᮪ᮙᮃ ᮌᮥᮘᮁᮃᮌ᮪ ᮊᮃ ᮃᮜᮃᮙ᮪ ᮓᮥᮑᮃ ᮒᮦᮂ ᮞᮤᮕᮃᮒ᮪ᮔᮃ ᮙᮨᮁᮓᮤᮊᮃ ᮏᮩᮀ ᮘᮧᮌᮃ ᮙᮃᮁᮒᮃᮘᮃᮒ᮪ ᮊᮃᮒᮥᮒ᮪ ᮠᮃᮊ᮪-ᮠᮃᮊ᮪ ᮃᮔᮥ ᮞᮃᮛᮥᮃ. ᮙᮃᮛᮃᮔᮦᮂᮔᮃ ᮓᮤᮘᮦᮛᮦ ᮃᮊᮃᮜ᮪ ᮏᮩᮀ ᮠᮃᮒᮦ ᮔᮥᮛᮃᮔᮤ, ᮎᮃᮙ᮪ᮕᮥᮁ-ᮌᮃᮅᮜ᮪ ᮏᮩᮀ ᮞᮃᮞᮃᮙᮃᮔᮃ ᮃᮚᮃ ᮓᮤᮔᮃ ᮞᮥᮙᮃᮍᮨᮒ᮪ ᮓᮥᮓᮥᮜᮥᮛᮃᮔ᮪

Sakumna jalma gubrag ka alam dunya téh sipatna merdika jeung boga martabat katut hak-hak anu sarua. Maranéhna dibéré akal jeung haté nurani, campur-gaul jeung sasamana aya dina sumanget duduluran.

- Minangkabau (Baso Minangkabau or باسو مينڠكاباو)

سادوڽو مأنسي دلهياكن مرديكا دان ڤوڽو مرتبت ساراتو حق-حق نن سامو. مريك دكارونياي اكا جو هاتي نوراني سوڤيو ساتو سامو لاين باڬاول ساروڤو اورڠ بادونسانق

Sadonyo manusia dilahiakan mardeka dan punyo martabat sarato hak-hak nan samo. Mareka dikaruniai aka jo hati nurani, supayo satu samo lain bagaul sarupo urang badunsanak.

- Buginese (Basa Ugi or ᨅᨔ ᨕᨘᨁᨗ)

ᨔᨗᨊᨗᨊᨛᨊ ᨑᨘᨄ ᨈᨕᨘ ᨑᨗ ᨍᨍᨗᨕᨂᨛᨂᨗ ᨑᨗᨒᨗᨊᨚᨕᨛ ᨊᨄᨊᨛᨊᨕᨗ ᨆᨊᨛᨂᨛᨂᨗ ᨑᨗᨕᨔᨛᨂᨛᨂᨛ ᨕᨒᨛᨅᨛᨅᨗᨑᨛᨂᨛ. ᨊᨄᨊᨕᨗ ᨑᨗᨕᨔᨛᨂᨛᨂᨛ ᨕᨀᨒᨛᨂᨛ, ᨊᨄᨊᨕᨗ ᨑᨗᨕᨔᨛᨂᨛᨂᨛ ᨕᨈᨗ ᨆᨑᨛᨊᨛᨊᨛᨊᨗ ᨊ ᨔᨗᨅᨚᨒᨛ ᨅᨚᨒᨛᨊ ᨄᨉ ᨔᨗᨄᨀᨈᨕᨘ ᨄᨉ ᨆᨔᨛᨔᨒᨔᨘᨑᨛᨂᨛ.

Sininna rupa tau ri jajiangngi rilinoe nappunnai manengngi riasengnge alebbireng. Nappunai riasengnge akkaleng, nappunai riasengnge ati marennni na sibole bolena pada sipakatau pada massalasureng.

- Balinese (Basa Bali or ᬩᬲᬩᬮᬶ)

ᬲᬫᬶᬫᬦᬸᬲᬦᬾᬲᬦᬾᬜ᭄ᬭᬸᬯᬤᬶᬯᬦ᭄ᬢᬳ᭄ᬫᬾᬃᬤᬾᬓᬢᬸᬃᬫᬤᬸᬯᬾᬓᭁᬢᬫᬦ᭄ᬮᬦ᭄ᬳᬓ᭄᭠ ᬳᬓ᭄ᬱᬦᬾᬧᬢᬾᬄ᭟ ᬲᬫᬶᬓᬮᬸᬕ᭄ᬭᬳᬶᬦ᭄ᬧᬧᬶᬦᬾᬄᬮᬦ᭄ᬳᬶᬤᬾᬧ᭄ᬢᬸᬃᬫᬗ᭄ᬤᬦᬾᬧᬤᬫᬲᬯᬶᬢ᭄ᬭᬫᬾᬮᬭᬧᬦ᭄ᬲᬾᬫᬗᬢ᭄ᬧᬓᬸᬮᬯᬃᬕᬦ᭄

Sami manusane sane nyruwadi wantah merdeka tur maduwe kautamaan lan hak-hak sane pateh. Sami kalugrain papineh lan idep tur mangdane pada masawitra melarapan semangat pakulawargaan.

- Malay (Bahasa Melayu or بهاس مل يو)

سموا مأنسي دلاهيركن بيبس دان سامرات دري سڬي كمولياان دان حق-حق. مريك ممڤوڽاءي ڤميكيرن دان ڤراسان هاتي دان هندقله برتيندق د انتارا ساتو سام لاين دڠن سماڠت ڤرسااودارأن.

Semua manusia dilahirkan bebas dan samarata dari segi kemuliaan dan hak-hak. Mereka mempunyai pemikiran dan perasaan hati dan hendaklah bertindak di antara satu sama lain dengan semangat persaudaraan.

- Batak Toba (ᯅᯖᯄ᯦᯲ ᯖᯬᯅ)

ᯘᯮᯑᯩ ᯐᯬᯞ᯲ᯔ ᯖᯮᯅᯮ ᯅᯩᯅᯘ᯲ ᯐᯞ ᯘᯒᯮᯇ ᯑᯬ ᯂᯘᯝᯇᯬᯉ᯲ ᯑᯬᯂᯬᯖ᯲ ᯂᯄ᯦᯲ᯉ. ᯑᯪᯞᯩᯂᯬᯉ᯲ ᯑᯬ ᯖᯮ ᯉᯘᯪᯑ ᯀᯄ᯦ᯞ᯲ ᯑᯬᯂᯬᯖ᯲ ᯇᯰᯎᯬᯒ ᯉᯪ ᯒᯬᯂ ᯐᯞ ᯤᯰᯄ᯦ᯬᯉ᯲ ᯔᯘᯪᯥᯒᯮᯇᯉ᯲ ᯑᯬ ᯉᯘᯪᯑ ᯑᯪ ᯅᯎᯘᯉ᯲ ᯖᯬᯉ᯲ᯑᯪ ᯇᯒ᯲ᯂᯂᯔᯒᯰᯎᯪᯀᯬᯉ᯲

Sude jolma tubu bebas jala sarupa do hasangapon dohot hakna. Dilehon do tu nasida akal dohot panggora ni roha jala ingkon masiurupan do nasida di bagasan tondi parhahamaranggion.

- Madurese (Basa Madura or باس مادورا)

سادجان اوريڠ لاهير مردكا اي ساريڠ دراجت كلابن حق-حق سي ضا-ڤاضا. سادجان ايڤرڠي عقل ساريڠ نوراني بن كودو اريڠ-ساريڠ اكنچ كادي تاريتن

Sadajana oreng lahir mardika e sarenge drajat klaban hak-hak se dha-padha. Sadajana eparenge akal sareng nurani ban kodu areng-sareng akanca kadi taretan.

- Makassarese (Basa Makassar or ᨅᨔ ᨆᨀᨔᨛᨔᨑᨛ)

ᨔᨗᨀᨚᨊᨛᨈᨘ ᨈᨕᨘ ᨊᨗᨒᨔᨛᨔᨘᨀᨂᨛ ᨅᨛᨅᨔ ᨔᨗᨕᨁᨂᨛ ᨊᨗᨕ ᨂᨔᨛᨂᨗ ᨆᨑᨛᨈᨅᨈᨛ ᨔᨗᨕᨁᨂᨛ ᨖᨀᨛ-ᨖᨀᨛᨊ. ᨕᨗᨕᨆᨗᨊᨛᨈᨘ ᨊᨗᨔᨑᨛ ᨕᨀᨒ ᨔᨗᨕᨁᨂᨛ ᨕᨈᨗ ᨊᨘᨑᨊᨗ ᨔᨗᨕᨁᨂᨛ ᨄᨑᨒᨛᨒᨘᨕᨗ ᨕᨔᨛᨔᨗᨕᨁᨂᨛ ᨆᨔᨛᨔᨗᨂᨛ-ᨆᨔᨛᨔᨗᨂᨛ ᨒᨒᨂᨛ ᨑᨚᨖᨛ ᨄᨛᨑᨛᨔᨕᨘᨉᨑᨕᨊᨛ.

Sikontu tau nilassukang bebasa siagang nia ngasengi martabat siagang hak-hakna. Iamintu nisare akkala siagang ati nurani siagang parallui assiagang massing-massing lalang roh persaudaraan.

- Musi (Baso Pelembang)

Galo-galo uwong dari lahirnyo bebas, samorato martabat jugo hak-haknyo. Wong dienjuk utak samo raso ati, kendaknyo tu begaul sesamo manusio pecak wong sedulur.

- Batak Simalungun (ᯅᯖᯃ᯳ ᯙᯫᯕᯟᯮᯝᯯᯉ᯳)

ᯅᯖᯄ᯦᯲ ᯖᯬᯅ ᯏᯉᯮᯈ᯳ ᯐᯬᯟ᯳ᯕ ᯖᯮᯅᯮᯃ᯳ ᯕᯓ᯳ᯑᯩᯃ ᯐᯉᯃ᯳ ᯙᯓᯮᯈ ᯑᯬ ᯃᯓ᯳ᯏ ᯑᯫᯓᯫ ᯁᯕ᯳ᯈ ᯃᯃ᯳ᯉᯫ. ᯁᯪᯅᯩᯓᯩ ᯑᯬ ᯅᯉᯫ ᯙᯫᯑᯩᯀ ᯈᯫᯰᯃᯫᯓᯉ᯳ ᯁᯕ᯳ᯈ ᯈᯰᯏᯬᯓ ᯉᯫ ᯁᯮᯃᯮᯓ᯳ ᯐᯉᯃ᯳ ᯕᯉᯫᯝᯬᯉ᯳ ᯕᯓ᯳ᯙᯀᯬᯓ᯳ ᯑᯬ ᯙᯫᯑᯩᯀ ᯁᯪᯅᯏᯙ᯳ ᯖᯬᯉ᯲ᯑᯮᯜ᯳ ᯈᯓ᯳ᯙᯉᯫᯉᯀᯬᯉ᯳

Ganup jolma tubuh mardeka janah sarupa do harga diri ampa hakni. Ibere do bani sidea pingkiran ampa panggora ni uhur janah maningon marsaor do sidea ibagas tonduy parsaninaon.

- Acehnese (Bahsa Acèh or بهسا اچيه)

بندوم اورڠ لاهير دڠن مرديک، دان دڠن مرتبت دان حق ڽڠ سابن. ڠن عقل ݢسميکير، ڠن هاتي ݢمراس، بندوم ڬتايو لاݢي ساودارا، حق دان کمولياءن

Bandum ureuëng lahé deungön meurdéka, dan deungön martabat dan hak nyang saban. Ngön akai geuseumiké, ngön até geumeurasa, bandum geutanyoë lagèë cèëdara. Hak ngön keumuliaan.

- Tetum (Lia-Tetun)

Ema hotu hotu moris hanesan ho dignidade ho direitu. Sira hotu iha hanoin, konsiensia n'e duni tenki hare malu hanesan espiritu maun-alin.

- Dawan (Uab Metô)

Atoni ma bife ok-okê mahonis kamafutû ma nmuî upan ma hak namnés. Sin napein tenab ma nekmeü ma sin musti nabai es nok es onlê olif-tataf.

Kanan mansian mahonis merdeka ma nok upan ma hak papmesê. Sin naheun nok tenab ma nekmeû ma sin es nok es musti nfain onlê olif-tataf.

- Batak Karo (Batak Karo)

ᯂᯩᯒᯫᯉ ᯔᯉᯬᯘᯫᯀ ᯖᯬᯆᯬᯀ᯳ ᯆᯩᯆᯘ᯳ ᯒᯘ᯳ ᯘᯩᯒᯫ ᯔᯒ᯳ᯖᯆᯖ᯳ ᯒᯘ᯳ ᯀᯂ᯳ᯉ. ᯂᯞᯂ᯳ ᯀᯩᯢ ᯀᯪᯆᯩᯒᯩᯂᯩᯉ᯳ ᯀᯂᯞ᯳ ᯒᯘ᯳ ᯇᯬᯘᯬᯀ᯳ ᯇᯩᯒᯖᯩᯉ᯳ ᯐᯉᯀ᯳ ᯀᯒᯬᯘ᯳ ᯀᯩᯒ᯳ᯘᯑ ᯀᯒᯫᯀ᯳ᯉ ᯀᯞᯬ ᯘᯩᯔᯝᯖ᯳ ᯇᯩᯒ᯳ᯘᯑᯉ᯳

Kerina manusia tubuh bebas ras seri martabat ras hakna. Kalak enda ibereken akal ras pusuh peraten janah arus ersada arihna alu semangat persadan.

- Banjar (Bahasa Banjar or بهاس بنجر)

صبراتان مأنسي درانكاكن بيبس مردكا وان باءايسي مرتبت لاون جوا باءايسي حق-حق نڠ سام. بوبوهنڽ صبراتان دباريءا عقل وان جوا ڤڠراس هاتي نوراني، سوڤاي ساموڽان اورڠ انتارا ساءايكوڠ لاون ساءايكوڠ باڤتوتن نڠكيا اورڠ بادڠسانكن

Sabarataan manusia diranakakan bibas mardika wan ba'isi martabat lawan jua ba'isi hak-hak nang sama. Bubuhannya sabarataan dibari'i akal wan jua pangrasa hati nurani, supaya samunyaan urang antara sa'ikung lawan sa'ikung bapatutan nangkaya urang badangsanakan.

- Lampung (Bahasa Lampung)

Unyin Jelema dilaheʁko merdeka jama wat pi'il ʁik hak sai gokgoh. Tiyan dikaruniako akal jama hati nurani maʁai unggal tiyan dapok nengah nyampoʁ dilom semangat muaʁiyan.

- Komering (Basa Kumoring)

Kaunyin jolma tilahirko mardeka rik uwat pi'il rik hak-hak sai goh-goh. Tiyan tiunjuk akal pikiran rik hati nurani mari tiyan dapok nyampur rik sai barihna dilom semangat bukolpah.

- Rejang (Baso Jang)

Kutê tun laher mêrdeka, tmuan hok-hok gik srai. Kutê nagiak-ba akêa peker ngen atêi, kêrno o kêlok-nê bêkuat-ba do ngen luyên lêm asai sêpasuak.

- Bengkulu Malay (Bahaso Melayu Bengkulu)

Segalo orang dilahirkan merdeka kek punyo martabat kek hak-hak yang samo. Tobonyo dikasi akal kek hati nurani supayo bekawan dalam raso cak orang besanak.

=== Comparison chart ===
Below is a chart of several Indonesian languages. All of them except for Galela belong to the Austronesian language family. While there have been misunderstandings on which ones should be classified as languages and which ones should be classified as dialects, the chart confirms that many have similarities, yet are not mutually comprehensible. The languages are arranged geographically.

| English translations | one | two | three | four | water | person | house | dog | cat | coconut | day | new | we, us | I/me | you | yes | no | what | and |
|---|---|---|---|---|---|---|---|---|---|---|---|---|---|---|---|---|---|---|---|
| Indonesian | satu | dua | tiga | empat | air | orang | rumah | anjing | kucing | kelapa | hari | baru | kita/kami | saya/aku | Anda/kamu/kau | ya/iya | tidak | apa | dan |
| Minangkabau | cie' | duo | tigo | ampe' | aie | urang | rumah | anjiang | kuciang | karambia | hari | baru | awak | denai/ambo | awak/ang | iyo | indak | apo | jo |
| Palembang Malay | sikok | duo | tigo | empat | banyu | wong | rumah | anjing | kucing | kelapo | ari | baru | kito | aku/wong | kabba/kamu | iyo | dido | apo | dan |
| Betawi | atu' | dué | tigé | empat | aér | orang | ruméh | anjing | kucing | kelapé | ari | baru | kité | ane/gue/gua | ente/lu/loe | iye | kagak | apé | amé |
| Banjarese | asa | dua | talu | ampat | banyu | urang | rumah | hadupan | batingas | nyiur | hari | hanyar | kita | aku | kauw | | | apa | wan |
| Kutainese | satu | due | tige | empat | ranam | urang | rumah | koyok | | nyiur | hari | beru | etam | | | | | apa | dengan |
| Manado Malay | satu | dua | tiga | ampa | aer | orang | ruma | anjing | kucing | kalapa | hari | baru | torang | kita/saya | ngana/torang | io | nda' | apa | deng |
| Ambonese Malay | satu | dua | tiga | ampa | air | orang | ruma | anjing | kucing | kalapa | hari | baru | katong | kita/saya | ngana | iyo | seng | apa | deng |
| Acehnese | sa | dua | lhèë | peuët | ië | ureuëng | rumoh | asèë | miong / miei | u | uroë | ban | geutanyoë | lon | droeneuh | nye | keun | peuë | ngon |
| Nias | sara | dua | tölu | öfa | idanö | niha | omo | asu | mao | banio | luo | bohou | ya'ita | | | | | hadia | ba |
| Toba Batak | sada | dua | tolu | opat | aek | halak | jabu | biang | huting | harambiri | ari | ibbaru | hita | au | ho | olo | daong | aha | dohot |
| Mandailing Batak | sada | dua | tolu | opat | aek | halak | bagas | asu | | arambir | ari | baru | hita | | | | | aha | dohot |
| Lampung | say | ʁuwa | telu | ampat | way | jelema | nuwa | asu | kucing | nyiwi | ʁani | ampai | ʁam | | | | | api | jama |
| Komering | osai | rua | tolu | opak | uway | jolma | lombahan | asu | kucing | nyiwi | harani | ompai/anyar | ram/kita | | | | | apiya | rik |
| Rejang (of Lebong dialect) | do | duai | tlau | pat | bioa | tun manusio | umêak | kuyuk | kucing | nioa | bilai | blau | itê | uku | | | coa | jano, gen | ngen, magêa |
| Sundanese | hiji | dua | tilu | opat | cai/ci | jalma | imah | anjing | ucing | kalapa | poé | anyar | urang | abdi/aing | eta/anjeun | enya | henteu | naon | jeung |
| Javanese | siji | loro | têlu | papat | banyu | uwòng | omah | asu | kucing | kambìl | dinå | anyar/énggal | adhéwé | aku | kowe | iya/wis | ora | åpå/anu | lan |
| Madurese | settong | dhuwa' | tello' | empa' | âêng | oreng | roma | pate' | kochèng | nyior | are | anyar | sengko | kaulâh | be'na | iyâ | phunten | apa | bèn |
| Balinese | besik | dadua | telu | papat | yéh | jadma | umah | cicing/kuluk | méong | nyuh | rahina | mara | iraga | tiang | ragane | nggih | ten | apa | muah/lan |
| Sasak | sa/seke' | due | telu | mpat | aik | dengan | bale | acong/basong | | kenyamen/nyioh | jelo | baru | ite | | | | | ape | dait |
| Bima | ica | dua | tolu | upa | oi | dou | uma | lako | ngao | ni'u | nai | bou | nami | | | | | au | labo |
| Ngaju Dayak | ije' | due' | telu' | epat | danum | uluh | huma' | asu | posa | enyuh | andau | taheta | itah | | | | | narai | tuntang |
| Kenyah Dayak | sé | dué | telew | pat | sungai | kelunan / klunan | lamin / uma' | asew | séang | nyo | dau | maring | mé' tew / teleu | | | | | inew | ngan |
| Torajan | misa | daʼdua | tallu | aʼpaʼ | uai | tau | banua | asu | serreʼ | kaluku | allo | mabaru | kita | aku | iko | io | taeʼ | apa | sisola |
| Mandar | mesaʼ | daʼdua | tallu | appeʼ | wai | tau | boyang | asu | posa | anjoro | allo | baru | ita | yau | iʼo | | | apa | |
| Buginese | seddi | dua | tellu | eppa | waé | tau | bola | asu | meong | kaluku | esso | ma-baru | idiʼ | iyaʼ | iko | ieʼ | déʼ | aga | sibawa |
| Makassarese | seʼre | rua | tallu | appaʼ | jeʼneʼ | tau | ballaʼ | kongkong | miong | kaluku | allo | beru | ikatte | inakke | ikau | io, ieʼ | tena | apa | siagang |
| Mongondow | tobatú | doyowa | toḷu | opat | tubig | intau | baḷoi | ungkú | pinggó | bangó | singgai | mo-bagu | kita | | | | | onu | bo |
| Tolaki | o'aso | o'ruo | o'tolu | o'omba | iwoi | toono | laika | odahu | | kaluku | oleo | wuohu | inggito | | | | | ohawo | ronga |
| Galela | moi | sinoto | sa'ange | iha | ake | nyawa | tahu | kaso | | igo | wange | ḋamomuane | ngone | | | | | okia | de |
| Biak | oser/eser | suru | kyor | fyak | war | snon/kawasa | rum | naf/rofan | pus | sray | ras | babo | ko | | | | | sa | ma/kuker |
| Tetum | ida | rua | tolu | haat | bee | ema | uma | asu | busa | nuu | loron | foun | ami | | | | | ne'ebé | no |
| Mandarin Chinese | 一 (yī) | 二 (èr) | 三 (sān) | 四 (sì) | 水 (shuǐ) | 人 (rén) | 房子 (fángzi) | 狗 (gǒu) | 猫 (māo) | 椰子 (yēzi) | 天 (tiān) | 新的 (xīnde) | 我们 (wǒmen) | 我 (wǒ) | 你 (nǐ) | 是的 (Shì de) | 不 (bù) | 什么 (shénme) | 和 (hé) |
| Dutch | een | twee | drie | vier | water | persoon | huis | hond | kat | kokosnoot | dag | nieuw | wij/ons | ik/mij | u/jij/jou | ja | nee | wat | en |

== See also ==
- Languages of Sulawesi
- Languages of Kalimantan
- List of languages in Indonesia
