= Lepki people =

Lepki
Bridal

Total population
- 302 (2007)

Regions with significant populations
- Indonesia (Highland Papua)

Languages
- Lepki

Related ethnic groups
- Yetfa • Kembra • Murkim

The Lepki people, also known as Bridal, are an ethnic group that mainly lives on the banks of the Sobger River in Bintang Mountain Regency, Highland Papua.

== Etymology ==
The name "Lepki" is an exonym given to this ethnic group by the Ketengban people. In the Ketengban language, it means "people who live in the lowlands" since they reside along the banks of the Sobger River. Meanwhile, the Lepki people refer to themselves as "Bridal," which is a combination of Bri, meaning "lowlands," and dame, meaning "our language."

The Sobger River is called Armasi in the Yetfa and Lepki, meaning "a river that flows far to the north." The river flows from the Okmay region (Ketengban's territory) to the Mamberamo River. Because they live near the Armasi River, the Lepki people also refer to themselves as the "Armasi people."

== Language ==
According to local legend, Ait Aba Kibitrum (the Supreme Creator) gave the Lepki people the language for communication called the Rani language. Linguists initially did not classify this language, but it was eventually grouped into the Southern Pauwasi language family along with Yetfa-Biksi, Kimki, Kembra, and Murkim.

In the pronunciation of the Rani language, there are two dialects/accents divided between two regions. The first region comprises Luban, Wei, and Yuaban, while the second comprises Aboy, Murme, and Teiraplu. The dialect of the first region predominantly uses the letter [R], whereas the second region predominantly uses the letter [L]. The Lepki people have a distinctive greeting, expressed with the phrase Yelako.

== Clans ==
The clan names of the Lepki people include: Belbora, Bera, Borgertora, Bukdamtora, Dalidam, Dalitora, Deira, Digiseira, Diyapra, Kedapra, Kremtestora, Kromtisra, Kuatnyera, Kwelkwapra, Lora, Lukaipra, Mapkertora, Nukaipra, Nyanyera, Tefra, Timisnyera, Toborgertora, Tuapra, Widibera, and Winma. Most Lepki clan names end with -ra, as ra means 'people'. This naming pattern can also be found among some neighboring tribes of the Lepki, such as the Sumatra and Udamesra clans of the Kosare people, as well as clans from the Kembra people.

== Customary land ==
Melkior N.N. Sitokdana & Nukaipra (2018), in their book, Culture and History of the Lepki Tribe, explain that the Lepki people are located in the northern part of Bintang Mountain Regency. The area inhabited by this tribe is part of the Okmekmin (La Pago) customary land and is bordered by four tribes: Yetfa, Kimki, Ketengban, and Kosadle/Kosare. This area is relatively small compared to the surrounding tribes, covering only about 400 km².

Initially, the Lepki people did not live in villages but in small settlements within clan territories. The settlements were based on nearness to natural resources such as sago. Clan territories were usually named after hills, rivers, and other natural resources, such as Askei, Iorger, Itarger, Yalembri, Dali, and Raskilo. After villages were established, such as Teiraplu, which was built near an airstrip, these settlements became centers of trade and communication. However, most of the Lepki people still reside in their clan territories.

The villages built within the Lepki customary territory include:

- Teiraplu, located along the Dakerto River
- Yuaban, located along the Yua River
- Luban, located along the Lau River
- Aboy, located along the Kelnje/Ngeme River

== Traditional house ==
Lepki's traditional house is called Tinmin and is often referred to in Indonesian as rumah payung ("umbrella house") because of its umbrella-like shaped roof. These houses are typically built using large tree trunks, which are combined to form the building. Tinmin also resembles a stilt house, although it has no walls. According to local beliefs, walls make it difficult to see incoming enemy attacks. The ground floor can be used for livestock, while the umbrella-shaped roof is made from dried sago leaves.

A single Tinmin can accommodate around 30 people, with each family having its own fireplace for about 7 to 12 in total. Women and children sleep at one edge of the house, while men sleep at the other edge. A dancing floor is usually built lower and is flexible and tied with rattan ropes so it can move horizontally.

In addition to Tinmin, the Lepki people also build two other types of houses:

1. Yumin house. A house that is similar to Tinmin but smaller and without an umbrella-like roof.
2. Ketengban-style house. It resembles honai houses, especially in village areas.

== Traditional clothes ==
The traditional attire of Lepki men consists of a small ball-shaped genital cover, not a koteka. This is called nega and is made from small fruits that are drilled and then dried in hot ash. The nega is not tied but simply placed on top of the penis. Today, although most Lepki men wear pants, some still wear nega underneath their pants. The traditional attire for Lepki women consists of grass or reed skirts called net. They grow their reeds, which are then cut and tied in layers onto a string.

Other accessories include body paint in colors such as yellow, black, gray, and white from earth, as well as red from earth and tree bark. Body piercings on the ears and nose are made from animal bones, especially wild boar tusks, which are worn on the nose during war. Additionally, they wear necklaces made of shell rings called kipfan in Lepki or telaga in Yetfa. The Lepki people have also begun tattooing their bodies, a new tradition originating from the east, usually done with needles and battery contents.
