= Pauwasi =

Pauwasi may refer to:

- Pauwasi languages
- East Pauwasi languages
- West Pauwasi languages
- South Pauwasi languages
- Pauwasi River
