= South Pauwasi languages =

Language family of New Guinea

South Pauwasi
- Yetfa – South Pauwasi River
- Geographic distribution: Papua: Pegunungan Bintang Regency
- Linguistic classification: Pauwasi: South Pauwasi
- Subdivisions: Yetfa; Kimki; Lepki–Murkim

Language codes
- Glottolog: None

The South Pauwasi languages are a likely small language family of New Guinea, potentially consisting of Yetfa, Kimki, Lepki, Murkim and Kembra.

== Classification ==
Usher (2020) classifies the languages as follows,

Yetfa – South Pauwasi River

- Yetfa
- South Pauwasi River
  - Kimki
  - Lepki–Murkim
    - Kembra
    - Lepki
    - Murkim

The relationship of the five languages was recognized in the early 2000s as Paul Whitehouse assembled unpublished data from the Summer Institute of Linguistics. Usher classifies them as a branch of the Pauwasi language family. Søren Wichmann (2013) agrees that Murkim and Lepki at least appear to be very closely related. Foley (2018) accepts that Kembra, which is very poorly attested, may be related as well.

== Cognates ==
Some cognates connecting the languages are as follows. There are also loanwords in common with Pyu.

South Pauwasi cognates
gloss	Yetfa	Kimki	Kembra	Lepki	Murkim
water	ket, kel	di	er	kɛl	kel
two			kais	kaisi	kais
head		anok		no-tɛl	anok
leaf		bwaitʰ (?)		-βai	bwaik
skin/bark		it-'ba		jit	jaitʰ
worm		briɸ		brɛp	breɸ
louse	(n)jim	-nim	nim	nɪm	ɪm
hair		itʰ	-jet	jɛt	
ear		bwa		bwi	bwi
eye	iː	ɛ̃	ji	jɛ-mɔn	
coconut		was-		wæjs	wais-
speech	ma	mi		mi-	mi
knife	tema	tma		tə̆'ma	tma
canoe	kuf	õːp		kuβ	kuɸ
shit	ɲan	ain		-ɲa	njah ~ iãh
person		ap ~ aɸ	rá-	ra	ɸra
egg	nela		-lĕl	dɛl	nel
fire/wood	jao (tree)		já	ja	jo ~ ja-
house	nam	meː		nim	mi
laugh	mamla			-mwel-o	mwalo
this	si	si			si
cloud	kos			kos-	kos-
tongue		arbak		braw	prouk
tail			nókwa	jouk	jakʷat~ɲakʷat
white		lʊ		dol-	lol
far		uje~udʒe		w̆ijɛ	wije~uje-
come		-ki-		guj-	kʷi
1pl		name			nakme
2pl		same			sakme-re
