= Leonard Schultze =

Leonard Schultze may refer to:

- Leonard Schultze languages, of Papua New Guinea
- Leonard Schultze River, of Papua New Guinea
- Leonhard Schultze-Jena (1872–1955), German zoologist and anthropologist
- Leonard Schultze, founder of Schultze & Weaver
