= Lepki–Murkim languages =

Unclassified language group of New Guinea

Lepki–Murkim
- Geographic distribution: Papua: Pegunungan Bintang Regency
- Linguistic classification: Pauwasi or independent language family: Southern; Lepki–Murkim
- Subdivisions: Lepki; Murkim; ?Kembra

Language codes
- Glottolog: lepk1239

The Lepki–Murkim languages are two to three recently identified languages of New Guinea, Lepki, Murkim and possibly Kembra.

Øystein Lund Andersen has written an ethnography sketch on the Lepki that includes a wordlist of Lepki language and songs.

== Classification ==
In 2007, on a Papuan language website, Mark Donohue reported that,

Murkim [and] Lepki [and] Kembra are, along with a number of other languages, unclassified groups living between the main cordillera and Mt. 6234, in the north of Papua near the PNG border (where 'near' = up to about 6 days' walk). They don't appear to be related to each other, based on wordlists, and they don't appear to show external affiliations.

However, Søren Wichmann (2013) found that Murkim and Lepki at least appear to be very closely related, a position accepted by Glottolog. Usher (2018) classifies the three languages in the southern branch of the Pauwasi family. Foley (2018) classifies them separately as an independent language family. Foley (2018) also classifies Kembra and Kembra as isolates, but does not exclude the possibility of their being related to Lepki–Murkim.

== Basic vocabulary ==
Basic vocabulary of Lepki and Murkim showing cognates and non-cognates listed in Foley (2018):

Lepki family basic vocabulary
gloss	Lepki	Murkim
‘bird’	afai	afi
‘blood’	yiri	mal
‘bone’	kɔw	kok
‘breast’	nom	mam
‘ear’	bwi	bwi
‘eat’	ɲis	ɲẽlo
‘egg’	haiden	nel
‘eye’	yɛmon	amol
‘fire’	yaɣala	yo
‘give’	ken o	knewo
‘go’	aːro	haro
‘ground’	tɛtɛp	andok
‘hair’	yɛt	(inok-)ʔtair
‘hear’	ofa o	fao
‘I’	aro	nuːk
‘leg’	kol	ba
‘louse’	nɪm	im
‘man’	rawil	frawil
‘moon’	roɣivei	kaya(bi)
‘name’	gye	ka ~ kako
‘one’	kutuɣap	hel
‘road, path’	masin	mesain
‘see’	boɣo	bowo
‘sky’	yiris ilaɣo	smomya
‘stone’	sauf	oːn
‘sun’	mom	kayakalo
‘tongue’	braw	prouk
‘tooth’	kal	kal
‘tree’	ya	yamul
‘two’	kaisi	kais
‘water’	kel	kel
‘we’	yiris	nakmere
‘woman’	konan	wonak
‘you (sg)’	yoyo	hak(o)
