= List of languages by number of native speakers in Indonesia =

Population 5 years old and upward, Language Used at home Everyday 2011

Ranked	Everyday language group	number	%
1	Javanese	68,044,660	31.79
2	Indonesian	42,682,566	19.94
3	Sundanese	32,412,752	15.14
4	Malay	7,901,386	3.69
5	Madurese	7,743,533	3.62
6	Minangkabau	4,232,226	1.98
7	Banjarese	3,651,626	1.71
8	Buginese	3,510,249	1.64
9	Balinese	3,371,049	1.57
10	Batak languages	3,318,360	1.55
11	Cirebonese	3,086,721	1.44
12	Other Languages of East Nusa Tenggara	3,004,120	1.40
13	Sasak	2,691,127	1.26
14	Acehnese	2,550,055	1.19
15	Betawi	2,244,648	1.05
16	Malay-based creoles	2,243,000	1.05
17	Palembang Malay/Musi/Sekayu	2,181,769	1.02
18	Other languages of South Sulawesi	1,953,592	0.91
19	Makassarese	1,644,300	0.77
20	Papuan languages	1,643,325	0.77
21	Languages of Maluku	1,616,240	0.76
22	Other languages of Dayaks	1,478,696	0.69
23	Bengkulu Malay	1,438,278	0.67
24	Other spoken languages in Sumatra	1,345,387	0.63
25	Other languages of Southeast Sulawesi	1,047,750	0.49
26	Other languages of West Nusa Tenggara	1,020,035	0.48
27	Other languages of Lampung province	914,656	0.43
28	Other languages of North Sulawesi	875,861	0.41
29	Other Sulawesi languages	812,851	0.38
30	Languages of Kalimantan	758,010	0.35
31	Nias	747,168	0.35
32	Unknown	561,711	0.26
33	Other languages of Aceh	532,814	0.25
34	Foreign languages, including: Arabic; Chinese; Dutch; English; Filipino; Hakka; Hokkien; Japanese; Korean; Mandarin; Portuguese; Punjabi; Sindhi; Spanish; Tamil	443,973	0.21
35	Sign languages	40,373	0.02
	Total	214,056,929	100.00
