= Papi–Asaba languages =

Family of languages in Papua New Guinea

Papi–Asaba
- Papi; Frieda and Kenu Rivers
- Geographic distribution: Sepik River basin, Papua New Guinea
- Linguistic classification: Sepik: Leonhard Schultze; Papi–Asaba
- Subdivisions: Papi; Suarmin

Language codes
- Glottolog: None

The Papi and Asaba languages form a small family of two somewhat distantly related languages of northern Papua New Guinea, namely Papi and Suarmin (Asaba).

Donald Laycock (1973) classified them as part of a Walio–Papi, a.k.a. Leonhard Schultze, branch of his Sepik–Ramu proposal. Malcolm Ross (2005) breaks up Walio–Papi, and suggests that the Papi languages may instead be part of the Sepik Hill branch of the (now Sepik) family. Glottolog does not find the evidence of a Papi family to be convincing. Foley (2018) and Usher (2020) retain them in Leonhard Schultze.
