= Lepki language =

Pauwasi language spoken in Western New Guinea

Lepki
- Native to: Western New Guinea
- Region: Highland Papua: Pegunungan Bintang Regency - Teiraplu, Yetfa, and Aboy districts, west of the Sobger River
- Ethnicity: Lepki
- Native speakers: (530 cited 1991)
- Language family: Pauwasi: South Pauwasi; Yetfa – South Pauwasi; Lepki–Murkim; Lepki

Language codes
- ISO 639-3: lpe
- Glottolog: lepk1238
- ELP: Lepki

Lepki is a Papuan language spoken in Western New Guinea, near its relatives Murkim and Kembra in Highland Papua. Only a few hundred words have been recorded, in hastily collected word lists.

Øystein Lund Andersen (2007) has unpublished ethnography on the Lepki that includes a word list.

== Phonology ==
Lepki is a tonal language.
