= Kembra =

Kembra may be,

- Kembra language
- Kembra Pfahler
