= Oktem =

- Village
- Location in Western New Guinea and Indonesia Oktem (Indonesia)
- Coordinates: 4°46′49.2456″S 140°47′7.836″E
- Country: Indonesia
- Province: Highland Papua
- Regency: Pegunungan Bintang Regency
- District: Oklip
- Elevation: 11,801 ft (3,597 m)

Population (2010)
  - Total: 301
- Time zone: UTC+9 (Indonesia Eastern Standard Time)

Oktem is a village in Pegunungan Bintang Regency, Highland Papua province, Indonesia. It is located at around 4°46′49.2456″S 140°47′7.836″E, in the elevation of around 3,597 metres. Its population is 301.

== Climate ==
Oktem has a very mild and very wet version of an alpine tundra climate with cold and rainy weather year-round. Its one of the very few places with tundra climate which can support tree and forest growth because of its mildness.

Climate data for Oktem
Month	Jan	Feb	Mar	Apr	May	Jun	Jul	Aug	Sep	Oct	Nov	Dec	Year
Mean daily maximum °C (°F)	15.6 (60.1)	15.6 (60.1)	14.9 (58.8)	14.5 (58.1)	13.8 (56.8)	13.0 (55.4)	12.4 (54.3)	12.3 (54.1)	13.4 (56.1)	14.9 (58.8)	15.4 (59.7)	15.6 (60.1)	14.3 (57.7)
Daily mean °C (°F)	9.8 (49.6)	9.9 (49.8)	9.6 (49.3)	9.2 (48.6)	8.9 (48.0)	8.2 (46.8)	8.0 (46.4)	7.8 (46.0)	8.2 (46.8)	9.0 (48.2)	9.1 (48.4)	9.6 (49.3)	8.9 (48.1)
Mean daily minimum °C (°F)	4.0 (39.2)	4.2 (39.6)	4.4 (39.9)	4.0 (39.2)	4.1 (39.4)	3.5 (38.3)	3.6 (38.5)	3.3 (37.9)	3.0 (37.4)	3.1 (37.6)	2.9 (37.2)	3.7 (38.7)	3.7 (38.6)
Average precipitation mm (inches)	444 (17.5)	416 (16.4)	468 (18.4)	403 (15.9)	424 (16.7)	438 (17.2)	440 (17.3)	397 (15.6)	373 (14.7)	451 (17.8)	403 (15.9)	442 (17.4)	5,099 (200.8)
Source: Climate-Data.org
