= YBX =

YBX or ybx may refer to:

- YBX, IATA code for Lourdes-de-Blanc-Sablon Airport, Côte-Nord, Quebec, Canada
- ybx, ISO 639-3 code for Yawiyo language, East Sepik Province, Papua New Guinea
