= Pai language =

Pai language may refer to:

- Pe language or Pai, a minor Plateau language of Nigeria
- Pei language or Pai, a Sepik language spoken in Papua-New Guinea
- Pai languages, a subgroup of the Yuman–Cochimí language family of North America
- Pai language (Bantu), related to Sotho
- Bai language (formerly romanized as Pai), a Sino-Tibetan language spoken in Yunnan, China

== See also ==
- Pay language
