= Walio language =

Sepik language of Papua-New Guinea

Walio
- Native to: Papua New Guinea
- Region: East Sepik Province
- Native speakers: 230 (2003)
- Language family: Sepik: Leonhard Schultze; Walio; Walio

Language codes
- ISO 639-3: wla
- Glottolog: nucl1453
- ELP: Walio
- Coordinates: 4.409276°S 142.227361°E

Walio is a Sepik language spoken in East Sepik Province, Papua-New Guinea. It is spoken in Walio village (4.409276°S 142.227361°E) of Tunap/Hunstein Rural LLG in East Sepik Province.
