= Kimki people =

Kimki
Total population
- 500 (2004)

Regions with significant populations
- Batom District, Bintang Mountains Regency, Highland Papua

Languages
- Kimki

Kimki people (also known as the Sukubatong or Sukubatom) are an ethnic group that lives in Batom, Bintang Mountains Regency, Highland Papua.

== History ==
In the past, the Kimki people lived a nomadic lifestyle. In 1973, a missionary named Jack Hook introduced Christianity to the Kimki. The Kimki population was estimated at 350 in 1978.

== Religion ==
The Kimki people adhere to Protestantism, combined with elements of their traditional beliefs.

== Language ==
The Kimki people speak Kimki. In 2019, the Bible was translated into Kimki.

== Livelihood ==
Kimki people depend on hunting, harvesting sago, gardening, and collecting agarwood for their daily lives.

== Bibliography ==
- Kartidaya Sahabat Indonesia (2025). Suku Kimki WILAYAH PAPUA PEGUNUNGAN (PDF) (Report). Kartidaya Sahabat Indonesia.
