= Tuwari language =

Sepik language of Papua-New Guinea

Tuwari
- Native to: Papua New Guinea
- Region: Sandaun Province
- Native speakers: (360 cited 2000 census)
- Language family: Sepik: Leonhard Schultze; Walio; Tuwari

Language codes
- ISO 639-3: tww
- Glottolog: tuwa1242
- ELP: Tuwari

Tuwari is a Sepik language spoken in Sandaun Province, Papua-New Guinea.
