= Leonhard Schultze languages =

Family of Papuan languages

Leonhard Schultze
- Walio–Papi
- Geographic distribution: Leonard Schultze River, Papua New Guinea
- Linguistic classification: Sepik: Leonhard Schultze
- Subdivisions: Walio; Papi–Asaba

Language codes
- Glottolog: None

The Leonhard Schultze (Leonard Schultze) or Walio–Papi languages are a proposed family of about 6 Papuan languages spoken in the Sepik river basin of northern Papua New Guinea. They are spoken along the border region of East Sepik Province and Sandaun Province, just to the south of the Iwam languages.

The languages are named after the Leonhard Schultze River, which is in turn named after German anthropologist Leonhard Schultze-Jena.

== Languages ==
The Leonhard Schultze languages are:

- Leonhard Schultze languages
  - Walio languages
    - Walio
    - Pei
    - Yawiyo
    - Tuwari
  - Papi–Asaba languages
    - Papi
    - Suarmin

== Classification ==
The Leonhard Schultze languages were traditionally classified by Laycock and Z'graggen (1975) as part of the Sepik language family.

Foley (2018) classifies the Leonhard Schultze languages separately as an independent language family rather than as part of the Sepik languages (as in previous classifications proposed by others). However, this classification is not accepted by Glottolog, which splits up the Walio and Papi branches and considers them each to be a primary language family.

== Vocabulary comparison ==
The following basic vocabulary words are from Conrad and Dye (1975), as cited in the Trans-New Guinea database.

The words cited constitute translation equivalents, whether they are cognate (e.g. tiᵽo, tipafu for “head”) or not (e.g. aᵽayo, toefahewa for “skin”).

gloss	Walio	Yawiyo (Wosawari dialect)	Papi
head	tiᵽo	tipafu	auwiyu
hair	tiřeʔ	yei	ařupisi
ear	aᵽoᵽo	afe	mʌgʌnaba
eye	nogub̶ʌnɛ	nimau	sunweyo
nose	tʌᵽsɛᵽoʔ	tɩmʌsi	tʌnipɔku
tooth	nʌᵽaᵽala	nʌfe	sʋmunu
tongue	nʌgʌya	tanotai	sakeyo
louse	natʌᵽi	dibafuyei	ařupɩsɩ
dog	kauwaᵽo	ifau; ivau	agabu
pig	taǏib̶o	ami ami	tʌmaub̶o
bird		auma	ɔb̶ɔ; ɔːsani
egg	naᵽu	aumufu	usouyo
blood	liʔ	teyuowa	taneke
bone	ipalib̶o	ihuwa	naikʌmio
skin	aᵽayo	toefahewa	pʌsiyæ
breast	matʌᵽulo	mama	abiyaiɔ
tree	biᵽoʔ	yanu	naːb̶ʌkʌ
man	ɛlɛgobuwo	to; to iːwa	sanoᵽo
woman	tɔkotʌb̶isia	sauto	suːbu
water	ǥwei	utlauwe	ařukowa
fire	linati	tanuwa; tiyami	řiku
stone	ᵽuboʔ	tab̶iya	tab̶iyaio
road, path	ʔɛᵽobu	efʌmowa	pʌbřiyaio
eat	kanab̶o	afaʔunařu	opo akepo
one	aǏia gʌǏaǏilau	ařʌsʌbau	sunuboku
two	ǥuřaǥaʔ	ařʌfři	suwʌbiyaio
