= Pengiki Besar Island =

Island in Indonesia

Native name: Pulau Pengiki Besar
- Interactive map of Pengiki Besar Island

Geography
- Coordinates: 0°14′42″N 108°02′24″E
- Adjacent to: South China Sea

Pengiki Besar Island (Indonesian: Pulau Pengiki Besar), also known as St. Barbe Island is an island in the South China Sea. The island is part of Indonesia.

== Description ==
The island has two bays, and its waters are heavily populated with coral. The island is heavily forested.
