= Wantem =

- Village
- Location in Papua and Indonesia Wantem (Indonesia)
- Coordinates: 4°48′2.24″S 140°50′3.90″E
- Country: Indonesia
- Province: Papua
- Regency: Pegunungan Bintang Regency
- District: Kiwirok Timur District
- Elevation: 6,880 ft (2,097 m)

Population (2010)
  - Total: 186
- Time zone: UTC+9 (Indonesia Eastern Standard Time)

Wantem is a village in Kiwirok Timur district, Pegunungan Bintang Regency in Highland Papua province, Indonesia. Its population is 186.

== Climate ==
Wantem has a very wet subtropical highland climate (Cfb) with very heavy rainfall year-round.

Climate data for Wantem
Month	Jan	Feb	Mar	Apr	May	Jun	Jul	Aug	Sep	Oct	Nov	Dec	Year
Mean daily maximum °C (°F)	22.4 (72.3)	22.2 (72.0)	21.9 (71.4)	21.9 (71.4)	21.5 (70.7)	20.9 (69.6)	20.4 (68.7)	20.3 (68.5)	21.1 (70.0)	21.9 (71.4)	22.5 (72.5)	22.4 (72.3)	21.6 (70.9)
Daily mean °C (°F)	17.3 (63.1)	17.1 (62.8)	17.1 (62.8)	17.0 (62.6)	16.9 (62.4)	16.2 (61.2)	16.1 (61.0)	15.9 (60.6)	16.2 (61.2)	16.6 (61.9)	16.9 (62.4)	17.1 (62.8)	16.7 (62.1)
Mean daily minimum °C (°F)	12.2 (54.0)	12.1 (53.8)	12.3 (54.1)	12.1 (53.8)	12.3 (54.1)	11.6 (52.9)	11.8 (53.2)	11.6 (52.9)	11.3 (52.3)	11.4 (52.5)	11.4 (52.5)	11.9 (53.4)	11.8 (53.3)
Average precipitation mm (inches)	523 (20.6)	462 (18.2)	558 (22.0)	494 (19.4)	536 (21.1)	584 (23.0)	582 (22.9)	517 (20.4)	472 (18.6)	540 (21.3)	462 (18.2)	495 (19.5)	6,225 (245.2)
Source: Climate-Data.org
