= Kimki language =

Pauwasi language spoken in Indonesia

Kimki
- Sukubatom
- Native to: Indonesia
- Region: Papua: Pegunungan Bintang Regency, Batom District, near Sepik River entrance to Papua New Guinea
- Ethnicity: Kimki
- Native speakers: 500 (2004)
- Language family: Pauwasi: South Pauwasi; Kimki

Language codes
- ISO 639-3: sbt
- Glottolog: kimk1238
- ELP: Kimki

Kimki (Aipki) or Sukubatom (Sukubatong) is a South Pauwasi language of Batom District, Pegunungan Bintang Regency, Papua, Indonesia. Foley classifies Kimki as a language isolate, although he notes some similarities with Murkim. Usher demonstrates a connection to the other South Pauwasi languages.

An automated computational analysis (ASJP 4) by Müller et al. (2013) found lexical similarities with Pyu. However, since the analysis was automatically generated, the grouping could be either due to mutual lexical borrowing or genetic inheritance.

Dialects include the varieties spoken in Batom and Sabi villages (Rumaropen 2004).

== Pronouns ==
Pronouns are:

Kimki independent pronouns
	sg	pl
1	win	name
2	fume	same
3	mame	

== Basic vocabulary ==
Basic vocabulary of Kimki listed in Foley (2018):

Kimki basic vocabulary
gloss	Kimki
‘bird’	ã
‘blood’	afupla
‘bone’	kwal
‘breast’	mua
‘ear’	bwa
‘eat’	auko
‘egg’	im
‘eye’	ẽ
‘fire’	kamop
‘give’	an
‘go’	bi ~ kaik
‘ground’	nim
‘hair’	it
‘hear’	fas
‘leg’	up
‘louse’	nim
‘man’	ap
‘moon’	lokaya
‘name’	aip ~ mi
‘one’	amatri
‘road, path’	bagin
‘see’	weː
‘sky’	fim
‘stone’	kwil
‘sun’	bwakaya
‘tongue’	albak
‘tooth’	luː
‘tree’	maul
‘two’	alas
‘water’	dɪ
‘woman’	kiam

== Sentences ==
Some example sentences in Kimki from Rumaropen (2004), as quoted in Foley (2018):

warime mame aik
yesterday 3 come
‘He came yesterday.’

mame mambak me bi
3 village OBL go
‘She went to the village.’

mame kaes augo
3 cooked.rice eat
‘She eats cooked rice.’

mame wambani wel-aba-me an
3 money 1SG.POSS?-father-OBL? give
‘She gave money to my father.’

Only 12 sentence examples are given by Rumaropen (2004). Other than that, there are virtually no other sentences and texts available for Kimki.
