= Yawiyo language =

Sepik language of Papua-New Guinea

Yawiyo
- Native to: Papua New Guinea
- Region: East Sepik Province
- Native speakers: (66 cited 2000 census)
- Language family: Sepik: Leonhard Schultze; Walio; Yawiyo

Language codes
- ISO 639-3: ybx
- Glottolog: yawi1238
- ELP: Yawiyo

Yawiyo (Yabio) is a Sepik language spoken in East Sepik Province, Papua-New Guinea.
