= Oklip =

- Village
- Location in Western New Guinea and Indonesia Oklip (Indonesia)
- Coordinates: 4°45′39.1788″S 140°46′50.7936″E
- Country: Indonesia
- Province: Highland Papua
- Regency: Pegunungan Bintang Regency
- District: Oklip District
- Elevation: 8,278 ft (2,523 m)

Population (2010)
  - Total: 201
- Time zone: UTC+9 (Indonesia Eastern Standard Time)

Oklip is a village in Oklip district, Pegunungan Bintang Regency in Highland Papua province, Indonesia. Its population is 201.

== Climate ==
Oklip has a very wet Subtropical highland climate (Cfb) with very heavy rainfall year-round.

Climate data for Oklip
Month	Jan	Feb	Mar	Apr	May	Jun	Jul	Aug	Sep	Oct	Nov	Dec	Year
Mean daily maximum °C (°F)	20.5 (68.9)	20.5 (68.9)	20.1 (68.2)	19.9 (67.8)	19.4 (66.9)	18.8 (65.8)	18.3 (64.9)	18.1 (64.6)	19.0 (66.2)	20.1 (68.2)	20.6 (69.1)	20.6 (69.1)	19.7 (67.4)
Daily mean °C (°F)	15.1 (59.2)	15.2 (59.4)	15.1 (59.2)	14.8 (58.6)	14.6 (58.3)	14.1 (57.4)	13.9 (57.0)	13.6 (56.5)	13.9 (57.0)	14.6 (58.3)	14.8 (58.6)	15.1 (59.2)	14.6 (58.2)
Mean daily minimum °C (°F)	9.8 (49.6)	9.9 (49.8)	10.1 (50.2)	9.8 (49.6)	9.9 (49.8)	9.4 (48.9)	9.5 (49.1)	9.2 (48.6)	8.9 (48.0)	9.1 (48.4)	9.0 (48.2)	9.6 (49.3)	9.5 (49.1)
Average precipitation mm (inches)	500 (19.7)	445 (17.5)	530 (20.9)	466 (18.3)	507 (20.0)	546 (21.5)	544 (21.4)	480 (18.9)	438 (17.2)	516 (20.3)	445 (17.5)	482 (19.0)	5,899 (232.2)
Source: Climate-Data.org
