= Frieda River =

River in Papua New Guinea

- Location within Papua New Guinea

Location
- Country: Papua New Guinea
- Region: East Sepik Province

Physical characteristics
- Source
  - location: Papua New Guinea
- Mouth
  - coordinates: 4°19′03″S 142°00′18″E

The Frieda River is a river in northern Papua New Guinea.

== See also ==
- List of rivers of Papua New Guinea
- Frieda River languages
