= Papi language =

Sepik language of Papua New Guinea

Papi
- Baiyamo
- Native to: Papua New Guinea
- Region: East Sepik Province
- Native speakers: 220 (2011)
- Language family: Sepik: Leonhard Schultze; Papi–Asaba; Papi

Language codes
- ISO 639-3: ppe
- Glottolog: papi1255
- ELP: Papi
- Coordinates: 4.576892°S 141.961762°E

Papi (Paupe; also known Baiyamo) is an alleged Sepik language spoken in East Sepik Province, Papua New Guinea. Glottolog leaves it unclassified.

It is spoken in the single village of Paupe (4.576892°S 141.961762°E) in Tunap/Hunstein Rural LLG of East Sepik Province.
