= Pauwasi River =

River in Papua, Indonesia

- Location within Papua

Location
- Country: Indonesia
- Region: Papua

Physical characteristics
- Source
  - location: Indonesia
- Mouth
  - coordinates: 3°28′00″S 140°24′00″E

The Pauwasi River is a river in Western New Guinea.

== See also ==
- List of drainage basins of Indonesia
- List of rivers of Western New Guinea
- Pauwasi languages
- East Pauwasi languages
- West Pauwasi languages
- South Pauwasi languages
