= Pei language =

Sepik language of Papua New Guinea

Pei
- Native to: Papua New Guinea
- Region: East Sepik Province
- Native speakers: 200 (2012)
- Language family: Sepik: Leonhard Schultze; Walio; Pei

Language codes
- ISO 639-3: ppq
- Glottolog: peii1238
- ELP: Pei
- Coordinates: 4.33167°S 142.198514°E

Pei (Pai) is a nearly extinct Sepik language spoken in Ambunti Rural LLG, East Sepik Province, Papua-New Guinea. It is spoken in villages such as Hauna (4.33167°S 142.198514°E) of Ambunti Rural LLG.
