= Walio languages =

Sepik language family of Papua New Guinea

Walio
- Central Leonhard Schultze River
- Geographic distribution: Sepik River basin, Papua New Guinea
- Linguistic classification: Sepik: Leonhard Schultze; Walio
- Subdivisions: Walio; Pei; Yawiyo; Tuwari

Language codes
- Glottolog: wali1264

The Walio languages are a small family of clearly related languages,

Walio, Pei, Yawiyo, and Tuwari.

However, they are not close: Walio and Yawiyo have only a 12% lexical similarity. They are frequently classified among the Sepik languages of northern Papua New Guinea, though Glottolog leaves them out. Glottolog 3.4 classifies the Walio languages as an independent language family.
