= Suarmin language =

Sepik language spoken in Sandaun Province, Papua-New Guinea

Suarmin
- Asaba
- Native to: Papua New Guinea
- Region: Sandaun Province
- Native speakers: (140 cited 2000)
- Language family: Sepik: Leonhard Schultze; Papi–Asaba; Suarmin

Language codes
- ISO 639-3: seo
- Glottolog: suar1238
- ELP: Asaba
- Suarmin is classified as Definitely Endangered by the UNESCO Atlas of the World's Languages in Danger.

Suarmin, or Asaba, is a Sepik language spoken in Sandaun Province, Papua-New Guinea. Alternative names are Asabano, Duranmin.

Glottolog leaves it unclassified.

== Pronouns ==
Pronouns are:

| | sg | du | pl |
|---|---|---|---|
| 1incl | | adi | abe |
| 1excl | a | nadi | nesine |
| 2 | abo | abodua | apa |
| 3 | yo | atadua | ata |

== Noun classes ==
In Asaba, noun class affixes are suffixed to nouns. There are five noun classes. Examples:

| class | singular (ex.) | plural (ex.) | gloss (ex.) |
|---|---|---|---|
| class 1 | nu-bu | nu-le | house(s) |
| class 2 | mena-du | mena-no | pig(s) |
| class 3 | kabia-si | kabia-le | stone(s) |
| class 4 | moko-ni | moko-le | fork(s) |
| class 5 | nomo-so | nomo-l | stone adze(s) |

Class 1 is the default noun class.

Modifying adjectives agree with head nouns in class:

na-bu kamaya-bu
tree-I.SG big-I.SG
'tall tree'

kaiyebe-du kamaya-du
cassowary-II.SG big-II.SG
'big cassowary'
