= Molof language =

Unclassified language of Indonesia

Molof
- Poule
- Region: Papua: 9 villages located 100 km to the south of Jayapura; in Keerom Regency, Senggi District, Molof village
- Native speakers: 230 (2005)
- Language family: Unclassified, possibly Pauwasi or language isolate

Language codes
- ISO 639-3: msl
- Glottolog: molo1262
- ELP: Powle-Ma

Molof (Ampas, Poule, Powle-Ma) is a poorly documented Papuan language spoken by about 200 people in Molof village, Senggi District, Keerom Regency.

== Classification ==
Wurm (1975) placed it as an independent branch of Trans–New Guinea, but Ross (2005) could not find enough evidence to classify it. Søren Wichmann (2018) tentatively considers it to be a language isolate, as does Foley (2018). Usher (2020) tentatively suggests it may be a Pauwasi language.

== Phonology ==
Molof has a small consonant inventory, but a large one for vowels.

Molof consonants, quoted by Foley (2018) from Donohue (n.d.):

	Labial		Alveolar	Palatal	Velar	
	plain	labial	Alveolar	Palatal	plain	labial
Nasal	m		n		ŋ	
Plosive	p		t		k	kʷ
Fricative	f	fʷ	s			
Liquid			r			
Semivowel				j		w

Molof vowels (8 total), quoted by Foley (2018) from Donohue (n.d.):

	Front	Central	Back
Close	i		u
Close-mid	e	ə	o
Open-mid	ɛ	ə	ɔ
Open	a		

== Basic vocabulary ==
Basic vocabulary of Molof from Rumaropen (2005), quoted in Foley (2018):

Molof basic vocabulary
gloss	Molof
‘bird’	au
‘blood’	mɪt
‘bone’	antai
‘breast’	mu
‘ear’	ou
‘eat’	nɪ
‘egg’	li
‘eye’	lum
‘fire’	tombe
‘give’	tui
‘go’	tuɨ
‘ground’	aigiman
‘hair’	era
‘hear’	ar/arai
‘I’	məik
‘leg’	vu
‘louse’	əlim
‘man’	lomoa
‘moon’	ar
‘name’	ti
‘one’	kwasekak
‘road, path’	mɪtnine
‘see’	lokea
‘sky’	mejor
‘stone’	rɨ
‘sun’	neman
‘tongue’	aifoma
‘tooth’	tɨ
‘tree’	war
‘two’	atati
‘water’	yat
‘we’	ti
‘woman’	anar
‘you (sg)’	in

The following basic vocabulary words are from Voorhoeve (1971, 1975), as cited in the Trans-New Guinea database:

gloss	Molof
head	emi
hair	ela
ear	ou
eye	lom
nose	toŋga
tooth	te
tongue	ai
leg	fu
louse	lem
bird	au
egg	le
blood	mat
bone	antai
skin	kant
breast	mu
tree	woar
man	lomo
woman	anale
sun	nei
moon	ar
water	jat; yat
fire	tombe
stone	le
road, path	mef
name	ti
eat	ne
one	kwasekak
two	ateti
