= Øystein Lund Andersen =

Norwegian photographer and writer

- Born: 1981 (age 44–45); Bodø, Norway
- Occupation: Photographer
- Website: www.oysteinlundandersen.com

Øystein Lund Andersen is a Norwegian photographer and writer.

== Career ==
Andersen's most recognized work has been on volcanoes in Indonesia, where he has documented volcanic eruptions since 2008. His documentary photography and observations on volcanoes include Merapi, The Tengger Caldera, Tangkuban Perahu, Dieng Volcanic Complex and Anak Krakatau. On 22 December 2018, Andersen documented the volcanic-eruption of Anak Krakatau, that triggered the significant Sunda Strait tsunami. Following the event, his account has been a source for international news channels and scientific organizations. He is a co-author on a scientific paper on the 2018 Anak Krakatau eruption.

Andersen has written an ethnographic study on the Lepki people in Papua, Indonesia, released in 2007 and cultural descriptions on the people of Sentani and the Mek.
