= Indonesian Sign Language =

Sign language group of Indonesia

- Bahasa Isyarat Indonesia (BISINDO)
- Native to: Indonesia
- Signers: 810,000 (2021)
- Language family: French Sign: American Sign; Indonesian Sign Language
- Dialects: Jakarta Sign Language; Yogyakarta Sign Language; (presumably others)

Language codes
- ISO 639-3: inl
- Glottolog: indo1333

Indonesian Sign Language (Indonesian: Bahasa Isyarat Indonesia, BISINDO) is any of several related deaf sign languages of Indonesia, at least on the island of Java. It is based on American Sign Language, with local admixture in different cities. Although presented as a coherent language when advocating for recognition by the Indonesian government and use in education, the varieties used in different cities may not be mutually intelligible.

Specifically, the only study to have investigated this, Isma (2012), found that the sign languages of Jakarta and Yogyakarta are related but distinct languages, that they remain 65% lexically cognate but are grammatically distinct and apparently diverging. They are different enough that Isma's consultants in Hong Kong resorted to Hong Kong Sign Language to communicate with each other. Word order in Yogyakarta tends to be verb-final (SOV), whereas in Jakarta it tends to be verb-medial (SVO) when either noun phrase could be subject or object, and free otherwise. The varieties in other cities were not investigated.

Rather than sign language, education currently uses a form of manually-coded Indonesian known as Sistem Isyarat Bahasa Indonesia (SIBI).

== See also ==
- Kata Kolok, an unrelated language in Indonesia
