= Murkim language =

Language in Papua

Murkim
- Native to: Western New Guinea
- Region: Pegunungan Bintang Regency: Mofinop District (Milki and Mot villages) and Murkim District
- Native speakers: 290 (2004)
- Language family: Pauwasi: South Pauwasi; Lepki–Murkim; Murkim

Language codes
- ISO 639-3: rmh
- Glottolog: murk1238

Murkim is a Papuan language of Western New Guinea, near its relatives Lepki and Kembra. Though spoken by fewer than 300 people, it is being learned by children. It is spoken in Murkim District, Pegunungan Bintang Regency, Papua Province, Indonesia.

Dialects include the varieties spoken in Milki and Mot villages (Wambaliau 2004: 22-28).

== Pronouns ==
Pronouns are:

Murkim independent pronouns
	sg	pl
1excl	nuːk	nakme
1incl		nakmere
2	hak(o)	sakmere
3	kne ~ yak ~ ire	

== Sentences ==
Example sentences in Murkim:

iro-mo munɪ l-aba-le kne-lo
3-SBJ money ?-father-DAT? give-TNS
‘She gave money to my father.’

irom-mo abum har-ko
3-SBJ tomorrow go-TNS
‘She goes tomorrow.’

iro-mo yo tma-kon li-lo
3-SBJ wood machete-INSTR cut-TNS
‘He is cutting wood with a machete.’

iro-mo lais-if ɲi-lo
3-SBJ rice-? eat-TNS
‘Does she eat rice?’
