= Leonard Schultze River =

River in Papua New Guinea

Leonard Schultze River Leonhard Schultze River, Waria River
- Location within Papua New Guinea

Location
- Country: Papua New Guinea
- Region: East Sepik Province

Physical characteristics
- Source
  - location: Papua New Guinea
- Mouth
  - coordinates: 4°17′19″S 142°17′06″E

The Leonard Schultze River or Leonhard Schultze River is a river in northern Papua New Guinea. It is named after German explorer Leonhard Schultze-Jena.

== See also ==
- List of rivers of Papua New Guinea
- Leonard Schultze languages
