= Pauwasi languages =

Papuan language family

Pauwasi
- Pauwasi River
- Geographic distribution: Pauwasi River watershed, West New Guinea, Papua New Guinea
- Linguistic classification: One of the world's primary language families
- Subdivisions: East Pauwasi; West Pauwasi; South Pauwasi; ? Molof

Language codes
- Glottolog: pauw1244

The Pauwasi languages are a likely family of Papuan languages, mostly in Indonesia. The subfamilies are at best only distantly related. The best described Pauwasi language is Karkar, across the border in Papua New Guinea. They are spoken around the headwaters of the Pauwasi River in the Indonesian-PNG border region.

Based on earlier work, the East and West Pauwasi languages of Indonesia were classified together in Wurm (1975), though he (and later researchers) did not recognize that Yuri (Karkar) of Papua New Guinea was also East Pauwasi. That connection was made by Usher, though anthropologists had long known of the connection. Later the South Pauwasi languages were also identified by Usher, and the West Pauwasi family tentatively expanded. Wichmann (2013), Foley (2018) and Pawley & Hammarström (2018), noting the sharp differences among the three groups, are agnostic about whether West Pauwasi, East Pauwasi and South Pauwasi are related.

== Languages ==
- Pauwasi River
  - East
    - Emem–Karkar, Yafi (Zorop)
  - West
    - Dubu (Tebi), Towei
    - Namla–Tofanma
    - Usku (Afra)
  - Yetfa–South
    - Yetfa
    - South
      - Kimki
      - Lepki–Murkim: Lepki, Murkim, Kembra
  - ? Molof (Poule)

The inclusion of Molof (Poule) is especially tentative (as of 2020).

The languages are not close: though the Eastern languages are clearly related, Yafi and Emumu are only 25% lexically similar. Pawley and Hammarström (2018) also question whether Eastern Pauwasi and Western Pauwasi are really related. They also note that Tebi and Towei are very different from each other, and may not necessarily group with each other.

Karkar-Yuri, long thought to be an isolate in Papua New Guinea, is clearly related and may actually form a dialect continuum with Emumu in Indonesia. On the other hand, the Western languages are so poorly attested that it is not certain that they are part of the Pauwasi family (or even related to each other), or if the common words are loans and they constitute a separate family or families, though a family connection appears likely.

The proto-forms of the pronouns have not been reconstructed. Attested forms include:

		1sg	2sg	1pl	2pl
West	Dubu (Tebi)	no, nok	fo, fro	numu, nəmu	nimia, nəmia
West	Towei	ŋo, oŋgo	fo, u, ŋgo	nu	yu-
West	Afra (Usku)	o-, a-	po-, pu-	no	so
West	Namla	na	wuŋgiknoko	mani	yuka
West	Tofamna 1	ne	wo	incl ŋu excl nukwe	dule
West	Tofamna 2	niawi	wame	incl mlo excl wone	
East	Yafi (Zorop)	nam	nem, nəm, am	nin	nin-, nəm-
East	Emumu (Emem)	(w)ɔna(o)	mo, mao	ninao, nino	nimao, nəmou
East	Karkar	ɔnɔ	amɔ	yino, namo	yumo, yimung
South	Yetfa	nawo, nya(wo)	powo, pa	no(wo), nana	so, sef-
South	Kimki	win	(p)ume	name, nar	same
South	Murkim	nuːk	hak(o)	nakme(-re)	sakme-re
Molof (Poule)		məik, mai	in, ni	ti-PL (incl also inte)	in-PL

Yafi and Emumu are similar, and Dubu and Towei may share 1pl *numu, but there is no apparent connection between them. Dubu no and Yafi nam might reflect pTNG *na, and Towei ngo pTNG *ga (*nga), and the plural pTNG *nu and *ni.

== Classification ==
Stephen Wurm (1975) classified the Western (Indonesian) languages as a branch of the Trans–New Guinea (TNG) phylum, a position which Malcolm Ross (2005) tentatively retained. Ross's TNG classification is based on personal pronouns. Since no pronouns could be reconstructed from the available data on the poorly attested Indonesian Pauwasi languages, which were all that were recognized as Pauwasi at the time, only a tentative assessment could be made, based on a few lexical items. Some of the pronouns of Dubu and Yafi look like they might be TNG. However, Ross counted Karkar, for which the pronouns were known, as an isolate because its pronouns did not pattern as TNG. At this stage its identity as a Pauwasi language was unknown.

Pawley and Hammarström (2018) do not consider there to be sufficient evidence for the Pauwasi languages to be classified as part of Trans-New Guinea, though they do note the following lexical resemblances between Tebi, Yafi, and proto-Trans-New Guinea.

- Tebi ne ‘eat’ < *na-
- Tebi mi, Yafi yemar ‘louse’ < *iman, *niman

Foley (2018) notes that Western Pauwasi has more Trans-New Guinea lexical similarities than East Pauwasi does. He notes that Karkar-Yuri shares some typological similarities with the Trans-New Guinea languages, which could be due to chance, contact, or genetic inheritance.
