= Biksi-Yetfa language =

Pauwasi language spoken in Southeast Asia

Biksi-Yetfa
- Biksi
- Native to: Indonesia and Papua New Guinea
- Region: Jetfa District in Pegunungan Bintang Regency
- Ethnicity: Yetfa, Biksi
- Native speakers: (1,000 cited 1996)
- Language family: Pauwasi: South Pauwasi; Yetfa – South Pauwasi; Biksi-Yetfa
- Dialects: Yetfa; Biksi
- Writing system: Latin script

Language codes
- ISO 639-3: yet
- Glottolog: yetf1238
- ELP: Yetfa-Biksi

Yetfa and Biksi (Biaksi; Inisine) are dialects of a language spoken in Jetfa District, Pegunungan Bintang Regency, Highland Papua, Indonesia, and across the border in Papua New Guinea. It is a trade language spoken in Western New Guinea up to the PNG border.

According to Hammarström (2008), it is being passed on to children and is not in immediate danger.

== External relationships ==
Yetfa is not close to other languages. Ross (2005), following Laycock & Z’Graggen (1975), places Biksi in its own branch of the Sepik family, but there is little data to base a classification on. The similarities noted by Laycock are sporadic and may simply be loans; Ross based his classification on pronouns, but they are dissimilar enough for the connection to be uncertain. Usher found it to be a Southern Pauwasi language. Foley (2018) classifies it as a language isolate.

Foley (2018b: 295-296) notes that first person pronoun and third-person singular masculine pronoun in Yetfa match pronouns found in Sepik languages, with some resemblances such as nim ‘louse’ with proto-Sepik *nim ‘louse’, and wal ‘ear’ with proto-Sepik *wan. However, Foley (2018b) considers the evidence linking Yetfa to the Sepik family to be insufficient, thus classifying Yetfa as a language isolate until further evidence can be found.

== Pronouns ==
Pronouns from Ross (2005):

I	nyo	we	nana
thou	pwo	you	so
s/he	do	they	dwa

Pronouns from Kim (2005), as quoted in Foley (2018):

Yetfa independent pronouns
	sg	pl
1	na	no
2	po	so-na-m
3	do	do-na-ma

== Basic vocabulary ==
Basic vocabulary of Yetfa from Kim (2006), quoted in Foley (2018):

Yetfa basic vocabulary
gloss	Yetfa
‘bird’	dau
‘blood’	dueal
‘bone’	fan
‘breast’	nom
‘ear’	wal
‘eat’	ɲa
‘egg’	nela
‘eye’	i
‘fire’	yao
‘give’	ni-
‘go’	la-
‘ground’	permai
‘hair’	framai
‘hear’	wi-
‘I’	na(wo)
‘leg’	yop
‘louse’	nim
‘man’	nam
‘moon’	dirmanel
‘name’	met
‘one’	kəsa
‘road, path’	mla
‘see’	am-
‘sky’	aklai
‘stone’	tekop
‘sun’	imenel
‘tongue’	mor
‘tooth’	doa
‘tree’	yo
‘two’	daisil
‘water’	ket
‘we’	no(wo)
‘woman’	romo
‘you (sg)’	po(wo)
‘you (pl)’	sonam

The following basic vocabulary words are from Conrad & Dye (1975) and Voorhoeve (1975), as cited in the Trans-New Guinea database:

gloss	Yetfa
head	fran; ᵽr᷈an
hair	fra may; ᵽʌřamai
eye	i; ʔiʔ
nose	ndor
tooth	ɔřa; rwa
tongue	moR᷈
louse	ni:m; yim
dog	say
pig	mbaR᷈; mualə
bird	rawi
egg	řonǏa
blood	ndwal
bone	fan
skin	tol; toR᷈
tree	yau; yo; yɔ
man	nam
woman	namiyaA
sun	məlel
water	kel; kɛr᷈
fire	yaʋ; yau
stone	təkoup; tɩkɔᵽ
road, path	miaA
eat	ŋa; ntɛřᵽI
one	kəsa; kɛsa
two	ndyesel; tesyɛnsaR᷈

== Sentences ==
There is very little sentence data for Yetfa. Some of the few documented Yetfa sentences are:

do mete ti-yo
3SG yesterday come-TNS
‘She came yesterday’

do muni ɲ(a)-awa-te ni-yo
3SG money 1SG-father-DAT? give-TNS
‘She gave money to my father.’

The Yetfa tense suffix -(y)o is also present in Tofanma.
