= Kembra language =

South Pauwasi language of Indonesia

Kembra
- Native to: Western New Guinea
- Region: Kiambra village, Kaisenar District, Keerom Regency
- Ethnicity: 50
- Native speakers: (20 cited 2000)
- Language family: Pauwasi: South; Lepki–Murkim; Kembra

Language codes
- ISO 639-3: xkw
- Glottolog: kemb1250
- ELP: Kembra
- Kembra is classified as Critically Endangered by the UNESCO Atlas of the World's Languages in Danger.

Kembra is a South Pauwasi language spoken in Western New Guinea by some twenty persons in Kiambra village, Kaisenar District, Keerom Regency. It is used by 20–60% of the ethnic population and is no longer passed down to children.

== Classification ==
Initial documentation was carried out by Barnabas Konel and Roger Doriot. Kembra data remains unpublished in Konel's and Doriot's field notes.

Foley (2018) notes that Kembra has some lexical forms resembling Lepki, but not Murkim, hinting at lexical borrowing between Kembra and Lepki, but not Murkim. He allows the possibility of Kembra being related to Lepki–Murkim, pending further evidence. With more data, Usher (2020) was able to verify the connection.

== Phonology ==
Kembra is a tonal language, as shown by the following minimal pair.

- yá 'pig'
- yà 'fire, tree'

== Basic vocabulary ==
Basic vocabulary of Kembra listed in Foley (2018):

Kembra basic vocabulary
| gloss | Kembra |
|---|---|
| 'bird' | tra |
| 'blood' | nili |
| 'bone' | ka |
| 'eat' | ɲəm |
| 'egg' | traləl |
| 'eye' | yi |
| 'fire' | ya |
| 'give' | lokwes |
| 'ground' | to |
| 'hair' | iyet |
| 'I' | mu |
| 'leg' | kla |
| 'louse' | nim |
| 'man' | ratera |
| 'name' | kia |
| 'one' | kutina |
| 'see' | iyam |
| 'stone' | isi |
| 'sun' | ota |
| 'tooth' | pa |
| 'tree' | ya |
| 'two' | kais |
| 'water' | er |
| 'we' | utuas |
| 'you (sg)' | amagrei |
| 'you (pl)' | robkei |

== Sentences ==
Kembra has SOV word order, and also appears to have bipartite negation as in Abun and French. Only several sentences have been elicited by Konel (n.d.), which are quoted below from Foley (2018).

pei yá por ɲəm
dog pig black eat
'The dog ate the black pig.'

mu ipei ɲəm
1SG betelnut eat
'I'm chewing betelnut.'

mu pei te-iya-mo
1SG dog ?-see-TNS
'I see the dog.'

mu ipei abi-ɲi koto
1SG betelnut NEG-eat NEG
'I didn't eat betelnut.'

mu pei abi-(i)ya koto
1SG dog NEG-see NEG
'I didn't see the dog.'
