= William A. Foley =

American linguist (born 1949)

William A. Foley FAHA
- Born: William Auguste Foley; 1949 (age 76–77)
- Occupation: Linguist

Academic background
- Education: Brown University (BA); University of California, Berkeley (MA, PhD)
- Thesis: Comparative Syntax in Austronesian (1976)
- Doctoral advisor: Charles J. Fillmore

Academic work
- Institutions: Columbia University, University of Sydney
- Main interests: Papuan languages and Neurolinguistics
- Notable works: The Papuan Languages of New Guinea (1986)
- Notable ideas: Role and reference grammar

William A. Foley FAHA (William Auguste "Bill" Foley; born 1949) is an American linguist and professor at Columbia University. He previously worked at the University of Sydney, where he is a Professor Emeritus. He specializes in Papuan and Austronesian languages. Foley developed Role and Reference Grammar in a partnership with Robert Van Valin.

== Education ==
Foley attended Brown University and received his B.A. in 1971. He then completed his M.A. and Ph.D. in Linguistics at the University of California, Berkeley, where he studied Austronesian languages.

== Career ==
In 1986, Foley published The Papuan Languages of New Guinea through Cambridge University Press. In 1991, his book The Yimas Language of New Guinea was published by Stanford University Press. In 1997, his book Anthropological Linguistics, "the first comprehensive textbook in anthropological linguistics" was published with an introduction by Noam Chomsky.

Foley was elected a Fellow of the Australian Academy of the Humanities in 1989.

== Works ==
- Foley, William A. (1976). Comparative Syntax in Austronesian. University of California, Berkeley doctoral thesis. Retrieved from https://escholarship.org/uc/item/9cw8s190.
- Foley, William A. and Robert D. Van Valin, Jr (1984). Functional syntax and universal grammar. Cambridge: Cambridge University Press.
- Foley, William A. (1986). The Papuan Languages of New Guinea. Cambridge: Cambridge University Press. ISBN 0-521-28621-2. Google Books
- Foley, William A. (1991). The Yimas Language of New Guinea. Stanford: Stanford University Press. ISBN 0-8047-1582-3
- Foley, William A. (1997). Anthropological Linguistics: an introduction. Oxford: Basil Blackwell.
- Foley, William A. (2005). "Linguistic prehistory in the Sepik - Ramu basin." In: Andrew Pawley, Robert Attenborough, Robin Hide and Jack Golson, eds, Papuan pasts: cultural, linguistic and biological histories of Papuan-speaking peoples, 109–144. Canberra: Pacific Linguistics.
- Foley, William A. (2018). "The Languages of the Sepik-Ramu Basin and Environs". In Palmer, Bill (ed.). The Languages and Linguistics of the New Guinea Area: A Comprehensive Guide. The World of Linguistics. Vol. 4. Berlin: De Gruyter Mouton. pp. 197–432. ISBN 978-3-11-028642-7.
- Foley, William A. (2018). "The languages of Northwest New Guinea". In Palmer, Bill (ed.). The Languages and Linguistics of the New Guinea Area: A Comprehensive Guide. The World of Linguistics. Vol. 4. Berlin: De Gruyter Mouton. pp. 433–568. ISBN 978-3-11-028642-7.
- Foley, William A. (2022). "A Sketch Grammar of Kopar". Berlin: De Gruyter Mouton
