= Bintang Mountains Regency =

Regency in Highland Papua, Indonesia

Bintang Mountains Regency Kabupaten Pegunungan Bintang
- Regency
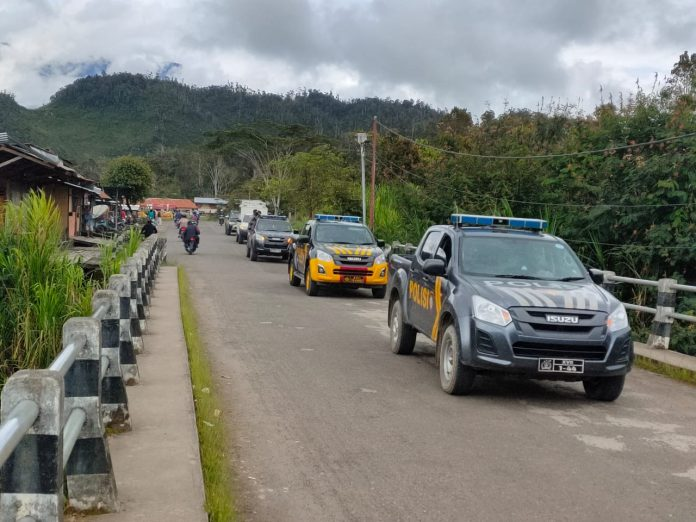
- A road in Oksibil, Pegunungan Bintang Regency

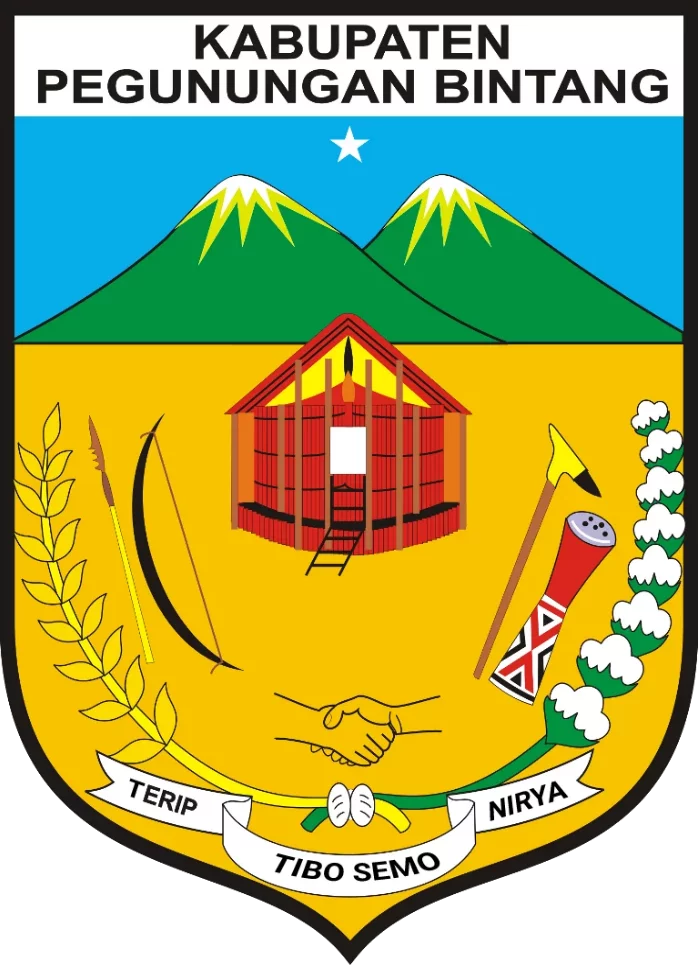
- Coat of arms
- Motto: Terip Tibo Semo Nirya (Let's Rise to Build Together)
- Location in Highland Papua

- Location in Indonesian Papua Location in Indonesia
- Coordinates: 4.5217°S 140.2954°E
- Country: Indonesia
- Province: Highland Papua
- Seat: Oksibil

Government
  - Regent: Spei Yan Bidana
  - Vice Regent: Arnold Nam

Area
  - Total: 15,683 km^{2} (6,055 sq mi)

Population (mid 2024 estimate)
  - Total: 114,581
  - Density: 7.3061/km^{2} (18.923/sq mi)
- Time zone: UTC+9 (Indonesia Eastern Time)
- Area code: (+62) 975
- Website: pegbintangkab.go.id

Pegunungan Bintang Regency or Bintang Mountains Regency ("Bintang" means "star") is a regency in the Indonesian province of Highland Papua. It was created on 11 December 2002 from the north-eastern districts of Jayawijaya Regency. It covers an area of 15,683 km^{2}, and had a population of 65,434 at the 2010 Census and 77,872 at the 2020 Census; the official estimate as of mid-2024 was 114,581 – comprising 61,112 males and 53,469 females. The administrative centre is the town of Oksibil.

== Name ==
Pegunungan Bintang is the Indonesian name for the Star Mountains, a mountain range that is also shared by Papua New Guinea. Similarly, Star Mountains Rural LLG in Western Province, Papua New Guinea is also named after the same mountain range.

== Geography ==
Pegunungan Bintang Regency, located in Papua Pegunungan Province, Indonesia, has very distinctive geographical characteristics and is influenced by mountainous topography. This regency is part of the Maoke Mountains that stretch across the Papua region, so that most of its territory consists of mountainous areas with high peaks and deep valleys. This topography makes the Pegunungan Bintang area have rich biodiversity, thanks to the dense tropical forests that cover most of its territory. The tropical rainforests in this area not only function as ecosystem buffers but also as providers of natural resources. In addition, Pegunungan Bintang Regency has a number of rivers, especially the Digoel River and lakes, most of which flow south towards the Arafura Sea.The rivers in this area tend to have a fast flow due to the steep slopes of the mountains. The climate in this area is a tropical climate with relatively stable temperatures throughout the year and high rainfall, which supports the growth of lush vegetation. The mountainous and difficult-to-reach geographical conditions affect the transportation infrastructure in this regency, which is generally limited. Roads often become inaccessible during the rainy season, so air transportation is one of the main options for connecting this area to other regions. These overall geographical conditions influence various aspects of life in the Bintang Mountains, including the economy, infrastructure and way of life of the local people.

=== Border Area ===
Astronomically, Pegunungan Bintang Regency is located between 3°04'00” – 5°20'00” South Latitude and 140°05'00” – 141°00'00” East Longitude. While geographically, Pegunungan Bintang Regency borders Keerom Regency and Jayapura Regency to the north, Boven Digoel Regency to the south, Yahukimo Regency to the west and Papua New Guinea to the east.

== Languages ==
The Yetfa and Murkim languages are spoken in the eponymous Jetfa and Murkim districts. Other indigenous Papuan languages of Pegunungan Bintang Regency are Lepki (Lepki-Murkim family), Kimki (isolate), Towei (Pauwasi), Emem (Pauwasi), and Burumakok (Ok, Trans-New Guinea).

== Administrative districts ==
The Bintang Mountains Regency comprises thirty-four districts (distrik), tabulated below with their current areas and their populations within those current areas at the 2010 Census and 2020 Census, together with the official estimates as of mid-2024. The table also includes the locations of the district administrative centres, the number of administrative villages (kampung) in each district, and its post code.

Kode Wilayah	Name of District (distrik)	Area in km^{2}	Pop'n 2010 Census	Pop'n 2020 Census	Pop'n mid 2024 Estimate	Admin centre	No. of villages	Post code
95.02.04	**Iwur**	833	2,279	1,530	3,882	Iwur	10	99432
95.02.17	Kawor	835	1,084	794	3,623	Arintap	7	99433
95.02.19	Tarup	470	1,235	1,134	3,064	Tarup	7	99434
95.02.18	Awinbon	872	517	729	1,177	Awinbon	5	99431
95.02.01	**Oksibil**	248	4,087	6,408	6,949	Mabilabol	8	99415
95.02.09	Pepera	196	1,173	1,560	2,756	Pepera	7	99417
95.02.11	Alemsom	476	2,021	3,067	4,342	Alemsom	12	99411
95.02.15	Serambakon	265	1,935	3,896	3,166	Wanbakon	8	99418
95.02.13	Kalomdol	124	1,185	2,025	2,505	Dabolding	5	99412
95.02.14	Oksop	317	1,948	2,167	3,367	Oksop	5	99416
95.02.24	Oksebang	22	611	674	1,163	Kubiphkop	4	99427
95.02.12	Okbape	246	799	1,210	3,028	Bape	6	99414
95.02.16	Ok Aom	133	1,222	1,305	2,101	Bulankop	6	99413
95.02.06	**Borme**	602	2,845	5,920	7,450	Borme	13	99452
95.02.10	Bime	726	3,922	6,913	6,924	Turwe	10	99451
95.02.32	Eipumek	306	4,071	2,069	5,004	Eipumek	14	99453
95.02.27	Weime	261	2,529	1,340	3,224	Weime	9	99446
95.02.33	Pamek	204	1,876	1,430	3,999	Pamek	11	99454
95.02.34	Nongme	526	2,042	1,020	1,588	Nongme	7	99445
95.02.26	Batani	833	1,401	1,326	2,041	Batani	7	99441
95.02.03	**Okbibab**	237	1,918	3,644	3,723	Abmisibil	12	99403
95.02.08	Aboy	1,054	975	1,176	3,053	Aboy	7	99401
95.02.25	Okbab	617	3,390	4,213	7,685	Borban	12	99403
95.02.31	Teiraplu	1,469	1,356	2,019	2,430	Teiraplu	10	99405
95.02.30	Jetfa	330	611	865	2,401	Yefta	6	99402
95.02.02	**Kiwirok**	254	2,679	3,020	3,988	Polobakon	12	99421
95.02.07	Kiwirok Timur (East Kiwirok)	404	1,942	2,431	3,239	Okyop	9	99422
95.02.20	Okhika	91	1,318	1,690	2,335	Okelwel	4	99424
95.02.22	Oklip	46	1,640	2,113	2,234	Oklip	7	99425
95.02.21	Oksamol	267	2,322	2,736	3,139	Tinibil	12	99426
95.02.05	**Batom**	476	4,144	4,047	3,785	Batom	11	99442
95.02.28	Murkim	359	675	810	1,263	Bias	4	99444
95.02.29	Mofinop	811	1,128	1,012	1,516	Mot	5	99443
95.02.23	Okbemtau	769	2,554	1,578	2,437	Okngam	9	99423
	Totals	15,683	65,434	77,872	114,581	Oksibil	277	

The number of districts increased dramatically prior to 2010, created by the division of the six original districts (whose names are given in bold above and are numbered from 95.02.01 to 95.02.06). The 28 new districts (numbered from 95.02.07 to 95.02.34) are shown as follows:

- Kawor, Tarup, and Awinbon were created from parts of Iwur District
- Pepera, Alemsom, Serambakon, Kolomdol, Oksop, Ok Sebang (formerly Sebang), Ok Bape, and Ok Aon were created from parts of Oksibil District
- Bime, Epumek, Weime, Pamek, Nongme, and Batani were created from parts of Borme District
- Aboy, Okbab, Teiraplu, and Yefta were created from parts of Okbi District
- East Kiwirok, Okhika, Oklip, and Oksamol (formerly Warasamo) were created from parts of Kiwirok District
- Murkim, Mofinop, and Okbemta were created from parts of Batom District

Note that while the Regency's official number is 95.02, the document printed for 28 February 2025 bears the (incorrect) reference of "94.17".

== See also ==
- Star Mountains
