= Glottolog =

Online bibliographic database of languages

- Producer: Max Planck Institute of Geoanthropology (Germany)
- Languages: English

Access
- Cost: Free

Coverage
- Disciplines: Linguistics

Links
- Website: glottolog.org

Glottolog is an open-access online bibliographic database of the world's languages. In addition to listing linguistic materials (grammars, articles, dictionaries) describing individual languages, the database also contains the most up-to-date language affiliations based on the work of expert linguists.

Glottolog was first developed and maintained at the Max Planck Institute for Evolutionary Anthropology in Leipzig, Germany, and between 2015 and 2020 at the Max Planck Institute of Geoanthropology in Jena, Germany. Its main curators include Harald Hammarström and Martin Haspelmath.

== Overview ==
Sebastian Nordhoff and Harald Hammarström established the Glottolog/Langdoc project in 2011. The creation of Glottolog was partly motivated by the lack of a comprehensive language bibliography, especially in Ethnologue.

Glottolog provides a catalogue of the world's languages and language families and a bibliography on individual languages. It differs from Ethnologue in several respects:

- It includes only those languages that the editors have been able to confirm both exist and are distinct. Varieties that have not been confirmed, but are inherited from another source, are tagged as "spurious" or "unattested". (Note: See for example the bookkeeping section for ISO languages that Glottolog has deemed to be spurious distinctions. This discrimination does not apply to dialects, many of which have been inherited from MultiTree or other sources without verification.)
- It attempts only to classify languages into families demonstrated to be valid groupings based on research by linguists specializing in them.
- Comprehensive bibliographic information is provided, especially for lesser-known or underdescribed languages.
- To a limited extent, alternative names are listed according to the sources that use them.
- Apart from a single point-location on a map at its geographic centre, no ethnographic or demographic information is provided.

Language names used in the bibliographic entries are identified by ISO 639-3 code or Glottolog's own code (Glottocode). External links are provided to ISO, Ethnologue and other online language databases

The latest version is 5.4, released under the Creative Commons Attribution 4.0 International License in November 2026.

It is part of the Cross-Linguistic Linked Data project hosted by the Max Planck Institute of Geoanthropology.

== Language families ==
Glottolog is more conservative in its classification than other databases in establishing membership of languages and families given its strict criteria for postulating larger groupings. On the other hand, the database is more permissive in terms of considering unclassified languages as isolates. Edition 4.8 lists 421 spoken language (Note: Sign languages are listed together, including those grouped typologically as village sign languages, as are pidgins and unclassified languages, but without a claim that they are necessarily related.) families and isolates as follows:

List of Glottolog genealogical families
Name	Region (Note: Geographic regions include "Papunesia" (a portmanteau of Papua (New Guinea) and Austronesia), which refers to the islands of Insular Southeast Asia and Oceania, excluding Australia. Here it is replaced with 'Oceania'.)	Languages
Atlantic-Congo	Africa	1,410
Austronesian	Africa, Eurasia, Oceania, South America	1,272
Indo-European	Africa, Australia, Eurasia, North America, Oceania, South America	585
Sino-Tibetan	Eurasia	506
Afro-Asiatic	Africa, Eurasia	382
Nuclear Trans New Guinea	Oceania	317
Pama-Nyungan	Australia, Oceania	250
Otomanguean	North America	181
Austroasiatic	Eurasia	158
Tai-Kadai	Eurasia	96
Dravidian	Eurasia	82
Arawakan	North America, South America	77
Mande	Africa	75
Tupian	South America	70
Uto-Aztecan	North America	68
Central Sudanic	Africa	63
Nilotic	Africa	56
Nuclear Torricelli	Oceania	55
Uralic	Eurasia	49
Algic	North America	47
Athabaskan-Eyak-Tlingit	North America	46
Pano-Tacanan	South America	45
Quechuan	South America	43
Turkic	Eurasia	43
Cariban	South America	42
Hmong-Mien	Eurasia	42
Kru	Africa	38
Nakh-Daghestanian	Eurasia	36
Sepik	Oceania	36
Mayan	North America	34
Lower Sepik-Ramu	Oceania	30
Nuclear-Macro-Je	South America	29
Chibchan	North America, South America	27
Tucanoan	South America	26
Salishan	North America	25
Timor-Alor-Pantar	Oceania	23
Dogon	Africa	20
Lakes Plain	Oceania	20
Mixe-Zoque	North America	19
Ta-Ne-Omotic	Africa	19
Yam	Oceania	19
Siouan	North America	18
Anim	Oceania	17
Japonic	Eurasia, Oceania	17
Mongolic-Khitan	Eurasia	17
Border	Oceania	15
North Halmahera	Oceania	15
Tungusic	Eurasia	15
Khoe-Kwadi	Africa	14
Angan	Oceania	13
Eskimo-Aleut	Eurasia, North America	13
Miwok-Costanoan	North America	13
Ndu	Oceania	13
Nubian	Africa	13
Tor-Orya	Oceania	13
Totonacan	North America	13
Chapacuran	South America	12
Gunwinyguan	Australia	12
Cochimi-Yuman	North America	11
Iroquoian	North America	11
Sko	Oceania	11
Surmic	Africa	11
Western Daly	Australia	11
Geelvink Bay	Oceania	10
Great Andamanese	Eurasia, Oceania	10
Heibanic	Africa	10
Ijoid	Africa	10
Maban	Africa	10
Nyulnyulan	Australia	10
Saharan	Africa	10
Songhay	Africa	10
South Bougainville	Oceania	10
Worrorran	Australia	10
Chocoan	South America	9
Dagan	Oceania	9
Tuu	Africa	9
Greater Kwerba	Oceania	8
Kiowa-Tanoan	North America	8
Koiarian	Oceania	8
Mailuan	Oceania	8
Narrow Talodi	Africa	8
Bosavi	Oceania	7
Chukotko-Kamchatkan	Eurasia	7
Dajuic	Africa	7
Huitotoan	South America	7
Matacoan	South America	7
Muskogean	North America	7
Pomoan	North America	7
Arawan	South America	6
Baining	Oceania	6
Barbacoan	South America	6
Chumashan	North America	6
East Strickland	Oceania	6
Kadugli-Krongo	Africa	6
Kiwaian	Oceania	6
Left May	Oceania	6
Lengua-Mascoy	South America	6
Nambiquaran	South America	6
South Bird's Head Family	Oceania	6
Wakashan	North America	6
Yanomamic	South America	6
Zaparoan	South America	6
Abkhaz-Adyge	Eurasia	5
Arafundi	Oceania	5
Caddoan	North America	5
Eleman	Oceania	5
Guahiboan	South America	5
Guaicuruan	South America	5
Kartvelian	Eurasia	5
Keram	Oceania	5
Koman	Africa	5
Kxa	Africa	5
Mirndi	Australia	5
Misumalpan	North America	5
Nimboranic	Oceania	5
Pauwasi	Oceania	5
Sahaptian	North America	5
South Omotic	Africa	5
West Bird's Head	Oceania	5
Xincan	North America	5
Yareban	Oceania	5
Yeniseian	Eurasia	5
Yuat	Oceania	5
Aymaran	South America	4
Blue Nile Mao	Africa	4
Chicham	South America	4
Chinookan	North America	4
Chonan	South America	4
Eastern Jebel	Africa	4
Eastern Trans-Fly	Oceania	4
Huavean	North America	4
Iwaidjan Proper	Australia	4
Kamakanan	South America	4
Kunimaipan	Oceania	4
Maiduan	North America	4
Mangarrayi-Maran	Australia	4
Maningrida	Australia	4
Naduhup	South America	4
North Bougainville	Oceania	4
Sentanic	Oceania	4
Shastan	North America	4
Suki-Gogodala	Oceania	4
Tamaic	Africa	4
Tangkic	Australia	4
Turama-Kikori	Oceania	4
Walioic	Oceania	4
Yokutsan	North America	4
Yukaghir	Eurasia	4
Ainu	Eurasia	3
Bororoan	South America	3
Bulaka River	Oceania	3
Charruan	South America	3
Dizoid	Africa	3
East Bird's Head	Oceania	3
Giimbiyu	Australia	3
Gumuz	Africa	3
Jarrakan	Australia	3
Kalapuyan	North America	3
Kamula-Elevala	Oceania	3
Katla-Tima	Africa	3
Kawesqar	South America	3
Kayagaric	Oceania	3
Kolopom	Oceania	3
Kresh-Aja	Africa	3
Kuliak	Africa	3
Kwalean	Oceania	3
Lepki-Murkim-Kembra	Oceania	3
Mairasic	Oceania	3
Peba-Yagua	South America	3
Saliban	South America	3
Tequistlatecan	North America	3
Tsimshian	North America	3
West Bomberai	Oceania	3
Western Tasmanian	Australia	3
Yangmanic	Australia	3
Zamucoan	South America	3
Amto-Musan	Oceania	2
Araucanian	South America	2
Baibai-Fas	Oceania	2
Bayono-Awbono	Oceania	2
Bogia	Oceania	2
Boran	South America	2
Bunaban	Australia	2
Cahuapanan	South America	2
Chimakuan	North America	2
Chiquitano	South America	2
Coosan	North America	2
Doso-Turumsa	Oceania	2
East Kutubu	Oceania	2
Eastern Daly	Australia	2
Furan	Africa	2
Garrwan	Australia	2
Haida	North America	2
Harakmbut	South America	2
Hatam-Mansim	Oceania	2
Hibito-Cholon	South America	2
Huarpean	South America	2
Hurro-Urartian	Eurasia	2
Inanwatan	Oceania	2
Jarawa-Onge	Eurasia	2
Jicaquean	North America	2
Kakua-Nukak	South America	2
Katukinan	South America	2
Kaure-Kosare	Oceania	2
Keresan	North America	2
Konda-Yahadian	Oceania	2
Koreanic	Eurasia	2
Kwomtari-Nai	Oceania	2
Lencan	North America	2
Limilngan-Wulna	Australia	2
Manubaran	Oceania	2
Marrku-Wurrugu	Australia	2
Mombum-Koneraw	Oceania	2
Namla-Tofanma	Oceania	2
Nivkh	Eurasia	2
North-Eastern Tasmanian	Australia	2
Northern Daly	Australia	2
Nyimang	Africa	2
Otomaco-Taparita	South America	2
Pahoturi	Oceania	2
Palaihnihan	North America	2
Piawi	Oceania	2
Puri-Coroado	South America	2
Rashad	Africa	2
Senagi	Oceania	2
Somahai	Oceania	2
South-Eastern Tasmanian	Australia	2
Southern Daly	Australia	2
Tarascan	North America	2
Taulil-Butam	Oceania	2
Teberan	Oceania	2
Temeinic	Africa	2
Ticuna-Yuri	South America	2
Uru-Chipaya	South America	2
Wintuan	North America	2
Yawa-Saweru	Oceania	2
Yuki-Wappo	North America	2
Abinomn	Oceania	1
Abun	Oceania	1
Adai	North America	1
Aewa	South America	1
Aikanã	South America	1
Alsea-Yaquina	North America	1
Andaqui	South America	1
Andoque	South America	1
Anem	Oceania	1
Arutani	South America	1
Asabano	Oceania	1
Atacame	South America	1
Atakapa	North America	1
Bangime	Africa	1
Basque	Eurasia	1
Beothuk	North America	1
Berta	Africa	1
Betoi-Jirara	South America	1
Bilua	Oceania	1
Bogaya	Oceania	1
Burmeso	Oceania	1
Burushaski	Eurasia	1
Camsá	South America	1
Candoshi-Shapra	South America	1
Canichana	South America	1
Cayubaba	South America	1
Cayuse	North America	1
Chimariko	North America	1
Chitimacha	North America	1
Chono	South America	1
Coahuilteco	North America	1
Cofán	South America	1
Comecrudan	North America	1
Cotoname	North America	1
Cuitlatec	North America	1
Culli	South America	1
Damal	Oceania	1
Dem	Oceania	1
Dibiyaso	Oceania	1
Duna	Oceania	1
Elamite	Eurasia	1
Elseng	Oceania	1
Esselen	North America	1
Etruscan	Eurasia	1
Fasu	Oceania	1
Fulniô	South America	1
Fuyug	Oceania	1
Gaagudju	Australia	1
Guachi	South America	1
Guaicurian	North America	1
Guamo	South America	1
Guató	South America	1
Gule	Africa	1
Guriaso	Oceania	1
Hadza	Africa	1
Hattic	Eurasia	1
Hoti	South America	1
Hruso	Eurasia	1
Iberian	Eurasia	1
Irántxe-Münkü	South America	1
Itonama	South America	1
Jalaa	Africa	1
Jirajaran	South America	1
Kaki Ae	Oceania	1
Kanoê	South America	1
Kapori	Oceania	1
Karami	Oceania	1
Karankawa	North America	1
Kariri	South America	1
Karok	North America	1
Kehu	Oceania	1
Kenaboi	Eurasia	1
Kibiri	Oceania	1
Kimki	Oceania	1
Klamath-Modoc	North America	1
Kol (Papua New Guinea)	Oceania	1
Kujarge	Africa	1
Kunama	Africa	1
Kungarakany	Australia	1
Kunza	South America	1
Kuot	Oceania	1
Kusunda	Eurasia	1
Kutenai	North America	1
Kwaza	South America	1
Laal	Africa	1
Lafofa	Africa	1
Laragia	Australia	1
Lavukaleve	Oceania	1
Leco	South America	1
Lule	South America	1
Máku	South America	1
Maratino	North America	1
Marori	Oceania	1
Massep	Oceania	1
Matanawí	South America	1
Mato Grosso Arára	South America	1
Mawes	Oceania	1
Maybrat-Karon	Oceania	1
Meroitic	Africa	1
Mimi-Gaudefroy	Africa	1
Minkin	Australia	1
Mochica	South America	1
Molale	North America	1
Molof	Oceania	1
Mor (Bomberai Peninsula)	Oceania	1
Mosetén-Chimané	South America	1
Movima	South America	1
Mpur	Oceania	1
Muniche	South America	1
Mure	South America	1
Nara	Africa	1
Natchez	North America	1
Nihali	Eurasia	1
Odiai	Oceania	1
Omurano	South America	1
Ongota	Africa	1
Oti	South America	1
Oyster Bay-Big River-Little Swanport	Australia	1
Páez	South America	1
Pankararú	South America	1
Papi	Oceania	1
Pawaia	Oceania	1
Payagua	South America	1
Pele-Ata	Oceania	1
Pirahã	South America	1
Puelche	South America	1
Puinave	South America	1
Pumé	South America	1
Puquina	South America	1
Purari	Oceania	1
Pyu	Oceania	1
Ramanos	South America	1
Salinan	North America	1
Sandawe	Africa	1
Sapé	South America	1
Sause	Oceania	1
Savosavo	Oceania	1
Sechuran	South America	1
Seri	North America	1
Shabo	Africa	1
Shom Peng	Eurasia	1
Siamou	Africa	1
Siuslaw	North America	1
Sulka	Oceania	1
Sumerian	Eurasia	1
Tabo	Oceania	1
Taiap	Oceania	1
Takelma	North America	1
Tallán	South America	1
Tambora	Oceania	1
Tanahmerah	Oceania	1
Taruma	South America	1
Tauade	Oceania	1
Taushiro	South America	1
Timote-Cuica	South America	1
Timucua	North America	1
Tinigua	South America	1
Tiwi	Australia	1
Tonkawa	North America	1
Touo	Oceania	1
Trumai	South America	1
Tunica	North America	1
Tuxá	South America	1
Umbugarla	Australia	1
Urarina	South America	1
Usku	Oceania	1
Vilela	South America	1
Wadjiginy	Australia	1
Wageman	Australia	1
Waorani	South America	1
Warao	South America	1
Washo	North America	1
Wiru	Oceania	1
Xukurú	South America	1
Yale	Oceania	1
Yámana	South America	1
Yana	North America	1
Yele	Oceania	1
Yerakai	Oceania	1
Yetfa	Oceania	1
Yuchi	North America	1
Yuracaré	South America	1
Yurumanguí	South America	1
Zuni	North America	1

Creoles are classified with the language that supplied their basic lexicon.

In addition to the families and isolates listed above, Glottolog uses several non-genealogical families for various languages:

- Pidgins (84 languages)
- Mixed languages (9)
- Artificial languages (31)
- Speech registers (15)
- Sign languages (223)
- Unclassifiable attested languages (121)
- Unattested languages (68)
- Bookkeeping: spurious languages, such as retired ISO entries; kept for bookkeeping purposes (390 including 6 sign languages)
