= Grammatical number =

Use of grammar in a language to express number

In linguistics, grammatical number is a feature, in many languages, of nouns, pronouns, adjectives and verb agreement that expresses count distinctions (such as "one", "two" or "three or more"). English and many other languages present number categories of singular or plural. Some languages also have a dual, trial and paucal number or other arrangements.

The word "number" is also used in linguistics to describe the distinction between certain grammatical aspects that indicate the number of times an event occurs, such as the semelfactive aspect, the iterative aspect, etc. For that use of the term, see "Grammatical aspect".

== Overview ==
Most languages of the world have formal means to express differences of number. One widespread distinction, found in English and many other languages, involves a simple two-way contrast between singular and plural number (car/cars, child/children, etc.). Discussion of other more elaborate systems of number appears below.

Grammatical number is a morphological category characterized by the expression of quantity through inflection or agreement. As an example, consider the English sentences below:

- That apple on the table is fresh.
- Those two apples on the table are fresh.

The quantity of apples is marked on the noun—"apple" singular number (one item) vs. "apples" plural number (more than one item)—on the demonstrative, that/those, and on the verb, is/are. In the second sentence, all this information is redundant, since quantity is already indicated by the numeral two.

A language has grammatical number when its noun forms are subdivided into morphological classes according to the quantity they express, such that:

1. Every noun form belongs to a number class (they are partitioned into disjoint classes by number).
2. Noun modifiers (such as adjectives) and verbs may also have different forms for each number subclass and inflect to match the number of the nouns they modify or agree with (number is an agreement category).

This is partly true for English: every noun and pronoun form is singular or plural (a few, such as "fish", "cannon" and "you", can be either, according to context). Some modifiers of nouns—namely the demonstrative determiners—and finite verbs inflect to agree with the number of the noun forms they modify or have as subject: this car and these cars are correct, while *this cars and *these car are incorrect. However, adjectives do not inflect for number, and many verb forms do not distinguish between singular and plural ("She/They went", "She/They can go", "She/They had gone", "She/They will go").

Many languages distinguish between count nouns and mass nouns. Only count nouns can be freely used in the singular and in the plural. Mass nouns, like "milk", "gold", and "furniture", are normally invariant. (In some cases, a normally mass noun X may be used as a count noun to collect several distinct kinds of X into an enumerable group; for example, a cheesemaker might speak of goat, sheep, and cow milk as milks.)

Not all languages have number as a grammatical category. In those that do not, quantity must be expressed either directly, with numerals, or indirectly, through optional quantifiers. However, many of these languages compensate for the lack of grammatical number with an extensive system of measure words.

Joseph Greenberg has proposed a number category hierarchy as a linguistic universal: "No language has a trial number unless it has a dual. No language has a dual unless it has a plural." This hierarchy does not account for the paucal.

== Geographical distribution ==
Obligatory plural marking of all nouns is found throughout the languages of western and northern Eurasia and most parts of Africa. The rest of the world's languages present a heterogeneous picture. Optional plural marking is common in Southeast and East Asia and Australian languages, and complete lack of plural marking is particularly found in New Guinea and Australian languages. In addition to the areal correlations, there also seems to be at least one correlation with morphological typology: isolating languages appear to favor no or non-obligatory plural marking. This can be seen particularly in Africa, where optionality or absence of plural marking is found particularly in the isolating languages of West Africa.

== Types of number ==
=== Singular and plural ===
One of the simplest number distinctions a language can make is singular and plural. Singular denotes exactly one referent, while plural denotes more than one referent. For example, in English:

- dog (singular, one)
- dogs (plural, two or more)

To mark number, English has different singular and plural forms for nouns and verbs (in the third person): "my dog watches television" (singular) and "my dogs watch television" (plural). This is not universal: Wambaya marks number on nouns but not verbs, and Onondaga marks number on verbs but not nouns. Latin has different singular and plural forms for nouns, verbs, and adjectives, in contrast to English where adjectives do not change for number. Tundra Nenets can mark singular and plural on nouns, verbs, adjectives, adverbs, and postpositions. The most common part of speech to show a number distinction is pronouns. An example of a personal pronoun system distinguishing singular and plural is that of Wayoró:

Wayoró pronouns
	Singular	Plural
First (exc.)	on	ote
First (inc.)	—N/a	txire
Second	en	djat
Third	ndeke	ndeat

=== Dual ===
As the singular denotes exactly one item, the dual number denotes exactly two items. For example, in Camsá:

- kes̈ – "dog" (singular)
- kes̈at – "two dogs" (dual)
- kes̈ëng – "dogs" (plural)

In languages with a singular/dual/plural paradigm, the exact meaning of plural depends on whether the dual is obligatory or facultative (optional). In contrast to English and other singular/plural languages where plural means two or more, in languages with an obligatory dual, plural strictly means three or more. This is the case for Sanskrit, North Mansi, and Alutiiq. In languages with a facultative dual, two of something can be referred to using either the dual or the plural, and so plural means two or more. This is the case for modern Arabic dialects, at least some Inuktitut dialects, and Yandruwandha. In some languages, the dual is obligatory in certain cases but facultative in others. In Slovene, it is obligatory for pronouns but facultative for nouns. In Comanche, it is obligatory when referring to humans, facultative for other animate nouns, and rarely used for inanimate nouns.

There are also languages where use of the dual number is more restricted than singular and plural. In the possessive noun forms of Northern Sámi, the possessor can be in the dual number, but the noun possessed can only be singular or plural. Pronouns are the only part of speech with a dual form in some Polynesian languages, including Samoan, Tuvaluan, (Note: As a small possible exception, the Tuvaluan verb for 'to go' has a special form in the first person dual inclusive future imperative.) and Māori. In Maltese, the dual only exists for about 30 specific nouns, of which it is obligatory for only eight (hour, day, week, month, year, once, hundred, and thousand). Words that can take a facultative dual in Maltese include egg, branch, tear, and wicker basket. In Mezquital Otomi, the dual can only be used by an adult male speaking to another adult male.

Māori pronouns
	Singular	Dual	Plural
First (exc.)	au/ahau	māua	mātou
First (inc.)	—N/a	tāua	tātou
Second	koe	kōrua	koutou
Third	ia	rāua	rātou

Dual number existed in all nouns and adjectives of Proto-Indo-European around 4000 BCE, and was inherited in some form in many of its prehistoric, protohistoric, ancient, and medieval descendents. Only rarely has it persisted in Indo-European languages to the modern day. It survived in Proto-Germanic in the first and second person pronouns, where it was then inherited by Old English, Old High German, Old Low German, Early Old Swedish, Old Norwegian, Old Icelandic, and Gothic. It continued in Icelandic until the 1700s, some dialects of Faroese until at least the late 1800s, and some dialects of North Frisian through the 1900s. From Proto-Greek it entered Ancient Greek, and from Proto-Indo-Iranian it entered Sanskrit. From Proto-Slavic, it still exists today in Slovene and the Sorbian languages. Indo-European languages that have long ago lost the dual still sometimes have residual traces of it, such as the English distinctions both vs. all, either vs. any, and neither vs. none. The Norwegian både, cognate with English both, has further evolved to be able to refer to more than two items, as in både epler, pærer, og druer, literally "both apples, pears, and grapes."

=== Trial ===
The trial number denotes exactly three items. For example, in Awa:

- iya – "dog" (singular)
- iyatade – "two dogs" (dual)
- iyatado – "three dogs" (trial)
- iyamadi – "dogs" (plural)

It is rare for a language to mark the trial on nouns, and some sources even claim that trial marking on nouns does not exist. However, it has been recorded for a few languages; besides Awa, Arabana, Urama, and Angaataha have trial number. It is much more common for a language to have trial pronouns, the case for the Austronesian languages of Larike, Tolai, Raga, and Wamesa. A minimal example is Nukna, which has only a single trial pronoun, nanggula, which can be either second or third person. The trial may also be marked on verbs, such as in Lenakel.

Larike pronouns
	Singular	Dual	Trial	Plural
First (exc.)	aʔu	arua	aridu	ami
First (inc.)	—N/a	itua	itidu	ite
Second	ane	irua	iridu	imi
Third	mane	matua	matidu	mati

While the dual can be obligatory or facultative, according to Greville Corbett there are no known cases of an obligatory trial, so the trial might always be facultative. However, languages may have both a facultative dual and a facultative trial, like in Larike, or an obligatory dual and a facultative trial, like in Ngan'gi.

Most languages with a trial are in the Austronesian family, and most non-Austronesian languages with a trial are nearby in Oceania. The latter category includes the Austronesian-influenced English creole languages of Tok Pisin, Bislama, and Pijin. In Australia, the trial can also be found in Aboriginal languages of many different language families. (Note: This includes: Pama–Nyungan – Arabana; Macro-Gunwinyguan – Anindilyakwa; Iwaidjan – Amurdak; Western Daly – Marrithiyel; Southern Daly – Ngan'gi; Wagaydyic – Wadjiginy; Worrorran – Worrorra; Possible language isolate – Giimbiyu) In Indonesia, trial pronouns are common in the storytelling of Abun, a possible language isolate. In the Solomon Islands, trial pronouns are used very frequently in Touo, either a Central Solomon language or a language isolate. As a result, bilingual speakers of Touo and Pijin will use trial pronouns a lot more commonly in Pijin than other speakers, for whom the trial is usually a lot less common than the dual. A very rare example of a spoken language with the trial (in both pronouns and verbs) outside of Oceania is Muklom Tangsa, spoken in northeast India.

=== Paucal ===
The paucal number represents 'a few', a small inexactly numbered group of items. For example, in Motuna:

- mahkata – "dog" (singular)
- mahkatakaro – "two dogs" (dual)
- mahkatanaa – "a few dogs" (paucal)
- mahkatangung – "dogs" (plural)

Almost all languages with a paucal also have a dual. Nouns in Mocoví only have singular, paucal, and plural. The pronouns in Mussau and Lihir have dual, trial, and paucal.

Lihir pronouns
	Singular	Dual	Trial	Paucal	Plural
First (exc.)	yo	gel	getol	gehet	ge
First (inc.)	—N/a	kito	kitol	kitahet	giet
Second	wa	gol	gotol	gohet	go
Third	e	dul	dietol	diehet	die

The lower bound of the paucal is usually defined by what other number categories exist in the language. In singular/paucal/plural paradigms, use of the paucal begins at two, but with the addition of the dual, the paucal begins at three. There is usually no exact upper bound on how many paucal refers to, and its approximate range depends on both language and context. It has been recorded as going up to about 5 in Warndarrang, about 6 in Baiso, 10 in Arabic, and about 10 or 15 in Murrinh-patha. In Manam, the primary factor for using the paucal is not a specific number range, but the referents forming a single group; although the paucal is most common between 3 and 5, it has been used with more than 20. In Paamese, a major factor is relative group size compared to the plural, such that even though the paucal generally means 12 or fewer, a group of 2,000 people may be referred to in the paucal when contrasted with a group of 100,000 referred to in the plural.

Much like the dual, it is crosslinguistically variable which words and parts of speech may be marked with the paucal. Baiso has the paucal only for nouns and not pronouns, whereas Yimas has the paucal only for pronouns and not nouns. In Meryam Mir, the paucal is mostly marked on the verbs. Avar has the paucal for only about 90 specific nouns, including brush, spade, snake, and daughter-in-law (the only kin term that can take the paucal in Avar). Takivatan Bunun has a paucal only in its distal demonstratives used in reference to people.

It is common for former trials to evolve in meaning to become paucals, and many Austronesian languages have paucal markers that are etymologically derived from the numeral three, indicating the old usage. It is less common for duals to evolve into paucals, but this has been observed in some dialects of Arabic. Paucals that are etymologically trials are sometimes incorrectly described as being trials. (Note: Sometimes this takes the form of neglecting to analyze the possible uses of the trial/paucal, but other times it takes the form of a published grammar describing a language as having a trial but then describing that "trial" as functioning like a paucal. Examples of the latter include works on Ambai and Sakao.) For example, trial pronouns were once described as being found in all the Kiwaian languages, but it is now recognized that many actually have a paucal instead. (Note: While the closely related Kiwaian languages of Kope and Urama still reportedly have a trial, Bamu, Waboda, and Kerewo all have a paucal.) Linguist Michael Cysouw has suggested that most languages reported to have trials in fact have mislabelled paucals, and that true trials are very rare. On the other hand, Luise Hercus stated in her published grammar of Arabana that the language's trial (which can be marked on nouns) is a true trial which cannot act as a paucal. Similar things have been said about trial pronouns in Larike and Anejom̃.

Russian has what has variably been called paucal numerals, the count form, (Note: The term "count form" has also been used to describe similar constructions in Mongondow, Lolak, and Ponosakan. In these languages, pronouns take on a unique form when following a numeral. Mongondow and Lolak also have singular, dual, trial, and plural pronoun forms, while Ponosakan lacks a trial. This means in Mongondow and Lolak, the count form is for a specific given number larger than three, and in Ponosakan it is for a number larger than two. Unlike Russian nouns, the use of these forms does not end above a certain number.) the adnumerative, or the genitive of quantification. When a noun in the nominative case has a numeral added to quantify it, the noun becomes genitive singular with 2, 3, or 4, but genitive plural with 5 or above. (Note: This also occurs to nouns in the accusative case, but only if they are inanimate, and it furthermore also occurs with the numerals half, one-and-a-half, sometimes a quarter, and any higher compound numerals ending in 2, 3, or 4. A very small number of nouns may take on a slightly different form where stress is changed to a different syllable; these nouns include час (hour), шар (ball), and след (footprint). Linguists have debated whether the form is actually genitive, or whether it is simply identical in form to the genitive in almost all cases but actually constituting a separate noun case or paucal conjugation.) Many linguists have described these as paucal constructions. However, some have disagreed on the grounds that a Russian noun cannot be declined to stand by itself and mean anywhere between 2 and 4. Similar constructions can be found in other Slavic languages, including Polish, Serbo-Croatian, and Slovene. Because Slovene also has a regular dual, there is a four-way distinction of nouns being singular with 1, dual with 2, plural with 3 or 4, and genitive plural with 5 or more.

=== Greater paucal ===
The greater paucal number is a larger paucal category, for an inexactly numbered group that is larger in size than a smaller paucal. It can be found in the pronouns of the Austronesian language of Sursurunga, which exhibit a five-way distinction described as singular, dual, paucal, greater paucal, and plural. The Sursurunga paucal is used for smaller groups, usually of about three or four, or for nuclear families of any size. The Sursurunga greater paucal is used for groups of four or more (and must be used instead of the plural for a group of two or more dyads). There is thus some overlap between the two groups; a family of four can be referred to in Sursurunga by either of the paucals. This distinction is found both in Sursurunga's personal pronouns and in two different sets of possessive pronouns, one for edible things and one for non-edible things.

Sursurunga pronouns
	Singular	Dual	Paucal	Greater paucal	Plural
First (exc.)	iau	giur	gimtul	gimhat	gim
First (inc.)	—N/a	gitar	gitul	githat	git
Second	u	gaur	gamtul	gamhat	gam
Third	a	diar	ditul	dihat	di

=== Quadral ===
The quadral number denotes exactly four items. Apparent examples of its use are almost entirely confined to pronouns, and specifically those in the languages of Oceania or in sign languages. It has been contested whether the quadral truly exists in natural language; some linguists have rejected it as an extant category, while others have accepted it. Some languages that have previously been described as having a quadral, like Sursurunga, have since been reanalyzed as having a paucal instead.

Like trial forms, quadral forms of pronouns have been said to be attested in the Melanesian pidgins of Tok Pisin, Bislama, and Pijin. However, while these are grammatically possible, they are rare, and plural forms are almost always used in their place.

Many different sign languages have been explicitly described as having quadral pronoun forms. (Note: This includes: American Sign Language; Argentine Sign Language; Brazilian Sign Language; British Sign Language; Czech Sign Language; German Sign Language; Hong Kong Sign Language; Jamaican Sign Language; Konchri Sain; Levantine Arabic Sign Language; New Zealand Sign Language; Russian Sign Language; Ugandan Sign Language) (Note: Other sign languages have been described as having pronouns for exactly four referents without being explicitly described as having a quadral. This includes Auslan, Danish Sign Language, and Icelandic Sign Language.) Estonian Sign Language has even been described as having the quadral for nouns.

Marshallese has been said to have the quadral as a regular feature in its pronoun system. While the apparent Marshallese quadral can mean exactly four, it also has an alternate rhetorical use in speeches to larger groups in order to impart a sense of individual intimacy. According to Greville Corbett, this means it is better classified as a paucal. However, there is not consensus that this alternate use means Marshallese does not truly have a quadral; the final 2016 reference grammar of Marshallese by Byron W. Bender, a linguist with expertise in the language, still refers to it as having a quadral. Besides singular, dual, trial, and quadral or paucal, Marshallese additionally has two different plural forms, one for five or more and one for two or more (referred to as multiple and plural absolute respectively), creating a partially overlapping six-way number distinction. Kove has been recorded as having a similar pronoun system as Marshallese, with one addition: the plural (2+) is split between two categories, one for members of the same family and one for members of different families, creating a seven-way distinction.

Marshallese pronouns (Rālik dialect)
	Singular	Dual	Trial	Quadral or Paucal	Multiple (5+)	Plural (2+)
First (exc.)	ña	kōmro	kōmjeel	kōm(je)eañ	kōmwōj	kōm
First (inc.)	—N/a	kōjro	kōjjeel	kōjeañ	kōjwōj	kōj
Second	kwe	koṃro	koṃjeel	koṃ(je)eañ	koṃwōj	koṃ
Third	e	erro	erjeel	er(je)jeañ	erwōj	er

A few other languages have also been claimed to have quadral pronouns. Robert Blust and others have said they exist in some of the Austronesian Kenyah languages, specifically the highland Lepoʼ Sawa dialect spoken in Long Anap. There seems to be no other published sources of info on this dialect's pronouns, and an investigation into the lowland Lebo’ Vo’ dialect has revealed a paucal instead of a quadral. A quadral claim has also been made for the animate demonstrative pronouns in Nauruan. Outside the Austronesian family, Abun storytelling reportedly frequently contains quadral pronouns in addition to trial ones. Perhaps the only known spoken language outside Oceania to have a claimed quadral is Apinayé of Brazil, recorded as having a third person pronominal prefix meaning "they four", although this has been little researched or described.

In some Austronesian languages with a singular/dual/trial/plural pronoun system, the plural forms are etymologically related to the number four. This has led to suggestions or assertions that historically a true quadral did exist, but it has since morphed into a plural form. (Note: This has been claimed for Tolai, Konomala, Patpatar, Kandas, Siar, Tabar, Label, Gao, Kwamera, Ma'ya, Matbat, Larike, Wamesa, Ambai, Loniu, Badeng, and Paluai. Some of these languages may be more accurately described as having a singular/dual/paucal/plural system, where the paucal markers are etymologically related to the word for three and the plural markers are related to the word for four.) It has thus been hypothesized that the quadral existed in Proto-Oceanic and Proto-Southern Vanuatu.

=== Quintal ===
The quintal number denotes exactly five items. Apparent examples of its use can mostly only be found in pronouns of sign languages. Like the quadral, its existence has been contested, and only some classifications accept it.

Like trial and quadral forms, rare quintal forms of pronouns have been said to be attested in Tok Pisin and Bislama. These languages insert numerals to represent exact numbers of referents. For example, in Bislama, the numerals tu (two) and tri (three) are contained within the second person pronouns yutufala (dual) and yutrifala (trial). These forms theoretically have no specific limit, but in practicality usually stop at three.

Bislama pronouns
	Standard			Rare			Standard
	Singular	Dual	Trial	Quadral	Quintal	...	Plural
First (exc.)	mi	mitufala	mitrifala	mifofala	mifaefala	...	mifala
First (inc.)	—N/a	yumitufala	yumitrifala	yumifofala	yumifaefala	...	yumi
Second	yu	yutufala	yutrifala	yufofala	yufaefala	...	yufala
Third	em	tufala	trifala	fofala	faefala	...	olgeta

Sign languages described as having a quintal in addition to the quadral include American Sign Language, Argentine Sign Language, British Sign Language, German Sign Language, Levantine Arabic Sign Language, and Ugandan Sign Language.

The validity has been debated of categorizing sign language pronouns as having a quadral or a quintal. Linguist Susan McBurney has contended that American Sign Language has a true dual, but that the trial, quadral, and quintal should instead be classified as numeral incorporation rather than grammatical number. This is motivated by the dual marker handshape being distinct from the handshape for the numeral two, in contrast to higher number markers; the ability to also incorporate these numerals into other words, including those for times and amounts; and the use of markers higher than the dual not being obligatory, with replacement by the plural being acceptable. There was not enough data available to McBurney to argue whether or not these reasons equally applied to other sign languages. Linguist Raquel Veiga Busto has argued they do not equally apply to Catalan Sign Language, and has applied the terms quadral and quintal to the language's pronouns for convenience without taking an official stance as to whether they are grammatical number or numeral incorporation. A third model is to categorize the apparent trial/quadral/quintal forms as "cardinal plurals", or forms of the grammatical plural number where the number of people is specified. Other authors have treated these concepts as perfectly equivalent, referring to pronoun numeral incorporation while still applying the terms quadral and quintal.

There are also cases of sign language pronouns indicating specific numbers of referents above five. Ugandan Sign Language has a rare pronoun form for exactly six people. Some American Sign Language speakers have incorporated numerals up to nine into inclusive pronouns upon solicitation. Israeli Sign Language theoretically has the grammatical ability to incorporate numerals up to ten into pronouns.

=== Greater plural ===
Greater plural is a number larger than and beyond plural. In various forms across different languages, it has also been called the global plural, the remote plural, the plural of abundance, the unlimited plural, and the superplural. For example, in Tswana:

- ntša – "dog" (singular)
- dintša – "dogs" (plural)
- mantša – "a very large number of dogs" (greater plural)

The greater plural may also be a component of larger number systems. Nouns in Barngarla have a four-way distinction of singular, dual, plural, and greater plural. The same four-way distinction is found in Mokilese pronouns, where a former trial has evolved to become a plural, leaving the former plural with a greater plural meaning. A different four-way distinction of singular, paucal, plural, and greater plural can be found in some verbs of Hualapai. A more complex system is found in Mele-Fila: pronouns distinguish singular, dual, plural, and greater plural, but articles attached to nouns distinguish singular, paucal, and plural. The result is that for full sentences, there is a combined five-way distinction of singular, dual, paucal, plural, and greater plural. Singular and plural have straightforward number agreements, whereas dual has dual pronouns but paucal articles, paucal has plural pronouns but paucal articles, and greater plural has greater plural pronouns but plural articles.

Mokilese pronouns
	Singular	Dual	Plural	Greater Plural
First (exc.)	ngoah/ngoahi	kama	kamai	kimi
First (inc.)	—N/a	kisa	kisai	kihs
Second	koah/koawoa	kamwa	kamwai	kimwi
Third	ih	ara/ira	arai/irai	ihr

The exact meaning of and terminology for the greater plural differs between languages. In some languages like Miya, it represents a large number of something, and has been called the plural of abundance. In other languages like Kaytetye, it can refer to all of something in existence, and has been called the global plural.

Like some other grammatical numbers, languages also vary as to which cases the greater plural may be used in. The greater plural is more common in nouns than in pronouns. Accordingly, in Kaytetye, the greater plural exists only in nouns and not pronouns. Oppositely, Mokilese has the greater plural in pronouns but not nouns. Chamacoco has the greater plural only in first person inclusive pronouns, second person pronouns, and first person inclusive verb inflections. Tigre has the greater plural only in a single word, nälät, which means a large number of deer.

=== Greatest plural ===
Greatest plural is a number larger than and beyond greater plural. It has also been called the "even greater plural". For example, in Warekena:

- ʧinu – "dog" (singular)
- ʧinune – "dogs" (plural)
- ʧinunawi – "very many dogs" (greater plural)
- ʧinunenawi – "very many dogs indeed, so many one cannot count them" (greatest plural)

A similar system is found in Banyun, where the greater plural represents unlimitedness, and the greatest plural represents "a higher degree of unlimitedness".

Linguist Daniel Harbour has represented the paucal, greater paucal, plural, greater plural, and greatest plural as collectively definable by "cuts" that divide the range of possible numbers into different sections. One low cut defines paucal and plural, and one high cut defines plural and greater plural. Two low cuts define paucal, greater paucal, and plural; one low cut and one high cut define paucal, plural, and greater plural; and two high cuts define plural, greater plural, and greatest plural. There does not appear to be any language with three such cuts, and so no language with three paucal categories and an "even greater paucal".

Because they are inexactly defined, the existence of multiple plural categories may blur the line between paucal and plural. For example, Mele-Fila is said to have a paucal, plural, and greater plural. However, the transition between plural and greater plural occurs around 15 to 20. This puts the Mele-Fila "plural" in range of some larger "paucals" described in other languages. Thus the distinction is muddied between a system of paucal, plural, greater plural, and a system of paucal, greater paucal, plural. Other examples can be found in the related languages of Northern Gumuz and Daatsʼiin. Northern Gumuz is said to mark the plural and greater plural on verbs, and Daatsʼiin is said to mark "three degrees of plurality" (plural, greater plural, and greatest plural) on verbs. In both languages though, the "plural" is often actually a paucal, understood to mean about two to four. However, in neither language is this always the case. The Northern Gumuz paucal/plural may sometimes refer to "much greater than four".

=== General, singulative, and plurative ===
In some languages, the default form of a noun is not singular, but rather general, which does not specify number and could mean one or more than one. Singular and plural forms are marked from the general form. The general is used when the specific number is deemed irrelevant or unimportant. In this system, the singular is often called the singulative, to distinguish it as derived from a different form. Similarly, the plural derived from the general has been called the plurative. For example, in Pular:

- bare – "dog(s)" (general, any number)
- bareeru – "dog" (singulative)
- bareeji – "dogs" (plurative)

However, some languages only have a two-way difference between general and plurative, like in Japanese:

- inu (犬) – "dog(s)" (general)
- inutachi (犬たち) – "dogs" (plurative)

Less common is a two-way distinction between general and singulative. No language has this as its default number contrast, although some languages have specific nouns with this distinction. For example, in Sidama:

- goto – "hyena(s)" (general)
- gotiiččo – "hyena" (singulative)

In some languages like Afar, few nouns have a three-way contrast of general/singulative/plurative, but nouns with two-way contrasts of general/singulative and general/plurative are both common.

There are also languages which regularly employ different number systems with a dual, trial, paucal, or greater plural in addition to a general:

- Hamer – general, singulative, and paucal:
  - qáski – "dog(s)" (general)
  - qáskino – "dog" (singulative)
  - qáskina – "a few dogs" (paucal)

- Warlpiri – general, dual, and paucal:
  - maliki – "dog(s)" (general)
  - malikijarra – "two dogs" (dual)
  - malikipatu – "a few dogs" (paucal)

- Bambassi – general, dual, and plurative:
  - kané – "dog(s)" (general)
  - kankuwe – "two dogs" (dual)
  - kanole – "dogs" (plurative)

- Baiso – general, singulative, paucal, and plurative:
  - ker – "dog(s)" (general)
  - kertiti – "dog" (singulative)
  - kerdʒedʒa – "a few dogs" (paucal)
  - keroor – "dogs" (plurative)

- Arabana – general, dual, trial, and plurative:
  - madla – "dog(s)" (general)
  - madlapula – "two dogs" (dual)
  - madlakarikari – "three dogs" (trial)
  - madlakari – "dogs" (plurative)

- Kaytetye – general, dual, plurative, and greater plural:
  - aleke – "dog(s)" (general)
  - aleketherre – "two dogs" (dual)
  - alekamerne – "dogs" (plurative)
  - alekeynenge – "all dogs" (greater plural)

Additional other systems can be seen in some languages only for specific nouns:

- In Burushaski, for nouns that have the same form in the singular and the plural, the plural marker signifies a greater plural:
  - čhúmo – "fish" (general)
  - čhúmomuc – "a quite large number of fish" (greater plural)
- In addition to general, singulative, and paucal, some nouns in Hamer have an additional distinction that has been analyzed either as a greater plural or a collective plural. It seems to unambiguously be a greater plural in specific cases, such as:
  - hámar – "Hamer person/people" (general)
  - hamartâ (m) / hamartóno (f) – "Hamer person" (singulative)
  - hámarra – "a few Hamer people" (paucal)
  - hámarro – "all Hamer people" (greater plural)
- Some dialects of Arabic have a few nouns that exhibit a five-way distinction of general, singulative, dual, plurative, and greater plural. In Damascus Arabic:
  - dəbbān – "fly/flies" (general)
  - dəbbāne – "fly" (singulative)
  - dəbbāntēn – "two flies" (dual)
  - dəbbānāt – "flies" (plurative)
  - dababīn – "many flies" (greater plural)

=== Minimal, unit augmented, and augmented ===
Minimal, unit augmented, and augmented are a different set of number categories for pronouns in languages that grammatically treat a first person dual inclusive pronoun identically to singular pronouns, and a first person trial inclusive pronoun identically to dual pronouns. It is a relative paradigm that replaces the absolute paradigm of singular, dual, trial, and plural for languages where absolute classification is ill-fitting.

For example, under a singular/dual/trial/plural analysis, the pronouns in Ilocano and Bininj Kunwok are:

Ilocano pronouns
	Singular	Dual	Plural
First (exc.)	co	—N/a	mi
First (inc.)	—N/a	ta	tayo
Second	mo	—N/a	yo
Third	na	—N/a	da

Bininj Kunwok pronouns
	Singular	Dual	Trial	Plural
First (exc.)	ngarduk	ngarrewoneng	—N/a	ngadberre
First (inc.)	—N/a	ngarrgu	garriwoneng	gadberre
Second	nguddanggi	ngurriwoneng	—N/a	ngudberre
Third	nuye/ngarre	berrewoneng	—N/a	bedberre

"Singular" does not exist for first person inclusive, which is by definition at least two people. In Ilocano, the "dual" only exists for first person inclusive, and likewise for the "trial" in Bininj Kunwok. Such categorization has been called "inelegant." It can also poorly reflect the grammatical structure: using the suffix -woneng, Bininj Kunwok treats the first person inclusive "trial" identically to the "duals" in other persons, even though it refers to three people.

The alternate analysis is thus:

Ilocano pronouns
	Minimal	Augmented
First (exc.)	co	mi
First (inc.)	ta	tayo
Second	mo	yo
Third	na	da

Bininj Kunwok pronouns
	Minimal	Unit augmented	Augmented
First (exc.)	ngarduk	ngarrewoneng	ngadberre
First (inc.)	ngarrgu	garriwoneng	gadberre
Second	nguddanggi	ngurriwoneng	ngudberre
Third	nuye/ngarre	berrewoneng	bedberre

The 'minimal' number is the smallest possible group for each category. For 1st exclusive, 2nd, and 3rd, this is one, and for 1st inclusive, this is two. Unit augmented is one more than minimal. For 1st exclusive, 2nd, and 3rd, this is two, and for 1st inclusive, this is three. Augmented is an equivalent to plural. In a minimal/augmented system, augmented means more than one for 1st exclusive, 2nd, and 3rd, and means more than two for 1st inclusive. In a minimal/unit augmented/augmented system, augmented means more than two for 1st exclusive, 2nd, and 3rd, and means more than three for 1st inclusive.

Besides Ilocano, languages considered to have a minimal/augmented pronoun system include Tagalog, Maranao, Maskelynes, and Ho-Chunk. The three-way distinction with the addition of unit augmented is mostly found in Australian Aboriginal languages, more specifically non-Pama-Nyungan languages. (Note: Besides Bininj Kunwok, this includes Rembarrnga, Ndjébbana, Guniyandi, Nyigina, Mangarrayi, Nunggubuyu, Warrwa, Burarra, Gaagudju, Malak-Malak, and Dalabon. It is also found in the Pama-Nyungan languages of Gurindji and Bilinarra.) Among the very few languages outside Australia it applies to is the Austronesian language Äiwoo and the Trans–New Guinea language of Kunimaipa.

Minimal and augmented may also combine with paucal to create a three-way pronoun system of minimal, paucal, and augmented/plural. This is reportedly the case with Kayapo. A four-way system of minimal, unit augmented, paucal, and plural is theoretically possible, but has never been observed in any natural language.

=== Composed numbers ===
Composed numbers are number categories built from multiple number markers combined. They are "a rare phenomenon."

==== Dual and plural ====
In Breton:

- lagad – "eye" (singular)
- daoulagad – "two eyes" (dual)
- lagadoù – "eyes" (plural)
- daoulagadoù – "pairs of eyes" (composed, dual + plural)

Breton only has the dual for nouns that naturally come in pairs, mostly body parts and items of clothing. The composed dual and plural indicates multiple sets of two each, whereas the regular plural represents multiple items without them conceptualized as coming in pairs. There is at least one attestation in Ancient Egyptian, from an inscription dating to the reign of Merneptah, of the exact same grammatical construction with the word "hand" (to mean multiple pairs of hands).

A similar category can be found in some nouns of Classical Arabic, where it has been called the "dual of the plural". However, its meaning is the reverse of the Breton construction. Rather than multiple sets of two each, it indicates two sets of multiple each. Thus there is rumḥun, spear (singular); rumḥani, two spears (dual); rimāḥun, spears (plural); and rimāḥāni, two groups of spears (dual of the plural). The Arabic dual of the plural more specifically implies a minimum of six items, or two groups of three each.

==== Plural and plural ====
In Breton and Classical Arabic, as well as in Somali and Maasai, some nouns may compose the plural with itself, to mean multiple different groups. This has been called the "plural of the plural", the plural plural, or the double plural. An Arabic example is kalb, dog (singular); aklub, dogs (plural); and akālib, groups of dogs (double plural). The Arabic double plural implies a minimum of nine items, or three groups of three each. Some Classical Arabic nouns may even compose the plural with itself yet again, to create the "plural plural plural", or triple plural, such as firqat, sect (singular); firaq, sects (plural); ʔafrāq, groups of sects (double plural); and ʔafārīq, groups of groups of sects (triple plural). The triple plural implies a minimum of 27 items. According to the 15th century linguist and polymath Jalal al-Din al-Suyuti, the Arabic word for male camel, jamalun, may be cumulatively pluralized up to six times: ʔajmulun (plural), ʔajmālun (double plural), jāmilun (triple plural), jimālun (quadruple plural), jimālatun (quintuple plural), and jimālātun (sextuple plural). (Note: Since the dual was a regular feature of Classical Arabic, a dual also exists for all of these examples: kalbāni for two dogs, firqatāni for two sects, and jamalāni for two camels. A more modern source lists jimālun as the regular plural of jamalun (instead of the quadruple plural), from which is formed an additional dual of the plural, jimālāni, meaning two herds of male camels.)

=== Conflated numbers ===
Some number categories, formed from the combination of other existing categories, have only been attested as occurring secondarily alongside other grammatical number systems within a language. These have been called conflated numbers.

==== Singular-dual ====
A few languages have specific parts of speech that distinguish between two number categories: one or two, and more than two. The former category can be thought of as a single conflated singular-dual number. For example, in the nouns of Kalaw Lagaw Ya:

- ùmay – "dog(s)" (one or two)
- ùmayl – "dogs" (plural, three or more)

The pronouns and verbs of Kalaw Lagaw Ya distinguish singular, dual, and plural, leaving no ambiguity between one and two in full sentences.

While Kalaw Lagaw Ya has the singular-dual in all nouns, Central Pame has it specifically in inanimate nouns, such as čihàgŋ, spoon(s) (one or two), and šihàgŋ, spoons (plural, three or more). Pame animate nouns largely have a full three-way distinction: nadò, dog (singular); nadòi, two dogs (dual); and ladòt, dogs (plural).

The singular-dual may also be found in verbs: Hopi verbs distinguish singular-dual and plural (3+), while Hopi pronouns distinguish singular and plural (2+). The dual can be represented with a plural pronoun combined with a singular-dual verb. This phenomenon has been called a constructed number or a Frankendual. However, Hopi nouns still overtly distinguish singular, dual, and plural. Idi goes even further by having no specific dual markers of any kind for any part of speech, with the only way to represent dual being combining a singular-dual verb with a plural noun. A more complex example comes from Koasati, where besides plural, some verbs have singular and dual, some verbs just have singular, and some verbs just have singular-dual:

Some Koasati verbs
Verb	Singular	Dual	Plural
"to sit"	cokkó:lin	cikkí:kan	í:san
"to run"	walí:kan	tóɬkan	
"to die"	íllin		hápkan

==== Singular-dual-trial ====
In the Tucanoan language of Tuyuca, inanimate classifiers (which attach to nouns) distinguish one to three versus more than three:

- hoópóro – "banana(s)" (one to three)
- hoópóri – "bananas" (plural, four or more)

The related Tucanoan language of Wanano also has some nouns that function this way.

The same number distinction is also seen in the verb for "climb" in Miriwoong, an Australian language.

==== Singular-dual-trial-quadral ====
In Piratapuyo, closely related to Wanano, some nouns with inanimate classifiers distinguish between one and four versus more than four:

- pika – "finger(s)" (one to four)
- pikari – "fingers" (plural, five or more)

==== Singular-paucal ====
Zuni, similarly to Hopi, shows a singular-dual versus plural distinction in its verbs, and a plural noun with a nonplural verb indicates dual. However, the opposite combination, a nonplural noun with a plural verb, is also possible, and can be variably interpreted as one, two, or a few. Zuni nouns have thus been described as having a "singular-paucal" versus plural distinction.

Some nouns in Navajo have also been described as working this way, such as:

- kǫ – "fire(s)" (one or several)
- daakǫ – "fires" (many)

Similarly, although Larike pronouns exhibit singular, dual, trial, and plural, they can only be used for human referents. For nonhuman referents, there are only two possible numbers, which are marked on the verb: a plural, and a "singular" that can be used to mean anywhere from one to a few.

==== Nondual ====
The nondual (Note: Variously spelled as either nondual or non-dual.) number means any number except two. For example, in Wangkumara:

- d̯it̯i – "dog(s)" (nondual, one or three or more than three)
- d̯it̯ibula – "two dogs" (dual)

Wangkumara does not normally mark number directly on nouns. Instead, it distinguishes singular, dual, and plural using adnominal pronouns, plural-indicating adjectives like 'many', or marking on other adjectives. The exception is that nouns take the dual enclitic when referring to two. Thus for nouns alone, the only distinction is dual and nondual.

A more complex system can be found in the Tanoan languages of Kiowa and Jemez. These languages have what is called an inverse number system. Although the languages distinguish between singular, dual, and plural, any given noun only has a single possible number marker. What number is implicit in an unmarked noun depends on its class. In Kiowa, by default, Class I nouns are singular-dual, Class II nouns are plural (two or more), Class III nouns are dual, and Class IV nouns are mass nouns with no number. The inverse number marker changes the noun to whatever number(s) the unmarked noun isn't, such as changing Class III nouns from dual to nondual. In Jemez, Class III nouns are the opposite: they are inherently nondual, and get marked for dual.

Example Kiowa nouns
Class	Noun	Singular	Dual	Plural
I	bug	pól		póldau
II	stick	áadau	áa	
III	tomato	k’âundau	k’âun	k’âundau
IV	rock	ts’ów		

Some Jemez nouns
Class	Noun	Singular	Dual	Plural
I	crow	kyáá	kyáásh	
II	bridge	wáákwesh		wáákwe
III	flower	pá	pásh	pá
IV	snow	zú		

The nondual versus dual distinction may also be found in verbs. Timbisha has verbs with several different possible number distinctions, including nondual ones. A more minor example is Forest Enets, which has the nondual only in its intransitive third person imperative verbs.

Example Timbisha verbs
Verb	Singular	Dual	Plural
"to emerge"	to’e	toto’e	kɨa
"to fall"	pahe	pokoa	
"to kill"	pakka		wasɨ
"to go"	mi’a	mimi’a	mi’a

The nondual violates a proposed universal of conflated systems, namely that they will always encompass every value except plural. Regardless, the nondual has still been referred to as a conflation of number values.

=== Numberless languages ===
A small number of languages have no grammatical number at all, even in pronouns. A well known example is Pirahã. Acehnese comes close, but appears to have a singular/plural distinction only in the first person pronouns.

Pirahã pronouns
First	ti
Second	gíxai
Third	hiapióxio

=== Summary of number systems ===
Grammatical number distinctions found in world languages
System	Number of distinctions	Example		
System	Number of distinctions	Language	Part(s) of speech	Source
(Numberless)	1	Pirahã	—N/a	
Singular, plural	2	English	Nouns, pronouns, verbs (3rd person)	
General, singulative	2	Sidama	Nouns (some)	
General, plurative	2	Japanese	Nouns	
General, greater plural	2	Burushaski	Nouns (some)	
Minimal, augmented	2	Ilocano	Pronouns	
Singular-dual, plural	2	Kalaw Lagaw Ya	Nouns	
Singular-dual, plural	2	Hopi	Verbs	
Singular-paucal, plural	2	Zuni	Nouns	
Singular-paucal, plural	2	Larike	Verbs (non-human referents)	
Singular-dual-trial, plural	2	Tuyuca	Nouns (inanimate)	
Singular-dual-trial-quadral, plural	2	Piratapuyo	Nouns (some)	
Nondual, dual	2	Wangkumara	Nouns	
Nondual, dual	2	Timbisha	Verbs (some)	
Singular, dual, plural	3	Alutiiq	Nouns, pronouns, verbs	
Singular, paucal, plural	3	Mocoví	Nouns	
Singular, plural, double plural	3	Somali	Nouns (some)	
Singular, plural, greater plural	3	Tswana	Nouns (some)	
General, singulative, paucal	3	Hamer	Nouns (some)	
General, singulative, plurative	3	Pular	Nouns	
General, dual, paucal	3	Warlpiri	Nouns	
General, dual, plurative	3	Bambassi	Nouns	
Minimal, unit augmented, augmented	3	Bininj Kunwok	Pronouns	
Minimal, paucal, plural	3	Kayapo	Pronouns	
Singular, dual, trial, plural	4	Urama	Nouns, pronouns	
Singular, dual, trial, plural	4	Lenakel	Verbs, pronouns	
Singular, dual, paucal, plural	4	Motuna	Nouns	
Singular, dual, paucal, plural	4	Yimas	Pronouns	
Singular, dual, plural, dual + plural (4+)	4	Breton	Nouns (some)	
Singular, dual, plural, plural + dual (6+)	4	Classical Arabic	Nouns (some)	
Singular, dual, plural, double plural	4	Classical Arabic	Nouns (some)	
Singular, dual, plural, greater plural	4	Barngarla	Nouns	
Singular, dual, plural, greater plural	4	Mokilese	Pronouns	
Singular, paucal, plural, greater plural	4	Hualapai	Verbs (some)	
Singular, plural, greater plural, greatest plural	4	Warekena	Nouns	
Singular, plural, greater plural, greatest plural	4	Daatsʼiin	Verbs (some cases)	
General, singulative, paucal, and plurative	4	Baiso	Nouns	
General, singulative, paucal, greater plural	4	Hamer	Nouns (some)	
General, dual, trial, plurative	4	Arabana	Nouns	
General, dual, plurative, greater plural	4	Kaytetye	Nouns	
Singular, dual, trial, quadral*, plural	5	Russian Sign Language	Pronouns	
Singular, dual, trial, paucal, plural	5	Mussau	Pronouns	
Singular, dual, paucal, greater paucal, plural	5	Sursurunga	Pronouns	
Singular, dual, paucal, plural, greater plural	5	Mele-Fila	Pronoun/article combinations	
Singular, dual, plural, double plural, triple plural	5	Classical Arabic	Nouns (some)	
General, singulative, dual, plurative, greater plural	5	Damascus Arabic	Nouns (some)	
Singular, dual, trial, quadral*, quintal*, plural	6	Levantine Arabic Sign Language	Pronouns	
Singular, dual, trial, quadral*/paucal, plural (5+), plural (2+)	6	Marshallese	Pronouns	
Singular, dual, trial, quadral*, quintal*, [six referents]*, plural	7	Ugandan Sign Language	Pronouns	
Singular, dual, plural, double plural, triple plural, quadruple plural, quintuple plural, sextuple plural	8	Classical Arabic (15th century)	The word for camel	
Singular, dual, trial, quadral*, quintal*, [six referents]*, ... [nine referents]*, plural	10	American Sign Language	Pronouns (some speakers)	
Singular, dual, trial, quadral*, quintal*, [six referents]*, ... [ten referents]*, plural	11	Israeli Sign Language	Pronouns	
Singular, dual, trial, ... plural	?^{†}	Bislama	Pronouns	
*Category's existence has been debated^{†}No exact limit

== Distributives and collectives ==
Distributives and collectives are two related categories whose inclusion in grammatical number has been contested. Both describe how members of a group are viewed, rather than how many members are in that group.

=== Distributive plural ===
The distributive plural denotes multiple entities that are separated and distinct, either in physical space, through time, or by type. For example, in Dagaare:

- baa – "dog" (singular)
- baare – "dogs" (plural)
- baarɛɛ – "dogs in different locations" (distributive plural)

In Dagaare, the distributive plural may indicate either referents in different locations or referents of different types. By contrast, in Quileute, it only means referents in different locations, and in Mohawk, it only means referents of different types. Thus in Mohawk there is ierakewáhtha’, towel, and ierakewahtha’shòn:’a, various products for wiping like towels, napkins, and so on. It is also possible to have distributive pronouns, such as those found in Yir-Yoront, which distinguish between "you and I" and "you and I, acting separately".

Yir-Yoront pronouns (nominative)
	Singular	Dual	Dual (Distributive)	Plural	Plural (Distributive)
First (exc.)	ngoyo	ngelen	ngel-ngelen	ngethn	ngel-ngethn
First (inc.)	—N/a	ngele	ngel-ngele	ngopol	ngol-ngopol
Second	nhorto	nhopol	nhol-nhopol	nhepl	nhel-nhepl
Third	nholo	pula	pul-pula	pilin	pil-pilin

However, it is most common to mark the distributive on verbs. This may distribute the action across various individuals, such as in the Paraguayan Guaraní constructions: ha’ekuéra opo’i ita’i, "they dropped a pebble"; ha’ekuéra opo’ipo’i ita’i, "they each dropped a pebble". It may also distribute the action across time, such as in the Nêlêmwa words taxe, to throw, and taraxe, to throw (repeatedly). Some ǂʼAmkoe verbs offer multiple senses of the distributive for one verb: qǁʼao, to stab; kíqǁʼaotcu, to stab (repeatedly); kíqǁʼaoqǁo, to stab (several things at different locations). The distributive plural may be a part of even larger paradigms: in Urarina, intransitive verbs describing a positional state (such as "it is lying on its side") distinguish between singular, dual, paucal, plural (4+), and distributive plural.

While some linguists have treated the distributive as a category of grammatical number, others have rejected this. A few things make its categorization as a grammatical number potentially problematic. Several languages allow the distributive to be added to mass nouns that are normally not considered to have number, such as the Dagaare salema, gold, and salemɛɛ, "gold in different locations". This can be described as a nondistributive versus distributive distinction, with neither being singular or plural. Several languages also allow separate plural and distributive markers to be added to a word at the same time. Additionally, grammatical number frequently requires agreement, but distributivity does not.

=== Collective plural ===
The collective plural denotes multiple entities that are considered together as a unit. It is often conceptualized as the opposite of the distributive. For example, in Tunica:

- sa – "dog" (singular)
- sa'unima – "two dogs" (dual)
- sasinima – "dogs" (plural)
- sahchi – "pack of dogs" (collective plural)

The collective may be limited to just a small subset of nouns, like in Kujireray, where it can only be used with certain insects and small objects: enipora, fly; sinipora, flies; and banipora, swarm of flies. Just like the distributive, the collective can also change the meaning of verbs, as in Panyjima: karri, to stand, and karrinyayi, to stand together. In Vaeakau-Taumako, the collective is indicated through different articles: te tai, the person; ngha tai, the people; and a tai, the group of people.

The collective presents similar issues as the distributive in its potential classification as grammatical number, including the fact that some languages allow both collective and plural markers on the same words. Adding a collective to a plural word does not change the number of referents, only how those referents are conceptualized.

== Number in specific languages ==
=== Basque ===
Basque declension has four grammatical numbers: indefinite, definite singular, definite plural, and definite close plural:

- The indefinite is used after the question words Zer? ("What?"), Zein? ("Which?") and Zenbat? ("How much? / How many?"), after indefinite numerals, such as zenbait ("some"), hainbat ("several"), honenbeste / horrenbeste / hainbeste ("so many / so much"), bezainbeste ("as much as / as many as"), and before asko, anitz (this one can go before nouns), ugari, pilo bat, mordo bat, after makina bat ("much, many, a lot, lots of, plenty of..."), before gutxi ("a few, little") and batzuk ("some"), and the numbers, if they do not refer to a defined amount: Zer etxe eraberritu duzu? ("What house[s] have you renewed?"), Zer etxe eraberritu dituzu? ("What houses have you renewed?"). Zein etxetan bizi zinen? ("In what house[s] were you living?"). Zenbat etxe dituzu? ("How many houses have you got?"). Lapurrak hainbat etxetan sartu dira ("The thieves have broken into a number of houses"). Lapurra hainbeste etxetan sartu da! ("The thief has broken into so many houses!").

A noun followed by an adjective or a demonstrative is in the absolutive case, and the last word in the phrase is declined: Etxea ("The house / House"). Etxe bat ("A house"). Etxe handi bat ("A big house"). Etxe handi batean ("In a big house"). Etxe handi hori ("That big house"). Etxe zuri handi horretan ("In that big white house").

If the amount is known, the plural grammatical numbers are used: Lapurrak bi etxetan sartu dira ("The thieves have broken in two houses" [indefinite: the houses are unknown to the speakers]). Lapurrak bizpahiru etxetan sartu dira ("The thieves have broken in two or three houses" [indefinite: the speakers does not know the exact amount of houses]). Lapurrak bi etxeetan sartu dira ("The thieves have broken in both houses" [definite plural: both are known to the speakers]). Lapurrak bi etxeotan sartu dira ("The thieves have broken in these two houses" [definite close plural: both are being shown by the speaker]).

The indefinite is also used in some idioms and set phrases: Egun on! ("Good day! / Good morning!"), On egin! ("Bon appetit!"), Etxez etxe ("From house to house"), Mezatara joan ("Go to the mass"), Etxe bila ibili ("To look for a house"), and as the root for compound words (etxe-galgarri, etxekalte, "Person or thing which brings loss to a home") or derivative words (etxeratu, "To go home / To send home"; etxekoi, "fond of home"; etxegile, "housebuilder").

- The definite singular is used to designate a person or thing known or to present: Zer da eraikin hori? Nire etxea da. ("What is that building? It is my home"). Etxea nirea da ("The house is mine").
- The definite plural designates people or things known or present: Zer dira eraikin horiek? Nire etxeak dira. ("What are those buildings? They are my houses"). Etxeak nireak dira ("The houses are mine").
- The definite close plural refers to people or things which are in the vicinity of the speakers: Zer dira eraikinok? Nire etxeak dira. ("What are those buildings? They are my houses"). Etxeok nireak dira ("These houses are mine").

It is also used to include oneself in the group referred to: Nafarrak festazaleak dira ("The Navarrese like celebrations": the speaker is not a Navarrese). Nafarrok festazaleak gara ("We Navarrese like celebrations": the speaker is a Navarrese).

Verbs have four singular persons and three plural ones, as follows:

Singular:

- First person (the speaker): Euskalduna naiz ("I am Basque"). Testua idatzi dut ("I have written the text").
- Informal second person (the person the speaker is addressing to, i.e., an inferior, an animal, a child, a monologue with oneself): Euskalduna haiz ("Thou art Basque"). In some tenses, there are different verbs for a man or a woman: Testua idatzi duk ("Thou hast written the text [said to a man, a boy]", Testua idatzi dun ("Thou hast written the text [said to a woman, a girl]").
- Formal second person (the person the speaker is addressing to: a superior, somebody older, one's parents), the most frequent one: Euskalduna zara ("You [singular] are Basque"). Testua idatzi duzu ("You [sing.] have written the text").
- Third person (neither the speaker nor the listener): Handia da ("He / She / It is big"). Testua idatzi du ("He / She / It has written the text").

Plural:

- First person (the speaker and somebody else at least): Euskaldunak gara ("We are Basque"). Testua idatzi dugu ("We have written the text").
- Second person (the addressees): Euskaldunak zarete ("You [plural] are Basque [said to a group, either informally or formally]"). Testua idatzi duzue ("You [pl.] have written the text").
- Third person (more than one person outside the conversation): Handiak dira ("They are big"). Testua idatzi dute ("They have written the text").

=== English ===
English is typical of most world languages, in distinguishing only between singular and plural number. Singular corresponds to exactly one (or minus one), while plural applies to all other cases, including more and less than one or even 1.0. The plural form of a noun is usually created by adding the suffix -(e)s. The pronouns have irregular plurals, as in "I" versus "we", because they are ancient and frequently used words going back to when English had a well developed system of declension. English verbs distinguish singular from plural number in the third person present tense ("He goes" versus "They go"). Old English also contained dual grammatical numbers; Modern English retains a few residual terms reflective of dual number (such as both and neither, as opposed to all and none respectively), but they are generally considered to no longer constitute a separate grammatical number.

=== Finnish ===
The Finnish language has a plural form of almost every noun case (except the comitative, which is formally only plural).

- talo – house
- talot – houses
- taloissa – in the houses

However, when a number is used, or a word signifying a number (monta- "many"), the singular version of the partitive case is used.

- kolme taloa – three houses

and where no specific number is mentioned, the plural version of the partitive case is used

- taloja

and in the possessive (genitive)

- talon ovi (the house's door)
- talojen ovet (the houses' doors)

=== French ===
In modern Romance languages, nouns, adjectives and articles are declined according to number (singular or plural only). Verbs are conjugated for number as well as person. French treats zero as using the singular number, not the plural.

In its written form, French declines nouns for number (singular or plural). In speech, however, the majority of nouns (and adjectives) are not declined for number. The typical plural suffix, -s or -es, is silent, no longer indicating a change in pronunciation. Spoken number marking on the noun appears when liaison occurs.

- Some plurals do differ from the singular in pronunciation; for example, masculine singulars in -al [al] sometimes form masculine plurals in -aux [o].
- Proper nouns are not pluralized, even in writing. (Les voitures, but Les Peugeot 404)

Normally, the article or determiner is the primary spoken indicator of number.

=== Hebrew ===
In Modern Hebrew, a Semitic language, most nouns have only singular and plural forms, such as ספר /ˈsefeʁ/ "book" and ספרים /sfaˈʁim/ "books", but some have distinct dual forms using a distinct dual suffix (largely nouns pertaining to numbers or time, such as אלפיים /alˈpajim/ "two thousand" and שבועיים /ʃvuˈajim/ "two weeks"), some use this dual suffix for their regular plurals (largely body parts that tend to come in pairs, such as עיניים /eiˈnajim/ "eyes", as well as some that do not, such as שיניים /ʃiˈnajim/ "teeth"), and some are inherently dual (such as מכנסיים /mixnaˈsajim/ "pants" and אופניים /ofaˈnajim/ "bicycle"). Adjectives, verbs, and pronouns agree with their subjects' or antecedents' numbers, but only have a two-way distinction between singular and plural; dual nouns entail plural adjectives, verbs, and pronouns.

=== Mortlockese ===
The Mortlockese language of the Mortlock Islands uses a base-ten counting system. Pronouns, nouns and demonstratives are used exclusively in the singular and plural forms through the use of classifiers, suffixes and prefixes. There are no other dual or trial grammatical forms in the Mortlockese language. Different forms that can be used in the language include first person singular and plural words, second person singular words like umwi, second person plural words like aumi used to refer to an outside group, and third person plural words.

=== Russian ===
Modern Russian has a singular vs plural number system, but the declension of noun phrases containing numeral expressions follows complex rules. For example, У меня (есть) одна книга/три книги/пять книг ("I have one book-nom. sing./three book-gen. sing./five book-gen. plur."). See Dual number: Slavic languages for a discussion of number phrases in Russian and other Slavic languages.

The numeral "one" also has a plural form used with pluralia tantum, as in одни часы, "one clock". The same form is used with countable nouns in meaning "only": Кругом одни идиоты "There are only idiots around".

=== Swedish ===
Swedish inflects nouns in singular and plural. The plural of the noun is usually obtained by adding a suffix, according to the noun's declension. The suffixes are as follows: -or in the 1st declension (e.g. flicka – flickor), -ar in the 2nd (e.g. bil – bilar), -er in the 3rd (e.g. katt – katter), -n in the 4th (e.g. äpple – äpplen) and no inflectional suffix is added for the nouns in the 5th declension (e.g. bord – bord). Verbs in Swedish do not distinguish singular from plural number, but adjectives do.

=== Constructed languages ===
Auxiliary languages often have fairly simple systems of grammatical number. In one of the most common schemes (found, for example, in Interlingua and Ido), nouns and pronouns distinguish between singular and plural, but not other numbers, and adjectives and verbs do not display any number agreement. In Esperanto, however, adjectives must agree in both number and case with the nouns that they qualify.

Láadan uses a singular–paucal–superplural breakdown, with paucal indicating between two and five items inclusive.

== Formal expression ==
Synthetic languages typically distinguish grammatical number by inflection. (Analytic languages, such as Chinese, often do not mark grammatical number.)

Some languages have no marker for the plural in certain instances, e.g. Swedish hus – "house, houses" (but huset – "the house", husen – "the houses").

In most languages, the singular is formally unmarked, whereas the plural is marked in some way. Other languages, most notably the Bantu languages, mark both the singular and the plural, for instance Swahili (see example below). The third logical possibility, found in only a few languages, such as Welsh and Sinhala, is an unmarked plural contrasting with marked singular. Below are some examples of number affixes for nouns (where the inflecting morphemes are underlined):

- Affixation (by adding or removing prefixes, suffixes, infixes, or circumfixes):
  - Estonian: puu "tree, wood" (singular) – puud "the trees, woods" (nominative plural), or kolm puud "three trees" (partitive singular)
  - Finnish: lehmä "cow, the cow" (singular) – lehmät "the cows" (nominative plural)
  - Turkish: dağ "the mountain" (singular) – dağlar "mountains" (plural)
  - Slovene: lípa "linden" (singular) – lípi "linden" (dual) – lípe "linden" (plural)
  - Sanskrit: पुरुषस् puruṣas "man" (singular) – पुरुषौ puruṣau "two men" (dual) – पुरुषास् puruṣās "men" (plural)
  - Sinhala: මලක් malak "flower" (singular) – මල් mal "flowers" (plural)
  - Swahili: mtoto "child" (singular) – watoto "children" (plural)
  - Ganda: omusajja "man" (singular) – abasajja "men" (plural)
  - Georgian: კაცი k'aci "man" (singular) – კაცები k'acebi "men" (where -i is the nominative case marker)
  - Welsh: plant "children" (collective) – plentyn "child" (singulative) Care should be taken with Welsh not to confuse singulative/collective with singular/plural, see Colloquial Welsh nouns.
  - Barngarla: wárraidya "emu" (singular) – wárraidyalbili "two emus" (dual) – wárraidyarri "emus" (plural) – wárraidyailyarranha "a lot of emus" (greater plural)
- Simulfix (through various kinds of internal sound alternations):
  - Arabic: كِتَاب kitāb "book" (singular) – كُتُب kutub "books" (plural)
  - Welsh: adar "birds" (collective) – deryn "bird" (singulative). The -yn suffix, which adds an extra syllable to the root word (adar), causes the initial (and semantically empty) syllable to be dropped. The suffix also causes the same vowel affection as seen in the affixation type above and the apophony type below, changing the root vowel a to e. The same process can be seen in the pair hosan "sock" and sanau "socks" where the plural suffix -au causes the initial syllable (ho-) to be dropped.
- Apophony (alternating between different vowels):
  - Dinka: kat "frame" – kɛt "frames"
  - English: foot – feet
  - German: Mutter "mother" – Mütter "mothers"
  - Welsh: bachgen "boy" – bechgyn "boys" (See affection)
- Reduplication (through doubling):
  - Indonesian: orang "person" (singular) – orang-orang "people" (plural); BUT dua orang "two people" and banyak orang "many people" (reduplication is not done when the context is clear and when the plurality is not emphasized)
  - Pipil: kumit "pot" (singular) – kuj-kumit "pots" (plural); similar to Indonesian, reduplication is omitted when plurality is marked elsewhere or not emphasized.
  - Somali: buug "book" (singular) – buug-ag "books" (plural)
- Suppletion (the use of the one word as the inflected form of another word):
  - Serbo-Croatian: čov(j)ek "man" (singular) – ljudi "men, folks" (plural)
  - English: person (singular) – people (plural) (used colloquially. In formal and careful speech persons is still used as the plural of person while people also has its own plural in peoples.)
- Tonality (by changing a drag tone to a push tone)
  - Limburgish: daãg "day" (singular) – daàg "days" (plural)
  - Ancient Greek: γλῶσσα glôssa "tongue" (singular) – γλώσσα glǒssa "two tongues" (dual)

Elements marking number may appear on nouns and pronouns in dependent-marking languages or on verbs and adjectives in head-marking languages.

English (dependent-marking)	Western Apache (head-marking)
Paul is teaching the cowboy.	Paul idilohí yiłch'ígó'aah.
Paul is teaching the cowboys.	Paul idilohí yiłch'ídagó'aah.

In the English sentence above, the plural suffix -s is added to the noun cowboy. In the equivalent in Western Apache, a head-marking language, a plural affix da- is added to the verb yiłch'ígó'aah "he is teaching him", resulting in yiłch'ídagó'aah "he is teaching them" while noun idilohí "cowboy" is unmarked for number.

=== Number particles ===
Plurality is sometimes marked by a specialized number particle (or number word). This is frequent in Australian and Austronesian languages. An example from Tagalog is the word mga [mɐˈŋa]: compare bahay "house" with mga bahay "houses". In Kapampangan, certain nouns optionally denote plurality by secondary stress: ing laláki "man" and ing babái "woman" become ding láláki "men" and ding bábái "women".

=== Classifiers with number morphology ===
In Sanskrit and some other languages, number and case are fused categories and there is concord for number between a noun and its predicator. Some languages however (for example, Assamese) lack this feature.

Languages that show number inflection for a large enough corpus of nouns or allow them to combine directly with singular and plural numerals can be described as non-classifier languages. On the other hand, there are languages that obligatorily require a counter word or the so-called classifier for all nouns. For example, the category of number in Assamese is fused with the category of classifier, which always carries a definite/indefinite reading. The singularity or plurality of the noun is determined by the addition of the classifier suffix either to the noun or to the numeral. Number system in Assamese is either realized as numeral or as nominal inflection, but not both. Numerals [ek] 'one' and [dui] 'two', can be realized as both free morpheme and clitics. When used with classifiers, these two numerals are cliticised to the classifiers.

Pingelapese is a Micronesian language spoken on Pingelap Atoll and on Pohnpei, an island in the eastern Caroline Islands. In Pingelapese, the meaning, use, or shape of an object can be expressed through numerical classifiers, which combine a noun and a number to provide more detail about the object. In these classifier phrases, the classifier follows the noun. There are at least five sets of numerical classifiers in Pingelapese, with each classifier having a numeral element and a classifier element that corresponds to the noun it describes. A separate set of numerical classifiers is used when the object is not specified, as in the names of the days of the week.

=== Obligatoriness of number marking ===
In many languages, such as English, number is obligatorily expressed in every grammatical context. Some limit number expression to certain classes of nouns, such as animates or referentially prominent nouns (as with proximate forms in most Algonquian languages, opposed to referentially less prominent obviative forms). In others, such as Chinese and Japanese, number marking is not consistently applied to most nouns unless a distinction is needed or already present.

A very common situation is for plural number to not be marked if there is any other overt indication of number, as for example in Hungarian: virág "flower"; virágok "flowers"; hat virág "six flowers".

=== Transnumeral ===
Many languages, such as Chinese, Korean, Japanese and Malay (including Indonesian), particularly spoken in Southeast and East Asia, have optional number marking. In such cases, an unmarked noun is neither singular nor plural, but rather ambiguous as to number. This is called transnumeral or sometimes general number, abbreviated trn. In many such languages, number tends to be marked for definite and highly animate referents, most notably first-person pronouns.

== Number agreement ==
=== Verbs ===
In many languages, verbs are conjugated according to number. Using French as an example, one says je vois (I see), but nous voyons (we see). The verb voir (to see) changes from vois in the first person singular to voyons in the plural. In everyday English, this often happens in the third person (she sees, they see), but not in other grammatical persons, except with the verb to be.

In English, and in Indo-European languages in general, the verb is singular or plural to match whether the subject of the sentence is singular or plural. Oppositely, in Xavante, transitive verbs match the number of the object. In West Greenlandic, the verb is marked for the number of both the subject and the object.

=== Adjectives and determiners ===
Adjectives often agree with the number of the noun they modify. For example, in French, one says un grand arbre [œ̃ ɡʁɑ̃t aʁbʁ] "a tall tree", but deux grands arbres [dø ɡʁɑ̃ zaʁbʁ] "two tall trees". The singular adjective grand becomes grands in the plural, unlike English "tall", which remains unchanged.

Determiners may agree with number. In English, the demonstratives "this", "that" change to "these", "those" in the plural, and the indefinite article "a", "an" is either omitted or changes to "some". In French and German, the definite articles have gender distinctions in the singular but not the plural. In Italian, Spanish and Portuguese, both definite and indefinite articles are inflected for gender and number, e.g. Portuguese o, a "the" (singular, masc./fem.), os, as "the" (plural, masc./fem.); um, uma "a(n)" (singular, masc./fem.), uns, umas "some" (plural, masc./fem.), dois, duas "two" (plural, masc./fem.).

In the Finnish sentence Yöt ovat pimeitä "Nights are dark", each word referring to the plural noun yöt "nights" ("night" = yö) is pluralized (night-PL is-PL dark-PL-partitive).

=== Exceptions ===
Sometimes, grammatical number will not represent the actual quantity, a form-meaning mismatch. For example, in Ancient Greek neuter plurals took a singular verb. The plural form of a pronoun may also be applied to a single individual as a sign of importance, respect or generality, as in the pluralis majestatis, the T–V distinction, and the generic "you", found in many languages, or, in English, when using the singular "they" for gender-neutrality.

In Arabic, the plural of a non-human noun (one that refers to an animal or to an inanimate entity regardless of whether the noun is grammatically masculine or feminine in the singular) is treated as feminine singular—this is called the inanimate plural. For example:

- رجل جميل (rajul jamīl) 'beautiful/handsome man': rajul (man) is masculine singular, so it takes the masculine singular adjective jamīl.
- بيت جميل (bayt jamīl) 'beautiful house': bayt (house) is masculine singular, so it takes the masculine singular jamīl.
- كلب جميل (kalb jamīl) 'beautiful dog': kalb (dog) is masculine singular, so it takes the masculine singular jamīl.
- بنت جميلة (bint jamīlah) 'beautiful girl': bint is feminine singular, so it takes the feminine singular jamīlah.
- سيارة جميلة (sayyārah jamīlah) 'beautiful car': sayyārah is feminine singular, so it takes the feminine singular jamīlah.
- رجال جميلون (rijāl jamīlūn) 'beautiful/handsome men': rijāl (men) is masculine plural, so it takes the masculine plural jamīlūn.
- بنات جميلات (banāt jamīlāt) 'beautiful girls': banāt is feminine plural, so it takes the feminine plural jamīlāt.

but

- بيوت جميلة (buyūt jamīlah) 'beautiful houses': buyūt (houses) is non-human plural, and so takes the inanimate plural (feminine singular) jamīlah.
- سيارات جميلة (sayyārāt jamīlah) 'beautiful cars': sayyārāt is non-human plural, and so takes the inanimate plural jamīlah.
- كلاب جميلة (kilāb jamīlah) 'beautiful dogs': kilāb is non-human plural, and so takes the inanimate plural jamīlah.

=== Collective nouns ===
A collective noun is a word that designates a group of objects or beings regarded as a whole, such as "flock", "team", or "corporation". Although many languages treat collective nouns as singular, in others they may be interpreted as plural. In British English, phrases such as the committee are meeting are common (the so-called agreement in sensu "in meaning"; with the meaning of a noun, rather than with its form, see constructio ad sensum). The use of this type of construction varies with dialect and level of formality.

In some cases, the number marking on a verb with a collective subject may express the degree of collectivity of action:

- The committee are discussing the matter (the individual members are discussing the matter), but the committee has decided on the matter (the committee has acted as an indivisible body).
- The crowd is tearing down the fences (a crowd is doing something as a unit), but the crowd are cheering wildly (many individual members of the crowd are doing the same thing independently of each other).

== Semantic versus grammatical number ==
All languages are able to specify the quantity of referents. They may do so by lexical means with words such as English a few, some, one, two, five hundred. However, not every language has a grammatical category of number. Grammatical number is expressed by morphological or syntactic means. That is, it is indicated by certain grammatical elements, such as through affixes or number words. Grammatical number may be thought of as the indication of semantic number through grammar.

Languages that express quantity only by lexical means lack a grammatical category of number. For instance, in Khmer, neither nouns nor verbs carry any grammatical information concerning number: such information can only be conveyed by lexical items such as khlah 'some', pii-bey 'a few', and so on.

== See also ==
- Count noun
- Elohim
- Generic antecedent
- Grammatical agreement
- Grammatical conjugation
- Grammatical person
- Inflection
- Measure word
- Names of numbers in English
- Noun class
- Plurale tantum
- Romance plurals
