= Porome language =

Language isolate of Papua New Guinea

Porome
- Kibiri
- Native to: Papua New Guinea
- Region: Gulf Province, Kikori District, near Aird Hills, on several tributaries of Kikori River, villages of Tipeowo, Doibo, Paile, Babaguina, Ero, and Wowa in southern Papua New Guinea
- Native speakers: 1,200 (2011)
- Language family: language isolate ?
- Dialects: Porome; Kibiri

Language codes
- ISO 639-3: prm
- Glottolog: kibi1239
- ELP: Kibiri-Porome
- Map: The Porome language of New Guinea The Porome language (large bay, southern PNG) Trans–New Guinea languages Other Papuan languages Austronesian languages Uninhabited
- Coordinates: 7°27′S 144°17′E

Porome, also known as Kibiri, is a Papuan language of southern Papua New Guinea.

== Classification ==
Porome was classified as a language isolate by Stephen Wurm. Although Malcolm Ross linked it to the Kiwaian languages, there is no evidence for a connection apart from the pronouns 1sg amo and 2sg do (cf. proto-Kiwaian *mo and *oro).

== Distribution ==
There are over a thousand speakers in Babaguina (7.480977°S 144.254009°E), Doibo (7.45766°S 144.271731°E), Ero (7.446131°S 144.364831°E), Paile, Tipeowo, and Wowa (7.414287°S 144.315579°E) villages in West Kikori Rural LLG and East Kikori Rural LLG of Gulf Province, near the Aird Hills and Kikori River tributaries.

== Phonology ==
Porome has 9 native consonants. /s/ occurs in loanwords. There are no glottal consonants.

p	t	k~g~ɣ
b	d	
v		
m	n	
	r	
	(s)	

There are five vowels, which are /a, e, i, o, u/.

Like the surrounding languages, Porome is a tonal language. It has 5 tones.

- High-level: kóí ‘cloth’
- Low-level: kòì ‘selfish’
- Rising: mèrí ‘road’
- Falling: mérì ‘pandanus’
- Peaking: pàkúmì ‘feather’

== Pronouns ==
The independent pronouns and subject suffixes to the verb are as follows:

	sg	du	pl
1	amo, -me	amó-kai	amó, -ke/-ki
2	do, -ke	aia-kai	a, -ka
3	da, -a/-bV	abo-kai	abo, -abo

== Vocabulary ==
Selected Porome vocabulary from Petterson (2010):

=== Body parts ===
Porome	Gloss
kikimi	head
kikimikuro	hair
pakai	forehead
ipiri kukuro	eyebrow, eyelashes
ipiri	eye
obokera	ear
urubi	nose
koropi	tooth
beri	tongue
kakimoro	cheek
iri	hand
kaka	thumb
iri uraka	palm
upuruburowara	back
itari	back of neck (nape)
eimuro	breast
bamakai	chest
bakuri	belly
koupuri	shoulder
kunei	thigh
murikara	knee
warakero	leg
kakapu	foot

=== Numerals ===
Porome	Gloss
tauri	0
wakua	1
kabirai	2
wauteri	3
kaka etekaro	4
irikia wakua	5
irikia wakua, muro wakua	6
irikia wakua, muro kabirai	7
irikia wakua, muro wauteri	8
irikia wakua, muro kaka etekaro	9
irikia kabirai	10

=== Village and society ===
Porome	Gloss
kuri	village
mapi	house
erei	fire
kumapi	stone
wawari	creek
meri	path
penoni	bridge
moia	men
eria	women
kari	boys
mibu	girls

=== Nature and environment ===
Porome	Gloss
bari naka	sky
eri ipiro	sun
omeri tero	moon
okoiri	star
keibu	waves
momoi	clouds
bari epu	rain clouds
kakaikapo, neii	rain
meremeri	lightning
marari, konobori	wind
ero	land
eii	earth, soil
ubi	water
kaku	river
eimuro	bush
erouri	island
moki	passage
pari	sand
oteri	cliff
akaburi	mountain

=== Plants ===
Porome	Gloss
kubi	tree
aveiri	branch
kuri	roots
orei	leaf
kopo	flower
enenei	grass
avui	cutty grass
makai	betelnut
dii	coconut
mei	sugarcane

=== Animals ===
Porome	Gloss
bobi	pig
kumi	dog
bari mei kumo	chicken
kaburi	frog
barami	wallaby
pusi	cat
kuiou	tree kangaroo
kaiani, keipari	rat
imai	snake
boribi	cuscus
tumaru	bandicoot
kana	bird-of-paradise
koropeiri	cassowary
wamo	bush fowl
kubeiri	flying fox
kapasikori	black cockatoo
marubo	hornbill
koribi	fish
einakerei	centipede
eiamu	millipede
morokabi	spider
ubatu	grasshopper
nepu, mati	mosquito
nokoiri	fly
enene	cicada
bebeiri	butterfly
aii	sago grub
buburumi	sago beetle
mirimabi	scorpion
mi	crab
timuri	prawn
vi	cockle, clam
keimu	crocodile
akouri	river snake
dabeouri	sea turtle
ketoko	creek turtle
watemu	river turtle

== Comparison ==
Lexical comparison of Porome with neighboring languages:

gloss	Porome (isolate)	Urama (Kiwaian)	Rumu (Turama–Kikorian)	Ipiko (Anim)	Folopa (Teberan)	Baimuru (isolate)
head	kikimi / kikima	epu	wotu	abe	topo	uku
eye	ipiri / ipiro	idomai	ihi	uhino	kele	inamu
house	mapi / mapiro	moto	mi / ve	aho	be	marea
village	kuri / kuro	vati	yɔ / ve	vati	be	paʔiri
place	dabu / dabo	vati	tei	vati	tiki	paʔiri
tree	kubi / kubo	nuʔa	i	de	ni	iri
fire	erei / eria	era	i	tae	si	iʔau
dog	kumi / kumo	umu	ka	gaha	haɔ	oroko
bird	kumi / kumo	kikio	ka	tipemu	ba	nako
water	ubi / uburo	obo	u	ogo	węi	ere
earth	ei / ero	hepu	pɛkɛ / hapu	goʔeto	hae	kae
base	makiri / makiro	mabu	mate	kama	baale	ʔaia
sago	i / iro	du	kɛi	du	o	pu
1s pronoun	ámò	mo	i / na	no	e̜	na
2s pronoun	do	ro	iki / ka	vo (< ɣo)	ya̜	ni
3s pronoun	da	nu	a	ete / itu / eto	a̜	u
1p pronoun	àmò	nimo	name	ni	da̜	ene
2p pronoun	a	rio	kame	ho	dia̜	noro
3p pronoun	abo	ni	ame	iti	atima	oro

Comparison of Porome's phonological inventory with those of neighboring languages:

language	no. of consonants	no. of vowels	/h/	/ʔ/
Porome	9	5		
Baimuru	7	5		check
Rumu	8	7	check	
Kope	10	5	check	check
Urama	12	5	check	check
Kerewo	13	5	check	check
