= List of islands in Oceania by area =

This is a list of islands in Oceania by area. It includes all islands in Oceania greater than 10 km^{2} (3.9 sq mi), sorted in descending order by area. No Indonesian islands outside the provinces of Western New Guinea or any other island of the Malay Archipelago are included. For comparison, mainland Australia is also shown.

== List of islands ==
=== Islands 1,000 km^{2} (390 sq mi) and greater ===
Rank	Island name	Area (km^{2})	Area (sq mi)	Country or territory
1	Mainland Australia (Note: Australia is more than three times the size of Greenland, the largest island. Australia is sometimes dubbed "The Island Continent" or "Earth's largest island but smallest continent".)	7,595,342	2,932,578	Australia
2	New Guinea	785,753	303,381	Indonesia (Papua and West Papua) and Papua New Guinea
3	South Island	145,836	56,308	New Zealand
4	North Island	111,583	43,082	New Zealand
5	Tasmania	65,022	25,105	Australia (Tasmania)
6	New Britain	35,145	13,570	Papua New Guinea (West and East New Britain provinces)
7	New Caledonia (Grande Terre)	16,648	6,428	New Caledonia, special collectivity of France
8	Yos Sudarso (Dolak)	11,742	4,534	Indonesia (Papua)
9	Hawaiʻi (Big Island)	10,434	4,029	Hawaii, state of the United States
10	Viti Levu	10,388	4,011	Fiji
11	Bougainville	9,318	3,598	Papua New Guinea (Autonomous Region of Bougainville)
12	New Ireland (Latangai)	7,405	2,859	Papua New Guinea (New Ireland Province)
13	Melville	5,765	2,226	Australia (Northern Territory)
14	Vanua Levu	5,587	2,157	Fiji
15	Guadalcanal	5,353	2,067	Solomon Islands (Guadalcanal Province and Capital Territory)
16	Kangaroo	4,374	1,689	Australia (South Australia)
17	Espiritu Santo	3,956	1,527	Vanuatu (Sanma Province)
18	Malaita	3,836	1,481	Solomon Islands (Malaita Province)
19	Santa Isabel	3,665	1,415	Solomon Islands (Isabel Province)
20	Makira (San Cristóbal)	3,190	1,230	Solomon Islands (Makira-Ulawa Province)
21	Waigeo	3,060	1,180	Indonesia (West Papua)
22	Choiseul	2,971	1,147	Solomon Islands (Choiseul Province)
23	Groote Eylandt	2,285	882	Australia (Northern Territory)
24	Yapen	2,278	880	Indonesia (Papua)
25	Malakula	2,041	788	Vanuatu (Malampa Province)
26	New Georgia	2,037	786	Solomon Islands (Western Province)
27	Misool	2,034	785	Indonesia (West Papua)
28	Manus	1,940	750	Papua New Guinea (Manus Province)
29	Biak	1,904	735	Indonesia (Papua)
30	Maui	1,903	735	Hawaii, state of the United States
31	K'gari	1,840	710	Australia (Queensland) (world's largest sand island)
32	Stewart (Rakiura)	1,815	701	New Zealand (Southland Region)
33	Savaiʻi	1,718	663	Samoa
34	Bathurst	1,692	653	Australia (Northern Territory)
35	Salawati	1,623	627	Indonesia (West Papua)
36	Oʻahu	1,583	611	Hawaii, state of the United States
37	Fergusson	1,437	555	Papua New Guinea (Milne Bay Province)
38	Kauaʻi	1,435	554	Hawaii, state of the United States
39	Flinders	1,330	510	Australia (Tasmania)
40	New Hanover (Lavongai)	1,227	474	Papua New Guinea (New Ireland Province)
41	Lifou	1,146	442	New Caledonia, special collectivity of France
42	Upolu	1,125	434	Samoa
43	King	1,121	433	Australia (Tasmania)
44	Tahiti	1,069	413	French Polynesia, overseas collectivity of France
45	Normanby	1,040	400	Papua New Guinea (Milne Bay Province)
46	Mornington	1,002	387	Australia (Queensland)

=== Islands 100–999 km^{2} (39–386 sq mi) ===
Rank	Island name	Area (km^{2})	Area (sq mi)	Country or territory
47	Umboi	930	360	Papua New Guinea (Morobe Province)
48	Chatham (Wharekauri, Rekohu)	920	360	New Zealand
49	Efate	899.5	347.3	Vanuatu (Shefa Province)
50	Erromango	891.9	344.4	Vanuatu (Tafea Province)
51	Woodlark	874	337	Papua New Guinea (Milne Bay Province)
52	Tagula (Vanatinai)	866	334	Papua New Guinea (Milne Bay Province)
53	Komoran	695	268	Indonesia (Papua)
54	Kolombangara	687.8	265.6	Solomon Islands (Western Province)
55	Goodenough	687	265	Papua New Guinea (Milne Bay Province)
56	Buka	682	263	Papua New Guinea (Autonomous Region of Bougainville)
57	Ambryn	677.7	261.7	Vanuatu (Malampa Province)
58	Molokaʻi	670	260	Hawaii, state of the United States
59	Rennell (Mugaba)	660.1	254.9	Solomon Islands (Rennell and Bellona Province)
60	Supiory	659	254	Indonesia (Papua)
61	Maré	641.7	247.8	New Caledonia, special collectivity of France
62	Vella Lavella	628.9	242.8	Solomon Islands (Western Province)
63	Dirk Hartog	620	240	Australia (Western Australia)
64	Tanna	550	210	Vanuatu (Tafea Province)
65	Guam	540	210	Guam, an unincorporated territory of the United States
66	Vangunu	509	197	Solomon Islands (Western Province)
67	Nendö	505.5	195.2	Solomon Islands (Temotu Province)
68	Pentecost	490	190	Vanuatu (Penama Province)
69	South Malaita (Maramasike)	480	190	Solomon Islands (Malaita Province)
70	Cape Barren	478.4	184.7	Australia (Tasmania)
71	Batanta	453	175	Indonesia (West Papua)
72	Epi	444	171	Vanuatu (Shefa Province)
73	Auckland (Motu Maha)	442.5	170.9	New Zealand
74	Taveuni	434	168	Fiji
75	Rendova	411.3	158.8	Solomon Islands (Western Province)
76	Mussau	414	160	Papua New Guinea (New Ireland Province)
77	Kadavu	411	159	Fiji
78	Ambae	398	154	Vanuatu (Penama Province)
79	Kiritimati	388.39	149.96	Kiribati (largest atoll of Oceania)
80	Lānaʻi	363.9	140.5	Hawaii, state of the United States
81	Bruny	362	140	Australia (Tasmania)
82	Karkar	362	140	Papua New Guinea (Madang Province)
83	Kiwai	359.1	138.6	Papua New Guinea (Western Province)
84	Long Island	357	138	Papua New Guinea (Madang Province)
85	Gaua	342	132	Vanuatu (Torba Province)
86	Nuku Hiva	339	131	French Polynesia, overseas collectivity of France
87	Numfor	335	129	Indonesia (Papua)
88	Pohnpei	334	129	Federated States of Micronesia
89	Babeldaob	331	128	Palau
90	Hiva Oa	316	122	French Polynesia, overseas collectivity of France
91	Vanua Lava	314	121	Vanuatu (Torba Province)
92	Kiriwina	290.5	112.2	Papua New Guinea (Milne Bay Province)
93	Great Barrier (Aotea)	285	110	New Zealand (Auckland Region)
94	Maewo	269	104	Vanuatu (Penama Province)
95	Niue	261.46	100.95	Niue, state in free association with New Zealand
96	Tongatapu	260.48	100.57	Tonga
97	Rossel (Yela)	260	100	Papua New Guinea (Milne Bay Province)
98	Nggela Sule	ca. 230	89	Solomon Islands (Central Province)
99	Tabar	218	84	Papua New Guinea (New Ireland Province)
100	Misima	215	83	Papua New Guinea (Milne Bay Province)
100	Bickerton Island	215	83	Australia (Northern Territory)
101	Resolution	208.87	80.65	New Zealand (Fiordland)
102	Lihir (Niolam)	205	79	Papua New Guinea (New Ireland Province)
103	Purutu	186	72	Papua New Guinea (Western Province)
104	San Jorge	184	71	Solomon Islands (Isabel Province)
105	Niʻihau	180	69	Hawaii, state of the United States
106	Malo	180	69	Vanuatu (Sanma Province)
107	Vanikoro	173.2	66.9	Solomon Islands (Temotu Province)
108	Raiatea	167.7	64.7	French Polynesia, overseas collectivity of France
109	Rapa Nui	163.6	63.2	Chile
110	Aneityum	159.2	61.5	Vanuatu (Tafea Province)
111	Isle of Pines	152.3	58.8	New Caledonia, special collectivity of France
112	D'Urville (Rangitoto Ki Te Tonga)	150	58	New Zealand (Marlborough Region)
113	Kofiau	150	58	Indonesia (West Papua)
114	Nggela Pile	ca. 150	58	Solomon Islands (Central Province)
115	Ranongga	147	57	Solomon Islands (Western Province)
116	Tutuila	142.3	54.9	American Samoa, unincorporated territory of the United States
117	Gau	136.1	52.5	Fiji
118	Moorea	134	52	French Polynesia, overseas collectivity of France
119	Ouvéa	132.1	51.0	New Caledonia, special collectivity of France
120	Pavuvu	129.19	49.88	Solomon Islands (Central Province)
121	Macquarie	128	49	Australia (Tasmania)
122	Tatau	124.73	48.16	Papua New Guinea (New Ireland Province)
123	Tetepare	118	46	Solomon Islands (Western Province)
124	Kahoʻolawe	115.5	44.6	Hawaii, state of the United States
125	Maria	115.5	44.6	Australia (Tasmania)
126	Saipan	115.4	44.6	Northern Mariana Islands, unincorporated territory of the United States
127	Campbell (Motu Ihupuku)	115	44	New Zealand
128	Kosrae	111.3	43.0	Federated States of Micronesia
129	Wagina (Vaghena)	110	42	Vanuatu (Choiseul Province)
130	Wabuda	109	42	Papua New Guinea (Western Province)
131	Ovalau	106.4	41.1	Fiji
132	Ua Pou	106	41	French Polynesia, overseas collectivity of France
133	Basilaki	106	41	Papua New Guinea (Milne Bay Province)
134	Koro	105	41	Fiji
135	Sideia	101.3	40	Papua New Guinea (Milne Bay Province)
136	Tinian	101.01	39.00	Northern Mariana Islands, unincorporated territory of the United States
137	Adams	100	39	New Zealand (Auckland Islands)

== Islands under 100 km² ==
Rank	Island name	Area (km²)	Area (sq mi)	Country or territory
—	'Utu Vava'u	97	37	Tonga
—	Waiheke Island	92	36	New Zealand (Auckland Region)
—	Futuna Island	80	31	France (Wallis and Futuna)
—	Wallis Island	77.5	29.9	France (Wallis and Futuna)
—	Rarotonga	67.39	26.02	Cook Islands
—	Mangaia	51.8	20	Cook Islands
—	Malden Island	39.3	15.2	Kiribati
—	Tabiteuea	38	14.7	Kiribati
—	Henderson Island	37.3	14.4	Pitcairn Islands (UK)
—	Norfolk Island	34.6	13.4	Australia (External territory)
—	Tabuaeran	33.7	13	Kiribati
—	Alofi Island	32	12.3	France (Wallis and Futuna)
—	Tarawa	31.9	12.3	Kiribati
—	Raoul Island	29.4	11.4	New Zealand (Kermadec Islands)
—	Nonouti	29.2	11.3	Kiribati
—	Abemama	27.8	10.7	Kiribati
—	Atiu	26.9	10.4	Cook Islands
—	Mitiaro	22.25	8.59	Cook Islands
—	Nauru	21	8.1	Nauru
—	Aitutaki	18.05	6.97	Cook Islands
—	Nikunau	18.2	7	Kiribati
—	Abaiang	16	6.2	Kiribati
—	Maiana	15.9	6.1	Kiribati
—	Aranuka	15.5	6	Kiribati
—	Beru	14.7	5.7	Kiribati
—	Starbuck Island	16.2	6.3	Kiribati
—	Teraina	14.2	5.5	Kiribati
—	Butaritari	13.6	5.2	Kiribati
—	Marakei	13.5	5.2	Kiribati
—	Onotoa	13.5	5.2	Kiribati
—	Kuria	12.7	4.9	Kiribati
—	Arorae	9.5	3.7	Kiribati
—	Canton Island	9.1	3.5	Kiribati
—	Makin	6.7	2.6	Kiribati
—	Banaba	6	2.3	Kiribati
—	Enderbury Island	5.1	2	Kiribati
—	Tamana	4.7	1.8	Kiribati
—	Nukunonu	4.7	1.8	Tokelau (New Zealand)
—	Pitcairn Island	4.6	1.8	Pitcairn Islands (UK)
—	Manra Island	4.4	1.7	Kiribati
—	Nikumaroro	4.1	1.6	Kiribati
—	Fakaofo	4	1.5	Tokelau (New Zealand)
—	Orona	3.9	1.5	Kiribati
—	Millennium Island	3.76	1.45	Kiribati
—	Atafu	3.5	1.4	Tokelau (New Zealand)
—	Flint Island	3.2	1.2	Kiribati
—	Manono	3	1.2	Samoa
—	Nu'utele	1.08	0.44	Samoa
—	Apolima	1	0.39	Samoa
—	Nu'ulopa	1	0.01	Samoa
—	McKean Island	0.57	0.22	Kiribati
—	Rawaki Island	0.5	0.19	Kiribati
—	Vostok Island	0.24	0.09	Kiribati
—	Burnie Island	0.2	0.08	Kiribati

== See also ==
- List of countries and dependencies by area
- List of islands (by continent and country)
- List of islands by highest point
- List of islands by name
- List of islands by population
- List of islands by population density
- List of countries by largest island
