= Kiwai =

Kiwai may refer to:

- Kiwai, Pakistan, a populated place and administrative unit in northern Pakistan
- Kiwai Island, an island in Papua New Guinea
  - Kiwai Rural LLG, an administrative unit
- Kiwai language, a language of Papua New Guinea
