= Wabuda Island =

Island in Papua New Guinea

Coordinates: 8°23′S 143°37′E

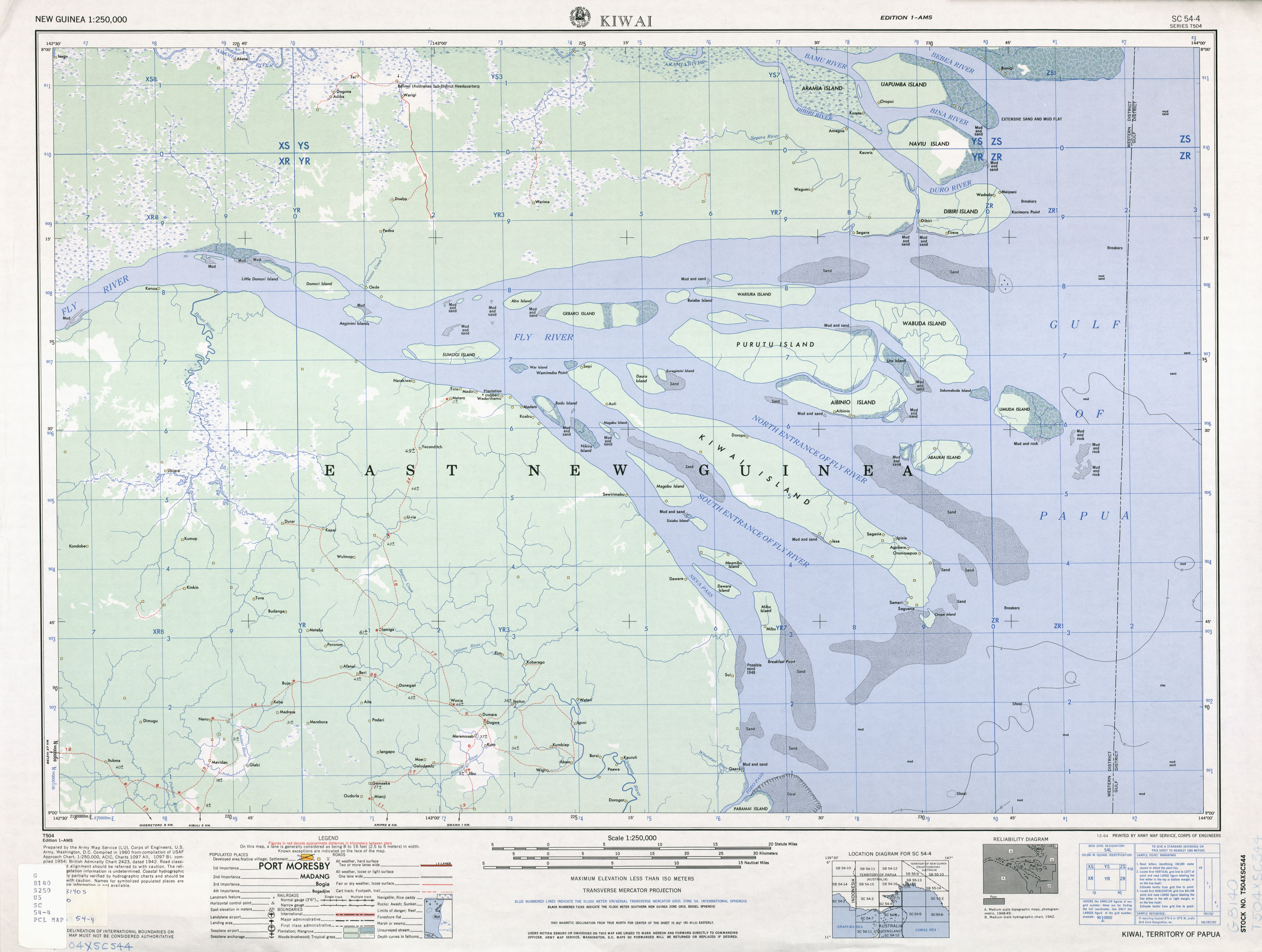
Map of Fly River Delta where Wabuda Island belong

Wabuda Island is the third largest island in the Fly River delta, Papua New Guinea, after Kiwai Island and Purutu Island. Its area is 109 km^{2} (42 sq mi).

Administratively, the island belongs to Kiwai Rural LLG in South Fly District of Western Province.

== See also ==
- Waboda language
