= Hiwi language =

Hiwi may refer to the following languages:

- Guahibo language, a Guahiban language of Colombia and Venezuela
- Waia language, a Trans-Fly language of Papua New Guinea
- Waboda language, a Trans–New-Guinea language spoken in the Fly River delta, Papua New Guinea
