= Kope language =

Kope may refer to:

- Patwin language or Patween, a critically endangered Wintuan language of Northern California, with two or three dialects
- Northeast Kiwai language, a Papuan language (or languages) of southern Papua New Guinea, with several dialects
