= KMX (disambiguation) =

KMX is the stock ticker for CarMax, an American used car retailer company.

KMX or kmx can also refer to:

- King Khalid Air Base, in Saudi Arabia
- Waboda language, Kiwaian language spoken in Papua New Guinea
- WKMX, contemporary hit radio station in Enterprise, Alabama, U.S.
