= Hiwi =

Hiwi refer to:

- Hiwi (volunteer), POWs of occupied nations who volunteered to help the Nazis
- Hiwi al-Balkhi, 9th century exegete and critic of Bible
- Hiwi people, a people of Colombia and Venezuela
- Guahibo language, the Cuahiban language spoken by them
- Waia language, a Trans-Fly language of Papua New Guinea
- Waboda language, a Trans–New-Guinea language spoken in the Fly River delta, Papua New Guinea
