= Morigi language =

Papuan language of Papua New Guinea

Morigi
- Native to: Papua New Guinea
- Region: Turama River region, Gulf Province
- Native speakers: (700 cited 1975)
- Language family: Kiwaian: Morigi

Language codes
- ISO 639-3: mdb
- Glottolog: mori1271

Morigi is a Papuan language of southern Papua New Guinea.
