= Foia Foia language =

Papuan language of Papua New Guinea

Foia Foia
- Minanibai
- Native to: Papua New Guinea
- Native speakers: (180 cited 2000 census); 300 Minanibai reported 1980
- Language family: Trans–New Guinea: Fly River (Anim); Inland Gulf; Foia Foia
- Dialects: Mahigi †

Language codes
- ISO 639-3: Either: ffi – Foia Foia mcv – Minanibai
- Glottolog: mina1274 Minanibai mahi1249 Mahigi

Foia Foia (Foyafoya), or Minanibai, is a Papuan language of Papua New Guinea, spoken in an area near the Omati River mouth in Ikobi Kairi and Goaribari Census districts (Gulf Province).

Mahigi, a Foia Foia dialect documented in a word list by Cridland (1924), is now extinct.

== Locations ==
Foia Foia is spoken in Bibisa village (7.666925°S 143.177088°E), Bamu Rural LLG, Western Province, Papua New Guinea, and in Moka (7.282409°S 143.461072°E) and Pepeha (7.655742°S 144.007263°E) villages of West Kikori Rural LLG, Gulf Province.

== Phonology ==
=== Vowels ===
	Front	Central	Back
Close	i		u
Mid	e		o
Open		ä ⟨ā⟩	ɑ ⟨a⟩

=== Consonants ===
		Labial	Labiodental	Alveolar	Velar	Glottal
Stop	voiceless	p		t	k	ʔ ⟨ʼ⟩
Stop	voiced	b		d	g	
Fricative		ɸ ⟨f⟩	f	s		h
Approximant		w		l		

== Bibliography ==
Word lists

- Carr, Philip J. 1991 Foyafoya (Bibisa, W.P. at Kamusi), Hoyahoya (Matakaia, W.P. at Gagoro), Hoyahoya/Hoiahoia (Ukusi-Koperami, W.P. two young men visiting Torobina). Manuscript.
- Z’graggen, John A. 1975. Comparative wordlists of the Gulf District and adjacent Areas. In: Richard Loving (ed.), Comparative Wordlists I. 5–116. Ukarumpa: SIL-PNG. (Rearranged version of Franklin ed. 1973: 541–592) with typographical errors.)
- Franklin, Karl J. 1973. Appendices. In: Franklin (ed.), 539–592.
- Johnston, H. L. C. 1920. Vocabulary of Eme-Eme. British New Guinea Annual Report 1919–1920: 120.
