= Kiwaian languages =

Language family of New Guinea

Kiwaian
- Geographic distribution: Papua New Guinea
- Linguistic classification: a primary language family

Language codes
- Glottolog: kiwa1251
- Map: The Kiwaian languages of New Guinea The Kiwaian languages Trans–New Guinea languages Other Papuan languages Austronesian languages Uninhabited

The Kiwaian languages form a language family of New Guinea. They are a dialect cluster of half a dozen closely related languages. They are grammatically divergent from the Trans–New Guinea languages, and typically have singular, dual, trial, and plural pronouns.

== Classification ==
The Trans–New Guinea identity of Kiwaiian is supported by a relatively large number of basic lexical items. Ross (2005) tentatively linked Kiwaiian to the erstwhile language isolate Porome. However, the evidence is only two pronouns, and the connection has not been accepted by other researchers.

== Languages ==
- Kiwaian family: Kiwai, Bamu–Gama, Kerewo–Morigi, Waboda

Kiwaian languages and respective demographic information listed by Evans (2018) are provided below.

List of Kiwaian languages
Language	Location	Population	Alternate names
Southern Kiwai	Kiwai Rural LLG	20,000	Island Kiwai
Wabuda	Kiwai Rural LLG	2,750	
Bamu	south Bamu Rural LLG	6,310	
Northeast Kiwai	West Kikori Rural LLG	6,000	Urama
Kerewo	West Kikori Rural LLG	1,090	
Morigi	West Kikori Rural LLG	?	

== Proto-language ==
=== Phonemes ===
Usher (2020) reconstructs the consonant inventory as follows:

*m	*n		
*p	*t	*s	*k
*b	*d		*g
*w	*ɾ		

*i		*u
*e		*o
	*a	

=== Pronouns ===
Usher (2020) reconstructs the pronouns as,

	sg	pl
1	*mo	*nimo
2	*oɾo	*nigo
3	?	*nei

=== Basic vocabulary ===
Some lexical reconstructions by Usher (2020) are:

gloss	Proto-Kiwai
head/hair	*kepuɾu
hair/feather	*mus[ua]
ear	*gaɾe
eye	*idomaɾi
nose	*wodi
tooth	*ibo(-nVɾV)
tongue	*uototoɾo[p/b]e
leg/foot	*sakiɾo
blood	*kaɾima; *sa[w]i
bone	*soɾo
skin/bark	*tama
breast	*amo
louse	*nimo
dog	*[k]umu
bird	*wowogo
egg/fruit	*kikopu
tree	*nuk₂a; *kota
man/male	*dubu
woman	*oɾobo; *upi
sun/day	*saɾik₂i; *si[w]io
moon	*sagomi; *owe
water	*kobo
fire	*keɾa
stone	*(nok₂oɾa-)kopi
path	*gabo
name	*paini, *paina
eat/drink	*oɾuso (sg.), *iɾiso (pl.)
one	*nak[o/u]
two	*netoa

== Evolution ==
Kiwaian reflexes of proto-Trans-New Guinea (pTNG) etyma are:

Southern Kiwai language:

- magota ‘mouth’ < *maŋgat[a]
- amo ‘breast < *amu
- gare ‘ear’ < *kand(e,i)k(V]
- pitu ‘fingernail’ < *mb(i,u)t(i,u)[C]
- baba ‘father’ < *mbapa
- sagana ‘moon’ < *takVn[V]
- tuwo ‘ashes’ < *sumbu
- era ‘tree’ < *inda
- nimo ‘louse’ < *niman
- epuru ‘head’ < *kV(mb,p)utu
- kopu ‘short’ < *kutu(p,mb)a
- abida ‘sister’ < *pi(n,nd)a

Other languages:

- Waboda kepuru < *kV(mb,p)utu
- Kerewo bena ‘shoulder’ < *mbena ‘arm’
- Morigi kota ‘leg’ < *k(a,o)ndok[V]
- N.E. Kiwai modi ‘nose’ < *mundu
- Bamu kukamu ‘cold’ < *kukam(o,u)
