= Wakasihu language =

Austronesian language spoken in Maluku, Indonesia

Wakasihu
- Larike-Wakasihu
- Native to: Indonesia
- Region: Ambon Island, Maluku
- Native speakers: (13,000 cited 1987)
- Language family: Austronesian: Malayo-Polynesian (MP); Central–Eastern MP; Central Maluku ?; East Central Maluku; Seram ?; Nunusaku; Piru Bay; West; Hoamoal; Wakasihu
- Dialects: Allang; Wakasihu; Larike

Language codes
- ISO 639-3: alo
- Glottolog: lari1255

Wakasihu, or Larike-Wakasihu after the two still-vigorous dialects, is an Austronesian language of Ambon Island in the Maluku Islands.

== Phonology ==
Wakasihu consonants
		Labial	Alveolar	Palatal	Velar	Glottal
Plosive	voiceless	p	t	(tʃ)	k	ʔ
Plosive	voiced	(b)	d	(dʒ)	(ɡ)	
Nasal		m	n		(ŋ)	
Fricative			s			h
Tap			ɾ			
Lateral			l			
Approximant		w		j		

Phonemes in parentheses are borrowed from other languages.

Wakasihu vowels
	Front	Central	Back
Close	i		u
Mid	e		o
Open		a	

/i e a/ are heard as [ɪ ɛ ə] when in closed or stressed syllable position.
