= West Kikori Rural LLG =

Local-level government in Papua New Guinea

- Location within Papua New Guinea
- Coordinates: 7.414196°S 144.244806°E
- Country: Papua New Guinea
- Province: Gulf Province
- City: Kikori
- Time zone: UTC+10 (AEST)

West Kikori Rural LLG is a local-level government (LLG) of Gulf Province, Papua New Guinea. Kiwaian languages are spoken in the LLG.

== Wards ==
- 01. Haivaro
- 02. Moka (Minanibai language speakers)
- 03. Komaio
- 04. Masusu
- 05. Gibu
- 06. Ekeirau
- 07. Kibeni (Minanibai language speakers)
- 08. Omati-Gihiteri
- 09. Kaiam
- 10. Baina
- 11. Kemei
- 12. Dopima
- 13. Babaguina
- 14. Apeawa
- 15. Doibo
- 17. Kopi
- 82. Kikori Urban
