= Bamu language =

Papuan language of Papua New Guinea

Bamu
- Native to: Papua New Guinea
- Region: Bamu River
- Native speakers: (5,400; 6,300 with Gama cited 2000 census)
- Language family: Kiwaian: Bamu

Language codes
- ISO 639-3: bcf (with Gama)
- Glottolog: bamu1257

Bamu, or Bamu Kiwai, is a Papuan language of southern Papua New Guinea.

A thousand speakers of Gama are included in the ISO code for Bamu. However, Ethnologue notes that lexical similarity is below 80% with the most similar dialect of Bamu proper.

== Dialects ==
Dialects are:

- Gama
- Lower Bamu
- Sisiame (8.104866°S 143.570587°E)
- Upper Bamu (Middle Bamu)
- Nuhiro
