= Purutu Island =

Island in Papua New Guinea

Coordinates: 8°24′S 143°27′E

- Interactive map of Purutu Island

Geography
- Location: Fly River delta
- Area: 186 km^{2} (72 sq mi)

Administration
- Papua New Guinea
- Province: Western Province
- LLG: Kiwai Rural LLG

Purutu Island is the second largest island in the Fly River delta, Papua New Guinea, after Kiwai Island. Its area is 186 km^{2} (72 sq mi).

Administratively, the island belongs to Kiwai Rural LLG in South Fly District of Western Province.
