= Kiwai Island =

Island in Papua New Guinea

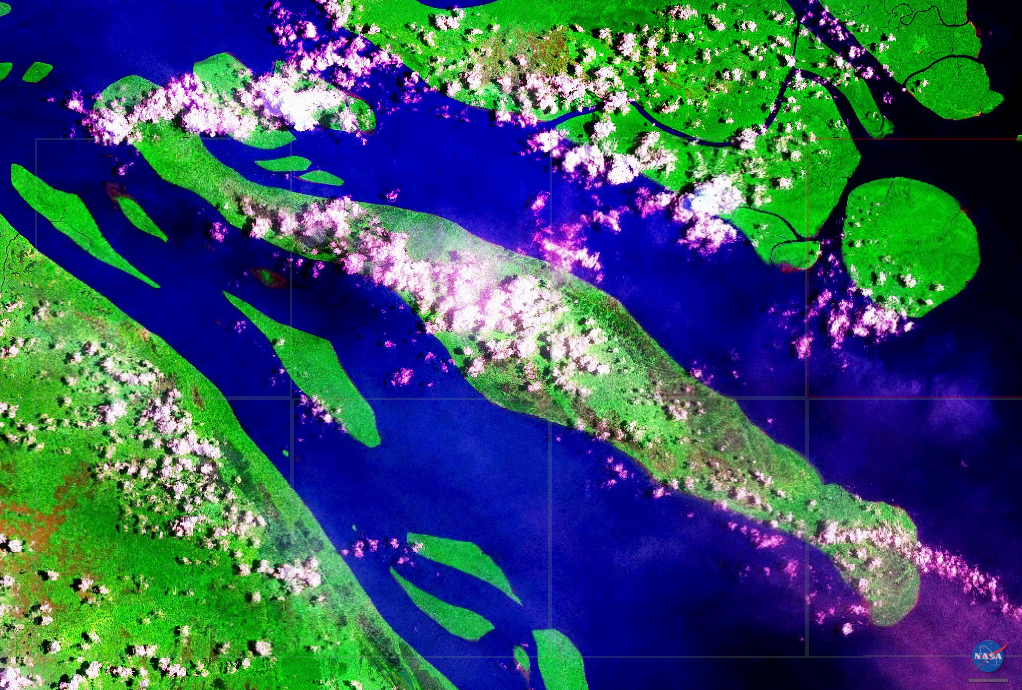
- NASA satellite image (Geocover 2000)
- Interactive map of Kiwai Island

Geography
- Location: Fly River delta
- Coordinates: 8°33′S 143°25′E
- Archipelago: Fly River Delta Islands
- Major islands: Kiwai, Purutu, Wabuda Island
- Area: 359.1 km^{2} (138.6 sq mi)
- Length: 59 km (36.7 mi)
- Width: 9 km (5.6 mi)
- Coastline: 135.3 km (84.07 mi)
- Highest point: unnamed

Administration
- Papua New Guinea
- Province: Western Province
- District: South Fly District
- LLG: Kiwai Rural
- Largest settlement: Iasa

Demographics
- Population: 2092 (2000)
- Ethnic groups: Kiwai

Kiwai Island is the largest island in the Fly River delta, Papua New Guinea. It is 59 km (37 mi) long along the northwest–southeast axis from Wamimuba Point in the northwest to the village of Saguane (Sanguane) in the south, and up to 9 km (5.6 mi) wide, with an average width of 5.6 km (3.5 mi). Its area is 359 km^{2} (139 sq mi). Neighboring Purutu and Wabuda Islands to the north and northeast are also among the three largest islands in the Fly River delta. A language study mentioned a population of about 4,500, but the census of population of 2000 showed only 2,092 inhabitants.

== Geography ==
The island separates the north and south entrances of the Fly River. It is well wooded and only a few feet above water. The chief village, Iasa, is located on the south side of the island. Sumai village is on the same side of the island and 24 km (15 mi) farther northwest. Doropo village is about midway along the north side of the island. At the east end of the island are other small villages, such as Sagasia, Ipisia, Agobara and Oromosapuo. Administratively, the island is part of Kiwai Rural LLG (Local Level Government area) of South Fly District, Western Province.

In tidal areas, vegetation consists almost exclusively of mangroves and nipa palms, but inland there are freshwater swamps and dry savannas. The average annual rainfall is about 200 centimeters most of which falls during the northwest monsoon from December to April, when it rains almost every day, and thunderstorms and high winds often occur. The inhabitants of the Fly River delta engage in agriculture and hunting. Coconut palm, breadfruit, plantain, sago palm, and sugar cane are grown.

== History ==
Archeologists have recovered some of the largest stone axes ever discovered and ethnographers believe that these axe heads were used as ceremonial grave markers. Anthropologists believe that most of these stone axes were imported from the Torres Strait Islands, as there is a lack of suitable tool stone in the region. An examination of twenty of these axes revealed that eighteen of them were composed of intrusive igneous rocks similar to the type found on the Torres Strait Islands. Ethnologists and archeologists both believe that the Kiwai Islanders and the Torres Strait Islanders had a symbiotic relationship involving the exchange of stone axes for large seafaring canoes.

The mouth of the Fly River was discovered by Europeans in 1842, and there was considerable contact between the Kiwai and Europeans during the second half of the nineteenth century. By 1910, many Kiwai men spoke Tok Pisin and had worked on pearl-shell boats in the Torres Strait and on plantations farther to the east on the southern coast of New Guinea. An anthropological study of the people of Kiwai Island was carried out by the Rev. James Chalmers, a London Missionary Society missionary. It was published after his death in 1901. He noted that the "males are tall and muscular, the women not good looking". At the time the men rarely hunted, except for wild pigs, using dogs to help with the hunting. They used single-outrigger canoes, most of which they obtained from the mainland and which they also traded with other islands. Fish were largely caught by trapping. Spears and bows and arrows were also used. Chalmers reported that food, both meat and vegetables, was roasted and when he took some cooking pots to the island there was little interest in using them. He explained that people lived in large, communal houses, with men sleeping in one main house and women in smaller houses. The land was swampy and deep channels had to be dug to drain the land before it could be planted with taros, yams, sweet potatoes and bananas. Chalmers also described the initiation practices for young men, which employed human effigies, as well as the burial practices. Young girls underwent scarification. Music was common, and the islanders used drums and other types of percussion, a form of harp (begube), and pan pipes.

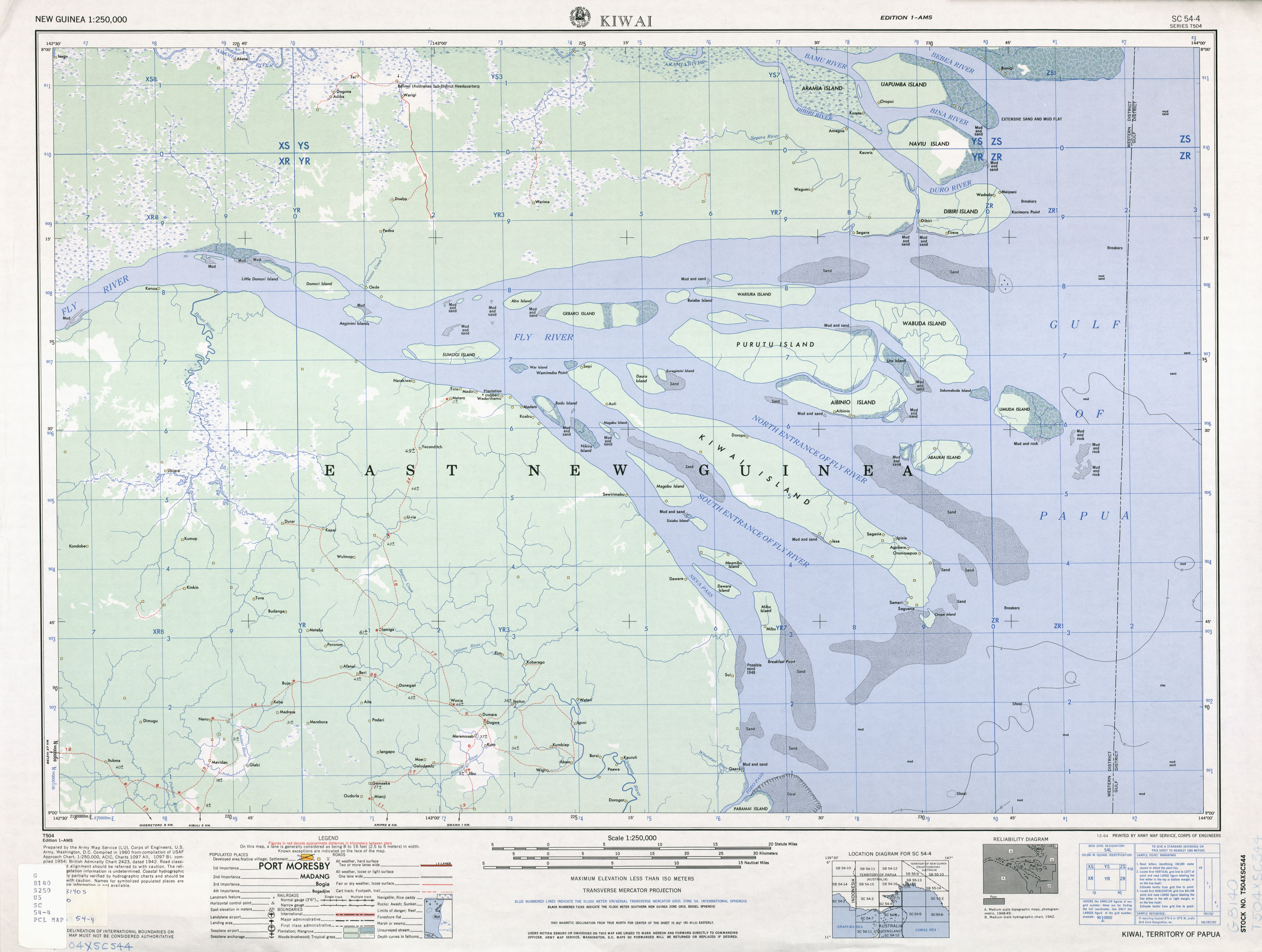
Map of Fly River Delta

== See also ==
- Kiwai language
- Kiwaian languages
- Kiwai Rural LLG
