= Kerewo language =

Kiwaian language spoken in Papua New Guinea

Kerewo
- Native to: Papua New Guinea
- Region: Omati River
- Native speakers: 1,090 in the local area (2011)
- Language family: Kiwaian: Kerewo

Language codes
- ISO 639-3: kxz
- Glottolog: kere1286

Kerewo or Kerewa is a Papuan language of southern Papua New Guinea.

Some portions of the Bible were translated into Kerewo. The Gospels of Matthew, Mark, Luke and John and the Epistles of Ephesians, Philippians and 1 John were translated as "Nouri buka nou'a airoa" and published in the Goaribari dialect of Kerewo in 1941.
