= Fly River =

River in Papua New Guinea

Fly
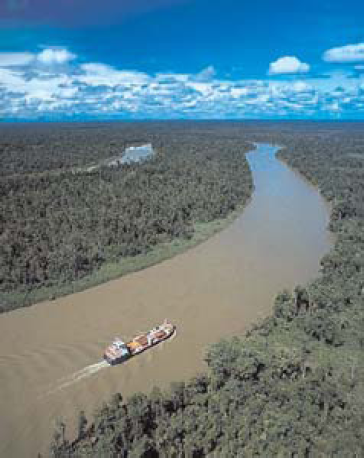
- Aerial view of the Fly River

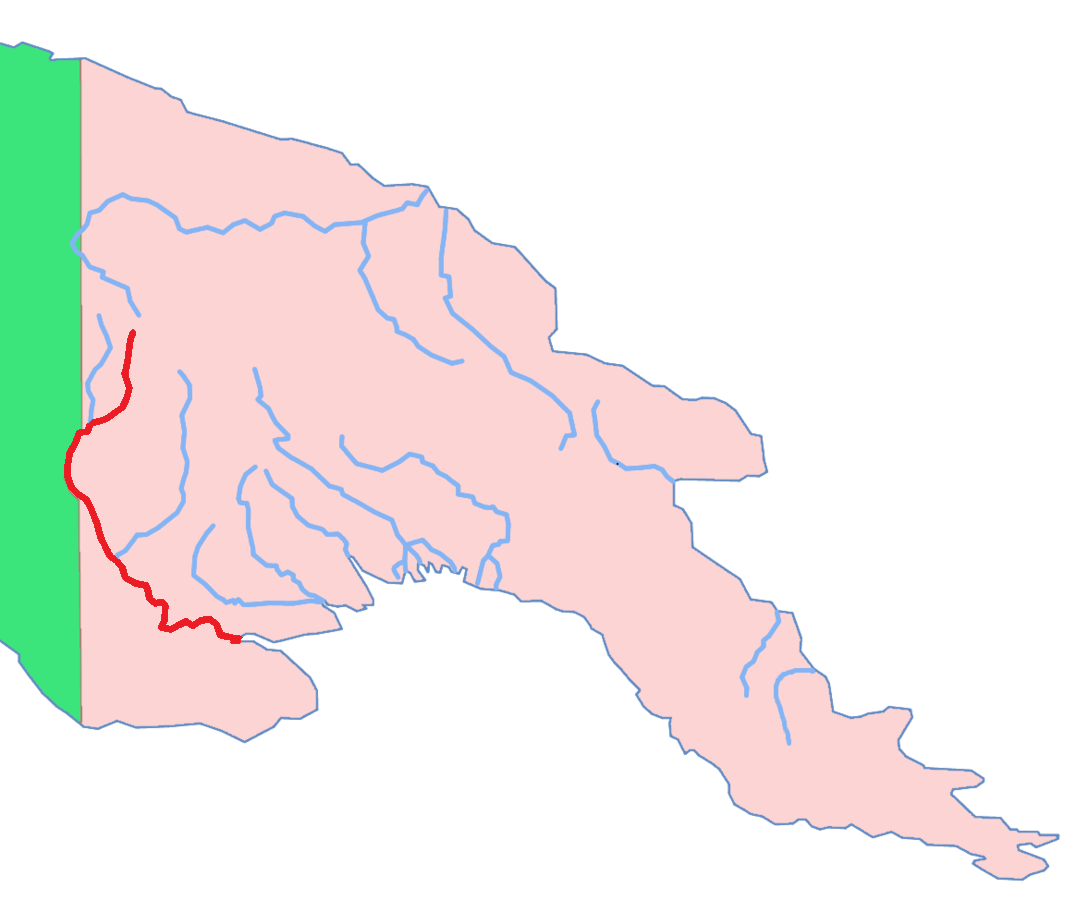
- Location of the Fly

Location
- Country: Papua New Guinea and Indonesia

Physical characteristics
- Source
  - location: Star Mountains, Papua New Guinea
  - coordinates: 5°32′15″S 141°53′16″E
  - elevation: 3,000 m (9,800 ft)
- Mouth: Gulf of Papua
  - location: Papua New Guinea
  - coordinates: 8°33′40″S 143°35′20″E
  - elevation: 0 ft (0 m)
- Length: 1,060 km (660 mi) Fly River; 1,224 km (761 mi) Fly-Strickland River System
- Basin size: 75,800 km^{2} (29,300 sq mi)
- Discharge
  - location: Fly Delta
  - average: 6,500 m^{3}/s (230,000 cu ft/s)
- Discharge
  - location: Ogwa
  - average: 6,000 m^{3}/s (210,000 cu ft/s)
- Discharge
  - location: Obo
  - average: 2,400 m^{3}/s (85,000 cu ft/s)
- Discharge
  - location: Kiunga
  - average: 1,110 m^{3}/s (39,000 cu ft/s)

Basin features
- Progression: Gulf of Papua
- River system: Fly River
- Tributaries
  - left: Palmer, Elevala, Binge, Agu, Strickland
  - right: Gu, Ok Tedi, Soru, Burei, Bituri

The Fly River is the third longest river on the island of New Guinea, after the Sepik and Mamberamo, with a total length of 1,060 km (660 mi). It is the largest by volume of discharge in Oceania, the largest in the world without a single dam in its catchment, and overall the 23rd-largest primary river in the world by discharge volume. It is located in the southwest of Papua New Guinea and in the South Papua province of Indonesia. It rises in the Victor Emanuel Range arm of the Star Mountains, and crosses the south-western lowlands before flowing into the Gulf of Papua in a large delta. The Fly–Strickland River system has a total length of 1,224 km (761 mi), making it the longest river system of an island in the world. The 824 km (512 mi) Strickland is the longest and largest tributary of Fly River, making it the furthest distance source of the Fly River.

== Description ==
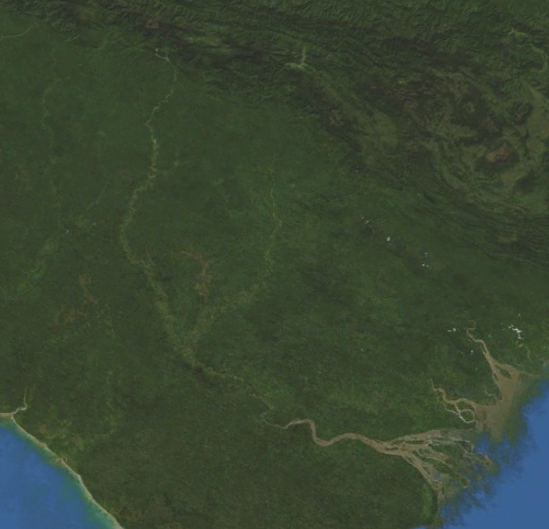
NASA blue marble satellite image of the Fly River

The Fly flows mostly through the Western Province of Papua New Guinea and for a small stretch, it forms the international boundary with Indonesia's western New Guinea. This section protrudes slightly to the west of the 141°E longitude line. To compensate for this gain in territory for Papua New Guinea, the border south of the Fly River is slightly east of the 141°E longitude line. As part of this deal, Indonesia has the right to use the Fly River to its mouth for navigation.

The principal tributaries of the Fly are the Strickland and the Ok Tedi.

Close to its mouth, the flow of the Fly River encounters a tidal bore, where an incoming high tide pushes water upstream until the tide changes. The range of this tidal bore is still undocumented.

== Discharge ==
Fly River at Ogwa (period: 1998–2024)
Year	Average discharge (m^{3}/s)
2024	8,482
2023	5,943
2022	6,522
2021	8,360
2020	6,772
2019	7,390
2018	8,436
2017	9,816
2016	8,078
2015	5,765
2014	6,634
2013	6,276
2012	7,806
2011	6,426
2010	6,114
2009	7,508
2008	7,504
2007	6,684
2006	6,909
2005	5,892
2004	4,426
2003	5,317
2002	5,671
2001	8,415
2000	9,241
1999	9,400
1998	7,374

Fly River average discharge at gauging stations
Year, period	Average discharge	Ref.
Estuary 8°33′57.1428″S 143°38′26.6892″E
1999–2003	7,000 m^{3}/s (250,000 cu ft/s)	
1993–1997	6,000 m^{3}/s (210,000 cu ft/s)	
1990–2003	6,500 m^{3}/s (230,000 cu ft/s)	
	7,500 m^{3}/s (260,000 cu ft/s)	
	5,670 m^{3}/s (200,000 cu ft/s)	
Ogwa 7°38′47.5008″S 141°21′8.5104″E
1998–2021	^{1}7,175 m^{3}/s (253,400 cu ft/s)	
1988–1993	6,000 m^{3}/s (210,000 cu ft/s)	
1992–1993	5,119 m^{3}/s (180,800 cu ft/s)	
1991–1992	4,927 m^{3}/s (174,000 cu ft/s)	
1990–1991	6,193 m^{3}/s (218,700 cu ft/s)	
1989–1990	6,482 m^{3}/s (228,900 cu ft/s)	
1988–1989	6,300 m^{3}/s (220,000 cu ft/s)	
	7,400 m^{3}/s (260,000 cu ft/s)	
Everill Junction 7°35′4.3188″S 141°23′12.7536″E
1993–1997	5,250 m^{3}/s (185,000 cu ft/s)	
	6,000 m^{3}/s (210,000 cu ft/s)	
Obo^{2} 7°35′14.5212″S 141°19′25.2228″E
1999–2003	3,067 m^{3}/s (108,300 cu ft/s)	
1993–1997	2,244 m^{3}/s (79,200 cu ft/s)	
1992–1993	2,515 m^{3}/s (88,800 cu ft/s)	
1991–1992	2,613 m^{3}/s (92,300 cu ft/s)	
1990–1991	2,424 m^{3}/s (85,600 cu ft/s)	
1989–1990	2,057 m^{3}/s (72,600 cu ft/s)	
1988–1989	1,978 m^{3}/s (69,900 cu ft/s)	
	2,400 m^{3}/s (85,000 cu ft/s)	
	2,800 m^{3}/s (99,000 cu ft/s)	
Kuambit^{3} 6°10′5.0088″S 141°6′56.034″E
1992–1993	2,061 m^{3}/s (72,800 cu ft/s)	
1991–1992	1,407 m^{3}/s (49,700 cu ft/s)	
1990–1991	2,094 m^{3}/s (73,900 cu ft/s)	
1989–1990	2,124 m^{3}/s (75,000 cu ft/s)	
1988–1989	2,400 m^{3}/s (85,000 cu ft/s)	
	1,820 m^{3}/s (64,000 cu ft/s)	
Kiunga^{4} 6°7′35.3316″S 141°17′48.732″E
1992–1993	941 m^{3}/s (33,200 cu ft/s)	
1991–1992	807 m^{3}/s (28,500 cu ft/s)	
1990–1991	1,044 m^{3}/s (36,900 cu ft/s)	
1989–1990	1,197 m^{3}/s (42,300 cu ft/s)	
1988–1989	1,435 m^{3}/s (50,700 cu ft/s)	
	1,110 m^{3}/s (39,000 cu ft/s)	
Notes:^{1} Minimum 2,201 m^{3}/s (2004/11/30), maximum 18,214 m^{3}/s (2024/06/30); ^{2} Minimum 300 m^{3}/s, maximum 3,500 m^{3}/s; ^{3} Minimum 120 m^{3}/s, maximum 3,340 m^{3}/s; ^{4} Minimum 57 m^{3}/s, maximum 1,950 m^{3}/s;

Sediment load:

Station	Sediment load (10^{6} t/year)
Ogwa	81.3–119
Obo	9.1–35
Kuambit	6.3–37
Kiunga	2.6–2.7

== Tributaries ==
The main tributaries from the mouth:

Left tributary	Right tributary	Length (km)	Basin size (km^{2})	Average discharge (m^{3}/s)
Fly		1,060	73,809.31	6,500
Lower Fly
Segera			457.9	41.4
	Bituri	80	2,110.1	78.8
	Burei		1,173.6	35.7
	Suki Creek (Soru)	60	1,279.2	47.1
Strickland		824	35,058.7	3,600
Middle Fly
	Tamu Creek		492	19.7
	Kai		435.4	22.3
Agu			1,305.6	81.9
Binge			584.4	53.4
	Ok Tedi	207	5,042.1	923
Upper Fly
Wai Dai			280.6	28.4
Elevala		100	1,859.4	196.1
Wok Luap (Palmer)		90	2,314.4	244.4
	Gu (Wai Mari)		319.9	45.7
Wok Feneng			387.5	43.8
	Wok Wunik		175.7	25.3

== Delta ==
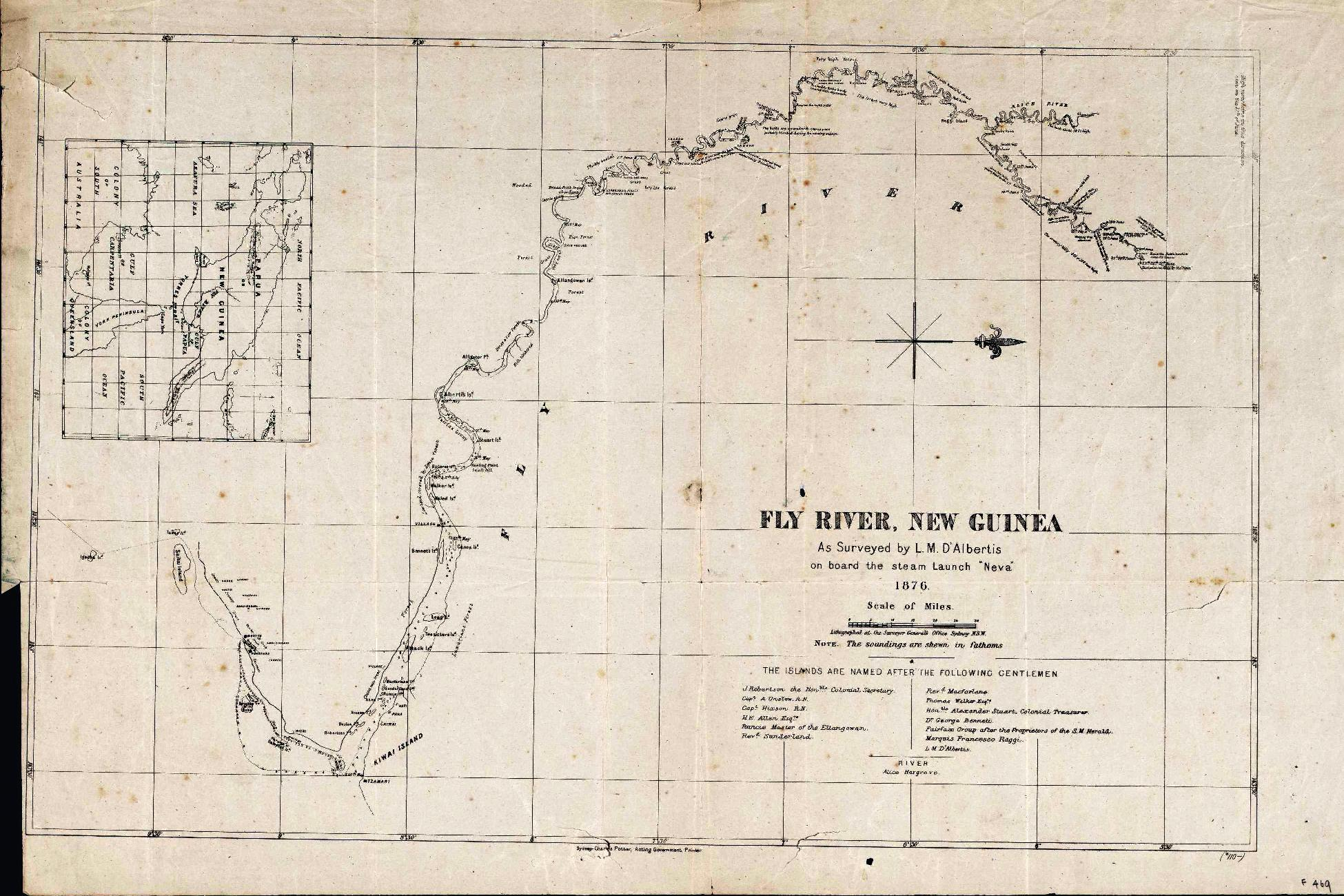
The original survey map created by L.M. D'Albertis in 1876

The delta of the Fly River is over 100 km wide at its entrance, but only 11 km wide at the apex upstream of Kiwai Island. The delta contains three main distributary channels (the Southern, Northern, and Far Northern Entrances) that branch from a common point (the “apex”). The distributary channels are 5 to 15 m in depth, separated by elongate, sand-mud islands that are stabilized by lush mangrove vegetation. The islands are eroded and rebuilt rapidly in the apex area, where they have lateral migration rates of up to 150 m/a, with slower rates for the more seaward islands. Upstream from the apex the river gradually narrows to a width of 1.6 km or less. The Fly Delta exhibits a distinctive funnel shape in plan view, attesting to the fundamental role of tidal currents in shaping the Delta's geomorphology. Mean spring tidal ranges are amplified within the delta, from around 3.5 m at the seaward entrance of the distributary channels, reaching a peak of about 5 m at the delta apex. Seismic profiles and radiometrically dated core samples indicate that the delta is prograding seawards at an average rate of about 6 m/a

The Fly Delta is considered a global "type case" of a tide-dominated delta and the patterns of sedimentation seen in the delta today have been studied by sedimentary geologists as a model for interpreting the ancient rock record.

The river delta is studded with low and swampy islands covered with mangroves and nipa palm, with villages and cultivated areas on these islands. The land on both sides of the estuary is of the same character. The islands in the estuary are flat and covered with thick, fertile alluvial soil. The largest islands are Kiwai Island, Purutu Island, Wabuda Island, Aibinio Island, Mibu Island, and Domori Island. Kiwai, Wabuda, and Domori are inhabited.

A list of the river delta islands is:

- Kiwai Island
- Purutu Island
- Wabuda Island
- Aibinio Island
- Mibu Island
- Magabu Island
- Invitato Island
- Sisiabu Island
- Nikira Island
- Badu Island
- Baiabe Island
- Moroge Island
- Gebaro Island
- Dawari Island
- Wariura Island
- War Island
- Kesuguruguru Island
- Abaura Island
- Abo Island
- Boromura Island
- Ura Island
- Dogope Island
- Sumogi Island
- Sobowada Island
- Abaurai Island
- Samari
- Reginimi Island
- Dibiri Island
- Sobuwabuda Island
- Orope Island
- Aeginimi Islands
- Umuda Island
- Midima Island
- Domori Island
- Dubuwaro Island
- Kuragimini Island
- Daura Island
- Kunagimini Islands

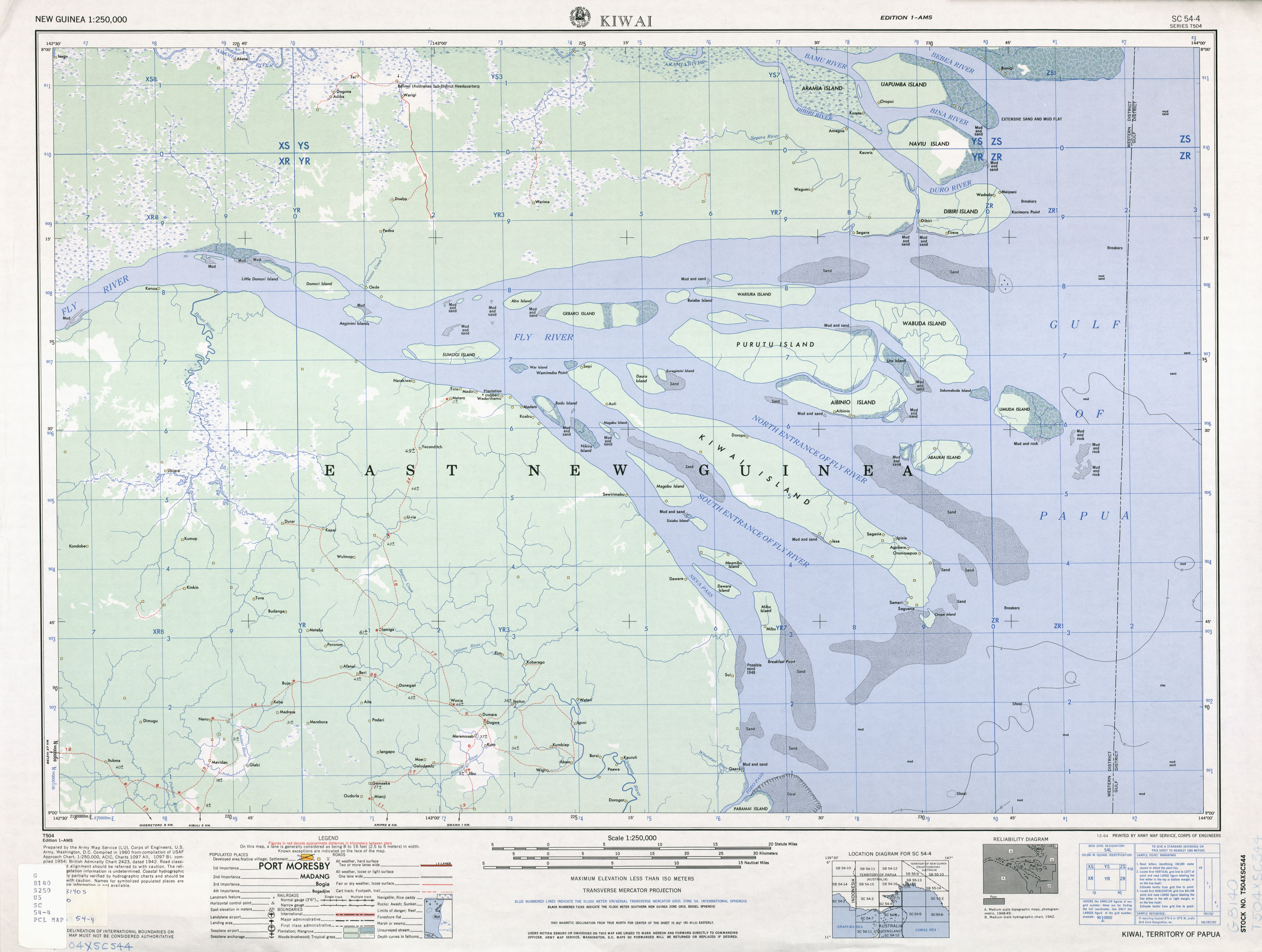
Map of Fly River Delta

The inhabitants of the Fly River delta engage in agriculture and hunting. Coconut palm, breadfruit, plantain, sago palm, and sugar cane are grown.

== Fly River turtle ==
The Fly River turtle, also known as the Pig-nosed turtle due to its odd nose, is notably different from other turtles because of its pig-like nose. The only freshwater turtle to have flippers, the turtle is known to rarely leave water, except in dire circumstances. They are also known to be omnivores that rarely eat meat.

== History ==
The Fly was first discovered by Europeans in 1845 when Francis Blackwood, commanding the corvette HMS Fly, surveyed the western coast of the Gulf of Papua. The river was named after his ship and he proclaimed that it would be possible for a small steam-powered boat to travel up the mighty river.

In 1876, Italian explorer, Luigi D'Albertis, was the first person to successfully attempt this when he travelled 900 km into the interior of New Guinea, in his steamer, Neva. It was the furthest any European explorer had ever been into the island.

== Environmental issues ==
Both the Strickland and the Ok Tedi Rivers have been the source of environmental controversy due to tailings waste from the Porgera Mine and the Ok Tedi Mine, respectively. Sediment sampling and coring in the distributary channels of the Fly Delta had not detected copper concentrations significantly higher than background as of 1994. In 2008, Ian Campbell, a former advisor to Ok Tedi Mining Limited, claimed that company data suggest significant portions of the Fly River floodplain are at a high risk from acid mine drainage.

== See also ==
- Southern New Guinea freshwater swamp forests
- Ok Tedi environmental disaster
- List of rivers of Oceania
- List of rivers of Papua New Guinea
- List of rivers of Indonesia
- List of rivers by discharge
