= Kiwai Rural LLG =

Local-level government in Papua New Guinea

- District map of Western Province
- Country: Papua New Guinea
- Province: Western Province
- Time zone: UTC+10 (AEST)

Kiwai Rural LLG is a local-level government (LLG) of Western Province, Papua New Guinea. Kiwaian languages are spoken in the LLG.

== Wards ==
- 01. Sigabaduru
- 02. Mabudawan
- 03. Tureture
- 04. Sui
- 05. Severimabu
- 06. Doumori
- 07. Variobadoro
- 08. Maduduo (Waboda language speakers)
- 09. Tire'ere (Waboda language speakers)
- 10. Wapi (Waboda language speakers)
- 11. Sagasia
- 12. Buzi
- 13. Mawatta
- 14. Parama
- 15. Aberagerema
- 16. Wabada
- 17. Sepe
- 18. Samari
- 19. Kadawa
- 20. Madame
- 21. Maipani
- 22. Kename
- 23. U'uwo
- 24. Katatai

== See also ==
- Kiwaian languages
- Kiwai Island
