= Kiwai language =

Papuan language

Kiwai
- Native to: Papua New Guinea
- Region: Western Province, Fly River delta
- Native speakers: ca. 30,000 (2011)
- Language family: Kiwaian: Kiwai
- Dialects: Doumori; Coast Kiwai; Southern Coast Kiwai; Daru Kiwai; Eastern Kiwai; Island Kiwai; Gibaio; Kope (Gope, Era River); Urama; Arigibi (Anigibi)

Language codes
- ISO 639-3: Either: kiw – Northeast Kiwai kjd – Southern Kiwai
- Glottolog: nort2930 Northeast sout2949 Southern

Kiwai is a Papuan language, or languages, of southern Papua New Guinea. Dialects number 1,300 Kope, 700 Gibaio, 1,700 Urama, 700 Arigibi (together "Northeast Kiwai"), 3,800 Coast, 1,000 Daru, 4,500 Island, 400 Doumori (together "Southern Kiwai"). Wurm and Hattori (1981) classify Arigibi as a separate language.

== Introduction ==
Kiwai Island is a long/low island located on the Eastern side of the Southern entrance to the delta of the Fly River (Papua).

== Alphabet ==
- 17 Letters
  - vowels: a, e, i, o, u (diphthongs are combinations of any two vowels, e.g. ai, au, oi, ou, ei, etc.)
  - Consonants: k, g, t, s, d, n, r, p, b, m, v, h
  - Semivowel: w/u, i/y /j/

== Phonology ==
=== Consonants ===
		Labial	Alveolar	Velar	Glottal
Nasal		m	n		
Plosive	voiceless	p	t	k	ʔ
Plosive	voiced	b	d	ɡ	
Fricative		(v)	s		h
Rhotic			ɾ		
Approximant		w	(l)		

/m/ can have allophones of [v, β] when in intervocalic positions.

[l] can be heard interchangeably with /ɾ/ in some dialects.

=== Vowels ===
	Front	Central	Back
High	i		u
Mid	ɛ~e		o
Low		a	

/ɛ/ may also range to [e].

== Grammar ==
=== Parts of speech ===
Parts of speech are associated with the standard European parts of speech, somewhat inelegantly. The three major parts of speech are Nominals, Verbs and Particles:

Nominals

1. Nouns, Adjectives, Pronouns (Personal and Relative), Interrogative words, Nominal adverbs, Numerals

Nominals are declined for case (including the ergative).

Verbs

1. Verbs

Particles

1. Interrogative particles, Particle Adverbs, Postpositions, Interjections, Particle Conjunctions

=== Nouns ===
While most nouns in Kiwai are mono-morphemic, many are derived or compounds, such as verbal nouns, nominalised adjectives, attribute-category compounds, and so on. Reduplication also exists, usually creating an intensification of the core meaning, distributive effect, and so on.

Derivation is by prefixing and/or suffixing. For example, verbal nouns are created by prefixing k- to the verb word-base.

=== Adjectives ===
Like all other languages in the Torres Strait area as well as Torres Strait Creole, adjectives precede nouns. Various derived adjectives exist, such as Verbal Adjectives, Proprietive, Negative, Similative, and Assertative.

Interrogatives can be created using the Interrogative Prefix.

=== Pronouns ===
Personal pronouns indicate person and number (singular, dual, plural, trial), do not indicate gender, and are declined for case, including the ergative and genitive. The 1st person non-singular, unlike other languages in the area, does not distinguish inclusive and exclusive.

=== Verbs ===
Verbs are highly complex, consisting of a "verbal word-base" and various prefixes and suffixes, marking for tense, aspect, mood and cross-marking for subject and object. Verbal Word-Bases always begin and end with a vowel or a diphthong. It is the simplest form of a verb that is used in speech forms.

=== Syntax ===
Syntax is the arrangement of words in order to create a well-structured sentence. For the Kiwai language, there are principal rules for the positioning of words.

1. The subject precedes verb/predicate
2. The D.O (direct object) precedes the verb, which then follows the subject
3. The word that modifies the subject/object precedes
4. Numerals precede nouns
5. Sometimes the extensions of the predicate precede the verb
6. If time is involved, the indications of time will normally appear at the beginning of a sentence
7. Infinitive phrases will appear at the end of sentences
8. Particles will precede the verb

=== Number ===
- Number can be indicated by verbal suffixes
- Most nouns do not mark for number (few nouns have a separate plural form)

=== Gender ===
Kiwai is gender free; male and female is shown by specific terms when needed.

== Dialects ==
There are six main dialects of this language.

1. Mawata-Daru-Tureture Kiwai
2. Southern Kiwai
  1. from Parema north on the and neighbouring islands, includsing Kiwai Island.
  2. Adopted as the standard language for mission purposes in the Delta (by the London Missionary Society)
3. Domori
  1. an island in the Fly Delta northwest of Kiwai
4. Wabuda
  1. an island between the Eastern mouth of the Fly and Bamu Delta
5. Sisiami
  1. Village on the Dibiri branch of the Bamu Delta
6. Goaribari
  1. Mouth of the Bamu Delta

While Kiwai dialects differ in terms of vocabulary, pronunciation and grammar, differences are minor.

== Vocabulary ==
E. Baxter Riley had collected words to be added in the Kiwai-English vocabulary. A lot of the texts and translations have been modified and added by S.H.R.

Verbal Forms: Verbs will be placed under the simple form of the word-base, under the five vowels (a,e,i,o,u). Compounds are followed immediately after. However some of the compounds will be located only under some prefixes. These prefixes being: ar, em, emar, emow, er, erem, im, imar, imow, ir, irim, iriw, irow, iw, iwar, or, oror, ow, owar, and owor. The word-base will then be located by ignoring the following initial letters/syllables in words.

== Evolution ==
Below are some reflexes of proto-Trans-New Guinea proposed by Pawley (2012). The dialect given is Island Kiwai, unless otherwise indicated.

proto-Trans-New Guinea	Kiwai (Island)
*tukumba[C] ‘short’	(?) kopu
*takVn[V] ‘moon’	sagana
*sumbu ‘white ashes’	tuwo
*pi(n,nd)a ‘sister’	abida
*niman ‘louse’	nimo
*ni ‘1PL’	ni(mo)
*mbena ‘arm’	(Kerewo Kiwai bena ‘shoulder’)
*mb(i,u)t(i,u)C ‘fingernail’	pitu
*maŋgat[a] ‘teeth, mouth’	mangota, magata
*m(i,u)ndu ‘nose’	wodi (Gope (N.E. Kiwai) modi)
*kV(mb,p)(i,u)t(i,u) ‘head’	epuru, (Wabuda kepuru)
*kuk(a,u)m(o,u) ‘cold’	(Bamu kukamu, Sisiame kukamo)
*ka(nd,t)(e,i)kV ‘ear’	gare
*k(a,o]ndok[V] ‘foot’	Gope (N.E. Kiwai) oto, Morigi kota
*inja ‘tree, wood, fire’	(S. Kiwai era)
*amu ‘breast’	amo
*a(mb,m)u ‘tail’	(?) wapo
*(nd,s)umu(n,t)[V] ‘hair’	(?) muso (metathesis?)

== Videos ==
- https://www.youtube.com/watch?v=u_XeP9DxsKU
- https://www.youtube.com/watch?v=iB3Co9ggY10
  - 2 hour long film: "The Jesus Film"
