= Waboda language =

Kiwaian language spoken in Papua New Guinea

Waboda
- Native to: Papua New Guinea
- Region: Wabuda Island in the Fly River delta
- Native speakers: 2,800 (2003)
- Language family: Kiwaian: Waboda

Language codes
- ISO 639-3: kmx
- Glottolog: wabo1241

Waboda is a Papuan language of southern Papua New Guinea. In Kiwai Rural LLG, it is spoken in Dameratamu, Gesoa, Kabaturi (8.236886°S 143.574376°E), Maduduo, Meipani, Sagero (8.232149°S 143.536743°E), Tirere (8.233195°S 143.644705°E), and Wapi (8.444552°S 143.538194°E) villages.
