= Birim River (New Guinea) =

Coordinates: 5°42′25.6″S 141°6′1″E

The Birim River or Ok Birim in the western province of New Guinea is a tributary of the Ok Tedi River, which is in turn a tributary of the north Fly River. The Birim river joins the Ok Tedi river from the west between Ningerum and Bige. The Birim river area is inhabited by the Yonggom tribe. They practise tropical forest Swidden agriculture.

There has been ongoing controversy about the impacts on migratory fish stocks and on the environment in general of dredging and other mining operations by Ok Tedi Mining at what remains of the former Mount Fubilan, which during the course of the excavation of the Ok Tedi Mine has been replaced by a massive pit. Since 1984, the people of the area have blamed the mine for a general decline in crop and fish yields.
