= Kiunga =

Kiunga may mean:

== Places ==
- Kiunga, Kenya
  - Kiunga Marine National Reserve
- Kiunga, Papua New Guinea
- Kiunga Rural LLG, Papua New Guinea
- Kiunga Urban LLG, Papua New Guinea

== Other uses ==
- Kiunga (fish), a genus of blue-eyes from Papua New Guinea
