= Olsobip =

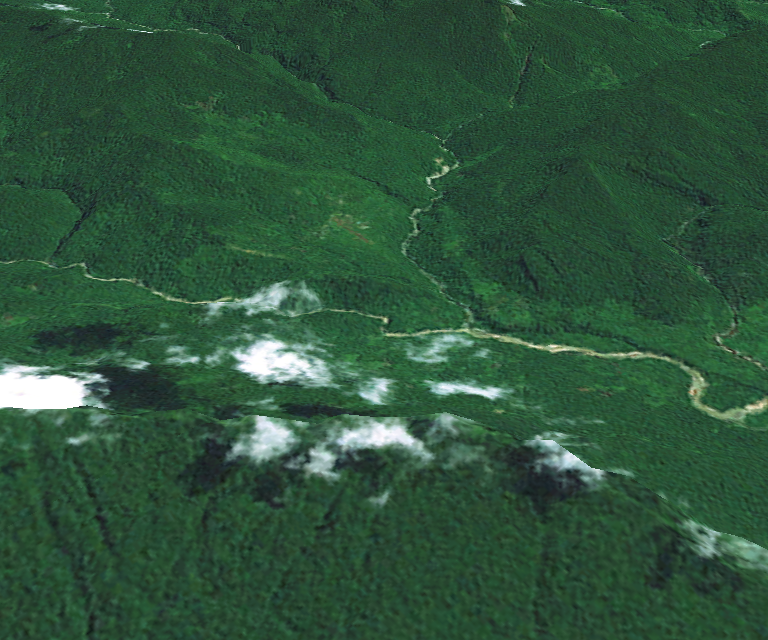
- A Landsat montage of Olsobip township (centre) with the Hindenburg Wall (part of the Hindenburg Range) in the foreground

- Location within Papua New Guinea
- Coordinates: 5°23′S 141°30′E
- Country: Papua New Guinea
- Province: Western Province
- District: North Fly
- LLG: Olsobip Rural

Population (2006 est)
  - Total: 1,000

Languages
  - Main languages: Tok Pisin, English
- Time zone: UTC+10 (AEST)
- Mean max temp: 29 °C (84 °F)
- Mean min temp: 20 °C (68 °F)
- Annual rainfall: 10,000 mm (393.7 in)

Olsobip is a station town in the north of the Papua New Guinean Western province, located on the Upper Fly River. It is the seat of the Olsobip Rural LLG. It has a rural airport (OLQ) but, set in a rich forest, it is inaccessible by road. As a result of its isolation, accurate census data is difficult to obtain from Olsobip.

== History ==
Baptist missionaries were active in Olsobip, establishing the Olsobip Patrol Post. The people of Olsobip belong to the Mountain-Ok culture area which is located in the Western range of Papua New Guinea. This cultural group are noted for their crafts, particularly handdrums which they trade.

== Geography and climate ==
Olsobip is one of the northernmost stations in the province. It lies along the Upper Fly River in an isolated mountainous areas known as the Star Mountains. Although no official scientific weather station has ever been established in the area it is known to be extremely wet and has been claimed to be one of the wettest places on earth with a rainfall in excess of 10 metres (390 in; 33 ft) a year. The villagers are known to have patches of land for growing vegetables.

== Transport ==
Olsobip is a highly inaccessible settlement. Although located along the Upper Fly River, it is not easily accessible by river and is not connected by road. The small airstrip, Olsobip Airport, was built in 1964/5 by local labourers.

== See also ==
- Olsobip Rural LLG
