= Mogulu =

Mogulu may refer to:

- Yujiulü Mugulü, former of the Rouran Khaganate, also known as Mogulu.
- Mogulu (town), is a populated place in the Western Province of Papua New Guinea.
- Mogulu', Romanian trap artist.
