= Glass blue-eye =

Conservation status
- Endangered (IUCN 3.1)

Scientific classification
- Kingdom: Animalia
- Phylum: Chordata
- Class: Actinopterygii
- Order: Atheriniformes
- Family: Pseudomugilidae
- Genus: Kiunga
- Species: K. ballochi

Binomial name
- Kiunga ballochi G. R. Allen, 1983

Species of fish

The glass blue-eye (Kiunga ballochi) is a species of fish in the subfamily Pseudomugilinae. It is endemic to Papua New Guinea where it is only known to occur in a few small creeks adjacent to a 15–20 kilometres (9.3–12.4 miles) stretch of the Ok Tedi Mine supply road between the settlements of Kiunga and Tabubil in the Upper Fly River system close to the frontier with Irian Jaya. This species has a mainly transparent body with silvery gill covers and belly, there are black spots on the margins of the scales and there are black markings on the fins and lateral line, with the fins being shaded with yellow, with the exception of the transparent pectoral fins. It attains a standard length of 3 centimetres (1.2 in). This species was described by Gerald R. Allen in 1983 and its specific name honours the site biologist at the Ok Tedi Mine, David Balloch, for the support and assistance he gave Allen.
