= Mount Fubilan =

Mountain in Papua New Guinea

Coordinates: 5°5′24″S 141°13′5″E

Mount Fubilan was a mountain in the Western Province of Papua New Guinea. It has been removed in the course of the excavation of the Ok Tedi Mine, which been developed since 1984 as an open-pit copper and gold mine. After decades of mining, the mountain has been replaced by a massive pit in the ground.

The copper mining potential of Mount Fubilan was discovered by Kennecott Copper Corporation in 1968. After feasibility studies for an open-pit operation, conducted by a consortium of companies led by BHP, mining started in 1984, with the company processing gold for extraction through a cyanide process.

The first copper processing facilities were commissioned in 1987. By 31 December 2004, 8,896,577 tonnes of copper concentrate had been mined, containing 2,853,265 tonnes of copper and 7,035,477 ounces of gold, worth 12 billion US dollars at today's prices. In addition, between 1985 and 1990, 47.642 tonnes (1,680,553 ounces) of gold bullion was produced.

The mining operation led to the Ok Tedi environmental disaster on account of the discharge of about two billion tons of untreated mining waste into the Ok Tedi River from the Ok Tedi Mine.

== See also ==
- Mountaintop removal
- Ok Tedi environmental disaster
