= Ok Tedi River =

Ok Tedi
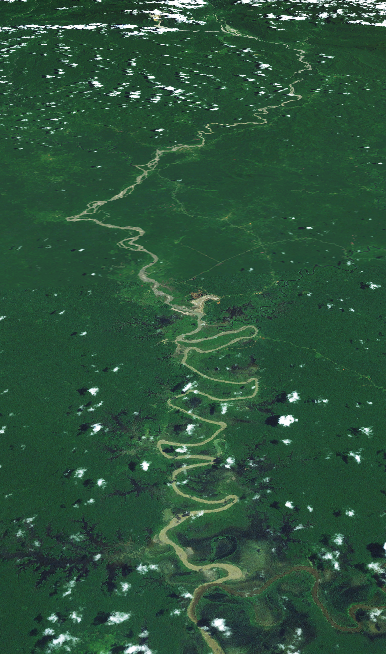
- Satellite image of the Ok Tedi River

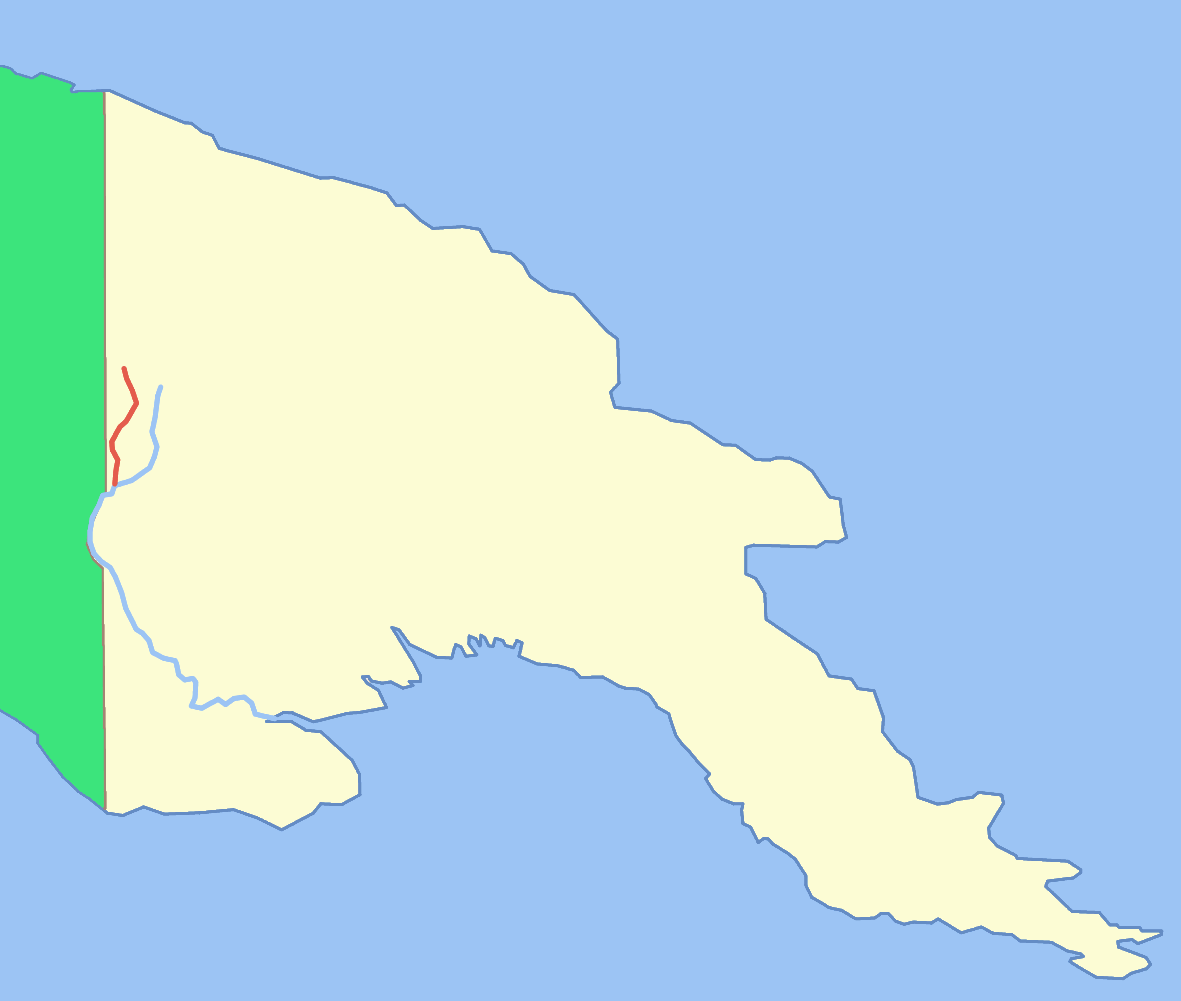
- Location of the Ok Tedi

Location
- Country: Papua New Guinea, Indonesia
- Region: Western Province

Physical characteristics
- Source
  - location: Star Mountains, Papua New Guinea
  - coordinates: 5°5′24″S 141°13′5″E
  - elevation: 1,619 m (5,312 ft)
- Mouth
  - location: Fly, Papua New Guinea
  - coordinates: 6°10′5″S 141°7′8.5″E
  - elevation: 22 m (72 ft)
- Length: 207 km (129 mi)
- Basin size: 5,360 km^{2} (2,070 sq mi)

Basin features
- Tributaries
  - left: Ok Menga, Ok Ma

The Ok Tedi is a river in New Guinea. The Ok Tedi Mine is located near the headwaters of the river, which is sourced in the Star Mountains. It is the second largest tributary of the Fly River. Nearly the entirety of the Ok Tedi runs through the North Fly District of the Western Province of Papua New Guinea, but the river crosses the international boundary with Indonesia for less than one kilometre. The largest settlement of the Western Province, Tabubil is located near its banks.

== Description ==
Known as the Ok Tedi River by the Yonggom people who live on its western bank, it was renamed the Alice River by the Italian explorer Luigi d'Albertis. Ok is the word for water or river in the Ok languages family. It is a tributary of the Fly River. Tributaries of the Ok Tedi include the Birim.

The Kiunga-Tabubil Highway runs parallel with the river for the majority of its course, until just south of Ningerum where the highway veers southeast towards Kiunga, a port town on the Fly River.

The Ok Tedi is extremely fast-moving and has a massive capacity. It is situated on a sand bank, which allows for the river to change course quickly without warning. The sand conditions underneath the river and the extremely high rainfall of the catchment area make it one of the fastest moving rivers in the world. The roar from the river can be heard for many kilometres through the dense jungle of the district.

The pristine river was devastated by the Ok Tedi environmental disaster, when the enormous open-pit copper/gold Ok Tedi mine discharged massive amounts of mining waste directly into the river. Until its seizure by the Government of Papua New Guinea, the mine was owned by BHP.
