= Middle Fly District =

- Location within Papua New Guinea
- Coordinates: 7°1′12″S 142°12′36″E
- Country: Papua New Guinea
- Province: Western Province
- Capital: Balimo
- LLGs: List: Balimo U; Bamu R; Gogodala R; Lake Murray R; Nomad R

Area
  - Total: 44,479 km^{2} (17,173 sq mi)

Population (2011 census)
  - Total: 79,349
  - Density: 1.7840/km^{2} (4.6204/sq mi)
- Time zone: UTC+10 (AEST)

The Middle Fly District of the Western Province of Papua New Guinea is a large, coastal district that forms the central area of the Fly River basin. It contains the Local-Level Government areas of: Balimo Urban, Bamu Rural, Gogodaia Rural, Lake Murray Rural, and Nomad Rural, and the population centres of Balimo, Bamu, Gogodala and Nomad. It also contains the largest lake in the country, Lake Murray.

== Demographics ==
The population of the district in the 2011 census was 79,349. The most Populous LLG in the area at that time was Gogodala, with almost 25,000 people, making Gogodala the most populous LLG in the province.

== Politics ==
The political seat of the district is Balimo. Balimo is situated slightly north of the Fly River, and is an inland settlement of about 4000 people.

== Climate ==
The district is situated on a plain. The plain is a very humid environment, and has a stable tropical temperature of 27 to 32 degrees Celsius. Humid conditions and wetlands are responsible for a major malaria concern.

== Geography ==
The district covers the central area of the Western Province. It shares a Provincial border with Southern Highlands Province and Gulf Province in the east. It shares an international boundary with the Papua province of Indonesia in the west and borders South Fly District in the south, and the North Fly District in the north.

== Economy ==
The Middle Fly District is one of the most underdeveloped economies in the world. The major mining economy of the North Fly has not benefited the residents of the Middle Fly District until recently with the establishment of the PNG Sustainable Development Program which now owns the BHP share of the Ok Tedi Mine. Residents of this district have previously been involved in litigation against BHP for its environmental impact on their subsistence lifestyle.

== See also ==
- Strickland River A major river in the district
- Fly River A major river in the district
- Lake Murray
- Ok Tedi Environmental Disaster
- Balimo
- Nomad
- Gogodala people
