= List of cities and towns in Papua New Guinea by population =

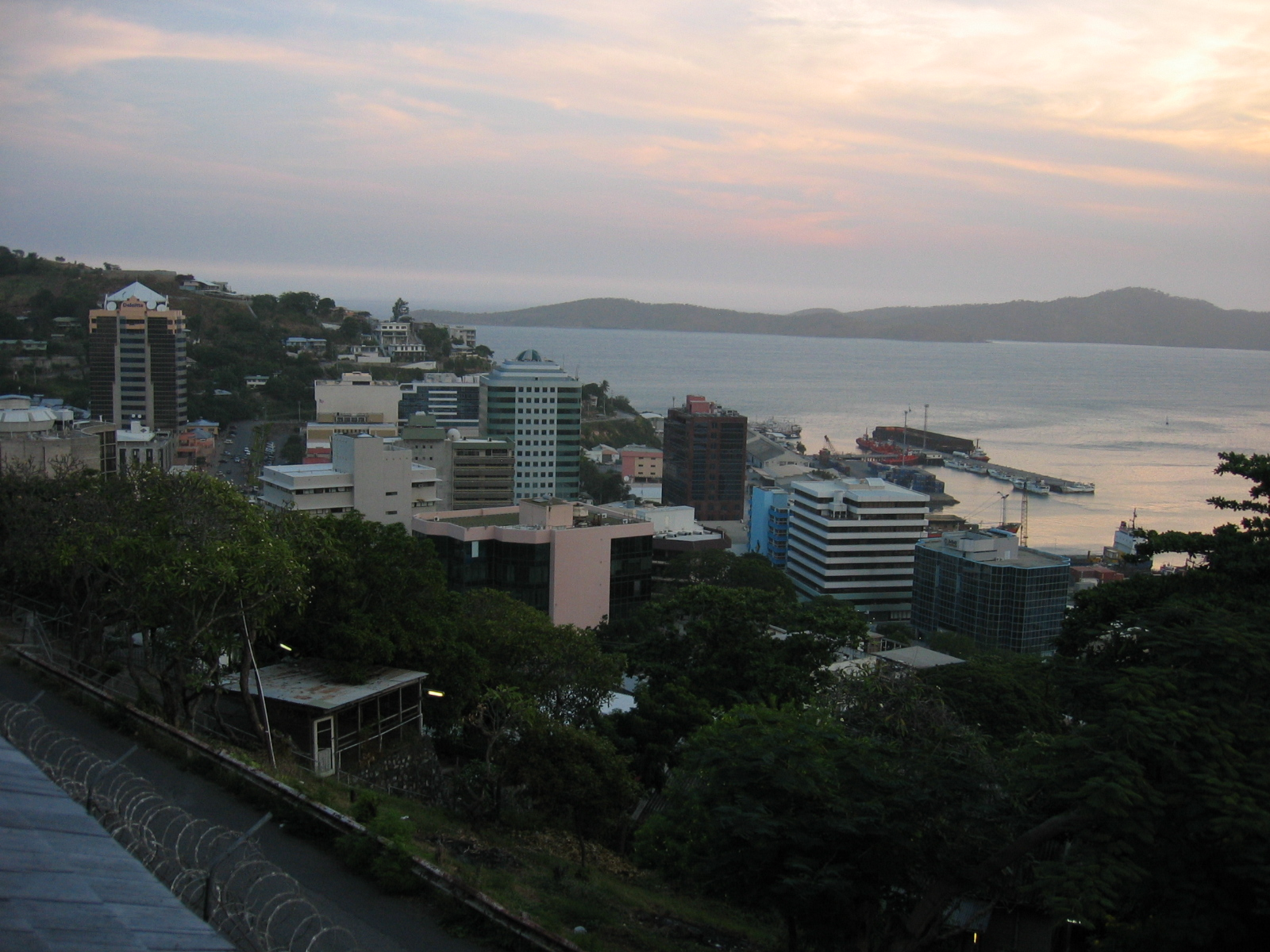
Port Moresby

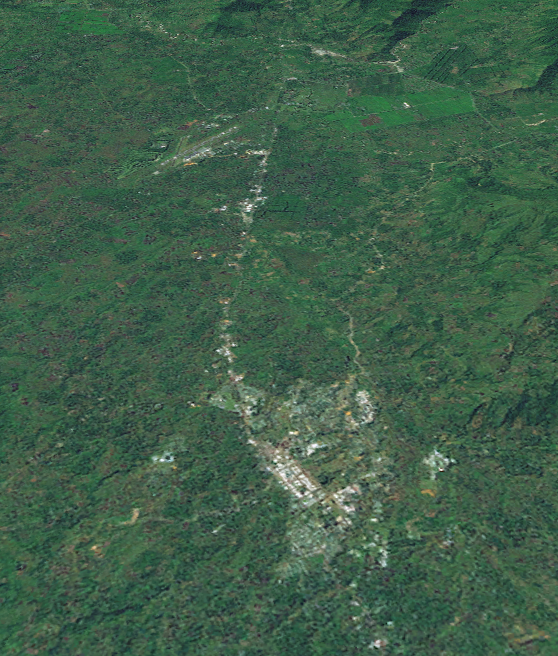
Mount Hagen

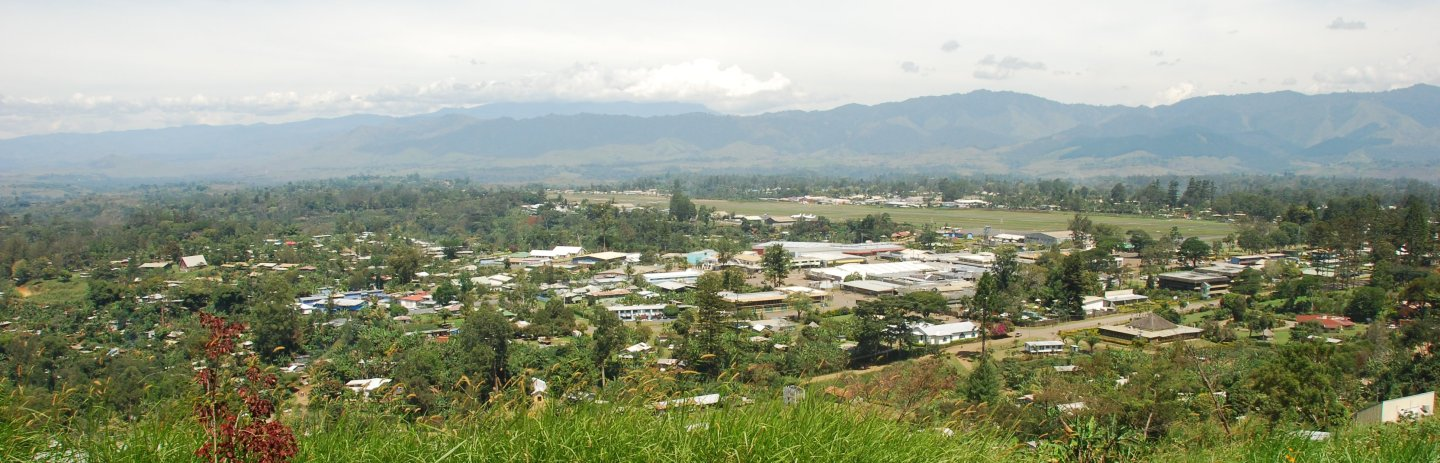
Goroka

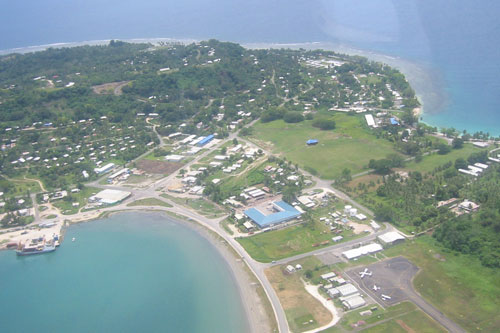
Vanimo

This is a list of cities and towns in Papua New Guinea by population.

Many of these figures were taken from the most recent PNG census, which was in the year 2000. Many population centres had substantially grown since 2000 (such as Port Moresby, Lae, Kimbe, Kokopo, Aitape and Mendi) due to increasing urbanisation in Papua New Guinea, and disaster recovery. On the other hand, Arawa has shrunk dramatically since 1990 due to war.

== List of cities and towns ==
Only population areas with more than 5,000 people, or notable centres are listed.

Rank	Settlement Name	Province	Population
1	Port Moresby*	National Capital District	364,145
2	Lae*	Morobe	100,677
3	Mount Hagen*	Western Highlands	46,256
4	Arawa	Bougainville	44,865
5	Madang*	Madang	29,339
6	Goroka	Eastern Highlands	29,333
7	Wewak	East Sepik	25,143
8	Kokopo*	East New Britain	20,262
9	Popondetta*	Oro	19,556
10	Aitape	Sandaun	18,000
*	Rabaul	East New Britain	17,044
*	Hanuabada	National Capital District	15,000 ~
11	Kimbe*	West New Britain	14,656
12	Tabubil	Western	13,800 ~
13	Daru*	Western	12,879
14	Kavieng*	New Ireland	10,600 ~
15	Alotau*	Milne Bay	10,025
16	Vanimo*	Sandaun	9,809
17	Bulolo	Morobe	9,500 ~
18	Kiunga	Western	8,265
19	Tari	Southern Highlands	8,186
20	Kundiawa*	Simbu	8,147
21	Mendi*	Southern Highlands	8,000 ~
22	Kainantu	Eastern Highlands	6,723
23	Lorengau*	Manus	5,829
24	Ialibu	Southern Highlands	5,478
25	Kerema*	Gulf	5,116
26	Ningerum	Western	5,000 ~
26	Wau	Morobe	5,000 ~
?	Wabag*	Enga	4,072

* Denotes a capital city.
~ Is an estimated population, all other populations were determined by the most recent census, in the year 2000. The next PNG census will be held in 2010.
? Denotes a population with an undetermined rank.

== Disaster and population shift ==
Natural and man-made disaster historically plays a major role in population shift in Papua New Guinea. The most notable are:

Disaster/Population Shift	Place where affected	Notes
1994 volcanic eruption	Rabaul, East New Britain	Displaced thousands of residents.
1997 Western Province drought	Tabubil; Kiunga; Mendi; Tari; Fly River; Southern Highlands	Left many agricultural communities in the highlands without food, and larger landlocked settlements that rely heavily on river shipping. Death toll is unknown. Many people permanently moved.
1998 earthquake and tsunami	Aitape; Sandaun Province; East Sepik Province; Sepik Delta	Killed thousands of residents. Many places were also affected with disease afterward due to improper handling of the dead and greatly reduced living conditions. About 10,000 people became refugees.
Ongoing Bougainville conflict	Arawa; Kieta; Panguna; Bougainville Island; Buka Island	This conflict caused unmeasurable but significant displacement. The 2000 CIA world Factbook states that 20,000 people died in the conflict by 1997.
Indonesian refugee population shift	Western Province; Sandaun	Many refugee camps exist on the border of Indonesia, such as Black Wara, one of the biggest. The population of the Western Province refugee camps during the 2000 census was set at around 10,000, although the number of Indonesian refugees in the country is much higher.
Squatter settlements	Whole country	Most population centres in Papua New Guinea have shantytown-styled settlements, referred to as squatter settlements. Many people move in and out of these settlements periodically, as village life becomes harder, the appeal of urban life and manufactured goods becomes greater, and efforts are made to disperse the residents.

== See also ==
- Provinces of Papua New Guinea
- Regions of Papua New Guinea
- Districts of Papua New Guinea
- Local-level governments of Papua New Guinea
- List of cities and towns in Papua New Guinea
