= Wopkaimin people =

The Wopkai people, or Wopkaimin, are a small aboriginal tribe of the Faiwol people that lives in the remote Star Mountains in western Papua New Guinea in what is known as the Fly River socio-ecological region. They speak the Wopkai dialect of the Faiwol language.

The Ok Tedi Mine, the third largest open pit copper and gold mine in the world is located in their traditional territory. Before the coming of the mine with construction starting in 1981 the Wopkaimin lived in a subsistence economy. The mine severely impacted the tribe, totally disrupting their traditional patterns of life. For one thing, Tabubil, a town of 12,500 to house mine workers was built in the midst of their territory. Work for wages was available to tribal members, but only at the unskilled level and not on a regular basis. The Wopkaimin, along with many other ethnic groups living in the area now live on a rotating basis between the town of Tabubil, roadside villages along the Kiunga-Tabubil Highway, and in villages away from the mine as jobs are lost or become available.

In 1992, a species of bat, Bulmer's fruit bat (Aproteles bulmerae) previously thought extinct was discovered to still live in Luplupwintem Cave, an enormous cave above the Hindenburg Wall in their territory. This bat was first discovered in the 1970s by David Hyndman, who studied the Wopkaimin. However, the contemporaneous introduction of the shotgun was thought to have resulted in the extinction of the species.
