= Larry Rivers =

American artist, musician, filmmaker, and occasional actor (1923–2002)

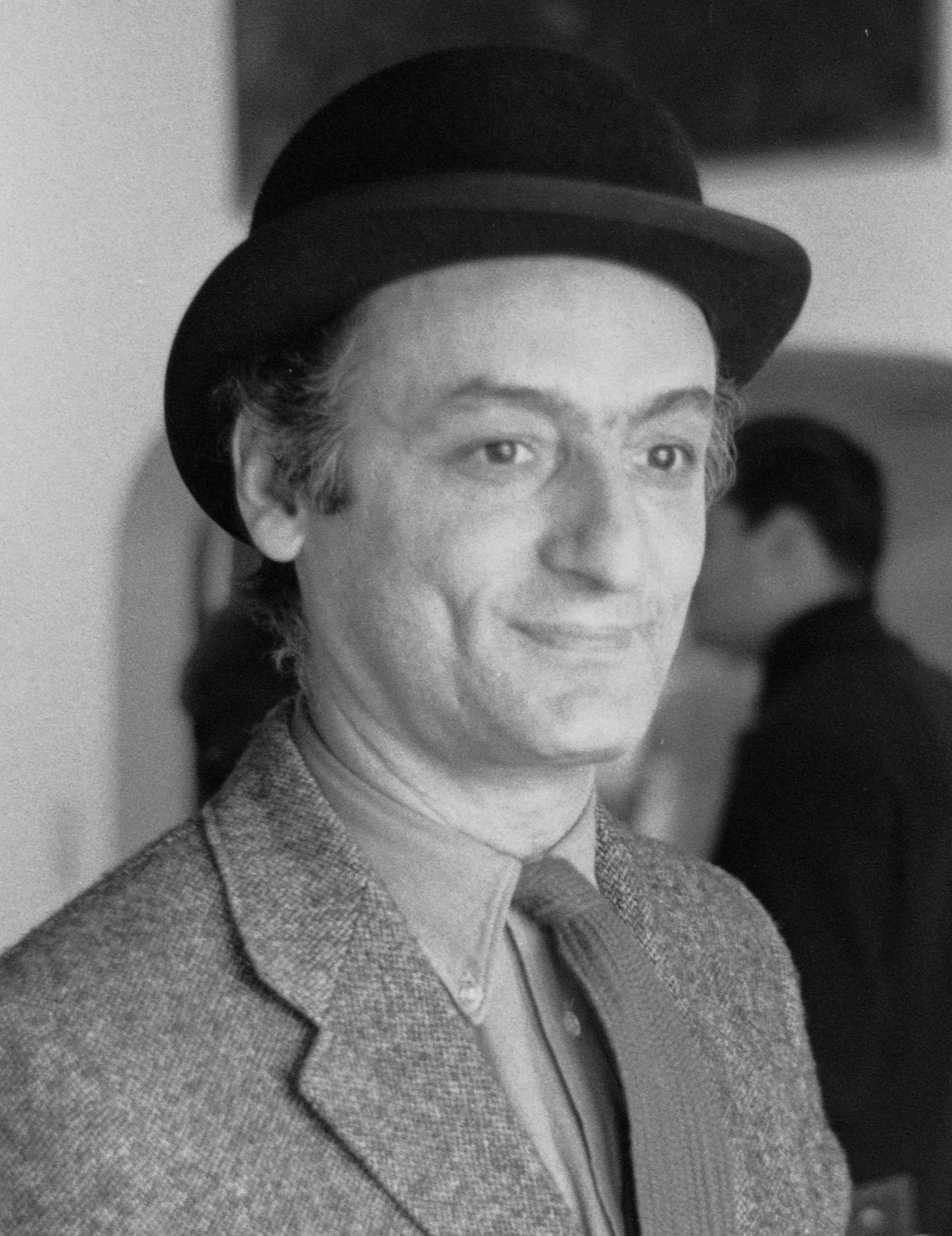
- Rivers in 1961
- Born: Yitzroch Loiza Grossberg; August 17, 1923; New York City, U.S.
- Died: August 14, 2002 (aged 78); Southampton, New York, U.S.
- Education: Hans Hofmann School
- Known for: Painting, sculpture
- Movement: East Coast figurative painting, new realism, pop art
- Spouses: Augusta Berger (m. 1945; div. 1946) Clarice Price (m. 1961; sep. 1967)

Larry Rivers (born Yitzroch Loiza Grossberg; August 17, 1923 – August 14, 2002) was an American painter, musician, filmmaker, and occasional actor. Considered by many scholars to be the "Godfather" and "Grandfather" of Pop art, he was one of the first artists to merge non-objective, non-narrative art with narrative and objective abstraction.

== Early life and education ==
Larry Rivers was born as Yitzroch Loiza Grossberg in the Bronx, New York, in the family of Jewish immigrants from Ukraine. He changed his name to Rivers in 1940 at the start of his career as a musician.

Between 1940 and 1945, he worked as a jazz saxophonist in New York City; he changed his name to Larry Rivers in 1940 after being introduced as "Larry Rivers and the Mudcats."

In 1942, Rivers enlisted in the United States Army Air Corps and joined the Army band, but he was honorably discharged due to a tremor in his left hand. He then studied at the Juilliard School of Music where he befriended jazz musician Miles Davis. Through Davis, who was living with jazz musician Charlie Parker, Rivers met other musicians and began to tour with various groups.

Rivers took up painting in 1945 and studied at the Hans Hofmann School from 1947 through 1948. He earned a BA in art education from New York University in 1951.

== Career ==
His work was quickly acquired by the Museum of Modern Art. A 1953 painting Washington Crossing the Delaware was damaged in a fire at the museum five years later.

Rivers was a pop artist of the New York School, reproducing everyday objects of American popular culture as art. He was one of eleven New York artists featured in the opening exhibition at the Terrain Gallery in 1955. He has been contextualized as working out of the Abstract expressionist legacy of Willem de Kooning, "adapting the freedom of the Abstract Expressionist technique towards figurative ends."

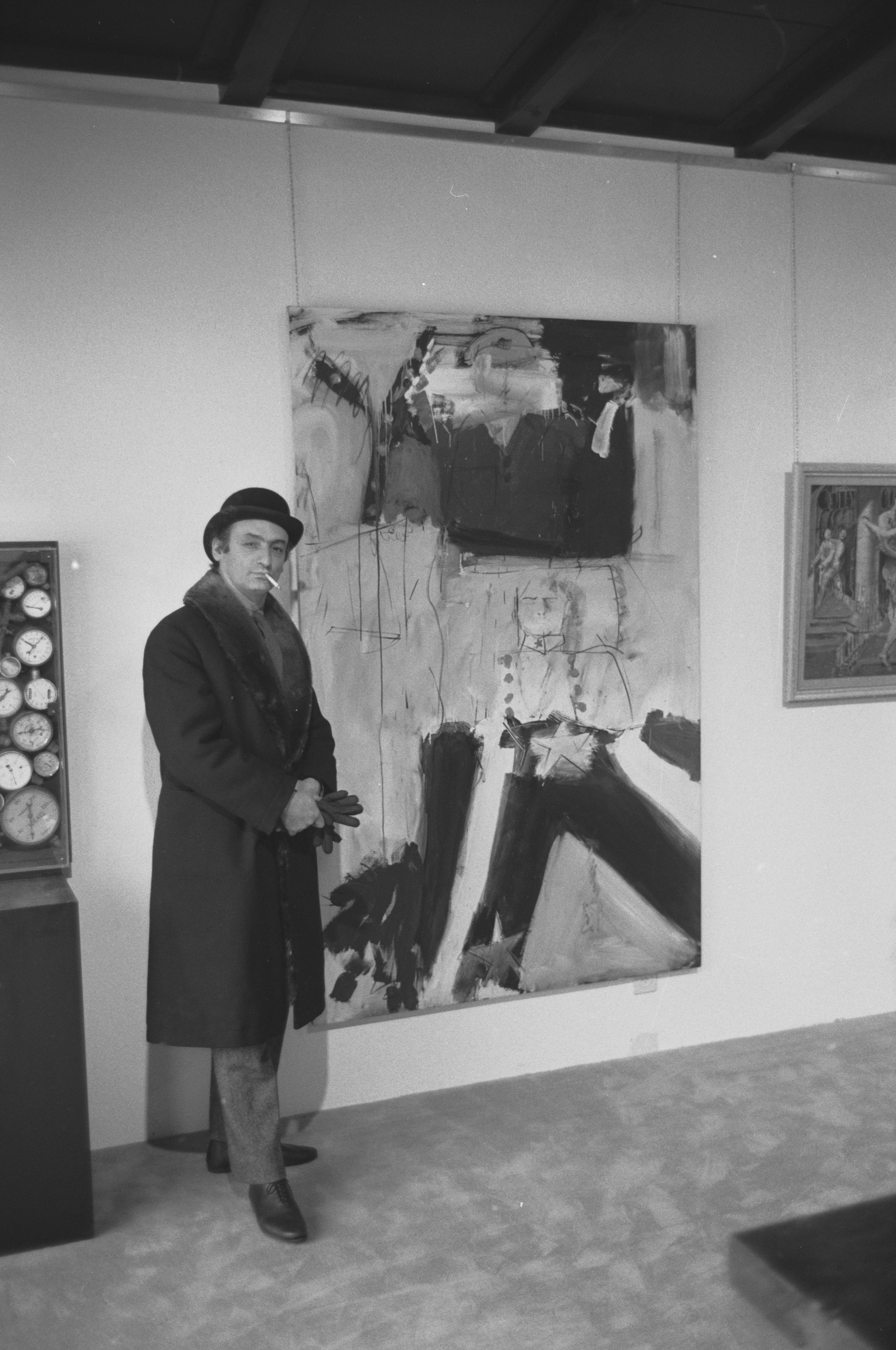
Larry Rivers in 1961

In 1958 Rivers won a $32,000 prize as an art expert on The $64,000 Challenge quiz show.

Rivers appeared in Alfred Leslie and Robert Frank's short film Pull My Daisy (1959), and he played President Lyndon B. Johnson onstage in Kenneth Koch's production Election (1960).

During the early 1960s Rivers lived in Manhattan's Hotel Chelsea where he brought several of his French nouveau réalistes friends like Yves Klein who wrote there in April 1961 his Manifeste de l'hôtel Chelsea, Arman, Martial Raysse, Jean Tinguely, Niki de Saint-Phalle, Christo, Daniel Spoerri or Alain Jacquet, several of whom, like Rivers, left some pieces of art in the lobby of the hotel for payment of their rooms.

In 1965, Rivers had his first comprehensive retrospective in five important American museums.

His final work for the exhibition was The History of the Russian Revolution, which was later on extended permanent display at the Hirshhorn Museum and Sculpture Garden in Washington, DC. He spent 1967 in London collaborating with the American painter Howard Kanovitz.

In 1967, Rivers traveled to Africa with filmmaker Pierre Dominique Gaisseau. They spent six months producing a television travelogue about Africa, filming in Tanzania, Kenya, Uganda, and the Congo. During the trip, they were arrested in Benin City, Nigeria, in January 1968, on suspicion of being mercenaries in the Nigerian Civil War. A Nigerian Army officer ordered their execution, but withdrew the order after speaking with Gaisseau, who had won an Academy Award for The Sky Above, the Mud Below (1961). The two were released after four days in detention. Broadcast in April 1968 as part of NBC Experiments in Television, their documentary Africa and I was described by Newsday critic Barbara Delatiner as "something like a Rivers canvas: complex, brilliantly colorful and maybe too tongue-in-cheek for serious consideration."

During the 1970s, Rivers worked closely with Diana Molinari and Michel Auder on many video tape projects, including the infamous Tits, and also worked in neon.

Rivers's legs appeared in John Lennon and Yoko Ono's 1971 film Up Your Legs Forever.

In 1971, he curated Some American History at the Institute for the Arts at Rice University in Houston, where his own work was exhibited alongside that of African-American artists Ellsworth Ausby, Peter Bradley, Frank Bowling, Daniel LaRue Johnson, Joe Overstreet, and William T. Williams. The exhibition, which intended to focus on violence against African-Americans, was widely criticized by national press along with the black artists whose work was shown, many of whom felt that Rivers' curation focused on his own experiences as a non-black person instead of uplifting and highlighting the perspectives of the black artists who had experienced the racism the show was supposed to foreground.

His primary gallery was the Marlborough Gallery in New York City.

Throughout his career, the artist maintained studios in New York City; Southampton, Long Island; and Zihuatanejo, Mexico.

== Personal life ==
In 1945, Rivers married Augusta Berger, and they had one son, Steven. Rivers also adopted Joseph, Berger's son from a previous relationship, and reared both children after the couple divorced. He lived with his mother-in-law, Berdie Burger, who was a favorite model of his, in Southampton, Long Island, from 1953 through 1957.

In 1960, Rivers met Clarice Price (1936–2024), a Welsh-born school teacher and artist's model from London. She was hired to manage his household and care for his son Steven. Although, Rivers had a girlfriend at the time, their professional relationship developed into a romance and they married in 1961. Price served as a muse for Rivers, appearing in his films and paintings, including Clarice With a Blue Eye: The Artist's Wife and Parts of the Face: French Vocabulary Lesson. The couple had two daughters together, Gwynne and Emma. They separated in 1967, but remained on friendly terms and stayed married for the rest of Rivers's life.

Rivers maintained relationships with several women, including Diana Molinari, a nanny to his daughters who lived in his loft as an occasional girlfriend. He also live with Sheila Lanham, a Baltimore artist and poet whom he met when she was 22. During the 1970s, he also dated Shelly Dunn, who later left him to marry Andy Warhol associate Vincent Fremont.

In the early 1980s, Rivers met East Village figurative painter Daria Deshuk (1956–2017), then a 25-year-old art student. They subsequently lived together and had a son, Sam Deshuk Rivers, in 1985. They remained good friends until Rivers's death.

Rivers was also involved with poet Frank O'Hara in the late 1950s and delivered the eulogy at O'Hara's funeral, in 1966.

== Death ==
Rivers died of liver cancer at the age of 78 in Southampton, New York on August 14, 2002. He was survived by his estranged wife Clarice Rivers, five children, his sisters Geri Block and Joan Gordon, and his companion of five years, poet Jeni Olin.

== Legacy ==
In 2002, a major retrospective of Rivers's work was held at the Corcoran Gallery of Art in Washington, D.C. New York University bought correspondences and other documents from the Larry Rivers Foundation to house in their archive.

=== Controversy ===
In 1976, Rivers began filming 11-year old Gwynne for Growing, a film documenting their developing body through puberty. The footage included nude scenes and interviews of Rivers questioning Gwynne about her body. A year and a half later, Rivers also began filming his daughter Emma. The filming sessions continued for four years. In the early 1980s, Rivers edited Growing and added screen credits; He intended to play the film in a continuous loop alongside his paintings. Rivers abandoned his plans after his estranged wife Clarice Rivers, mother of his daughters, objected, and he placed the film and its outtakes in storage.

In 2010, the Larry Rivers Foundation negotiated the sale of his archives to New York University, including Growing, subject to restrictions preventing public access during Emma's lifetime. Emma opposed the transfer and sought to have the footage destroyed. She told The New York Times that the filming had contributed to her anorexia at age 16, saying it had "wrecked a lot of my life." Following the controversy, the university withdrew from acquiring the film. The foundation's board members, which included Rivers's sister Joan Gordon and his son Steven, refused to hand over Growing to Emma. David Joel, director of the foundation, said it must be preserved as artwork and source material for 1981 painting by Rivers that incorporated still images from the film. Rivers's other sons Joseph and Sam also supported the preservation.

== See also ==
- Bodley Gallery
- LGBT culture in New York City
- List of LGBT people from New York City
