= Wopkaimin =

Wopkaimin may refer to:

- Wopkaimin people
- Wopkaimin language
