= Kiunga bleheri =

Scientific classification
- Kingdom: Animalia
- Phylum: Chordata
- Class: Actinopterygii
- Order: Atheriniformes
- Family: Pseudomugilidae
- Genus: Kiunga
- Species: K. bleheri

Binomial name
- Kiunga bleheri G. R. Allen, 2004

Species of fish

Kiunga bleheri is a species of blue-eyes from the subfamily Pseudomugilinae, part of the rainbowfish family Melanotaeniidae which is endemic to Papua New Guinea. It was described by Gerald R. Allen in 2004 from a type locality of Tare Creek at 11.5 kilometres (7.1 miles) from the central market of Kiunga on the Konkonda Road. and Allen coined the specific name in honour of the collector of the type, the tropical fish wholesaler Heiko Bleher.
