= Jan Sneep =

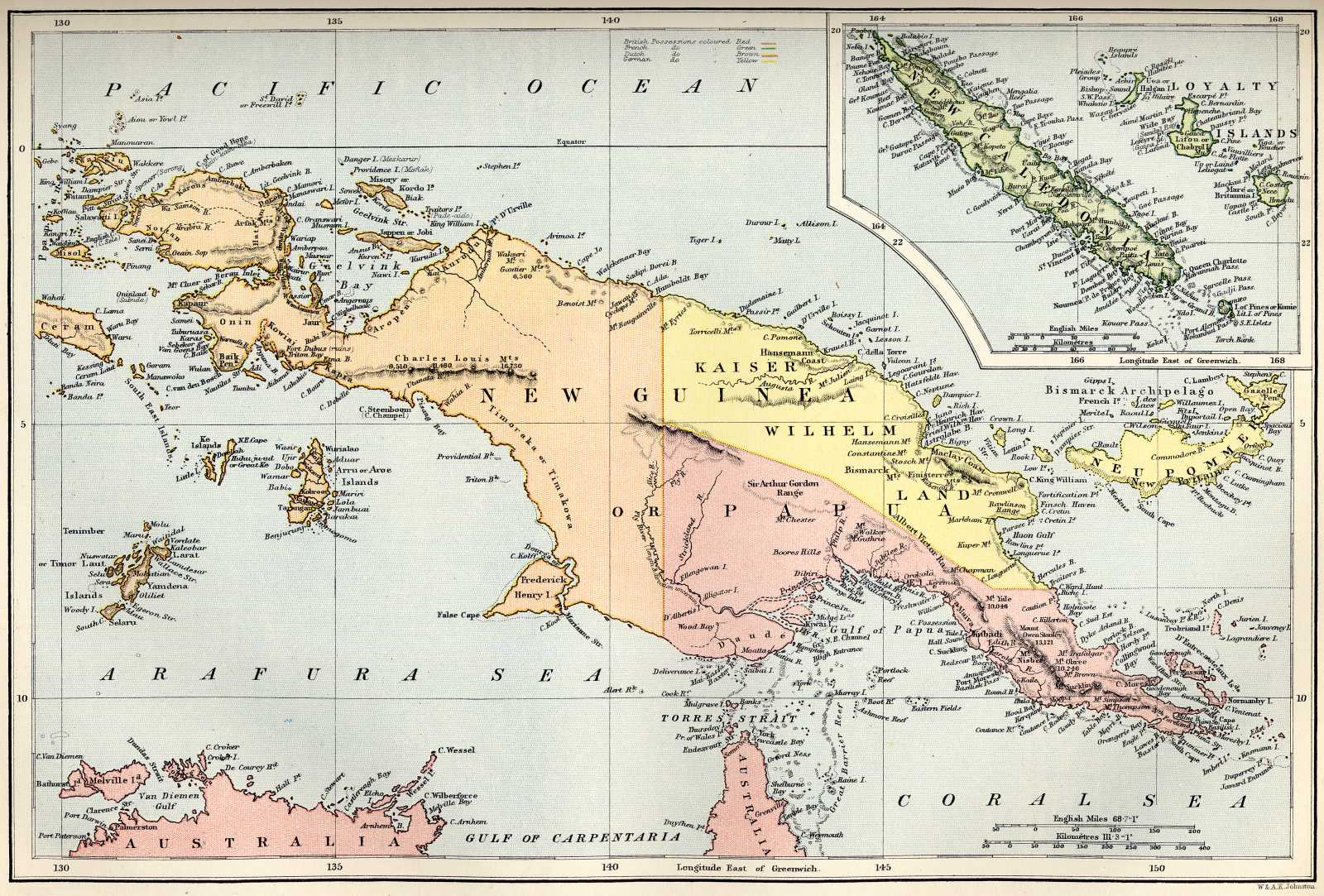
An 1884 map of New Guinea; the Star Mountains are shown in the centre of the island, crossed by the border

Jan Sneep (died 16 January 2016 in Voorschoten) was a Dutch civil servant and adventurer, best known for the 7-month, thousand-mile Franco-Dutch expedition across what was then Netherlands New Guinea, led by Pierre-Dominique Gaisseau.

Sneep was a civil servant working for the Dutch colonial government in a little village in the Sibil Valley. He spoke Malay and a few hundred words of Sibil, and was adept at making contact with inland tribes. In 1958 he had made the Sibil Valley an official Dutch outpost, and in 1959 he joined the expedition that mapped the Star Mountains, until then a white spot on the map. In 1959, he joined the French-Dutch expedition that crossed the island from south to north, across its central mountains. That expedition, whose account is the subject of the documentary film Sky Above and Mud Beneath, found the source of what they called the Princess Marijke River (after Princess Christina of the Netherlands), (which they followed as much as possible to descend from the mountains. Sneep got sick with yellow fever in February 1960, during the second leg of the expedition. After the expedition he moved back to the Netherlands, never to return to Papua; he said that seeing the people again, after the handover to Indonesia, would make him "too sad". He died aged 81 in Voorschoten, on 16 January 2016.

Sneep authored Einde van het stenen tijdperk ("End of the stone age") about his years in New Guinea (Amsterdam: Rozenberg, 2005 ISBN 9051709277).
