= North Fly District =

- Location within Papua New Guinea
- Coordinates: 6°7′S 141°18′E
- Country: Papua New Guinea
- Province: Western Province
- Capital: Kiunga
- LLGs: List: Kiunga (R) (U); Ningerum (R); Olsobip (R); Star Mountains (R)

Area
  - Total: 21,846 km^{2} (8,435 sq mi)

Population (2011)
  - Total: 62,850
- Time zone: UTC+10 (AEST)

The North Fly District of the Western Province of Papua New Guinea is the northernmost, smallest, and arguably the most remote of the three districts of the province. It contains the Local-Level Government (LLG) areas of Kiunga Rural, Kiunga Urban, Ningerum Rural, Olsobip Rural and Star Mountains Rural, and the townships of Kiunga, Tabubil, Olsobip and Ningerum.

== Demographics ==
The population of the district in the 2011 census was 62,850. The most populous LLG in the area at that time was Kiunga Rural, with almost 13,500 people, making the greater Kiunga area the most populous area in the district with about 21,000 people. The township itself, however, is smaller with about 8,300 residents, and is dwarfed by Tabubil, a much newer settlement in Star Mountains Rural LLG which was recently estimated (2006) to have 13,500 residents, making it the largest settlement in the Western Province and the 12th largest settlement in the country.

== Politics ==
The political centre of the district is Kiunga, and government representatives are elected periodically.

There are a total of 105 police in the district, but only three of these are located outside Tabubil and Kiunga. These townships also host court houses. A jail has recently been re-opened in the district at Ningerum.

== Climate ==
The district has an average annual rainfall of 8 metres or 310 inches. A peak rainfall of over 10 metres or 390 inches may be realised in the highlands. Olsobip, one of the northernmost settlements in the district, is probably one of the wettest places on earth, a fact that cannot be established scientifically, due to the absence of a weather station. The district is landlocked, and is heavily reliant on its high rainfall for shipping.

The majority of the district is situated on a plain. The beginning of the Star Mountains is the southernmost point in the district that is more than a few hundred metres above sea level. The plain is a very humid environment, and has a stable tropical temperature of 27 to 32 °C (80.6 to 89.6 °F). The highlands are slightly cooler, with a temperature range of 19 to 27 °C (66.2 to 80.6 °F).

== Geography ==
The district covers the northern area of the Western Province. It shares a provincial border with Sandaun in the north and Southern Highlands Province in the east. It shares an international boundary with Papua province of Indonesia in the west and borders Middle Fly District in the south.

The southern area of North Fly District is a massive plain, and the highlands begin around Tabubil, at the foot of the Star Mountains. The province south of this point is rather low lying, and doesn't increase in altitude above a few hundred metres. The border with Sandaun, however, rises to 3,727 metres.

The total land mass of the North Fly District is 13,138 km², slightly larger than Enga Province. The district is home to the sources of the Fly River and Ok Tedi River. The Strickland River also flows through this district.

== Economy ==
Most of the economy of the District revolves around the Ok Tedi Mine, the largest economic entity in the Western Province, accounting for over half of the entire province's economy and 25.7% of the country's entire export earnings. Ok Tedi's base of operations is Tabubil. There is also a productive rubber industry situated around Kiunga. Kiunga holds the main port of the province, and ships a lot of supplies in, and copper from Ok Tedi Mine, rubber and lumber out. The Kiunga-Tabubil Highway runs through the district and is a main supply line, and a feat of engineering in its own right. The highway was built and is maintained by Ok Tedi Mining Limited.

== See also ==
- Ok Tedi River A major river in the district
- Strickland River A major river in the district
- Fly River A major river in the district
- Kiunga-Tabubil Highway
- Ok Tedi Mine The mine site that provides the main economic drive behind the district, and the province itself, operated by Ok Tedi Mining Limited (OTML).
- Ok Tedi Environmental Disaster
- Kiunga
- Tabubil
- Ningerum
- Olsobip
