= Daru Island =

Island in the Western Province of Papua New Guinea

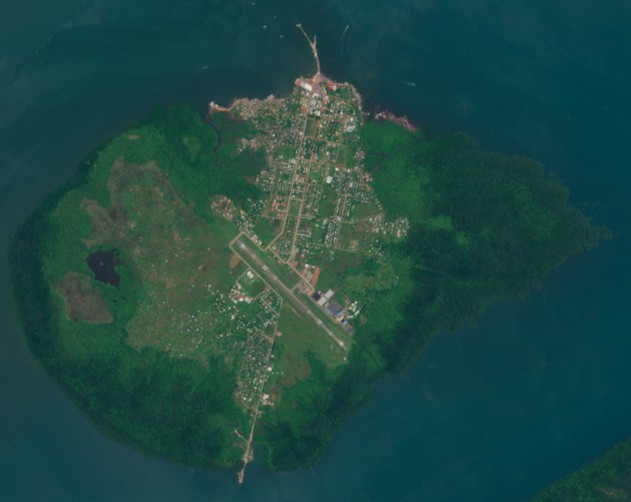
- Daru Island from space

- Daru Island is off the south coast of New Guinea in the Torres Strait

- Location within Papua New Guinea

Geography
- Location: Torres Strait
- Coordinates: 09°05′10″S 143°12′27″E
- Area: 14.7 km^{2} (5.7 sq mi)
- Length: 5.0 km (3.11 mi)
- Width: 3.7 km (2.3 mi)
- Highest elevation: 27 m (89 ft)
- Highest point: unnamed

Administration
- Papua New Guinea
- Province: Western Province
- District: South Fly District
- LLG: Daru Urban
- Largest settlement: Daru (pop. 12879)

Demographics
- Population: 12,879 (2000)
- Pop. density: 876/km^{2} (2269/sq mi)
- Ethnic groups: Kiwai; Torres Strait Islanders

Daru Island is an island in the Western Province of Papua New Guinea. It is one of the Torres Strait Islands. The eponymous town on the island is the capital of the province, and houses the vast majority of the island's population of 20,524 (2009). Daru Island is elliptical in shape, with dimensions of 5.0 by 3.7 kilometers, an area of 14.7 km^{2}, and an elevation of up to 27 m. The island is separated from the mainland in the north, specifically the mouth of Oriomo River, by the 3.5 km wide Daru Roads. The shortest distance to the larger Bristow Island (also called Bobo Island) in the south is 1.3 km.

Daru Island is one of the few Torres Strait Islands that do not belong to Australia, but to Papua New Guinea. It is also the most highly populated of the Torres Strait Islands, although scarcely any original Torres Strait Islanders live on the island. The main industry on the island is fishing although few fisheries are locally owned. The island has an international airport which is mainly used by Australian aircraft chartered by mining companies for customs clearance or to pick up jet fuel. Commercial flights service Daru Airport four days per week.

== History ==
The first recorded sighting by Europeans was by the Spanish expedition of Luís Vaez de Torres on 5 September 1606.

The island's airport was used to refuel Allied aircraft during World War II and seaplanes operated from nearby waters.

In 2020 the PNG Government signed a memorandum of understanding with the Chinese Fujian Zhonghong Fishery Company which intends to build a "comprehensive multi-functional fishery industrial park" on the island. Another Chinese company, WYW Holding Limited, reportedly proposed building a city to be called "New Daru City" on the island in a letter to the PNG Government in April 2020. However, the Government has stated that it has not considered such a proposal, and has no plans to designate the island a 'business, commercial and industrial zone' as the letter proposed.
