= Samantha Andreas =

Mining executive

Samantha Maria Andreas is an environmental chemist and occupational health and safety expert in the mining industry of Papua New Guinea. She was the inaugural Young Achiever awardee from the first year of the Westpac Women in Business Awards, and is also a recipient of the Chevening Scholarships to study in the United Kingdom.

== Education ==
Andreas attended the University of Papua New Guinea, where she earned a Bachelor of Science degree in biochemistry. She also studied at the Papua New Guinea Institute of Banking and Business Management (PNG-IBBM) for her diploma in management, and got an advanced diploma in occupational health & safety from SAI Global – Australia.

In 2019 Andreas was one of four women from Papua New Guinea awarded the Chevening scholarship, allowing her to attend graduate school in the United Kingdom. She went to Lancaster University Management School to earn her MSc in project management. After completing her degree, Andreas stated that she wanted to work as a business analyst, striving to improve the mining industry in Papua New Guinea.

== Career ==
Andreas spent more than thirteen years working in Papua New Guinea's mining industry, the country's largest export industry. She has held a number of positions, many of them at senior levels, at Ok Tedi Mining Ltd. (OTML) Her first OTML position was in their Graduate Development Program, working in the Environment Department as a graduate chemist. She subsequently held positions in occupational health and safety, EHSM SAP solution, project management, and business improvement. Her final role before moving to the UK to study was as OTML's processing improvement advisor.

When Andreas was recognized in 2008 by Westpac's Women in Business Awards, as a Young Achiever, it was in recognition as the work she had undertaken to upgrade her employer's safety systems. Starting in 2013, as the superintendent of the Occupational Health and Safety Systems and Programs of the Occupational Health and Safety Department, Andreas was the co-organizer of a multi-day, annual mining safety event especially for children whose parents worked in the mines.

Additionally, she worked on Ok Tedi Women's Network, a program focused on addressing issues of relevance to the company's female employees.
