= Tabubil =

- Location within Papua New Guinea
- Coordinates: 5°16′30″S 141°13′35″E
- Country: Papua New Guinea
- Province: Western Province
- District: North Fly
- LLG: Star Mountains Rural
- Established: 1972
- Elevation: 457 m (1,499 ft)

Population (2011)
  - Total: 10,270

Languages
  - Main languages: Tok Pisin, English
  - Traditional language: Ok languages
- Time zone: UTC+10 (AEST)

Tabubil is a town located in the Star Mountains area of the North Fly District of Western Province, Papua New Guinea. The town, including the adjoining relocated village of Wangabin and the industrial area of Laydown (where industrial equipment was originally laid down before being installed at the mine ~1970–1980), is the largest settlement in the province, although the provincial capital, Daru is a similar size. It had a recorded population of 10,270 at the 2011 census.

Tabubil is set in dense jungle fed by one of the highest rainfalls in the world. The town is the largest settlement in the country that has never been a provincial capital, or incorporated within one. The town was established primarily to serve the Ok Tedi Mine, which is currently mining copper and gold.

== History ==
=== Pre-colonisation ===
Tabubil lies in the heart of the Min Nation, an area with a distinct ethnic makeup that straddles the Indonesian border, and extends towards the southern Sepik areas and throughout the northern Fly River system. During the early years of colonisation of New Guinea it was unknown how many people, if any, lived in this remote, impassable and inhospitable terrain.

Before the 1940s, outside contact with the Min people was either brief, or merely vicarious. It is thought the Min were pushed north hundreds or even thousands of years ago by war with the southern Gogodala peoples, who were a warrior nation that currently reside on the plains of the central Fly area of the Western Province.

=== Colonisation of Telefomin ===
It was not until 1943 that United States Army Air Forces gliders landed in the Star Mountains to establish an airstrip station in what is now Telefomin, about 25 km north-east of Tabubil. This is the first permanent colonial influence on the Min people, who at the time were cannibals involved in a tribal war. Soon after the arrival of the Americans, the Telefolmin tribe experienced a cessation of hostilities with its neighbours, the Falamin and the Tifalmin due to mutually agreeable conditions that emerged from the construction and introduction of western goods and services. Conflict between social groups was also forcefully deterred by Australian colonial administrators. After colonial pacification, trade flourished in the area.

=== Mining town ===
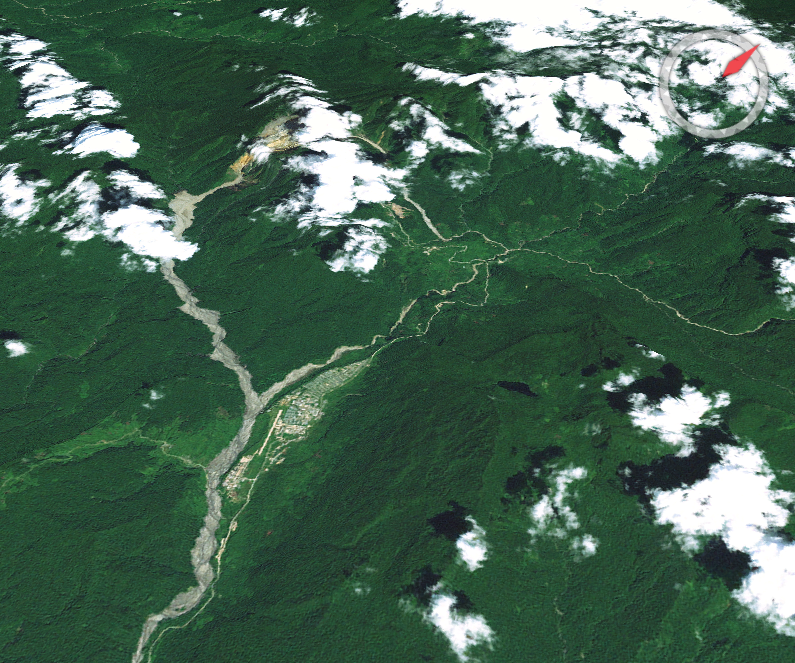
NASA Landsat image of Tabubil with a North-West perspective and Ok Tedi Mine in the background.

Tabubil, originally a small camp surrounding an airstrip, was set up as a base of operations for drilling sites by the Kennecott Copper Corporation. In 1976, Australian mining company BHP entered into negotiations with the Papua New Guinea government in an attempt to gain control of the camp and establish it as a gold mining town. BHP was successful in 1980, and in 1981, Ok Tedi Mining was established to take control of operations, with a major BHP shareholding.

Today, the old Kennecott camp is still standing. Known locally as the "A" houses, they are ATCO shipping crate styled houses. Later, the “B” and “C” houses were built by BHP for their workers. BHP has built the majority of the town, with structures placed by other companies and the national government making up a small percentage of the total buildings.

== Culture ==
Tabubil is host to a diverse range of cultures, due to its workforce historically being sourced from many parts of PNG, Australia, Asia, Europe and the Americas. Most expatriates are Australian, but there are also many Filipinos. A Canadian mining company, Inmet Mining owns an 18% stake in the mine, and of Tabubil. A number of Canadians, particularly those from Port Hardy on Vancouver Island, have also resided in Tabubil. During recent years, however, Ok Tedi Mining Limited has looked closer to home for human resources, with its long existent, but recently enforced preferred area human resourcing plan.

=== Events ===
The main cultural event of the year is Papua New Guineaʼs Independence Day. The event is proceeded by a festival known as the "Hamamas Week", meaning "joyful week", encompassing a week of traditional and contemporary dancing (arranged and performed by school students, local groups and groups from other provinces), music, and traditional ceremonies. In the 1990s, performers from other countries like Samoa and New Zealand were also invited to showcase their traditional dances for the week.

Elections are extremely important to local residents, often inciting riots, tribal conflict, and other forms of civil disobedience. The provincial government has banned the sale of alcohol during an election to try to curb violence.

Melbourne Cup day has been a well celebrated event since the foundation of the town. As many expatriate residents of the town are from Australia, Melbourne Cup celebrations have been a traditionally important connection to the culture left behind in Australia.

=== Religion ===
The most popular religion in the town is Christianity. There are still a few people that hold traditional beliefs, and others that blend traditional beliefs with Christianity.

Tabubil is host to four major permanent churches, and many other church groups that meet in the large undercover areas beneath the “B” and “C” style houses.

The Mission Aviation Fellowship has a presence in Tabubil Airport and the YMCA and YWCA hold a strong influence over the town culture and commerce.

=== Media ===
Although many people in Tabubil own computers, internet use is very rare. There is, however, a wide selection of cable TV stations available from Singapore, Australia, Indonesia, Malaysia, PNG, and the USA. There is a local TV station called OTV. Several AM and FM radio stations are available in town. Radio Fly is on shortwave frequencies 3915 kHz and 5960 kHz.

Mobile (cellular) phone and data services are provided by Telikom PNG (CitiFon) and Digicel.

== Climate ==
Tabubil has a tropical rainforest climate more subject to the Intertropical Convergence Zone than the trade winds and with no cyclones therefore equatorial. The town is known unofficially as one of the wettest places on earth, with an average annual rainfall of 8 metres or 310 inches, and a peak yearly rainfall of 10 metres or 390 inches. The unique weather conditions have caused much adaptation in the local jungle flora and fauna, causing Tabubil to be particularly interesting to the scientific community.

Tabubil often has a transient population who is unused to the large amount of rain that falls there. Locals, however, operate quite happily in the rain, as it rains daily, and residents cannot afford to let it disrupt their lives.

Climate data for Tabubil
Month	Jan	Feb	Mar	Apr	May	Jun	Jul	Aug	Sep	Oct	Nov	Dec	Year
Mean daily maximum °C (°F)	29.2 (84.6)	29.0 (84.2)	29.0 (84.2)	29.0 (84.2)	28.7 (83.7)	28.0 (82.4)	27.3 (81.1)	27.7 (81.9)	28.2 (82.8)	29.0 (84.2)	29.7 (85.5)	29.3 (84.7)	28.7 (83.6)
Daily mean °C (°F)	24.8 (76.6)	24.6 (76.3)	24.7 (76.5)	24.6 (76.3)	24.6 (76.3)	24.1 (75.4)	23.6 (74.5)	23.7 (74.7)	24.0 (75.2)	24.5 (76.1)	25.0 (77.0)	24.9 (76.8)	24.4 (76.0)
Mean daily minimum °C (°F)	20.4 (68.7)	20.3 (68.5)	20.4 (68.7)	20.3 (68.5)	20.6 (69.1)	20.2 (68.4)	20.0 (68.0)	19.8 (67.6)	19.9 (67.8)	20.0 (68.0)	20.3 (68.5)	20.5 (68.9)	20.2 (68.4)
Average rainfall mm (inches)	644 (25.4)	601 (23.7)	672 (26.5)	595 (23.4)	593 (23.3)	648 (25.5)	565 (22.2)	584 (23.0)	520 (20.5)	505 (19.9)	459 (18.1)	572 (22.5)	6,958 (274)

=== Urban design ===
Most fixed houses in northern Tabubil are designed to suit the town and its unique conditions much better than their counterparts in the south, as the “B” and “C” class houses are newer. Most of these newer houses have a large dry undercover area under the house, and are raised on stilts. Many people think the houses are on stilts due to the possibility of flooding, but they mostly provide protection from the many earthquakes in the area.

The entire town is slightly sloped on an increment towards the south. This provides excellent water runoff, which is aided by the many “floodways” which are found around town, and allow large volumes of water to cross roads. Most residents, especially on the escarpment side of town, have large ravines in their backyards which can fill up to a depth of two metres during especially wet periods, and pose a safety hazard.

Because of the large rainfall, there are many indoor sporting facilities in town. Indoor facilities for sports such as squash, indoor cricket, gymnastics, basketball, and other sports are available.

=== The climate and nature ===
In a country where biodiversity is extreme, the area around Tabubil is regarded as being especially unique. There are untold numbers of different species of birds, fish, insects, spiders, and small animals. The area around Tabubil is known for moths that grow to the size of dinner plates, bird-eating spiders and many other unique creatures. New species are being discovered constantly.

The sheer abundance of life in the area is attributed to the high rainfall. In town, many plant species, such as mint, that grow elsewhere in the world can be found in large amounts. The plants in Tabubil are larger than usual, and grow much faster than they do elsewhere.

== Economy ==
=== Ok Tedi Mine ===
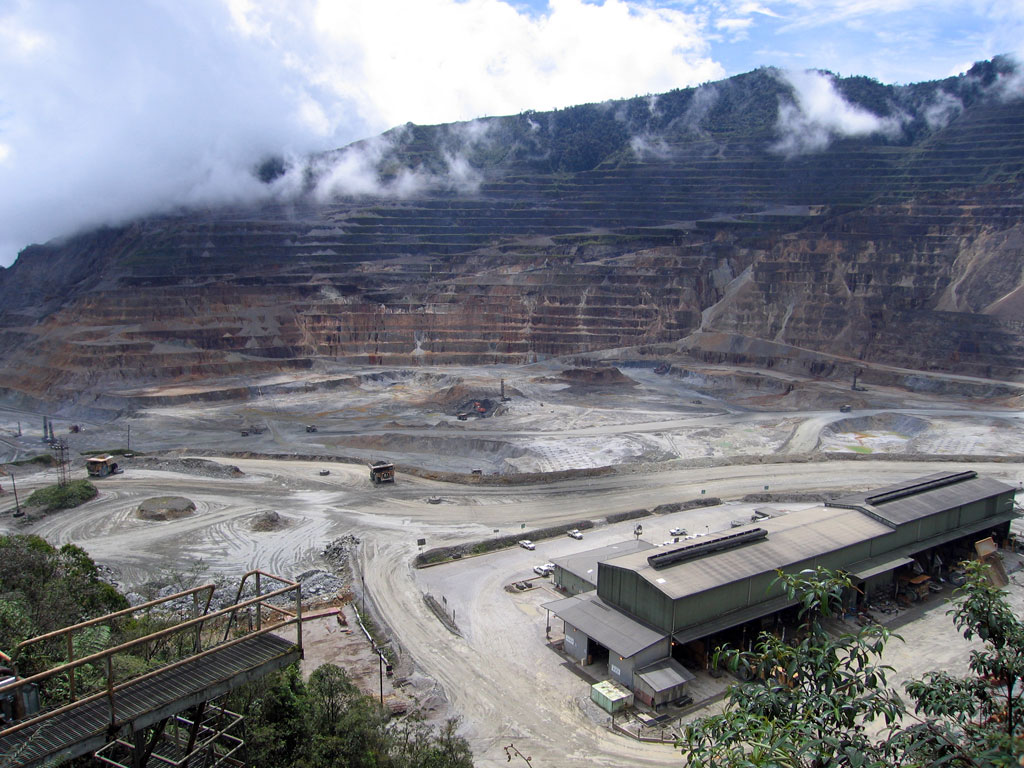
The Ok Tedi Mine site

Tabubil is the base of operations for the Ok Tedi Copper Mine, the largest economic entity in the Western Province. The mine accounts for over half of the entire province's economy and 25.7% of the country's entire export earnings. Consequently, Tabubil is the richest and most well served settlement in western Papua New Guinea.

The mine, which operates as Ok Tedi Mining was formerly owned by a joint initiative between the PNG government, and Australian mining giant, BHP. In 2002 the mine was restructured, and the PNG Sustainable Development Program now owns the BHP share.

=== Town services ===
Tabubil is serviced by a hotel, a hospital, a police station and courthouse, fire station, two primary schools (one international), a community high school, two supermarkets, a bakery, chemist, two banks, and a hardware store. Various other local businesses create an unusually westernised culture within this remote town.

Various clubs operate in the town, including the Golf Club, the Hash House Harriers, and the Gazebo club. For non drinking related recreation there is an indoor squash court, indoor cricket centre, tennis courts, a public pool, rugby fields, a gym, and many jungle tracks which may or may not be safe to walk along.

=== Commerce ===
The main commercial hub of town is in the Centre, to the northeast of the airport. This commercial district is based around a town square plan, and was host to the first ATMs, EFTPOS machines and public telephones in western Papua New Guinea. The largest store in town, the Tabubil Superstore, is located in the Centre. There is also a smaller, newer supermarket in the north of town and several smaller convenience shops known as Lik-Lik Shops after the Tok Pisin word for small.

=== Industry ===
Tabubil is powered by a hydro-electric station at Ok Menga, capable of producing 52 megawatts of electricity, and has a backup diesel power generating plant.

The main industrial hub is at the south end of the airport. This area was originally known locally as the 'Lay-Down' area, due to the fact that it was the storage location for much of the materials shipped in for the construction of the town. It is currently officially known as the ward of Laytown.

A sawmill (now disused) is located at Sawmill Creek.

== Transportation ==
Tabubil itself is situated amongst dense jungle on a plateau, beside a steep escarpment leading down to the Ok Tedi River in the Star Mountains of Papua New Guinea. The township is very remote and is only accessible via air, or river barge followed by road.

=== Air travel ===
Tabubil has an international airport (IATA code TBG) with a 1280-metre (4200 ft) dirt and gravel airstrip. Most passenger traffic is handled by daily flights to Port Moresby or Mount Hagen and tri-weekly flights to Cairns in Australia by Asia Pacific Airlines Dash 8s. Prior to the introduction of Dash 8 services, a King Air Super 200 was used for mine traffic.

Asia Pacific Airlines is a local company with head offices in Tabubil, and Airlines PNG, Mission Aviation Fellowship and Air Niugini also fly to Tabubil Regularly. Tabubil was also regularly serviced by Talair before it was disbanded.

=== Road travel ===
There are some sealed main streets in Tabubil, and several unsealed minor roads. The central north-south road in the town, separating the 'B' and 'C' houses is called "Spine Road" (known locally as “Dead End Road”), and is closed to vehicular traffic by large boulders at the end of each local road, apart from a small section at the south that is used for access to a group of townhouses. This non-vehicular road creates a well used and safe walkway through the town. Market stalls are common on this road, and there are two "lik-lik" stores adjacent to the road, and the town's only public park and playground.

All major roads are sealed and contain numerous "floodways" which allow the large amounts of rain in the town to wash over the road without obstructing traffic.

The most common form of roadkill in town is snakes, which will often stretch across the road seeking heat from the bitumen.

==== Connections to other towns ====
Tabubil is situated on the Kiunga-Tabubil Highway. One end of the highway terminates at Ok Tedi mine, about 30 km by road to the northwest. The other end of the highway terminates at the river port of Kiunga, the most northern navigable point of the Fly River, about 100 km to the south. Buses, private vehicles, and heavy trucking operations run along this route. This highway is used for transportation of supplies to the town and to the mine from barges on the Fly River. The highway is used by trucking operations heading to and from the port. Slurry of copper concentrate from the mine is sent to the river port along a 137 km pipeline which runs parallel to this highway. The Kiunga-Tabubil Highway is one of the only all-weather roads in the province, and most other roads in the district feed into this remote highway.

A road connecting Tabubil to Telefomin was opened on 12 September 2025.

=== River travel ===
Except in cases of severe drought, most supplies to the mine are delivered by barge along the Fly River, which can be accessed by a port in Kiunga on the southern terminus of the Kiunga-Tabubil Highway. All the produce from the mine and all local exports are sent from this port. The Fly river has a water level which is often too low for shipping, and barges are often banked mid-passage. River barge followed by truck is the only way to supply the township apart from air cargo.

=== Travel by foot ===
It is not uncommon for residents to access other remote areas by foot. Locals can tell you how many days it would take to walk to most locations within the country. Walking often is the only way for people to get to their local villages, as many local airstrips are in disrepair. The maintenance of airstrips is a Local Level Government responsibility, and many LLGs in the surrounding area are underfunded.

== See also ==
- Ok Tedi River
- Ok Tedi Environmental Disaster
- Kiunga-Tabubil Highway
- North Fly District, Western Province
- Ok Tedi Mine
- Western Province (Papua New Guinea)
- Kiunga, Papua New Guinea
