= Nomad Rural LLG =

Local-level government in Papua New Guinea

- District map of Western Province
- Country: Papua New Guinea
- Province: Western Province
- Time zone: UTC+10 (AEST)

Nomad Rural LLG is a local-level government (LLG) of Western Province, Papua New Guinea.

== Wards ==
- Igimi
- Mougulu
- Kofabi
- Adumari
- Ugubi
- Sefalobi
- Igibia
- Sedado
- Ugulubabi
- Sadubi
- Fuma
- Hafemi
- Yulabi
- Suabi
- Beredina
- Pipila
- Wakela
- Egebila
- Honabi
- Udugombi
- Kukudobi
- Sirigubi
- Mabomanibi
- Wasubi
- Bubusmabi
- Aeyedubi
- Tinahai
- Sinabi
- Wanbi
- Kwobi
- Testabi
- Kuda
- Debepari
- Sokabi
- Honinabi
- Nomad Station
- Dodomona
- Filisato/Banisato
