= Ningerum =

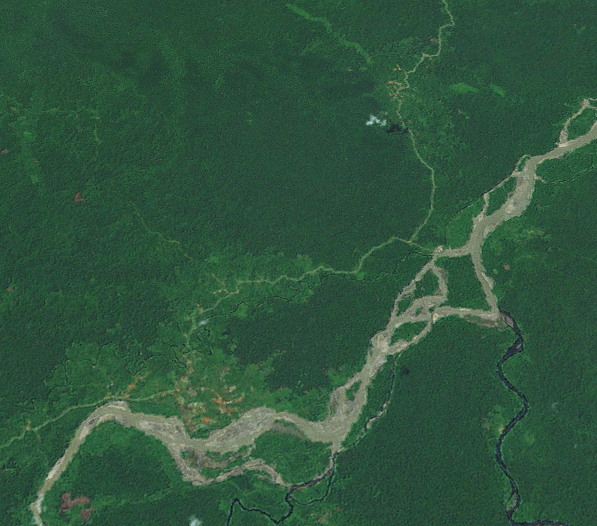
- Ningerum township from space

- Location within Papua New Guinea
- Coordinates: 5°40′S 141°8′E
- Country: Papua New Guinea
- Province: Western Province
- District: North Fly
- LLG: Niingerum Rural
- Elevation: 90 m (300 ft)

Population (2006 est)
  - Total: 5,000
  - Rank: 26th

Languages
  - Main languages: Tok Pisin, English
  - Traditional language: Ninggerum
- Time zone: UTC+10 (AEST)
- Climate: Af

Ningerum is a small town on the Kiunga-Tabubil Highway, about equidistant between the two centres of Kiunga and Tabubil. Ningerum is the seat of the Ningerum Rural LLG, which was the second most populous LLG in the North Fly District of the Western Province of Papua New Guinea during the 2000 census. The town is served by Ningerum Airport.

The township itself has a population of roughly 5000 people, a few regional stores and an airport. The Ningerum is also the name for the people inhabiting this region who are noted for their therapeutic knowledge.

== Climate ==
Ningerum has a very wet tropical rainforest climate (Köppen Af) with very heavy to extremely heavy rainfall year-round.

Climate data for Ningerum
Month	Jan	Feb	Mar	Apr	May	Jun	Jul	Aug	Sep	Oct	Nov	Dec	Year
Mean daily maximum °C (°F)	31.4 (88.5)	31.1 (88.0)	31.2 (88.2)	31.2 (88.2)	30.8 (87.4)	29.8 (85.6)	29.1 (84.4)	29.7 (85.5)	30.2 (86.4)	31.1 (88.0)	31.9 (89.4)	31.6 (88.9)	30.8 (87.4)
Daily mean °C (°F)	27.0 (80.6)	26.7 (80.1)	26.8 (80.2)	26.9 (80.4)	26.8 (80.2)	26.0 (78.8)	25.5 (77.9)	25.8 (78.4)	26.0 (78.8)	26.6 (79.9)	27.2 (81.0)	27.2 (81.0)	26.5 (79.8)
Mean daily minimum °C (°F)	22.6 (72.7)	22.4 (72.3)	22.5 (72.5)	22.6 (72.7)	22.8 (73.0)	22.3 (72.1)	22.0 (71.6)	21.9 (71.4)	21.9 (71.4)	22.1 (71.8)	22.5 (72.5)	22.8 (73.0)	22.4 (72.2)
Average rainfall mm (inches)	470 (18.5)	444 (17.5)	581 (22.9)	502 (19.8)	716 (28.2)	632 (24.9)	616 (24.3)	618 (24.3)	522 (20.6)	460 (18.1)	320 (12.6)	442 (17.4)	6,323 (249.1)
Source: Climate-Data.org

== See also ==
- Ningerum Rural LLG
