= Hindenburg Range =

Mountain range in Papua New Guinean

- Location within Papua New Guinea

Geography
- State: Papua New Guinea
- Range coordinates: 5°15′S 141°23′E
- Parent range: Island of New Guinea

The Hindenburg Range is a mountain range in the remote North Fly District of the Western Province of Papua New Guinea, stretching from the Star Mountains to the east. The Hindenburg Wall escarpment leads up to the range.
