= Sky Above and Mud Beneath =

1961 documentary film by Pierre Dominique Gaisseau

- Theatrical poster
- Directed by: Pierre Dominique Gaisseau
- Written by: Pierre Dominique Gaisseau
- Produced by: Arthur Cohn; René Lafuite
- Cinematography: Jean Bardes-Pages; Gilbert Sarthre
- Edited by: Georges Arnstam
- Distributed by: The Rank Organisation (France)
- Release date: May 1961
- Running time: 92 minutes
- Country: France
- Language: French
- Box office: $1.1 million (US/Canada)

Sky Above and Mud Beneath (French: Le Ciel et la boue, lit. 'the sky and the mud'), also released as The Sky Above –The Mud Below, is a 1961 French documentary film. It won the Academy Award for Best Documentary Feature and was entered into the 1961 Cannes Film Festival.

The film documented a 7-month, thousand-mile Franco-Dutch expedition led by Pierre-Dominique Gaisseau, into uncharted territories of what was then Netherlands New Guinea. The expedition began in the northern region of the Asmat. The group interacted with tribes of cannibals, headhunters and Pygmies; battled leeches, hunger, and exhaustion; and “discovered” and named the Princess Marijke River, named after Princess Maria Christina (Marijke) of the Netherlands.

After its Academy Award win, Embassy Pictures released The Sky Above –The Mud Below in the United States in 1962.

== Cast ==
- Pierre-Dominique Gaisseau - team leader
- Gérard Delloye - co-leader
- Herve de Maigret - radio operator
- Jan Sneep - liaison officer
- Tony Saulnier-Ciolkkowski- photographer
- William Peacock - Narrator (English version)
