= Olsobip Rural LLG =

Local-level government in Papua New Guinea

- Location of Olsobip Rural LLG in North Fly district of Western Province of Papua New Guinea

- Location within Papua New Guinea
- Coordinates: 5.427°S 141.723°E
- Country: Papua New Guinea
- Province: Western Province
- Time zone: UTC+10 (AEST)

Olsobip Rural LLG is a local-level government situated in North Fly District of Western Province of Papua New Guinea. In the year 2000, the LLG was the least populous of the district, with a population of only 3851 people. The capital of the LLG is a station town by the name of Olsobip.

== Wards ==
- 01. Bolangun
- 02. Kongabip
- 03. Laubip
- 04. Imigabip
- 05. Duwinim/Tamtem
- 06. Golgobip
- 07. Bolibip
- 08. Darabik
- 09. Duminak
- 10. Biangabip
- 11. Selbang
- 12. Seltamin
- 13. Fagobip
- 14. Saganabip
- 15. Yasap
- 16. Dahamo
