= Kiunga Rural LLG =

Local-level government in Papua New Guinea

- Location of Kiunga Rural LLG in North Fly district of Western Province of Papua New Guinea
- Country: Papua New Guinea
- Province: Western Province
- City: Kiunga
- Time zone: UTC+10 (AEST)

Kiunga Rural LLG is a local-level government area situated in North Fly District of Western Province of Papua New Guinea. In the year 2000, the LLG had a population of 13,249 people.

Inside the Kiunga Rural LLG is Rumginae District Hospital, Rumginae School of Nursing, Rumginae Elementary School, Rumginae Primary School

The township of Kiunga is within the boundaries of this LLG, but has its own urban LLG.[1][2]

The Kiunga genus of fish is named after the LLG and town of Kiunga.

== Wards ==
- 01. Briompene
- 02. Timindemasok
- 03. Atkamba
- 04. Dome
- 05. Gi
- 06. Gre
- 07. Griengas
- 08. Drindamasuk
- 09. Drimgas
- 10. Gasuke
- 11. Gusiore
- 12. Timingondok
- 13. Drimskai
- 14. Timinsiriap
- 15. Kukujaba
- 16. Membok
- 17. Erekta
- 18. Moian
- 19. Komokpin
- 20. Menumsore
- 21. Miasomnai
- 22. Tiomnai
- 23. Konkonda
- 24. Yulawas
- 25. Diabi
- 26. Dabike
- 27. Ieran
- 28. Iogi
- 29. Ralengre
- 30. Tamifen
- 31. Refugee Settlement
