= Ningerum Rural LLG =

Local-level government in Papua New Guinea

- Location of Ningerum Rural LLG in North Fly district of Western Province of Papua New Guinea
- Country: Papua New Guinea
- Province: Western Province
- Time zone: UTC+10 (AEST)

Ningerum Rural LLG is a local-level government area situated in North Fly District of Western Province of Papua New Guinea. In the year 2000, the LLG had a population of 13,156 people. The main population centre is Ningerum.

== Wards ==
- 01. Ambaga
- 02. Kungim
- 03. Tengkim
- 04. Hukim / Ok Ao Station
- 05. Tarakbits
- 06. Okgun/Ambre
- 07. Kwikim
- 08. Bankim No. 1
- 09. Wulimkanatgo
- 10. Kolebon
- 11. Wogam
- 12. Hoirenkia
- 13. Sisimakam
- 14. Mohomtienai
- 15. Runai
- 16. Hawenai
- 17. Tmoknai
- 18. Sonai
- 19. Pampenai
- 20. Yenkenai
- 21. Matkomrae
- 22. Dande
- 23. Miamrae
- 24. Ningerum Station
