= Kiunga-Tabubil Highway =

Route information
- Maintained by Ok Tedi Mining Limited
- Length: 137 km (85 mi)

Major junctions
- North end: Ok Tedi Mine, Western Province
- South end: Kiunga, Western Province

Location
- Country: Papua New Guinea
- Major cities: Tabubil, Ningerum

Highway system
- Transport in Papua New Guinea

The Kiunga-Tabubil Highway is an all-weather gravel road that runs from the river port town of Kiunga through Ningerum and Tabubil to the Ok Tedi Mine site, in the remote North Fly District of the Western Province of Papua New Guinea. The road is around 137 kilometres (85 mi) long, but this changes as sections are reconfigured.

Currently the Kiunga-Tabubil Highway is being sealed and as of 17 December 2024 the road is sealed from Kiunga Town to KM 25.

The road was built in the early 1980s. It is maintained by Ok Tedi Mining Limited, who are the greatest beneficiaries of the road. The road, for the most part, runs parallel with the Ok Tedi River, which is an incredibly fast-moving and volatile river since it is a high-volume waterway resting on a sand bank. Parts of the road are often consumed by the river and need to be rebuilt. The cost of maintaining this road is K1.5 million a year, in a region where people have an average annual income of about K50 a year. In 2019 it was announced that the road would be sealed over three years by OTML under the government tax credit scheme at an estimated cost of K100 million.

There is a copper slurry pipeline running along the full length of the road from the mine site north of Tabubil down to Bige.

A road connecting Tabubil to Telefomin was opened on 12 September 2025.

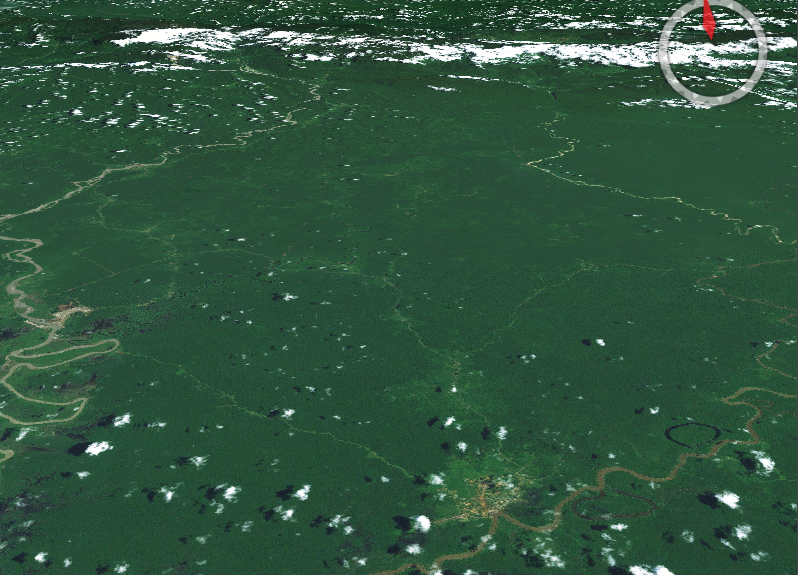
Kiunga, with the Fly River in the foreground, right, Ningerum station, Tabubil and the Ok Tedi River shown top left/left. The Kiunga-Tabubil Highway runs throughout the centre of this image.
