= Daru Urban LLG =

Local-level government in Papua New Guinea

Daru Rural LLG
- District map of Western Province
- Country: Papua New Guinea
- Province: Western Province
- Time zone: UTC+10 (AEST)

Daru Urban LLG is a local-level government (LLG) of Western Province, Papua New Guinea.

== Wards ==
- 83. Daru Town

== See also ==
- Daru Airport
- Daru Island
