= Mogulu (town) =

- Town
- Location in Papua New Guinea
- Coordinates: 6°16′50″S 142°25′20″E
- Country: Papua New Guinea
- Province: Western Province

Mogulu, or Mougulu, is a populated place in the Western Province of Papua New Guinea. It has an airstrip.
