= Ok Tedi Mine =

Copper and gold mine in Papua New Guinea

Coordinates: 05°13′22″S 141°08′19″E

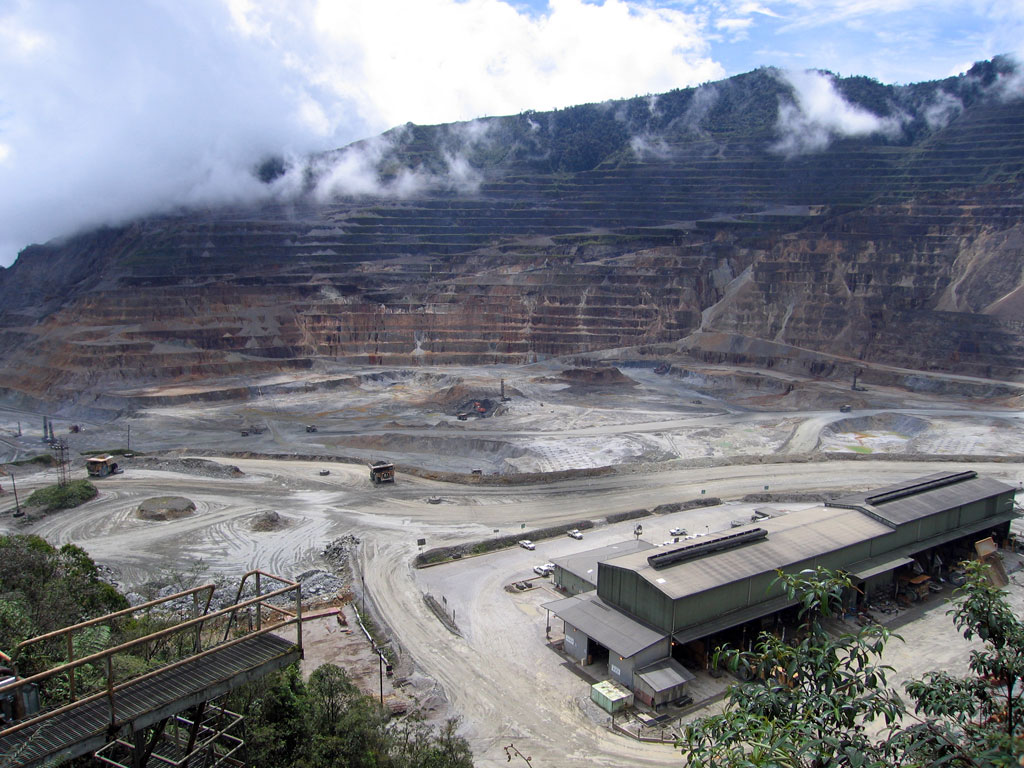
The Ok Tedi Mine

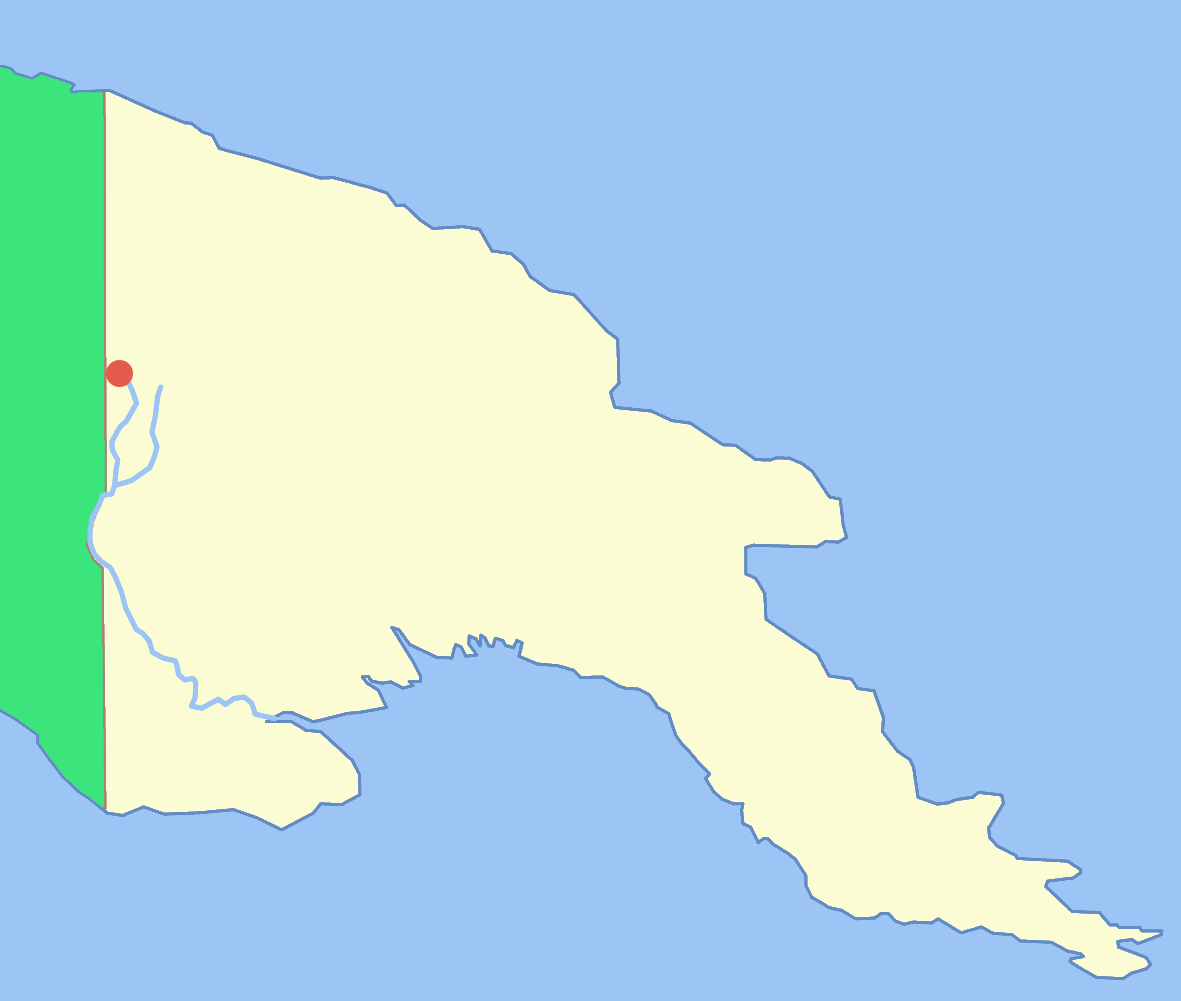
Location of the mine

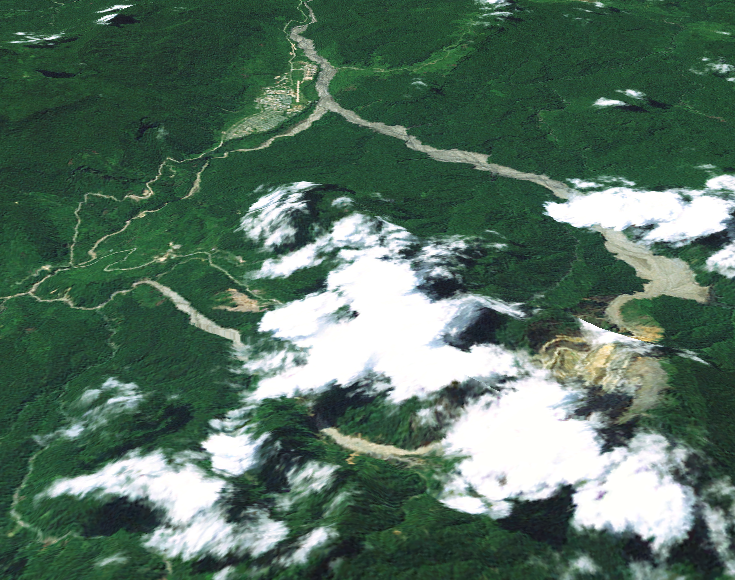
Image of Mount Fubilan, Finalbin and Tabubil

The Ok Tedi Mine is an open-pit copper and gold mine in Papua New Guinea located near the headwaters of the Ok Tedi River, in the Star Mountains Rural LLG of the North Fly District of the Western Province of Papua New Guinea.

The mine is operated by Ok Tedi Mining (OTM), which is majority-owned by the PNG Sustainable Development Program Limited (PNGSDPL). In 2013 it was nationalised by the Government of Papua New Guinea in controversial action. Prior to 2002, it was majority owned by BHP Billiton, the largest mining company in the world since a merger in 2001.

Located in a remote area of PNG, above 2,000 m (6,600 ft) on Mount Fubilan, in a region of high rainfall and frequent earthquakes, mine development posed serious challenges. The town of Tabubil was built to serve the mining operation.

== History ==
Before mining operations, Mount Fubilan was described as a copper mountain with a gold cap. Exploratory drilling in the area began in the 1970s, and was run by the Kennecott Copper Corporation.

In the early 1980s, BHP secured a mining lease. The first gold was mined at Ok Tedi in 1981. Bechtel, in a joint venture agreement, provided engineering, procurement, and construction services. In 1984, BHP began exploiting the gold cap by using cyanide extraction procedures. After the gold deposit was depleted, the company surveyed for mining the much larger copper deposit underneath. At that time, this deposit was believed to be the largest copper deposit in the world. BHP entered into a partnership with the Government of Papua New Guinea, Amoco and Inmet Mining, to mine the copper deposit. BHP maintained a majority share in the mine.

In 2002, BHP Billiton completed its withdrawal from the project by transferring its majority shareholding to the PNG Sustainable Development Program in response to the ongoing Ok Tedi environmental disaster. After the transfer, project shareholding was as follows: PNG Sustainable Development Program Limited (52%), the State of Papua New Guinea (30%) and Inmet Mining Corporation (18%).

All mining operations at Fubilan have had their headquarters at Tabubil.

== Infrastructure ==
As a substantial economic entity in Papua New Guinea and the Western Province, accounting for over half of the entire province's economy and 25.7% of the country's entire export earnings, the mine has been responsible for a large amount of the infrastructure.

=== The mine ===
The mine works as an open cut operation and Mount Fubilan has been reduced to a deep pit in the ground in the course of the excavation of the Ok Tedi Mine.

By 31 December 2004, 8,896,577 tonnes of copper concentrate (containing 2,853,265 tonnes of copper metal and 7,035,477 troy ounces or 218.8278 tonnes of gold metal) had been mined. In addition, between 1985 and 1990, 47.642 tonnes (1,531,700 ounces) of gold bullion were produced.

=== The mill ===
There is a mill adjacent to the mine that transforms the raw material mined into copper concentrate slurry plus a small quantity of gold. The mill operates two sag mills each with two associated ball mills. Copper concentrate is produced as slurry and piped 137 kilometres (85 mi) along the Kiunga-Tabubil Highway to Kiunga, the main port of the district, where it is shipped via river barge along the Fly River.

=== Ok Menga ===
The mine is powered by a hydroelectric power facility at Ok Menga, which is a tributary of the Ok Tedi River near Tabubil. There are also backup diesel generators that are used if the flow from the Ok Menga river is not enough to generate sufficient electricity.

=== Kiunga-Tabubil Highway ===
The Kiunga-Tabubil Highway is maintained by Ok Tedi Mining, as the mine is the greatest beneficiary of the road. The highway, for the most part, runs parallel with the Ok Tedi River. Parts of the highway are often consumed by the river and need to be rebuilt. The cost of maintaining this road is K1.5 million a year. The copper slurry pipeline to Kiunga from the mine runs along the full length of this road.

=== Tabubil ===
Tabubil is a township in the North Fly District of Western Province, Papua New Guinea, about 20 kilometres (12 mi) south along the Kiunga-Tabubil Highway from the minesite. The town, including the adjoining relocated village of Wangbin and the industrial area of Laytown, is the largest settlement in the province. Although the provincial capital, Daru, is almost the same size.

The town was established primarily to serve the Ok Tedi Mine. The OTM headquarters are located in a building called the White House, which is about 500 metres (1,600 ft) south of Tabubil International School, and about 300 metres (980 ft) east of the Cloudlands hotel.

The mine has a backup diesel generating power facility at Tabubil.

=== Kiunga ===
Kiunga is the port town that services the mine on the Fly River. The township, which had a population of 8,300 in the year 2000 census, is the terminus of the Kiunga-Tabubil Highway, and the copper concentrate slurry pipeline, about 140 kilometres (87 mi) by road from the minesite.

Local industry rests on a cornerstone of freight and haulage, particularly servicing the mine and the town of Tabubil. The town is the headquarters of the North Fly District.

== Environmental impact ==
In 1999, BHP reported that the project was the cause of "major environmental damage". The mine operators discharge 80 million tons of contaminated tailings, overburden and mine-induced erosion into the river system each year.

The discharge caused widespread and diverse harm, both environmentally and socially, to the 50,000 people who live in the 120 villages downstream of the mine. Chemicals from the tailings killed or contaminated fish, which subsequently caused harm to all animal species that live in the area as well as the indigenous people. The dumping changed the riverbed, causing a relatively deep and slow river to become shallower and develop rapids thereby disrupting indigenous transportation routes. Flooding caused by the raised riverbed left a thick layer of contaminated mud on the flood plain where the plantations of taro, bananas and sago palm that are the staples of the local diet grow.

About 1,300 square kilometres (500 mi^{2}) were damaged in this way. Although the concentration of copper in the water is about 30 times above the standard level, it is still below the World Health Organization (WHO) standards. Concerns have been raised of potential impact of the mine waste on the northern Great Barrier Reef, which is located offshore from the river mouth. Sediment core samples collected from the Fly Delta in 1990 showed no detectable increase in copper concentration above background levels.

The United Nations Environment Programme has noted that the Ok Tedi mine site's "uncontrolled discharge of 70 million tonnes of waste rock and mine tailings annually has spread more than 10 km (6.2 mi) down the Ok Tedi and Fly rivers, raising river beds and causing flooding, sediment deposition, forest damage, and a serious decline in the area's biodiversity." The resulting devastation caused by the mining of Ok Tedi has included the loss of fish, a vital food source for the local community; loss of forest and crops due to flooding; and the loss of "areas of deep spiritual value for villagers are now submerged in mine tailings."

== Anthropological impact ==
The Ok Tedi Mine is located in the area of the Wopkaimin people, who previously had limited exposure to the Western world. During the regulatory process for evaluation the socio-ecological impact of the Ok Tedi Mine, negotiators for the government of Papua New Guinea were ill-equipped to deal with the scale and scope of the project. The national government rejected all studies examining the social impact of the mine, and allocated a woefully inadequate amount of money for environmental studies. As the negotiations for the mine were ongoing, Ok Tedi Mining sought to depict the local Wopkaimin people in a primitive light. In developing promotional material for the mine, Ok Tedi Mining mocked Wopkaimin "primitivism", and hired an ethnically Wopkaimin community relations employee who would partially de-robe for promotional materials so to make the tribe look less advanced. Ultimately, the government and Ok Tedi Mining agreed to compensate the indigenous Wopkaimin people with one kina per person, per day, and agreed that the Wopkaimin would undergo a transition from "traditional" to "modern".

The Wopkaimin people traditionally depended on a subsistence-focused organization of production, however, this was severely disturbed by the presence of the mine. Approximately half of Wopkaimin men worked for Bechtel as construction workers from 1981 to 1984, mostly for low wages. Upon completion of the mine in 1984, these men were laid off en masse, and local Wopkaimin people began referring to the mine as the "place without work". Women's economic role was also severely impacted by this, as the traditionally female role of subsistence yam farming largely fell outside of this new capitalist system.

The construction of the mine also introduced the Wopkaimin to alcohol, specifically in the form of beer, which spawned social unrest.

Initially, many Wopkaimin responded to outside efforts to convert them into Christianity by decentralizing their indigenous religion. During the early 1980s, many Wopkaimin continued rituals associated with their indigenous religion as a form of protest against the anthropological and environmental impacts of the mine. The Wopkaimin traditionally placed a special emphasis on songwriting and singing. However, by 1984, Christian missionaries had converted a substantial number of the Wopkaimin people to Christianity, and had prevented them from singing traditional songs.

== See also ==
- Porgera Gold Mine
- Wopkaimin people
