= Star Mountains Rural LLG =

Local-level government in Papua New Guinea

- Location of The Star Mountains Rural LLG in North Fly district of Western Province of Papua New Guinea
- Country: Papua New Guinea
- Province: Western Province
- Time zone: UTC+10 (AEST)

Star Mountains Rural LLG is a local-level government situated in the Star Mountains in North Fly District of Western Province of Papua New Guinea. In the year 2000, the LLG had 1691 homes, and a population of 12,114 people. (6776 men and 5338 women) The current population is more likely to now be around 15,000 people. The main population centre in the LLG is Tabubil. Finalbin and the Ok Tedi Mine are also in this LLG.

Neighboring Pegunungan Bintang Regency (meaning 'Star Mountains' in Indonesian) in Indonesia is also similarly named.

== Wards ==
- 01. Atemkit
- 02. Kavorabip
- 03. Bultem
- 04. Finalbin
- 05. Wangbin
- 06. Migalsimbip
- 07. Niosikwi
- 08. Ok Tedi Tau
- 09. Kumkit
- 10. Ankits
- 11. Kawemtigin
- 12. Korokit
- 82. Tabubil Town
