= Kiunga (fish) =

Scientific classification
- Kingdom: Animalia
- Phylum: Chordata
- Class: Actinopterygii
- Order: Atheriniformes
- Family: Pseudomugilidae
- Genus: Kiunga; G. R. Allen, 1983

Type species
- Kiunga ballochi Allen, 1983

Genus of fishes

Kiunga is a genus of blue-eyes endemic to Papua New Guinea. The generic name refers to the port town of Kiunga in western Papua New Guinea, the type of the type species, Kiunga ballochi having been collected in the vicinity of this settlement.

== Species ==
There are currently five recognized species in this genus:

- Kiunga auromarginata G. R. Allen, Unmack, Hammer & Storey, 2024
- Kiunga ballochi G. R. Allen, 1983 (Glass blue-eye)
- Kiunga bleheri G. R. Allen, 2004
- Kiunga filamentosa G. R. Allen, Unmack, Hammer & Storey, 2024
- Kiunga leucozona G. R. Allen, Unmack, Hammer & Storey, 2024
