= Kiunga Urban LLG =

Local-level government in Papua New Guinea

- Location of Kiunga Urban LLG in North Fly district of Western Province of Papua New Guinea
- Country: Papua New Guinea
- Province: Western Province
- City: Kiunga
- Time zone: UTC+10 (AEST)

Kiunga Urban LLG is a local-level government area situated in North Fly District of Western Province of Papua New Guinea. In the year 2000, the LLG had a population of 8265 people. The township of Kiunga, which is governed by this LLG is the government seat of the district.

== Wards ==
- 81. Kiunga Urban
