= Lake Murray Rural LLG =

Local-level government in Papua New Guinea

- District map of Western Province
- Country: Papua New Guinea
- Province: Western Province
- Time zone: UTC+10 (AEST)

Lake Murray Rural LLG is a local-level government (LLG) of Western Province, Papua New Guinea.

== Wards ==
- 01. Upovia
- 02. Buseki
- 03. Boimbulavu
- 04. Nago
- 05. Maka
- 06. Magipopo
- 07. Usukof No. 1
- 08. Usokof No. 2
- 09. Kapikam
- 10. Dimu
- 11. Pangoa
- 12. Tagum
- 13. Miwa No. 1
- 14. Miwa No. 2
- 15. Kusikina
- 16. Kuem
- 17. Mipan
- 18. Manda
- 19. Bosset No. 1
- 20. Bosset No. 2
- 21. Wangawanga No. 1
- 22. Wangawanga No. 2
- 23. Komovai
- 24. Kaviananga No. 1
- 25. Kaviananga No. 2
- 26. Boikmava
- 27. Levame
- 28. Lake Murray Station

== See also ==
- Lake Murray (Papua New Guinea)
- Lake Murray Airport
