= Ok Tedi environmental disaster =

Event in Papua New Guinea

Coordinates: 5.2114°S 141.1395°E

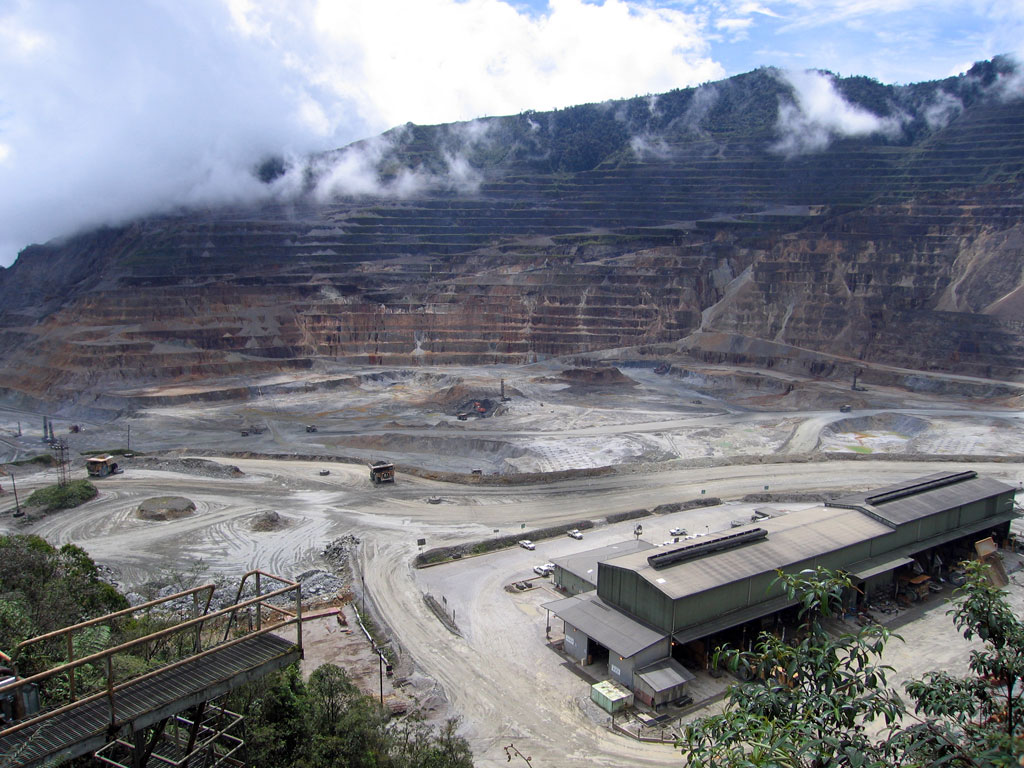
Ok Tedi Mine

The Ok Tedi environmental disaster caused severe harm to the environment along 1,000 km (620 mi) of the Ok Tedi River and the Fly River in the Western Province of Papua New Guinea from 1984 to 2013, with the damage still ongoing. The lives of 50,000 people have been disrupted by the disaster. One of the worst environmental disasters caused by humans, it is a consequence of the discharge of about two billion tons of untreated mining waste into the Ok Tedi from the Ok Tedi Mine, an open pit mine situated in the province.

This mining pollution, caused by the collapse of the Ok Tedi tailings dam system in 1984 and the consequent switch to riverine disposal (disposal of tailings directly into the river) for several decades, was the subject of class action litigation brought by local landowners naming Ok Tedi Mining and BHP Billiton. Villagers downstream from Ok Tedi in the Fly River system in the Middle Fly District and the southern and central areas of the North Fly District in particular believe that the effect on their livelihood from this disaster far outweighs the benefits they have received from the mine's presence in their area.

== Environmental impact ==
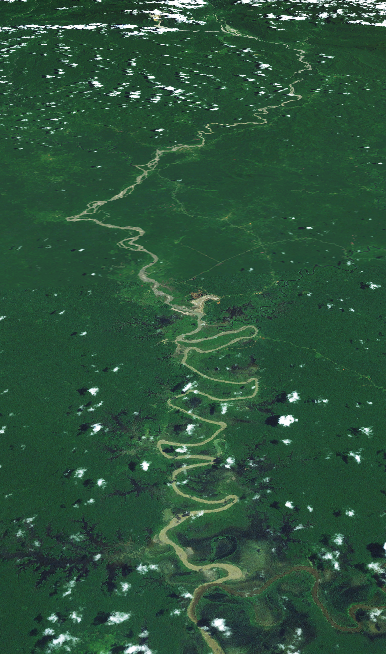
Ok Tedi River circa 2007

In 1999, BHP reported that 90 million tons of mine waste was annually discharged into the river for more than ten years and destroyed downstream villages, agriculture and fisheries. Mine wastes were deposited along 1,000 km (620 mi) of the Ok Tedi and the Fly River below its confluence with the Ok Tedi, and over an area of 100 km^{2} (39 sq mi). BHP's CEO, Paul Anderson, said that the Ok Tedi Mine was "not compatible with our environmental values and the company should never have become involved." As of 2006, mine operators continued to discharge 80 million tons of tailings, overburden, and mine-induced erosion into the river system each year. About 1,588 km^{2} (613 sq mi) of forest has died or is under stress. As many as 3,000 km^{2} (1,200 sq mi) may eventually be harmed, an area equal to the U.S. state of Rhode Island or the Danish island of Funen.

Following heavy rainfall, mine tailings are swept into the surrounding rainforest, swamps, and creeks, and have left behind 30 km^{2} of dead forest. Thick gray sludge from the mine is visible throughout the Fly River system, although its effects downriver are not as severe. Chemicals from the tailings killed or contaminated fish, although they are still eaten by the people of the surrounding villages. However, fish counts decrease closer to the mine. The massive amount of mine-derived waste dumped into the river exceeded its carrying capacity. This dumping resulted in the river bed being raised by 10 m, causing a relatively deep and slow river to become shallower and develop rapids, thereby disrupting indigenous transportation routes. Flooding, caused by the raised riverbed, left a thick layer of contaminated mud on the flood plain among plantations of taro, bananas, and sago palm that are the staples of the local diet. About 1300 km^{2} were damaged in this way. The concentration of copper in the water is about 30 times above the standard level, but it is below the World Health Organization standards.

The original plans included an Environmental Impact Statement that required a tailings dam be built. This would allow heavy metals and solid particles to settle, before releasing the less polluted ‘high-water’ into the river system where remaining contaminants would be diluted. In 1984 an earthquake caused the half-built dam to collapse. The company continued operations without the dam, initially because BHP argued that it would be too expensive to rebuild it. Subsequently, the Government of Papua New Guinea decided a dam was not necessary, in the wake of the closure of the Panguna mine.

Most of Papua New Guinea's land is held under a system of native title, with ownership divided amongst many small clans, while the central government retains control over how resources that lie under the ground are used.

There are no waste retention facilities on the premises. This allowed all ore processing residues, waste rock, and overburden to be discharged into the Ok Tedi River.

== Aftermath ==
In the 1990s the communities of the lower Fly Region, including the Yonggom people, sued BHP and received US$28.6 million in an out-of-court settlement, which was the culmination of an enormous public-relations campaign against the company by environmental groups. As part of the settlement, a (limited) dredging operation was put in place and efforts were made to rehabilitate the site around the mine. However the mine is still in operation and waste continues to flow into the river system. BHP was granted legal indemnity from future mine related damages.

The Ok Tedi Mine was scheduled to close in 2013. However, the PNG Government has taken over control of the mine and with support of local community, the mine life was extended. Until the future closure, two thirds of the profits are to go into a long-term fund to enable the mine to continue to contribute to the PNG economy for up to half a century after it closes. The balance is allocated to current development programs in the local area (Western Province) and PNG more generally. Experts have predicted that it will take 300 years to clean up the toxic contamination.

== Mine life extension and community support ==
In 2013, the PNG Government seized 100% ownership of Ok Tedi Mine and repealed laws that would allow people to sue mining giant BHP Billiton over environmental damage. BHP expressed confidence, stating that it had other indemnities in place that protected shareholders from future legal costs. Ok Tedi Mining launched the OT2025 project that was focused on transitioning the business to a smaller operation in preparation for Mine Life Extension.

Community consent for the mine's life to be extended to 2025 was endorsed by the Mine Associated Communities, which is made up of 156 villages, through the signing of the respective Community Mine Continuation Extension Agreements by the Community representatives and OTML at the end of 2012 and beginning of 2013. The signing of the Agreements facilitated the Company to commence planning for the MLE project throughout 2013.
