= Pierre Dominique Gaisseau =

French documentarist

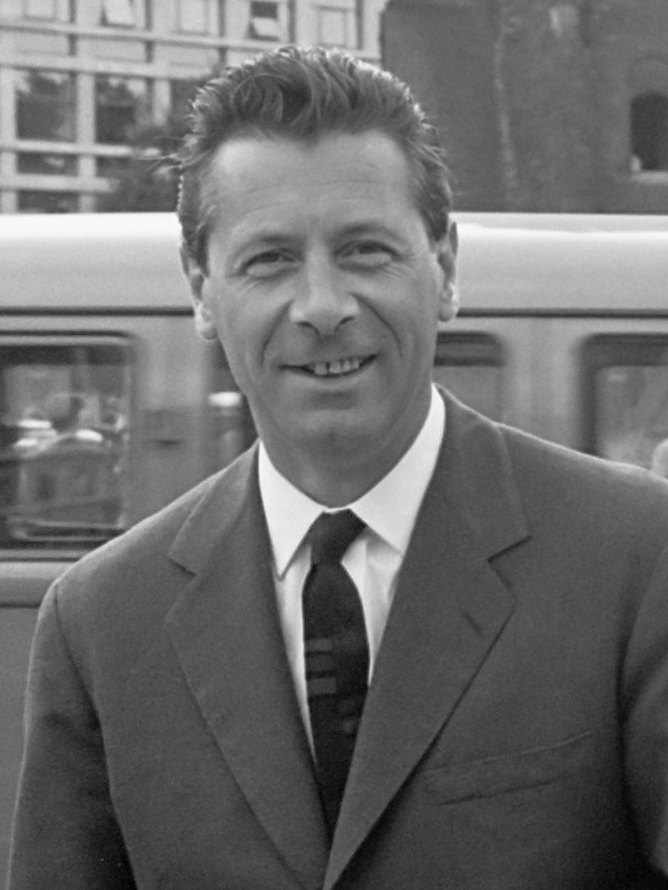
Pierre Dominique Gaisseau (1961)

Pierre Dominique Gaisseau was a French documentary film-maker best known for his documentary Sky Above and Mud Beneath, which was awarded the first Oscar for a documentary. The film is an account of an expedition into the previously unexplored wilds of the Netherlands New Guinea accomplished in 1959 by a small team of French and Dutch explorers under Gaisseau's leadership, in the area where young Michael Rockefeller later disappeared. The film's images of stone age life and mock birth rituals made indelible imprints on the Western mind, repeated in various art and theater forms.

Gaisseau's films were not limited to remote areas. "Only One New York" contained intimate glimpses of New York City's Roma subculture. After completing a best selling autobiography "Vivre Pour Voir", Gaisseau died in Paris in 1997 of a heart attack. His widow, Kyoko, died in Paris in 2010.

== Family ==
Gaisseau's first wife was Anne Marie Fichter with whom he had two children, Catherine and Nicolas. This marriage ended in divorce, and he subsequently married Kyoko Kosaka, with whom he had a daughter, Akiko Gaisseau.
