= Daru =

- Town
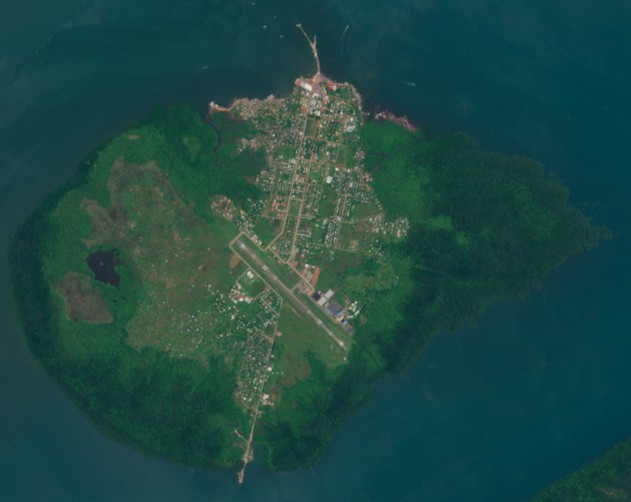

- Location in Papua New Guinea
- Coordinates: 9°05′S 143°12′E
- Country: Papua New Guinea
- Province: Western Province
- District: South Fly District
- LLG: Daru Urban
- Established: 1884
- Elevation: 3 m (9.8 ft)

Population
  - Total: 15,142
- 2011
- Time zone: UTC+10 (AEST)
- Climate: Am
- Location: 440 km (270 mi) from Port Moresby by air

Daru is the capital of the Western Province of Papua New Guinea and a former Catholic bishopric. Daru town falls under the jurisdiction of Daru Urban LLG.

The township is entirely located on an island that goes by the same name, which is located near the mouth of the Fly River on the western side of the Gulf, just north of Torres Strait and Far North Queensland in Australia. Daru had a recorded population of 15,142 as of the 2011 census.

== History ==
Galician-Portuguese explorer, Luis Vaez de Torres, in the 1600s visited the location of the current town.

== Population ==
The language of the Daru people is Kiwai (South-West Coastal Kiwai), also spoken on neighbouring mainland villages (the name Kiwai comes from Kiwai Island some 60 km north-east in the Fly River delta). However, the Kiwai settlement of Daru is fairly recent. The original inhabitants, the Hiamo, were Western-Central Torres Strait Islanders originally from Yama in the Torres Strait. With the Kiwai colonisations, the main group of Hiamo people moved to Southern Torres Strait and settled the (Inner) Muralag group.

== Religion ==
Its St. Louis de Montfort Co-Cathedral is the 'second see' (and former 'full' cathedral) of the Roman Catholic Diocese of Daru-Kiunga (renamed in 1987, originally Apostolic Prefecture of Daru since 1957, promoted to a diocese in 1966).

== Transport ==
It is served by Daru Airport, a small airstrip.

== Climate ==
Daru has a tropical savannah climate (Köppen Aw) with heavy rainfall most of the year and low rainfall from July to October.

Climate data for Daru (1980–2007)
Month	Jan	Feb	Mar	Apr	May	Jun	Jul	Aug	Sep	Oct	Nov	Dec	Year
Mean daily maximum °C (°F)	31.3 (88.3)	31.4 (88.5)	30.8 (87.4)	30.0 (86.0)	29.4 (84.9)	28.6 (83.5)	28.0 (82.4)	28.0 (82.4)	28.9 (84.0)	29.9 (85.8)	31.1 (88.0)	31.7 (89.1)	29.9 (85.9)
Mean daily minimum °C (°F)	24.5 (76.1)	24.2 (75.6)	24.3 (75.7)	24.4 (75.9)	24.6 (76.3)	24.0 (75.2)	23.4 (74.1)	23.4 (74.1)	23.6 (74.5)	24.3 (75.7)	24.7 (76.5)	24.6 (76.3)	24.2 (75.5)
Average rainfall mm (inches)	224.2 (8.83)	257.8 (10.15)	293.8 (11.57)	411.4 (16.20)	186.8 (7.35)	63.4 (2.50)	45.9 (1.81)	32.5 (1.28)	19.5 (0.77)	21.6 (0.85)	47.9 (1.89)	202.2 (7.96)	1,807 (71.16)
Average rainy days	20	20	19	21	20	21	18	16	10	8	8	17	198
Source: World Meteorological Organization
