= Ok Tedi Mining =

OTML Logo

Ok Tedi Mining Limited is a Papua New Guinean company that administers the Ok Tedi Mine in the northern part of the Western Province. Its main office is located in Tabubil and the building is known as the White House. Its chairman, since 2014, has been former Deputy Prime Minister Moi Avei.

== Women in mining ==
Ok Tedi Women’s Network (OWN) is a local organization that works on issues affecting the company's female employees. The World Bank has studied OWN as a model for treatment of women in the mining industry. The group handles a wide range of topics, from honoring girls and women in science to critical cancer awareness.

One of Ok Tedi's senior employees and representatives to OWN, Samantha Andreas, was the Westpac Women in Business' Young Achiever award recipient in 2008.

== See also ==
- Ok Tedi environmental disaster
- Papua New Guinea
- Ok Tedi Mine
