= Western Province (Papua New Guinea) =

Province in Papua New Guinea

Western Province Westen Provins (Tok Pisin) Fly River Province
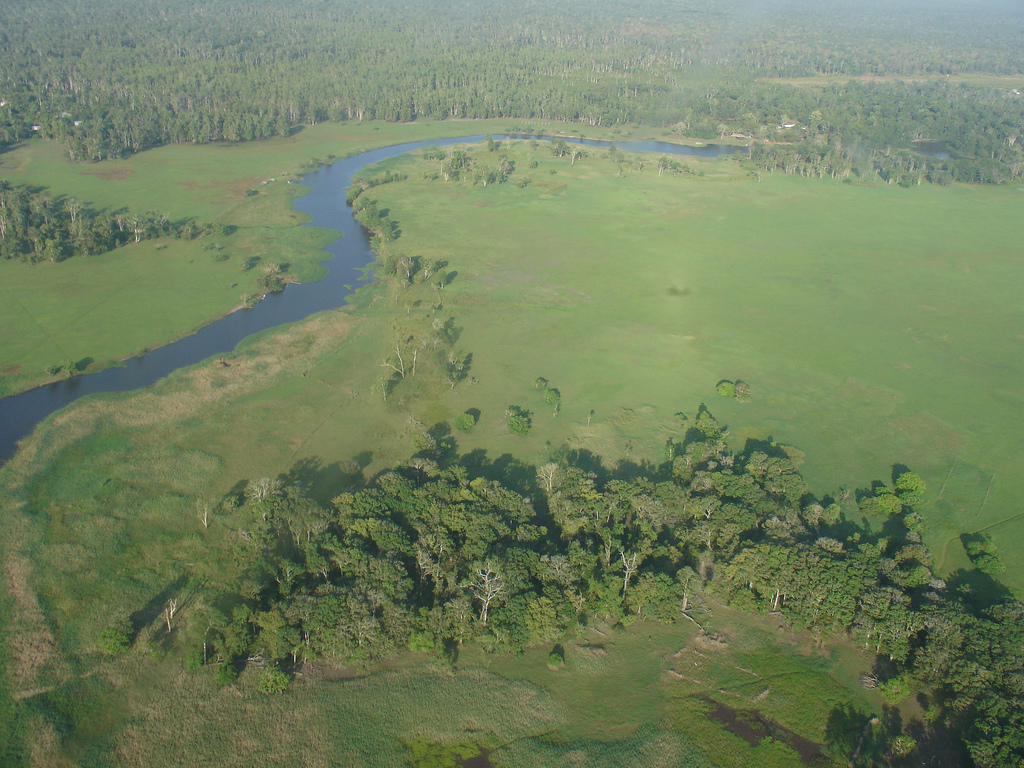

- Flag

- Western Province in Papua New Guinea
- Coordinates: 7°20′S 142°0′E
- Country: Papua New Guinea
- Capital: Daru
- Districts: List: North Fly; Middle Fly; South Fly; Delta Fly

Government
  - Governor: Taboi Awi Yoto (since 2017)

Area
  - Total: 98,189 km^{2} (37,911 sq mi)

Population (2011 census)
  - Total: 201,351
  - Density: 2.0506/km^{2} (5.3112/sq mi)
- Time zone: UTC+10 (AEST)
- HDI (2018): 0.550 medium · 11th of 22

Western Province is a coastal province in southwestern Papua New Guinea, bordering the Indonesian provinces of Highland Papua and South Papua. The provincial capital is Daru. The largest town in the province is Tabubil. Other major settlements are Kiunga, Ningerum, Olsobip and Balimo.

The provincial government has, as with the governments of North Solomons, Chimbu and Northern provinces, sought to change the name of the province. The government uses the name Fly River Provincial Government; however, this remains unofficial as it has not been changed in the Constitution of Papua New Guinea.

== Geography and ecology ==
Western Province covers 99,300 km² and is the largest province in Papua New Guinea by area. There are several large rivers that run through the province, including the Fly River and its tributaries the Strickland and Ok Tedi rivers. The largest lake in Papua New Guinea, Lake Murray, is also in Western Province.

This province is the only part of Papua New Guinea to hold land west of the 141°E line, which divides it from Indonesian Western New Guinea. This is a small section of territory bordered by the Fly River.

The Tonda Wildlife Management Area in the south-western corner of the province is a wetland of international importance. It is the largest protected area in Papua New Guinea.

The flora and fauna of much of Western Province resemble those of northern Australia. Flora includes eucalyptus, melaleuca, acacia, and banksias. Fauna includes wallabies, bandicoots, goannas, coastal taipans, and mound-building termites.

The drier, southern parts of the province have eucalyptus and melaleuca savannas (the Trans-Fly savanna and grasslands) that support large populations of birds, wallabies, and introduced deer, with dense rainforests being located to the north. The dry season is from July–November, while the wet season is from December–June. Sago cultivation dominates the wetter north, while yam cultivation dominates the drier south.

== Demographics ==
There were 201,351 inhabitants in Western Province in the 2011 census, residing in 31,322 households. Of these, 79,349 people were recorded in Middle Fly District, 62,850 in North Fly District and 59,152 in South Fly District. The average household size across the province was 6.4.

== Economy ==
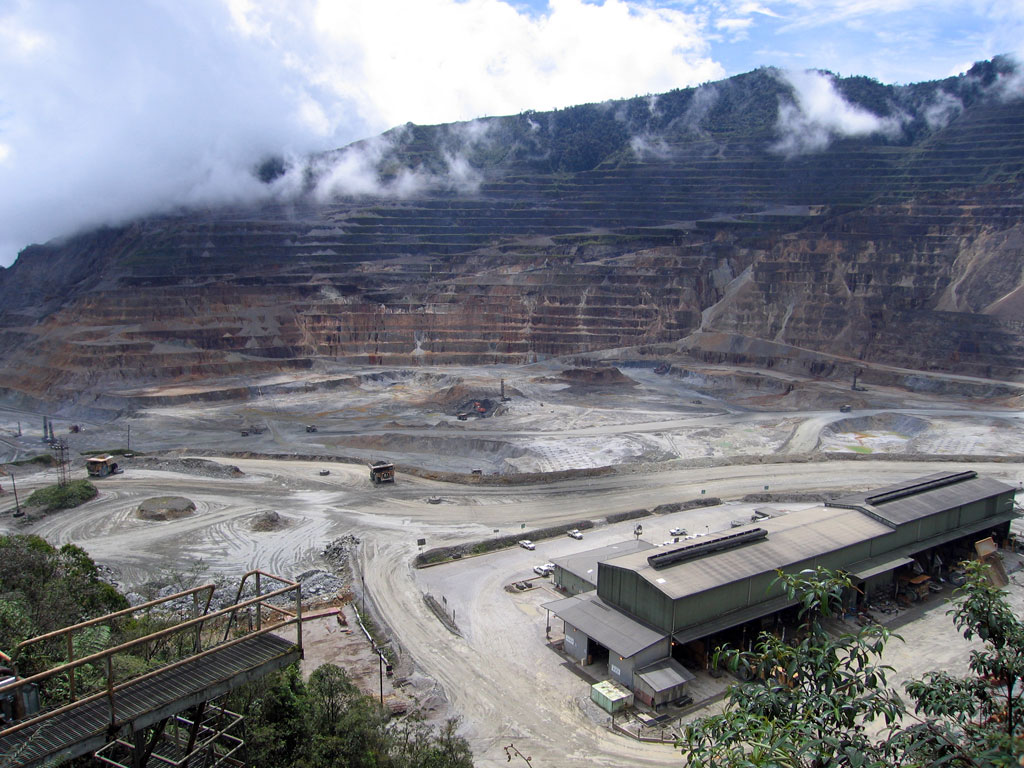
The Ok Tedi Mine

The major economic activity in the province is constituted by the Ok Tedi Mine, initially established by BHP and the subject of considerable litigation by traditional landowners both in respect of environmental degradation and disputes over royalties. It is currently operated by Ok Tedi Mining Limited (OTML).

== Districts and LLGs ==
District map of Western Province

There are three districts in the province. Each district has one or more Local Level Government (LLG) areas. For census purposes, the LLG areas are subdivided into wards and those into census units.

District	District Capital	LLG Name
North Fly District	Kiunga	Kiunga Rural
North Fly District	Kiunga	Kiunga Urban
North Fly District	Kiunga	Ningerum Rural
North Fly District	Kiunga	Olsobip Rural
North Fly District	Kiunga	Star Mountains Rural
Middle Fly District	Balimo	Balimo Urban
Middle Fly District	Balimo	Bamu Rural
Middle Fly District	Balimo	Gogodala Rural
Middle Fly District	Balimo	Lake Murray Rural
Middle Fly District	Balimo	Nomad Rural
South Fly District	Daru	Daru Urban
South Fly District	Daru	Kiwai Rural
South Fly District	Daru	Morehead Rural
South Fly District	Daru	Oriomo-Bituri Rural

== Provincial leaders ==
The province was governed by a decentralised provincial administration, headed by a Premier, from 1977 to 1995. Following reforms taking effect that year, the national government reassumed some powers, and the role of Premier was replaced by a position of Governor, to be held by the winner of the province-wide seat in the National Parliament of Papua New Guinea.

=== Premiers (1977–1995) ===
Premier	Term
Tatie Olewale	1977–1983
Semai Aitowai	1983–1985
provincial government suspended	1985–1988
Norbert Makmop	1988–1991
Isidore Kaseng	1992–1995

=== Governors (1995–present) ===
Governor	Term
Dere Wamaro	1992–1997
Norbert Makmop	1997–2002
Bob Danaya	2002–2012
Ati Wobiro	2012–2017
Taboi Awe Yoto	2017–present

== Members of the National Parliament ==
The province and each district is represented by a Member of the National Parliament. There is one provincial electorate and each district is an open electorate.

Electorate	Member
Western Provincial	Taboi Awi Yotto
Delta Fly Open	Agena Gamai
North Fly Open	James Donald
Middle Fly Open	Maso Hewabi
South Fly Open	Sekie Agisa

== See also ==
- Hindenburg Range
- Star Mountains
- Kiunga-Tabubil Highway
