= Kiunga, Papua New Guinea =

Town in Papua New Guinea

Kiunga
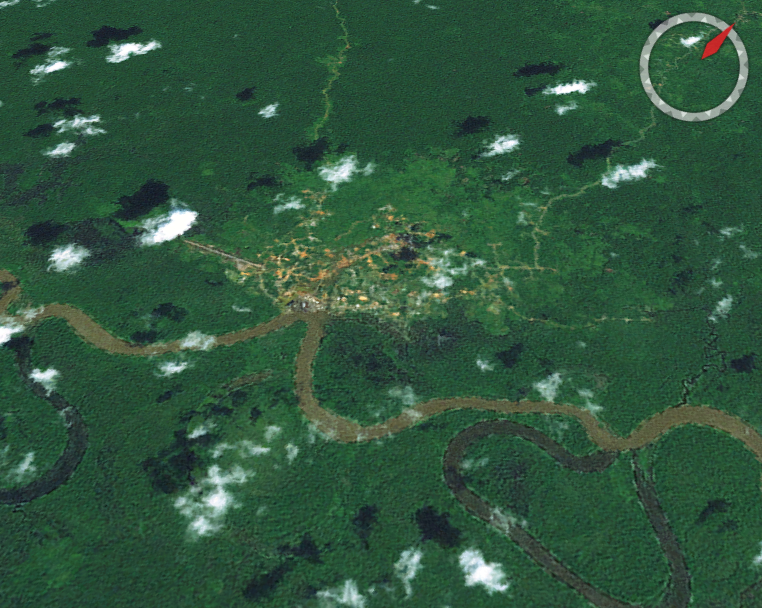
- Kiunga township from space

- Location within Papua New Guinea
- Coordinates: 6°7′S 141°18′E
- Country: Papua New Guinea
- Province: Western Province
- District: North Fly
- LLG: Kiunga Urban, Kiunga Rural
- Elevation: 33 m (108 ft)

Population (2013)
  - Total: 18,747
  - Rank: 18th

Languages
  - Main languages: Tok Pisin, English
  - Traditional language: Aekyom & Yongom
- Time zone: UTC+10 (AEST)
- Climate: Af

Kiunga is a port town on the Fly River in the Western Province of Papua New Guinea, just upstream from the D'Albertis Junction with the Ok Tedi River. It is the southernmost terminus of the Kiunga-Tabubil Highway. Local industry rests on a cornerstone of freight and haulage, particularly from the Ok Tedi Mine and provisioning for the much larger town of Tabubil. Natural rubber has been an emerging industry more recently, with a processing/manufacturing plant being built in town.

== Description ==
Kiunga-Tabubil Highway.

Surrounding swamps and rainforest lowlands are of interest to birdwatchers, with a high chance of observing crowned pigeon, yellow-eyed starling, large fig parrot and flame bowerbird as well as a large variety of more common species.

Kiunga has reliable 24-hour power. Locals are friendly, and there is no significant crime. Dial-up internet access is possible during business hours. Short term accommodation is available. Although Kiunga is accessible by road, this provides access only from Tabubil via the Kiunga-Tabubil Highway.

There are flights to and from the capital, Port Moresby, by both Airlines PNG and Air Niugini. Kiunga weather station readings are available online. Its local geology is clay on limestone.

== Population ==
According to data for 2013, the city's population was 18,747 people. Historical data is listed below.

1980	1990	2000	2013
1,400	4,000	8,265	18,747

== Climate ==
Kiunga has a tropical rainforest climate (Köppen Af) with very heavy rainfall year-round.

Climate data for Kiunga
Month	Jan	Feb	Mar	Apr	May	Jun	Jul	Aug	Sep	Oct	Nov	Dec	Year
Mean daily maximum °C (°F)	31.7 (89.1)	31.6 (88.9)	31.7 (89.1)	31.4 (88.5)	31.0 (87.8)	30.1 (86.2)	29.3 (84.7)	29.9 (85.8)	30.5 (86.9)	31.5 (88.7)	32.4 (90.3)	32.0 (89.6)	31.1 (88.0)
Daily mean °C (°F)	27.2 (81.0)	27.1 (80.8)	27.2 (81.0)	27.0 (80.6)	26.9 (80.4)	26.2 (79.2)	25.6 (78.1)	25.9 (78.6)	26.2 (79.2)	26.8 (80.2)	27.5 (81.5)	27.4 (81.3)	26.7 (80.2)
Mean daily minimum °C (°F)	22.7 (72.9)	22.6 (72.7)	22.7 (72.9)	22.7 (72.9)	22.9 (73.2)	22.4 (72.3)	22.0 (71.6)	21.9 (71.4)	22.0 (71.6)	22.1 (71.8)	22.6 (72.7)	22.9 (73.2)	22.5 (72.4)
Average rainfall mm (inches)	456 (18.0)	403 (15.9)	529 (20.8)	399 (15.7)	397 (15.6)	317 (12.5)	305 (12.0)	317 (12.5)	323 (12.7)	339 (13.3)	312 (12.3)	424 (16.7)	4,521 (178)
Source: Climate-Data.org

== See also ==
- Kiunga Urban LLG
- Kiunga Rural LLG
