= Star Mountains =

Mountain range in Papua

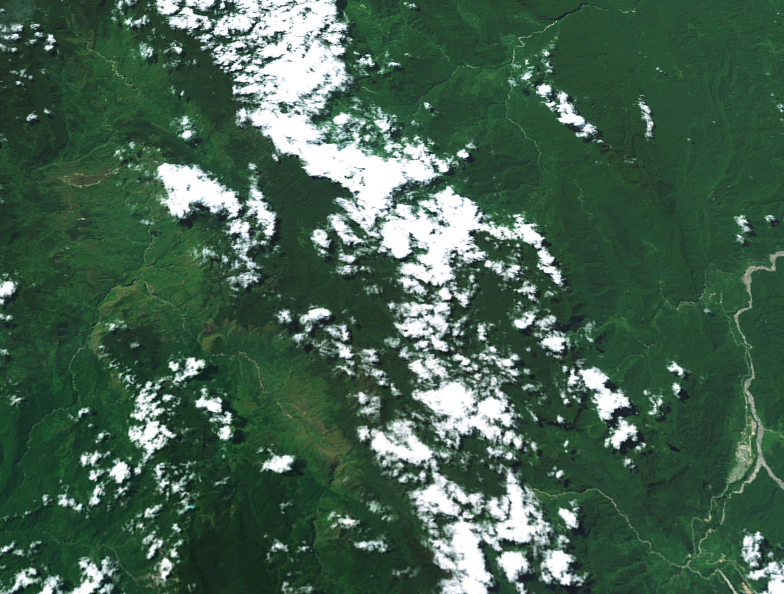
- The Star Mountains, from space. Telefomin and Tabubil can be seen clearly in this image.

Highest point
- Peak: 4,760 m (Puncak Mandala)

Geography
- Location within Papua New Guinea
- State(s): Indonesia and Papua New Guinea
- Range coordinates: 5°S 141°E
- Parent range: Island of New Guinea

The Star Mountains (Dutch (colonial): Sterrengebergte; Indonesian: Pegunungan Bintang) are a mountain range in eastern end of Highland Papua, Indonesia and the western Papua New Guinea, stretching from the eastern end of Indonesia to the Hindenburg Range in Papua New Guinea.

Mountain ranges Bintang Mountains Regency in Indonesia and Star Mountains Rural LLG in Papua New Guinea are part of this mountain range.

== History ==
The earlier Western expedition to the mountains was led by Jan Sneep, a Dutch colonial civil servant who operated from the Sibil Valley. The expedition, which started in April 1959, mapped the terrain and collected anthropological data of the people who lived in the area. The expedition used two small Bell helicopters, but the altitudes severely limited their effectiveness and one of them crashed, forcing the expedition to rely more on traditional manpower. Climbers from the expedition reached the peak of Puncak Mandala on 9 September 1959.

== Climate ==
The Star Mountains have an annual rainfall of more than 10,000 millimetres (390 in; 33 ft), and although no official scientific weather station has ever been established it has been claimed to be one of the wettest places on earth.

== Languages ==
In terms of the number of independent language families, the Star Mountains are one of the most linguistically diverse regions in New Guinea. These language families and isolates include:

- Pauwasi
  - Eastern Pauwasi
  - Western Pauwasi (Tebi–Towei)
- Kwomtari
  - Fas, Baibai
  - Guriaso
  - Kwomtari, Nai-Biaka
  - Pyu
- Border
- Kaure–Kosare
- Kapauri
- Lepki-Murkim
- Senagi (Angor-Dera)
- Tofanma-Namla
- Elseng
- Kembra
- Kimki
- Molof
- Usku
- Yetfa
