= Christian Wolkersdorfer =

German hydrogeologist (born 1964)

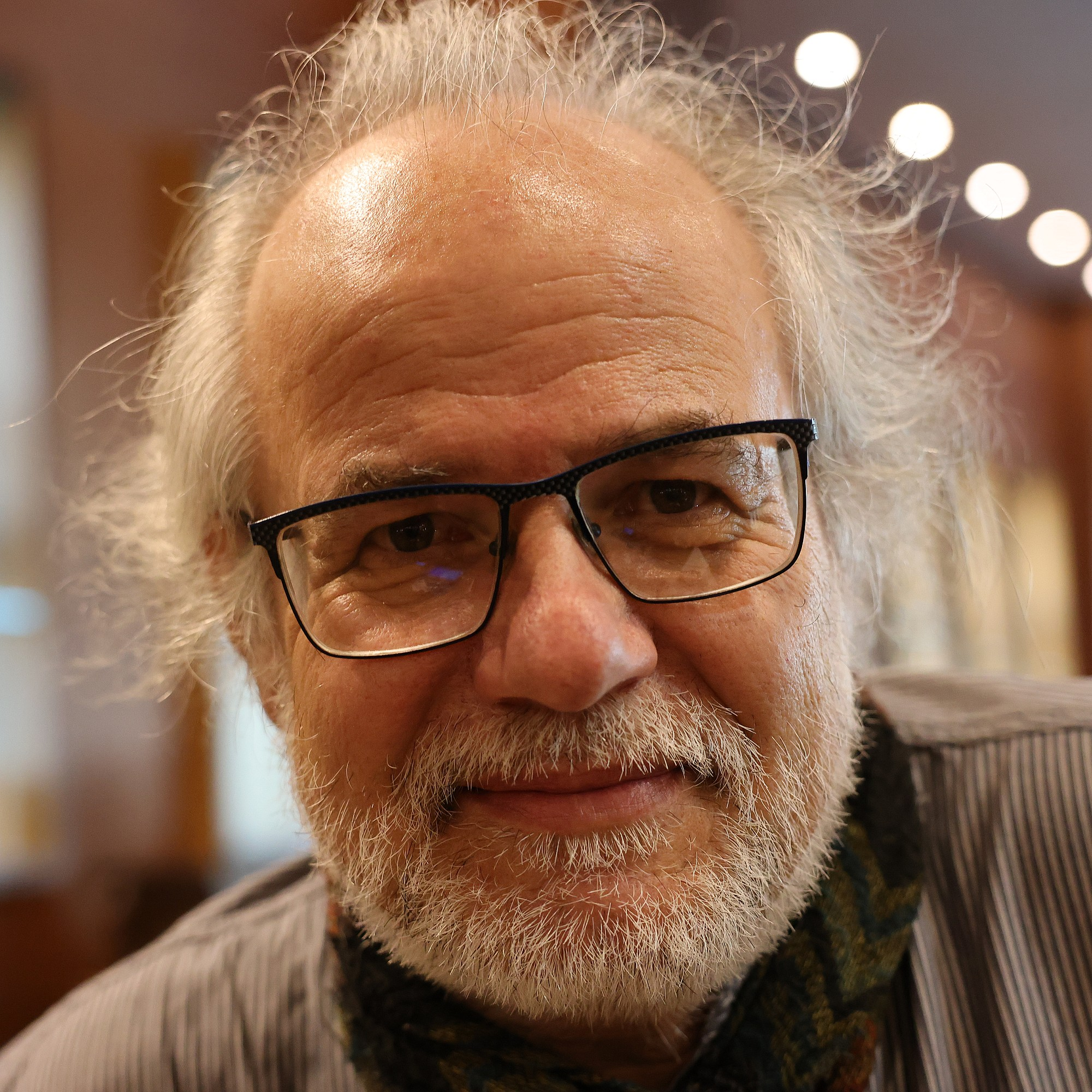
- Wolkersdorfer in 2024
- Born: 17 February 1964; Schwabach/Mittelfranken, Germany
- Education: Clausthal University of Technology
- Known for: President and member of the Executive Council International Mine Water Association, Member of the Academy of Science of South Africa (ASSAf)
- Children: Karoline, Franziska
- Scientific career
- Thesis: Hydrogeochemische Verhältnisse im Flutungswasser eines Uranbergwerks – Die Lagerstätte Niederschlema/Alberoda [Hydrogeochemical conditions in the mine water of a uranium mine – The Niederschlema/Alberoda deposit] (1996)

Christian Wolkersdorfer is a German hydrogeologist and mining hydrogeologist known for his work in mine water management and environmental remediation. He has held academic positions across Europe, North America, and Africa and contributed to research on water management in abandoned mines. He is a member of the South African Academy of Sciences as well as the President of the International Mine Water Association.

== Early life and education ==
Christian Wolkersdorfer was born in Schwabach, Mittelfranken, Germany on February 17, 1964 and grew up in Wendelstein near Nürnberg, Germany and Ehrwald/Tirol, Austria. In 1984, he completed his secondary education at Gymnasium Roth and obtained the Allgemeine Hochschulreife with a final grade of 1.8. He pursued his interest in geology by attending Friedrich-Alexander-Universität Erlangen-Nürnberg, Germany focusing on Geology and Paleontology between 1984 and 1986. He furthered his education in Applied Geology (Economic Geology) at Technische Universität Clausthal, Germany from 1986 to 1989. Then he graduated with a grade of 1.3 for his master's thesis on Lead (Pb)-Zinc (Zn) deposits in the Northern Tyrolian Mieminger Gebirge.

After finishing his formal education, Christian Wolkersdorfer served in 1990 with the Air Force in Roth, Middle Franconia, Germany. There after he worked at the Air Force Geological Survey in Karlsruhe, Germany. After completing his PhD on hydrogeochemical conditions in uranium mine water at Technical University Clausthal in November 1995, he obtained a Habilitation at TU Bergakademie Freiberg Germany, specialising in water management in abandoned underground mines.

== Career ==
Christian Wolkersdorfer started his professional career with several internships. Following his graduation, he gained employment as a computer operator before transitioning to a role as an Engineering geologist for Gesellschaft für Baugeologie und Meßtechnik Limburg, Germany. From 1991 to 1996, he worked as a research associate in Engineering geology and hydrogeology at TU Clausthal in Germany, before taking on the role of Head of the Freiberg Branch Office at Ingenieurbüro für Geotechnik Bautzen, Germany.

Wolkersdorfer began working at TU Bergakademie Freiberg as a DFG-Grant researcher and later as a postdoctoral researcher in 1999. He also participated in global research at Universidade Federal de Ouro Preto in Brazil and worked as a research fellow at the University of Newcastle in the United Kingdom. Between 2006 and 2008, he served as a professor at LMU Munich, then assumed the position of "Industrial Research Chair in Mine Water Remediation and Management" at Cape Breton University in Nova Scotia,Canada.

In 2014, Christian Wolkersdorfer was named a Finnish Distinguished Professor at LUT University and also became the South African Research Chair for Acid Mine Drainage Treatment at Tshwane University of Technology.

== Grants and research contributions ==
Christian Wolkersdorfer has been awarded several grants from different institutions, such as the Tyrolean Government and the DFG German Research Foundation, demonstrating his dedication to progressing hydrogeology and environmental management research. He has been publishing research since 1989. Christian Wolkersdorfer is an expert in mine water management, mine water tracer tests and hydrogeochemistry. He is known for his work on remediating contaminated mine water. He has written several books, including "Water Management at Abandoned Flooded Underground Mines" which he had written in 2008. He also wrote "Mine Water Treatment" in 2022, which addresses the environmental effects of mining. In addition, he has also helped develop sustainable mine closure practices and water treatment technologies. He is the author of more than 230 publications, including papers, books and book chapters on hydrogeology, geoarchaeology and mining-related topics, which have appeared in various journals and conference proceedings. In his active role in the Board of Directors of the "Forum Bergbau and Wasser [Mining and Water Forum]" since 2017, he contributed to research about mine flooding and mine water stratification.

== Professional affiliations and volunteer work ==
Christian Wolkersdorfer is engaged in multiple professional organisations. He has served as the President of the International Mine Water Association (IMWA) since 2017 and General Secretary since 1999, and he has held leadership roles in organisations dedicated to mine water management and environmental protection as well as the German Federal Geothermal Advisory Board. He shows his commitment to community service through volunteer roles in historical mining organizations and advisory positions in environmental committees. He has also been part of the Academy of Science of South Africa (ASSAF) since 2022.

== Bibliography ==
- Wolkersdorfer, C (2008). Water Management at Abandoned Flooded Underground Mines. Heidelberg: Springer. doi:10.1007/978-3-540-77331-3. ISBN 978-3-540-77330-6.
- Hofmann, J; Wolkersdorfer, C (2013). Mining History of the Montafon (PDF). Schruns: Heimatschutzverein Montafon. ISBN 978-3-902225-51-1.
- Wolkersdorfer, C (2022). Mine Water Treatment- Active and Passive Methods. Heidelberg: Springer. doi:10.1007/978-3-662-65770-6. ISBN 978-3-662-65769-0.
