= Padre =

Padre means father in many Romance languages, and it may also refer to:

== Arts and entertainment ==
- "Padre" (song), by Gloria Lasso, 1956; covered by Toni Arden (1958) and Elvis Presley (1973)
- Padre (film), a 2016 Italian drama
- The Padre, a 2018 Canadian drama film

== People ==
- A military chaplain
- A Latin Catholic priest
- A member of the San Diego Padres baseball team

== Places ==
- Padre Island, a barrier island in Texas, U.S.
  - North Padre Island, northern part of the island
  - South Padre Island, southern part of the island
  - Padre Island National Seashore
- Padre, Kasaragod, Kerala, India
- Isla del Padre, Rocha Department, Uruguay

== Others ==
- PADRE, Partnership for Acid Drainage Remediation in Europe
- Padre (software), an integrated development environment for the Perl programming language

== See also ==
- Padres (disambiguation)
