= Sipri =

Sipri may refer to:

- As-Safira, a city in Syria, known in pre-Islamic times as Sipri
- Shivpuri, a city and a municipality in Madhya Pradesh, India, formerly known as Sipri
- Stockholm International Peace Research Institute (SIPRI)

== See also ==
- CPRI (disambiguation)
