= PADRE =

Partnership for Acid Drainage Remediation (PADRE)
- Established: 2003
- Type: Scientific-technical association
- Headquarters: Newcastle upon Tyne, UK
- Region served: Europe
- Services: Journal, Congresses
- Members: 150
- Key people: Adam Jarvis; Christian Wolkersdorfer; Lena Alakangas
- Website: www.PADRE.IMWA.info

The Partnership for Acid Drainage Remediation (PADRE) is a European-based scientific-technical association dedicated to acid mine water related topics.

== History ==
PADRE was founded in 2003 in Johannesburg, South Africa, due to the steadily increasing problems related to water in Europe. It is a sister organisation of the International Mine Water Association - IMWA and was publicly launched during IMWA’s Mine Water 2004 conference, in Newcastle upon Tyne (UK) in September 2004.
