= Tailings =

Materials left over from the separation of valuable minerals from ore

In mining, tailings or tails are the materials left over after the process of separating the valuable fraction from the uneconomic fraction (gangue) of an ore. Tailings are different from overburden, which is the waste rock or other material that overlies an ore or mineral body and is displaced during mining without being processed. Waste valorization is the evaluation of waste and residues from an economic process in order to determine their value in reuse or recycling, as what was gangue at the time of separation may increase with time or more sophisticated recovery processes.

The extraction of minerals from ore can be done two ways: placer mining, which uses water and gravity to concentrate the valuable minerals, or hard rock mining, which pulverizes the rock containing the ore and then relies on chemical reactions to concentrate the sought-after material. In the latter, the extraction of minerals from ore requires comminution, i.e., grinding the ore into fine particles to facilitate extraction of the target element(s). Because of this comminution, tailings consist of a slurry of fine particles, ranging from the size of a grain of sand to a few micrometres. Mine tailings are usually produced from the mill in slurry form, which is a mixture of fine mineral particles and water.

Tailings are likely to be dangerous sources of toxic chemicals such as heavy metals, sulfides, and in some cases radioactive content. These chemicals are especially dangerous when stored in water in ponds behind tailings dams. These ponds are also vulnerable to major breaches or leaks from the dams, causing environmental disasters, such as the Mount Polley disaster in British Columbia. Because of these and other environmental concerns such as groundwater leakage, toxic emissions and bird death, tailing piles and ponds have received more scrutiny, especially in developed countries, but the first UN-level standard for tailing management was only established in 2020.

There are a wide range of methods for mitigating the impacts of tailings.

== Terminology ==
Tailings are also called culm dumps, slimes, refuse, leach residue, slickens, or terra-cone (terrikon).

== Examples ==
=== Sulfide minerals ===
The effluent from the tailings from the mining of sulfidic minerals has been described as "the largest environmental liability of the mining industry". These tailings contain large amounts of pyrite (FeS_{2}) and Iron(II) sulfide (FeS), which are rejected from the sought-after ores of copper and nickel, as well as coal. Although harmless underground, these minerals are reactive toward air in the presence of microorganisms, which if not properly managed lead to acid mine drainage.

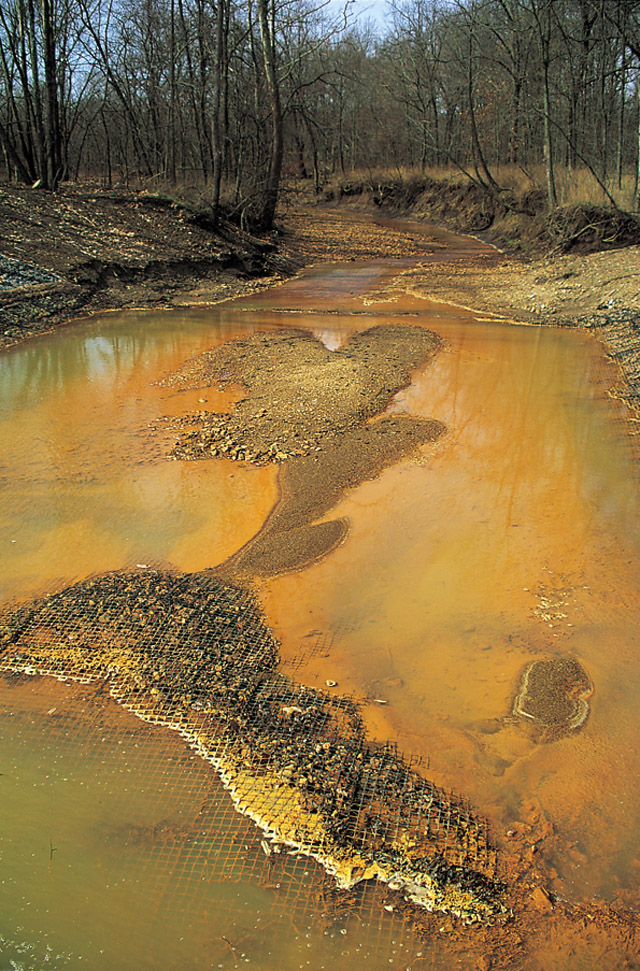
Yellow boy in a stream receiving acid mine drainage from surface coal mining

=== Phosphate rock mining ===
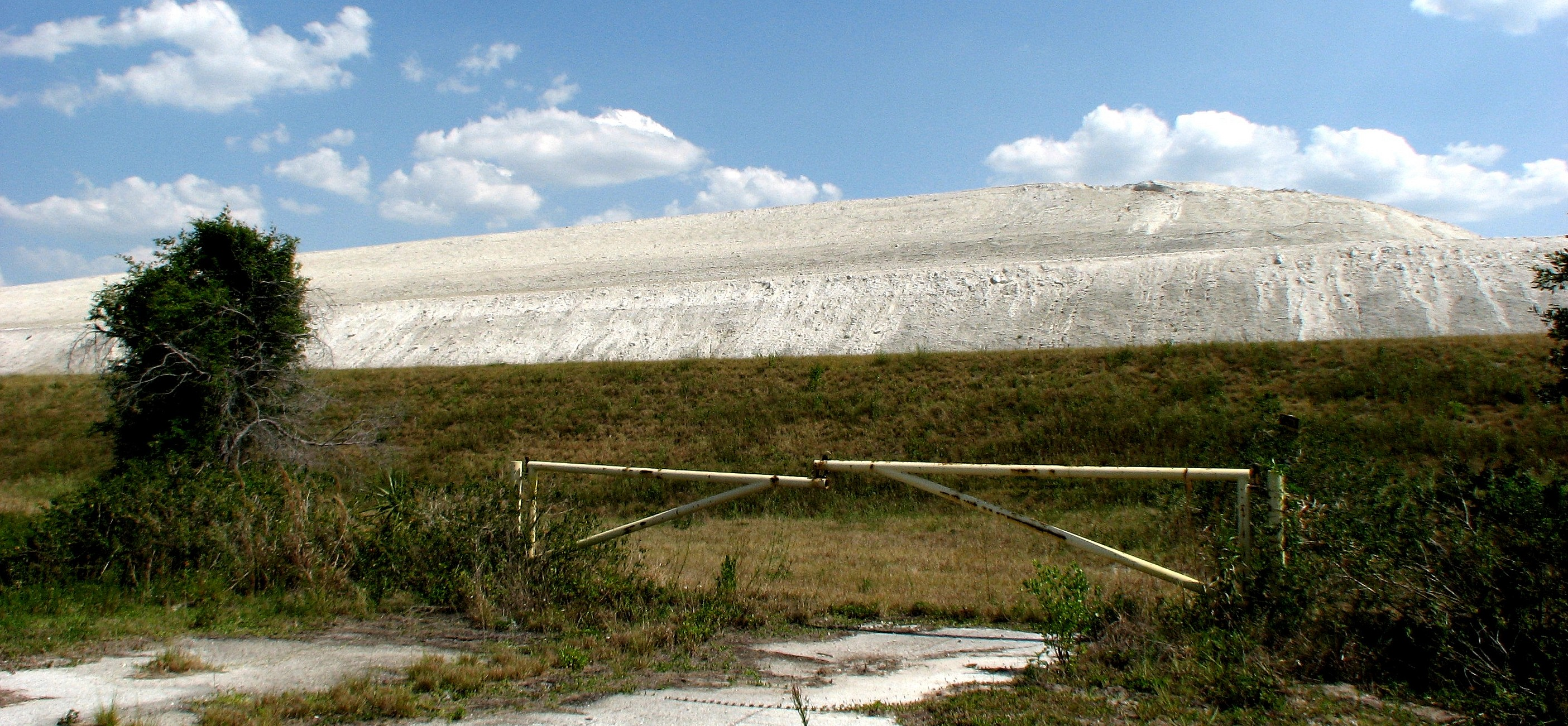
Phosphogypsum stack located near Fort Meade, Florida. These contain the waste byproducts of the phosphate fertilizer industry.

Between 100 million and 280 million tons of phosphogypsum waste are estimated to be produced annually as a consequence of the processing of phosphate rock for the production of phosphate fertilizers. In addition to being useless and abundant, phosphogypsum is radioactive due to the presence of naturally occurring uranium, thorium, and their daughter isotopes. Depending on the price achievable on the uranium market, extraction of the uranium content may be economically lucrative even absent other incentives, such as reducing the harm the radioactive heavy metals do to the environment.

=== Aluminium ===
Bauxite tailings is a waste product generated in the industrial production of aluminium. Making provision for the approximately 70 million tonnes (150 billion pounds) that is produced annually is one of the most significant problems in aluminium manufacturing.

==== Red mud ====
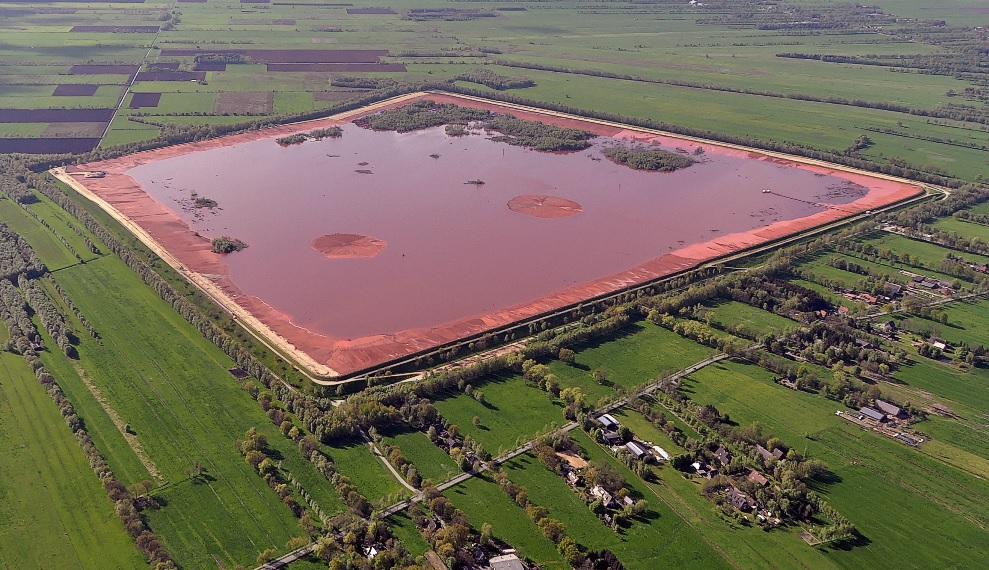
Red mud near Stade (Germany)

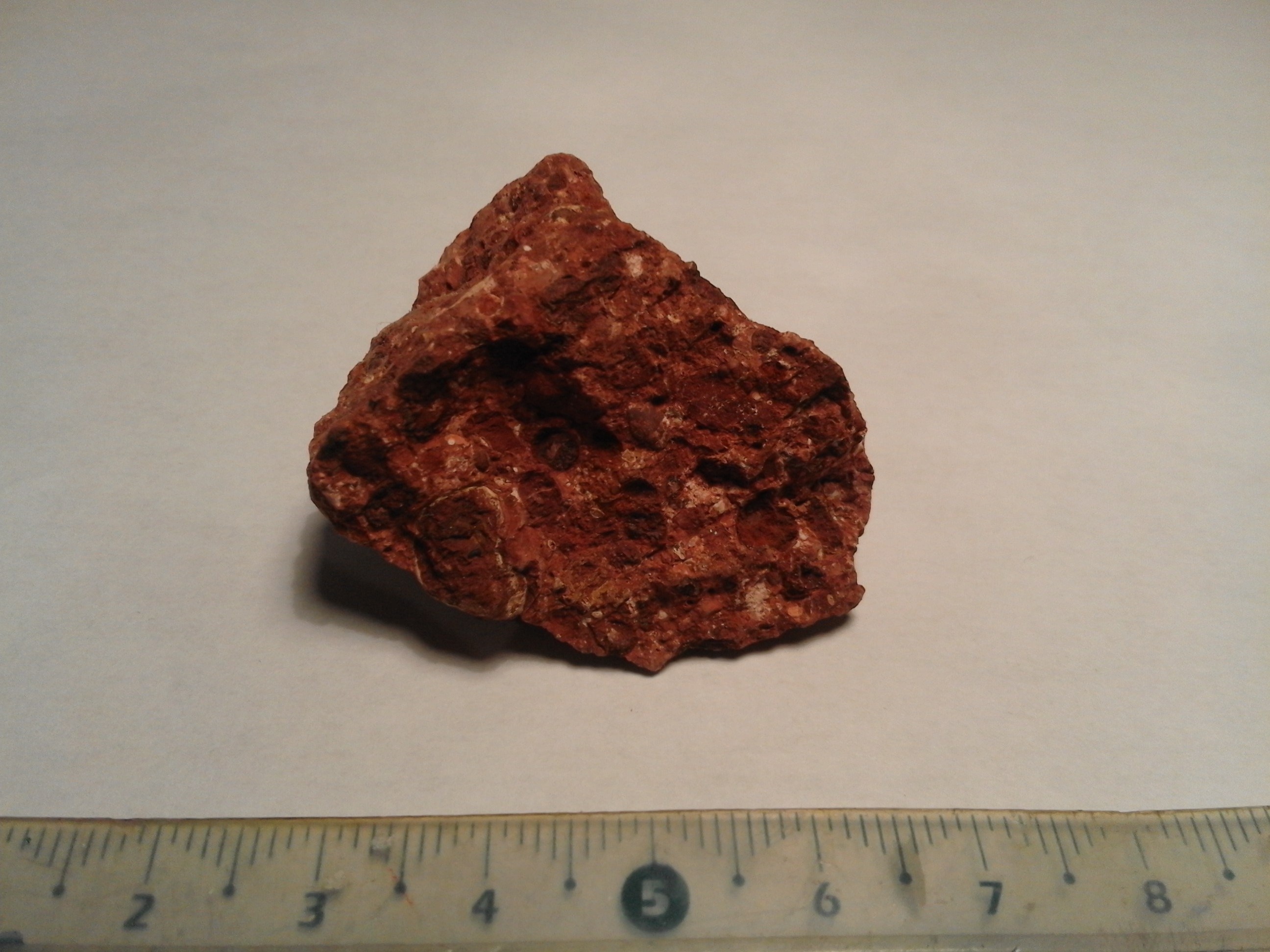
Bauxite, an aluminium ore (Hérault department, France). The reddish colour is due to iron oxides that make up the main part of the red mud.

Red mud, now more frequently termed bauxite residue, is an industrial waste generated during the processing of bauxite into alumina using the Bayer process. It is composed of various oxide compounds, including the iron oxides which give its red colour. Over 97% of the alumina produced globally is through the Bayer process; for every tonne (2,200 lb) of alumina produced, approximately 1 to 1.5 tonnes (2,200 to 3,300 lb) of red mud are also produced; the global average is 1.23. Annual production of alumina in 2023 was over 142 million tonnes (310 billion pounds) resulting in the generation of approximately 170 million tonnes (370 billion pounds) of red mud.

Due to this high level of production and the material's high alkalinity, if not stored properly, it can pose a significant environmental hazard. As a result, significant effort is being invested in finding better methods for safe storage and dealing with it such as waste valorization in order to create useful materials for cement and concrete.

Less commonly, this material is also known as bauxite tailings, red sludge, or alumina refinery residues. Increasingly, the name processed bauxite is being adopted, especially when used in cement applications.

=== Coal ===
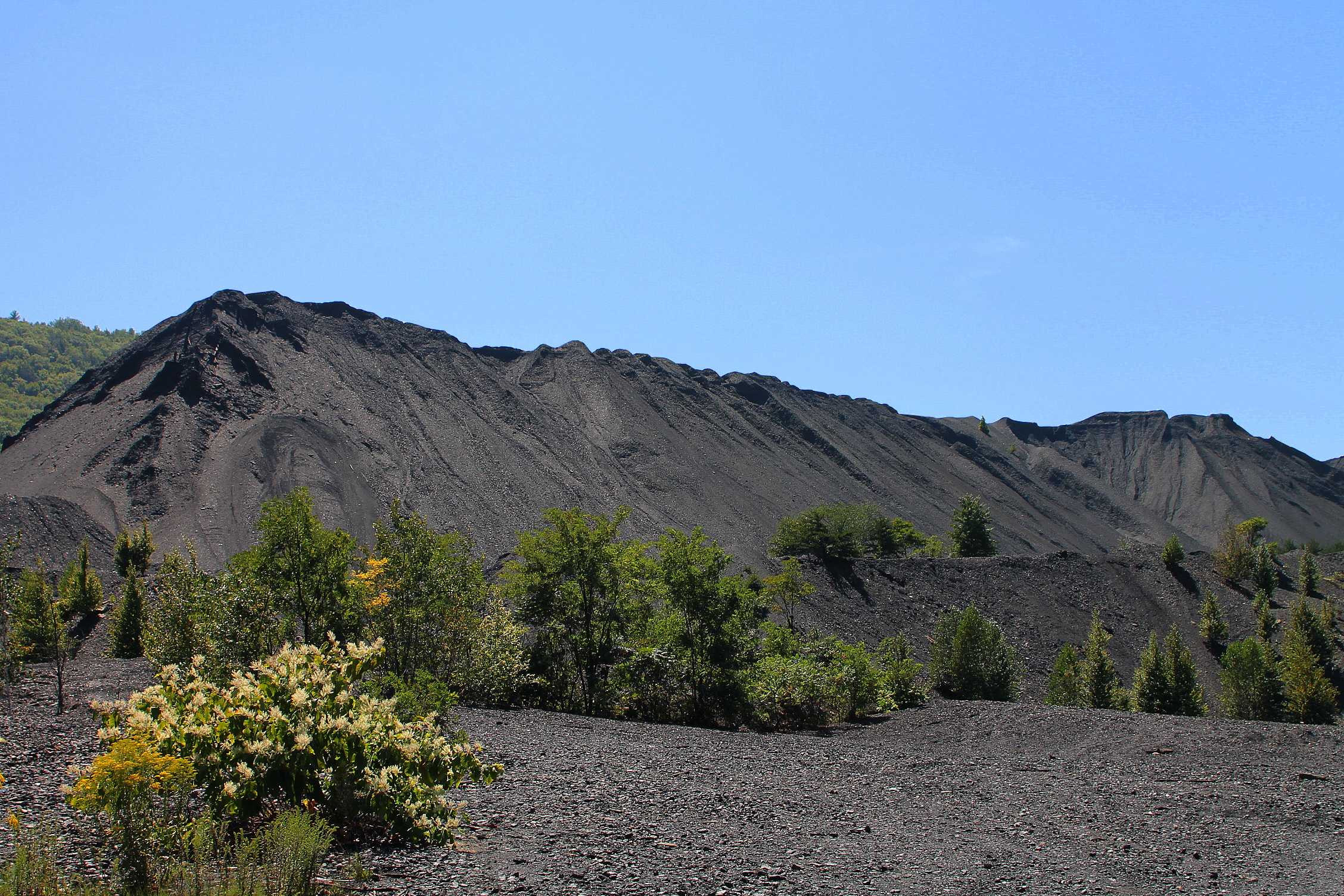
Coal waste in Pennsylvania

Coal refuse, also known as coal waste, rock, slag, coal tailings, waste material, rock bank, culm, boney, or gob, is the material left over from coal mining, usually as tailings piles or spoil tips. For every tonne of hard coal generated by mining, 400 kg (880 lb) of waste material remains, which includes some lost coal that is partially economically recoverable. Coal refuse is distinct from the byproducts of burning coal, such as fly ash.

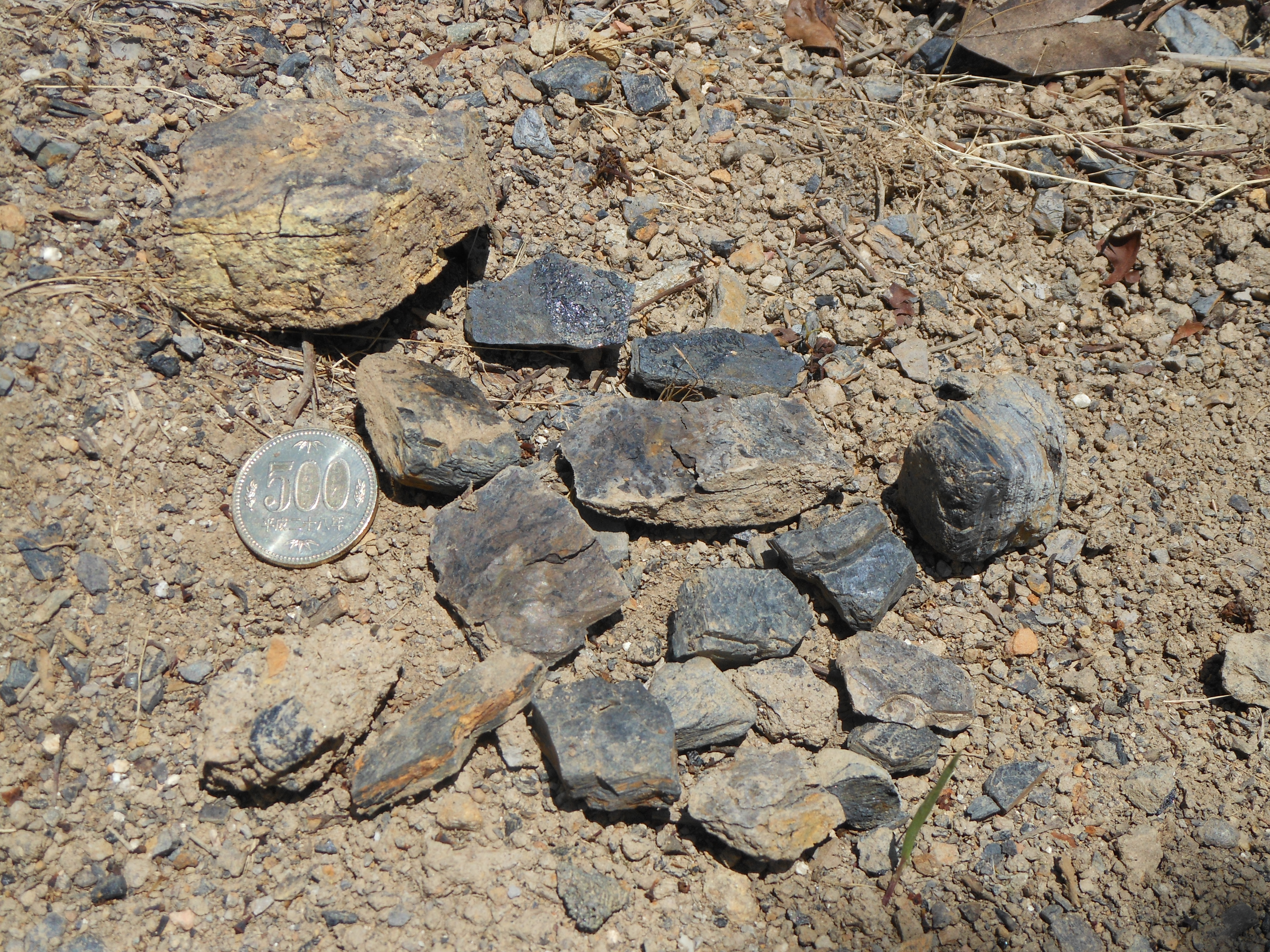
Coal spoil stones

Piles of coal refuse can have significant negative environmental consequences, including the leaching of iron, manganese, and aluminum residues into waterways and acid mine drainage. The runoff can create both surface and groundwater contamination. The piles also create a fire hazard, with the potential to spontaneously ignite. Because most coal refuse harbors toxic components, it is not easily reclaimed by replanting with plants like beach grasses.

Gob has about four times as much toxic mercury and more sulfur than typical coal. Culm is the term for waste anthracite coal.

== Economics ==
Early mining operations often did not take adequate steps to make tailings areas environmentally safe after closure. Modern mines, particularly those in jurisdictions with well-developed mining regulations and those operated by responsible mining companies, apply waste valorization to reprocessing waste materials, and often include the rehabilitation and proper closure of tailings areas in their costs and activities. For example, the Province of Quebec, Canada, requires not only the submission of a closure plan before the start of mining activity, but also the deposit of a financial guarantee equal to 100% of the estimated rehabilitation costs. Tailings dams are often the most significant environmental liability for a mining project.

== Environmental concerns ==
The fraction of tailings to ore can range from 90 to 98% for some copper ores to 20–50% of the other (less valuable) minerals. The rejected minerals and rocks liberated through mining and processing have the potential to damage the environment by releasing toxic metals (arsenic and mercury being two major culprits), by acid drainage (usually by microbial action on sulfide ores), or by damaging aquatic wildlife that rely on clear water (vs suspensions). One example is Cadmium, which is commonly found in zinc ores, can remain in mine tailings and waste water during refining process, causing toxicity to surrounding areas.

Tailings ponds can also be a source of acid drainage, leading to the need for permanent monitoring and treatment of water passing through the tailings dam; the cost of mine cleanup has typically been 10 times that of mining industry estimates when acid drainage was involved.

Tailings tend to be located in rural areas or near indigenous communities. The Global Industry Standard on Tailings Management (GISTM) recommends that "a human rights due diligence process is required to identify and address those that are most at risk from a tailings facility or its potential failure."

=== Disasters ===
The greatest danger of tailings ponds is dam failure, with the most publicized failure in the U.S. being the failure of a coal slurry dam in the West Virginia Buffalo Creek Flood of 1972, which killed 125 people; other collapses include the Ok Tedi environmental disaster in New Guinea, which destroyed the fishery of the Ok Tedi River. On average, worldwide, there is one big accident involving a tailings dam each year.

Other disasters caused by tailings dam failures are, the 2000 Baia Mare cyanide spill and the Ajka alumina plant accident. In 2015, the iron ore tailings dam failure at the Germano mine complex in Minas Gerais, Brazil, was the country's biggest environmental disaster. The dam breach caused the death of 19 people due to flooding of tailings slime downstream and affected some 400 km of the Doce river system with toxic effluence and out into the Atlantic Ocean.

== Storage methods ==
Historically, tailings were disposed of in the most convenient manner, such as in downstream running water or down drains. Because of concerns about these sediments in the water and other issues, tailings ponds came into use. The sustainability challenge in the management of tailings and waste rock is to dispose of material, such that it is inert or, if not, stable and contained, to minimise water and energy inputs and the surface footprint of wastes and to move toward finding alternate uses.

=== Tailings dams and ponds ===
Bounded by impoundments (an impoundment is a dam), these dams typically use "local materials" including the tailings themselves, and may be considered embankment dams. Traditionally, the only option for tailings storage was to contain the tailings slurry with locally available earthen materials. This slurry is a dilute stream of the tailings solids within water that was sent to the tailings storage area. The modern tailings designer has a range of tailings products to choose from depending upon how much water is removed from the slurry prior to discharge. It is increasingly common for tailings storage facilities to require special barriers like bituminous geomembranes (BGMs) to contain liquid tailings slurries and prevent impact to the surrounding environment. The removal of water not only can create a better storage system in some cases (e.g. dry stacking, see below) but can also assist in water recovery which is a major issue as many mines are in arid regions. In a 1994 description of tailings impoundments, however, the U.S. EPA stated that dewatering methods may be prohibitively expensive except in special circumstances. Subaqueous storage of tailings has also been used.

Tailing ponds are areas of refused mining tailings where the waterborne refuse material is pumped into a pond to allow the sedimentation (meaning separation) of solids from the water. The pond is generally impounded with a dam, and known as tailings impoundments or tailings dams. It was estimated in 2000 that there were about 3,500 active tailings impoundments in the world. The ponded water is of some benefit as it minimizes fine tailings from being transported by wind into populated areas where the toxic chemicals could be potentially hazardous to human health; however, it is also harmful to the environment. Tailing ponds are often somewhat dangerous because they attract wildlife such as waterfowl or caribou as they appear to be a natural pond, but they can be highly toxic and harmful to the health of these animals. Tailings ponds are used to store the waste made from separating minerals from rocks, or the slurry produced from tar sands mining. Tailings are sometimes mixed with other materials such as bentonite to form a thicker slurry that slows the release of impacted water to the environment.

There are many different subsets of this method, including valley impoundments, ring dikes, in-pit impoundments, and specially dug pits. The most common is the valley pond, which takes advantage of the natural topographical depression in the ground. Large earthen dams may be constructed and then filled with the tailings. Exhausted open pit mines may be refilled with tailings. In all instances, due consideration must be made to contamination of the underlying water table, among other issues. Dewatering is an important part of pond storage, as the tailings are added to the storage facility the water is removed – usually by draining into decant tower structures. The water removed can thus be reused in the processing cycle. Once a storage facility is filled and completed, the surface can be covered with topsoil and revegetation commenced. However, unless a non-permeable capping method is used, water that infiltrates into the storage facility will have to be continually pumped out into the future.

=== Paste tailings ===
Paste tailings is a modification to the conventional methods of disposal of tailings (pond storage). Conventional tailings slurries are composed of a low percent of solids and relatively high water content- normally ranging from 20% to 60% solids for most hard rock mining. When deposited into the tailings pond, the solids and liquids separate. In paste tailings the percent of solids in the tailings slurry is increased through the use of paste thickeners, in order to produce a product where the minimal separation of water and solids occurs. The material is then deposited into a storage area as a paste (with a consistency somewhat like toothpaste). Paste tailings has the advantage of being more efficient than conventional tailings, as it allows for recycling larger quantities of water. There is also a lower potential for seepage. However the cost of the thickening is generally higher than for conventional tailings and the pumping costs for the paste are also higher than for conventional tailings, as positive displacement pumps are normally required to transport the tailings from the processing plant to the storage area. Paste tailings are used in several locations around the world, including Sunrise Dam in Western Australia and Bulyanhulu Gold Mine in Tanzania.

=== Dry stacking ===
Tailings do not have to be stored in ponds as slurries. There is a growing use of the practice of dewatering tailings so the tailings can then be stacked. This saves water which potentially reduces the impacts on the environment in terms of a reduction in the potential seepage rates, space used, leaves the tailings in a dense and stable arrangement and eliminates the long-term liability that ponds leave after mining is finished. Dewatering can reduce tailings volume and recycle water.

Research at the Porgera Gold Mine is focusing on developing a method of combining tailings products with coarse waste rock and waste muds to create a product that can be stored on the surface in generic-looking waste dumps or stockpiles. Co-disposal has been successfully implemented by several designers including AMEC at, for example, the Elkview Mine in British Columbia.

=== Riverine tailings ===
As of 2005, only three mines operated by international companies continued to use riverine tailings disposal (RTD): The Ok Tedi mine, the Grasberg mine and the Porgera mine, all on New Guinea. This method is used in these cases due to seismic activity and landslide dangers which make other disposal methods impractical and dangerous. In most environments, not a particularly environmentally sound practice, it has seen significant utilisation in the past, leading to such spectacular environmental damage as done by the Mount Lyell Mining & Railway Company in Tasmania to the King River, or the poisoning from the Panguna mine on Bougainville Island, which led to large-scale civil unrest on the island, and the eventual permanent closing of the mine.

=== Submarine tailings ===
Commonly referred to as STD (Submarine Tailings Disposal) or DSTD (Deep Sea Tailings Disposal). Tailings can be conveyed using a pipeline then discharged so as to eventually descend into the depths. Practically, it is not an ideal method, as the close proximity to off-shelf depths is rare. When STD is used, the depth of discharge is often comparatively shallow, and extensive damage to the seafloor can result due to covering by the tailings product. If the density and temperature of the tailings product is not controlled, it may travel long distances, or even float to the surface.

This method is used by the gold mine on Lihir Island; its waste disposal has been viewed by environmentalists as highly damaging, while the owners claim that it is not harmful.

Disposal of tailings in the sea is prohibited by law in Australia, Brazil, Canada, China, Denmark, England, France, Greece, Russia and the United States. It is legal in Indonesia, Norway and Papua New Guinea. In 2026 in Norway, activists have been convicted for protests during the Repparfjorden conflict; fourteen more activists were on trial in June, and others are scheduled for trial in August.

In Chile the only such disposal has been Planta de Pellets which disposed its tailings legally in the sea from its establishment in 1978 until 2010. In 2014 Planta de Pellets and Sydvaranger in Norway had the only iron ore tailings disposals into the sea in world, Planta de Pellets had in 2019 however pledged to end this practise by late 2023.

== Reprocessing ==
As mining techniques and the price of minerals improve, it is not unusual for tailings to be reprocessed using new methods, or more thoroughly with old methods, to recover additional minerals. Extensive tailings dumps of Kalgoorlie / Boulder in Western Australia were re-processed profitably in the 1990s by KalTails Mining. Even though the reprocessing of tailings might deliver additional metal value and decreases in some cases the risk for acid mine drainage, the volume of mineral waste is not decreased significantly.

To remediate this, a valorization of the bulk of the tailings, the gangue minerals, has to be found. A crucial valorization pathway is the use in construction materials, which is the commodity with the highest demand for minerals. Novel technologies are being developed, such as granulation processes for the application as aggregate in concrete.

A machine called the PET4K Processing Plant has been used in a variety of countries for the past 20 years to remediate contaminated tailings.

=== Phytostabilisation ===
Phytostabilisation is a form of phytoremediation that uses hyperaccumulator plants for long-term stabilisation and containment of tailings, by sequestering pollutants in soil near the roots. The plant's presence can reduce wind erosion, or the plant's roots can prevent water erosion, immobilise metals by adsorption or accumulation, and provide a zone around the roots where the metals can precipitate and stabilise. Pollutants become less bioavailable and livestock, wildlife, and human exposure is reduced. This approach can be especially useful in dry environments, which are subject to wind and water dispersion.

=== Pond reclamation by microbiology ===
During extraction of the oil from oil sand, tailings consisting of water, silt, clays, and other solvents are also created. This solid will become mature fine tailings by gravity. Foght et al (1985) estimated that there are 10^{3} anaerobic heterotrophs and 10^{4} sulfate-reducing prokaryotes per milliliter in the tailings pond, based on conventional most probable number methods. Foght set up an experiment with two tailings ponds and an analysis of the archaea, bacteria, and the gas released from tailings ponds showed that those were methanogens. As the depth increased, the moles of CH_{4} released actually decreased.

Siddique (2006, 2007) states that methanogens in the tailings pond live and reproduce by anaerobic degradation, which will lower the molecular weight from naphtha to aliphatic, aromatic hydrocarbons, carbon dioxide and methane. Those archaea and bacteria can degrade the naphtha, which was considered as waste during the procedure of refining oil. Both of those degraded products are useful. Aliphatic, aromatic hydrocarbons and methane can be used as fuel in the humans' daily lives. In other words, these methanogens improve the coefficient of utilization. Moreover, these methanogens change the structure of the tailings pond and help the pore water efflux to be reused for processing oil sands. Because the archaea and bacteria metabolize and release bubbles within the tailings, the pore water can go through the soil easily. Since they accelerate the densification of mature fine tailings, the tailings ponds are enabled to settle the solids more quickly so that the tailings can be reclaimed earlier. Moreover, the water released from the tailings can be used in the procedure of refining oil. Reducing the demand of water can also protect the environment from drought.

== Regulation ==
The UN and business communities developed an international standard for tailings management in 2020 after the critical failure of the Brumadinho dam disaster. The program was convened by United Nations Environment Programme (UNEP), International Council on Mining and Metals (ICMM) and the Principles for Responsible Investment. Public preferences on mining can vary depending on the environmental impact of tailings.

== See also ==
- Coal slurry impoundment
- Environmental impact of iron ore mining
- Landfarming
- Mine closure planning
- Mine reclamation
- Oil sands tailings ponds
- Spoil tip
