= CPRI =

CPRI may refer to:

- Center for Pharmaceutical Research and Innovation, an academic research center
- Central Power Research Institute, a power research facility in India
- Child and Parent Resource Institute, a medical facility
- Common Public Radio Interface, a communications standard
