= Padres (disambiguation) =

The San Diego Padres are a Major League Baseball team based in San Diego, California.

Padres may also refer to

- Padres workers at the Spanish missions in California
- San Diego Padres (PCL), a former minor league franchise in the Pacific Coast League
- Tucson Padres, a minor league baseball team in Tucson, Arizona
- PADRES, a Chicano priests' organization
- Padres FC, a football club in Australia

== See also ==
- Padre (disambiguation)
