= Environmental impact of iron ore mining =

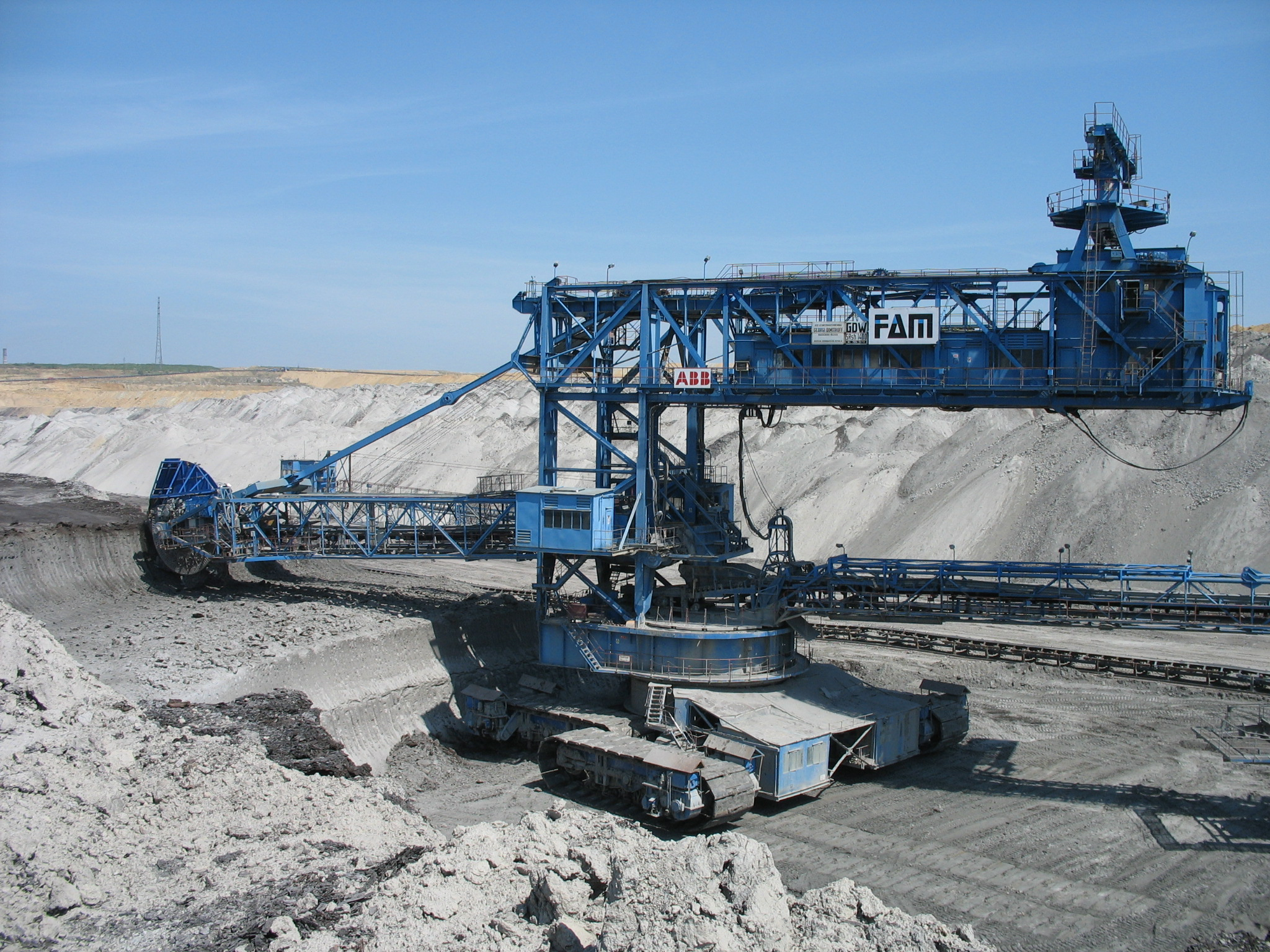
Excavating Külszini lignitbány Visontán

The environmental impact of iron ore mining in all its phases from excavation to beneficiation to transportation and beyond may have detrimental effects on air quality, water quality, biological species, and nearby communities. This is predominantly a result of large-scale iron ore tailings (solid wastes produced during the beneficiation process of iron ore concentrate) that are released into the environment which are harmful to both animals and humans.

== Iron ore ==
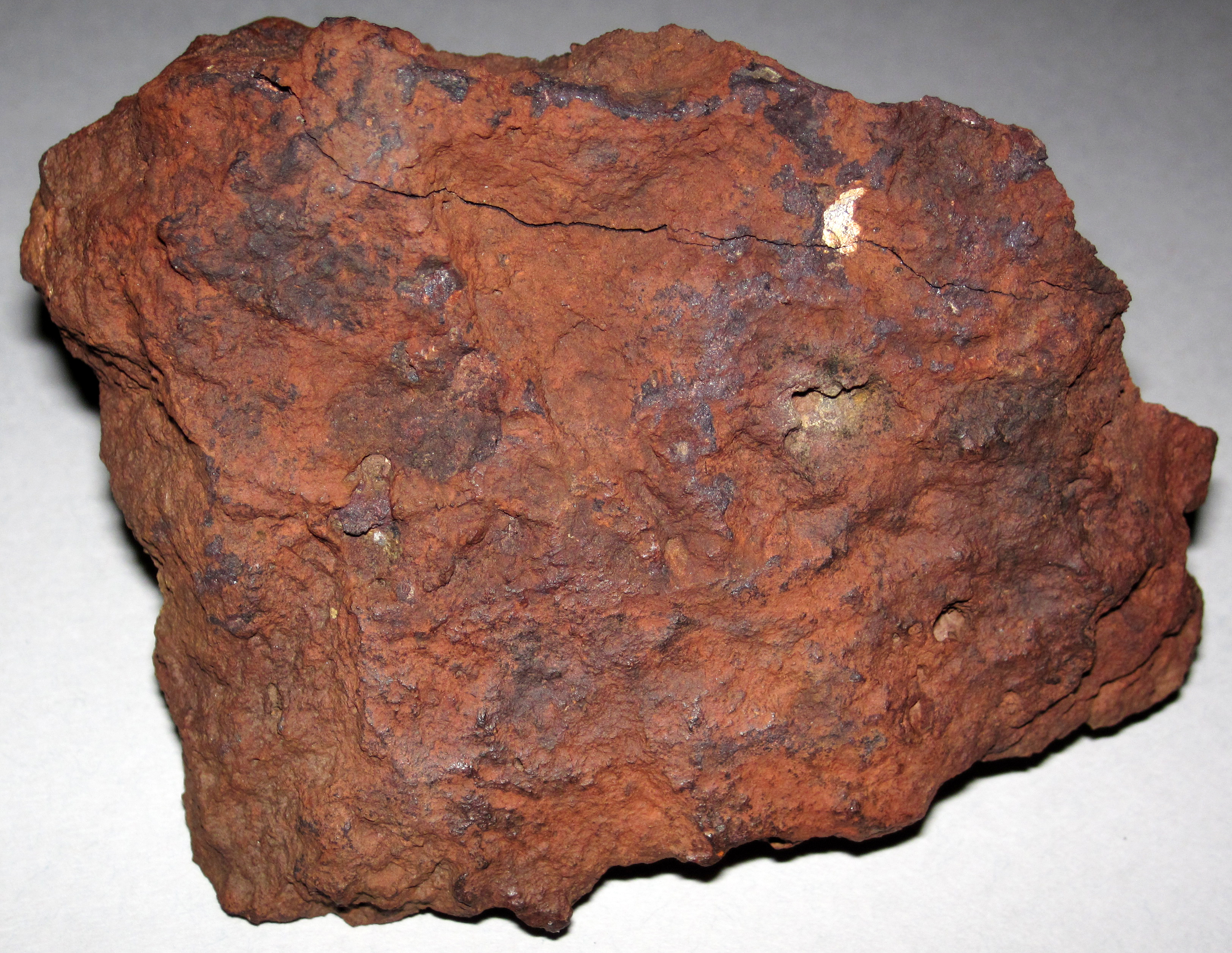
Hematite-rich iron ore

Iron ore is a mixture of rocks and minerals containing enough iron content and sufficient volume and accessibility for mining and transportation to be economically mined. Around five percent of the Earth's crust is composed of iron making it the fourth most abundant element. Globally, iron ore is most commonly found in banded iron formations (BIFs) in the form of magnetite (Fe_{3}O_{4}), hematite (Fe_{2}O_{3}), goethite (FeO(OH)), limonite (FeO(OH)·n(H_{2}O)) or siderite (FeCO_{3}). Hematite and magnetite are the most common types of Iron ore. Roughly 98% of iron ore on the global market is used in iron and steel production. The other 2% of iron ore is used to make powdered iron for certain types of steel, auto parts, and catalysts; radioactive iron for medicine; and iron blue in paints, inks, cosmetics, and plastics. Countries rich in iron ore deposits include Australia, Brazil, Canada, India, China, and South Africa.

=== Mining and processing ===
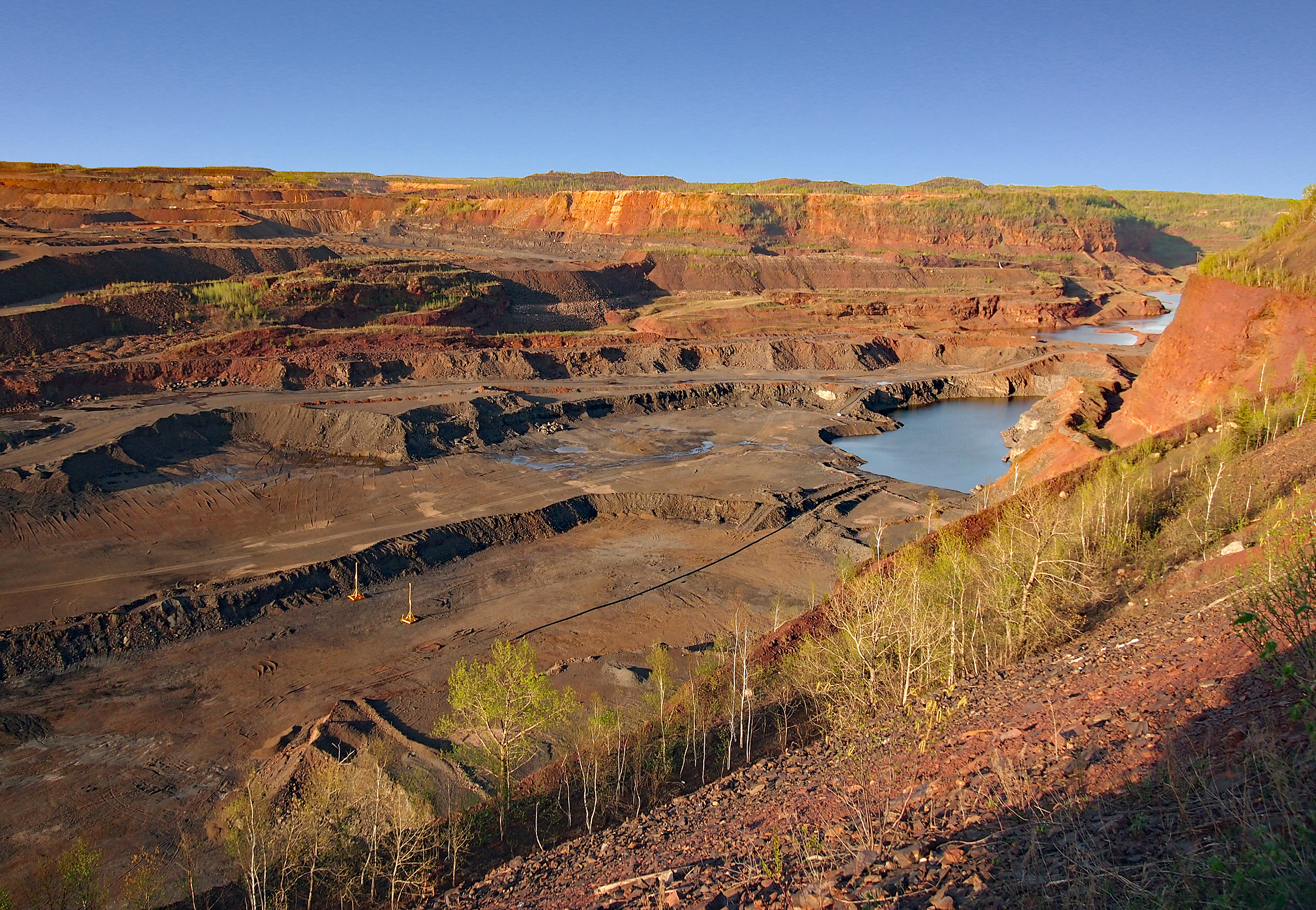
Hull-Rust-Mahoning Open Pit Iron Mine in Hibbing, Minnesota, United States.

Once a fertile site is located, iron ore is typically extracted through open-pit mining. Common extraction methods for iron ore are drilling and blasting. The ore is then transported for processing where it undergoes crushing before being put in a blast furnace where coke smelting converts the iron ore to metallic iron. This is a part of the beneficiation process where the ore is becoming ore concentrate. The gangue minerals become tailings and are transferred to a storage facility.

== Issues ==
=== Iron mine tailings ===
The high demand for iron necessitates continuous mining and processing, which generates a large amount of solid and liquid waste. Iron ore tailings are leftover materials that are released once mineral processing is complete. This waste includes large amounts of iron and manganese oxides in addition to high pH values. Potentially toxic elements found in iron ore tailings include Ba, Cr, Cd, Co, Cu, Fe, Mn, Pb, Ni, and Zn. It is estimated that nearly 32% of iron ore extracted ends up as tailings. Every year, approximately 1.4 billion tons of iron ore tailings are produced. Iron ore mining sites, as well as the wastewater tailings produced by them, contain high levels of dissolved iron and particulate suspended matter, which alter the water chemistry and metal bioavailability.

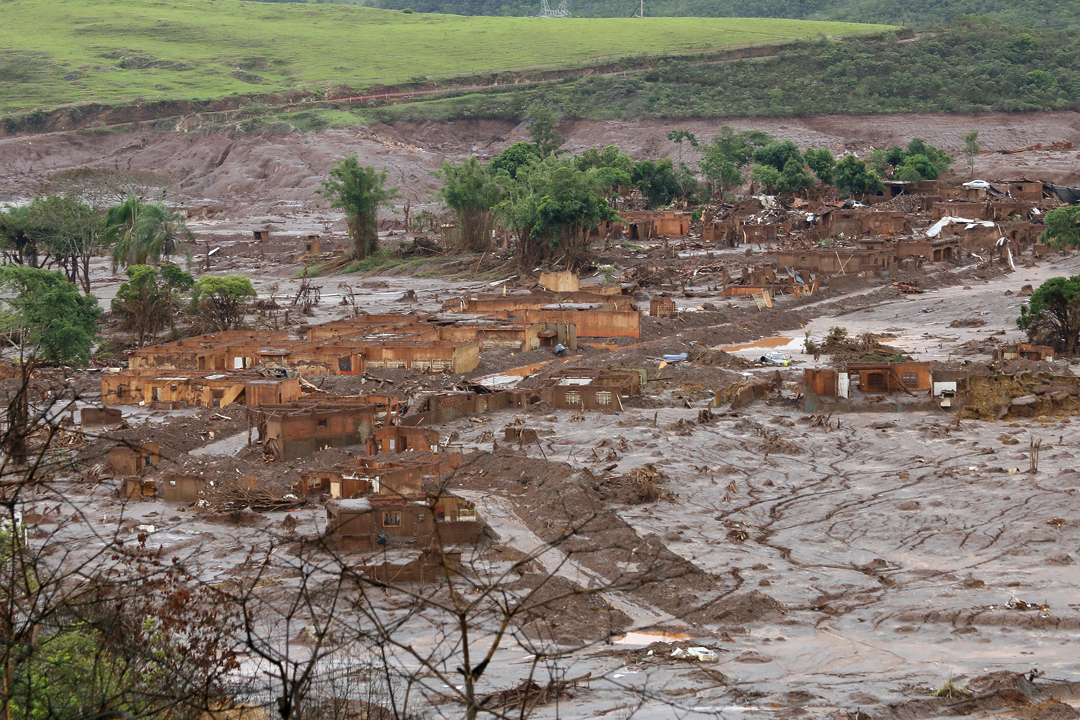
Damage in the town of Bento Rodrigues from the failure of the Fundão Dam.

After leaving the mine, tailings need to be stored and managed in order to avoid environmental hazards and safety risks. In Brazil, approximately 95% of mining tailings end up in containment dams. Many countries have experienced dam breaks. In 2015, the city of Mariana in Brazil experienced the failure of the Fundão Dam. More than 30 million cubic meters of water and tailings from iron ore mining were released into the environment. Iron ore tailings dam breaks cause serious environmental damage and fatality in humans. Tailings impoundments also have the potential to seep. Seepage can be prevented or at least minimized by creating an impermeable layer. Otherwise, acidic and metal-bearing waters from tailings can affect aquatic habitats and nearby groundwater.

=== Air quality ===
The main sources of emissions during both the construction and operation phases include the products of combustion such as nitrous oxide, carbon dioxide, carbon monoxide, and sulfur dioxide and fugitive dust from the operation of equipment. The main sources of combustion-related emissions during both the construction and operation phases are related to diesel generators, fuel-oil boilers, and on-site road traffic. Fugitive dust emissions can occur during land clearing, ground excavation, and equipment traffic on site. Potential sources of fugitive dust during operation include ore loading and unloading, ore crushing, stockpile erosion, and dust from conveyor systems around the site. Fugitive dust emissions are proportional to the disturbed land area and the level of activity and vary substantially from day to day with varying meteorological conditions. The major effects of industrial air pollution on wildlife include direct mortality, weakening industrial-related injury and disease, and physiological and psychological stress.

Gas and particulate emissions from historical smelting operations have been a source of concern for human health and environmental impacts at some sites. Modern smelters use processes that drastically reduce particulate and sulfur dioxide emissions, recognizing the importance of minimizing and mitigating this impact. Historically, sulfur dioxide was the most common source of concern because it reacts with atmospheric water vapor to form sulfuric acid, also known as acid rain. The acidic conditions that develop in the soils where these emissions precipitate can harm existing vegetation and inhibit the growth of new vegetation. The environmental impact of historical smelting has left barren areas near smelting operations. Some areas that have been impacted for decades are now beginning to recover. Emissions from older metal smelters may have harmed human health in some cases. During the operation of lead-zinc smelters, for example, elevated levels of lead in blood have been measured in residents of some communities located near the smelters. Smelting operations are now combined with environmental controls to prevent potential environmental and health issues related to emissions.

=== Acid rock drainage ===
Acid rock drainage is created when water and oxygen interact with sulphur-bearing minerals and chemicals in rocks. Sulphuric acid is the most common chemical reaction that results from mining activities as the beneficiation process requires dissolving the minerals surrounding the ore, which releases metals and chemicals previously bound up in the rock into nearby streams, freshwater bodies, and the atmosphere. Acid is most commonly carried off the mind site by rainwater or surface drainage. Many metals become mobile as water becomes more acidic and at high concentrations these metals become toxic to most life forms. Approaches to preventing and cleaning up acid mine drainage include reclaiming contaminated land, soil removal, direct treatment, filling in abandoned mines, relocating and isolating waste, bacteria control, diverting water, and disposing mine waste underwater.

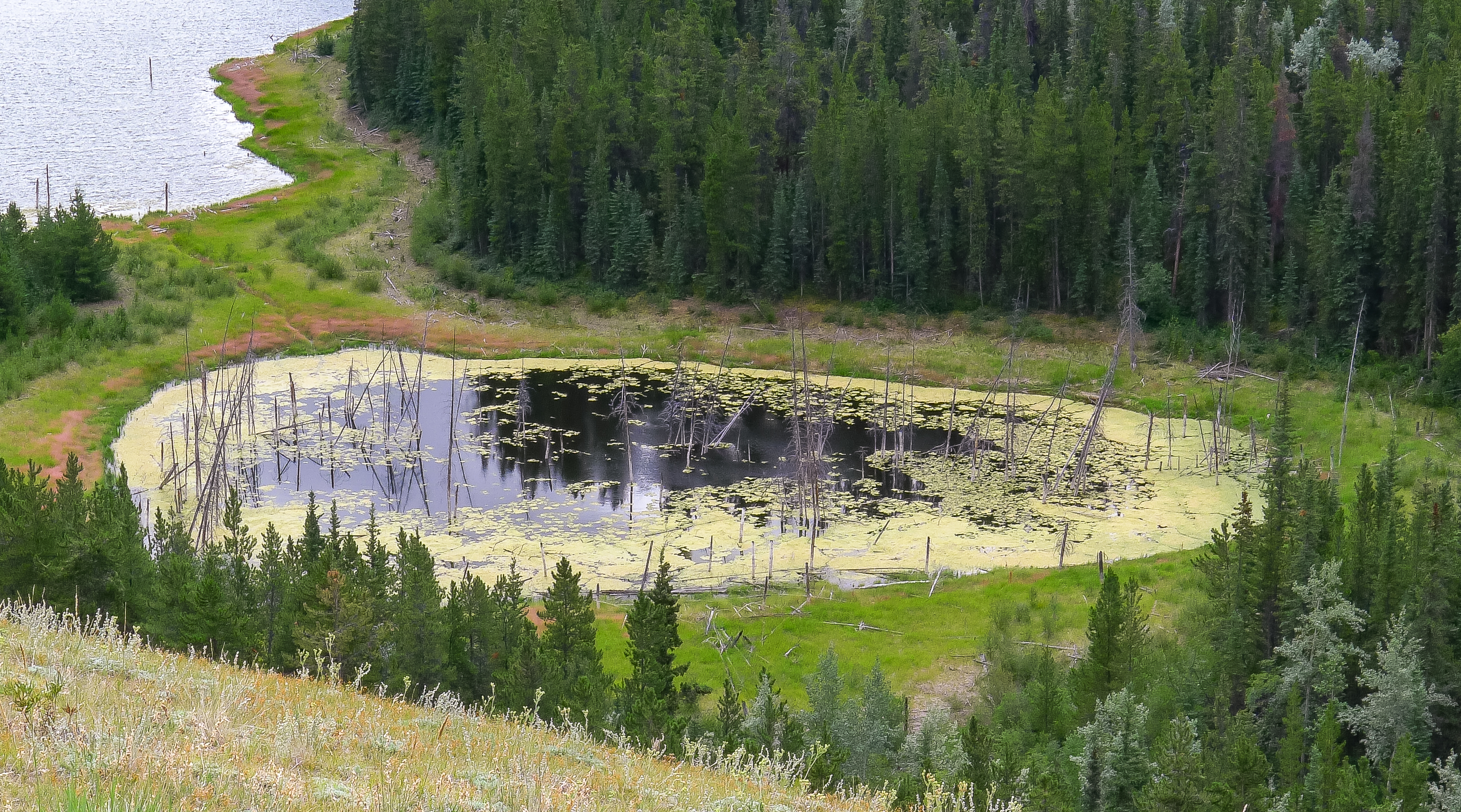
Marshy (7041418469)

=== Wetlands and flora ===
Some mines require the draining of nearby wetlands for the beneficiation process and the cooling of project machinery, which affects downstream water quality and water quantity, and flora and fauna. Wetlands include bogs, fens, marsh, swamps, and shallow water. Wetlands serve a number of functional purposes in the biosphere such as collecting and storing surface runoff, moderating stream flows, reducing natural flooding and erosion, cleaning and purifying water, recharging groundwater zones, and providing habitats for plants and animals,. Wetlands are being altered from their natural state to support alternative land uses such as agriculture, urbanization, industrial development, and recreation.

=== Megafauna ===
Some animals are more susceptible to change and degradation than others Megafauna, including large mammals such as black bears, caribou, and wolves, have shown notable behavioural changes and is sensitive to noise levels caused by iron ore mining and infrastructure projects shortly before and immediately after the young are born and during the rutting season. These disturbance types increase the distances moved by the animals and may effectively decrease reproductive success and cause starvation. In addition, mining development means new roads and trails are needed for access which greatly impacts wildlife. Animals lose their habitats and are made susceptible to overexploitation, interrupted migration patterns, and lower population sizes. It also affects the abundance of food available for these animals since open-pit mining requires the removal of topsoil and vegetation which diminishes biodiversity.

=== Water quality ===
Water is one of the major natural resources that is being polluted by iron ore mining operations. In order to achieve sustainability, Earth's streams, rivers, lakes, and oceans must remain uncontaminated.

The extraction of iron ore can cause surface runoff and leachate leading to the pollution of nearby water bodies. Iron ore mining pollutes water through metal contamination and heightened sediment levels in streams. The risk of contamination increases when iron ore mining exposes metal-bearing ores rather than exposing ore bodies naturally through erosion and when mined ores are placed on earth surfaces in mineral dressing processes. In the case of Iron Mountain, remediation activities took place in 1990 and water samples taken from seeps came back with negative pH values and were considered the most acidic water ever sampled. Mining can also have an effect on water before the extraction process. During exploration, roads may be poorly built resulting in sedimentation which disrupts water quality. Overall, water quality can be impacted as a result of acid mine drainage, heavy metal contamination and leaching, processing chemicals pollution, and erosion and sedimentation.

=== Indigenous communities ===
The above environmental issues of iron ore mining have disproportionate impacts on Indigenous communities and they remain vulnerable to mining's impacts as a result of their close relationship to the land, water, and other natural resources. According to a study from Spain's Autonomous University of Barcelona, mining has been the cause of 24.7% of environmental conflicts involving Indigenous peoples despite making up only 6.4% of the global population.

Since the excavation and mineral separation process of mining requires the removal of overburden, waste rock, and tailings, the local surface environment, atmosphere, and waterways are greatly affected. In addition, these environmental consequences may persist well after the extractive activities have come to an end. At the landscape scale, deforestation and new infrastructure generate patchy landscapes that can disrupt local wildlife and vegetation patterns. Substantial waste products also contaminate nearby water bodies damaging local fisheries and polluting drinking water. In terms of the local atmosphere, the process of smelting releases toxic smoke and gasses and the production of slag and ash affecting the health of plants, animals, and humans. While the mining industry has been proven to have some positive social and economic impacts, it can also exacerbate already-existing mental health and social issues. Overall, Indigenous land-based livelihoods and traditional ways of life are disproportionately affected making it difficult for them to maintain their identity.

=== Environmental assessment ===
Infrastructure projects must be filed for submission, revision, and assessment under federal or regional legislation to ensure projects are carried out in a sustainable manner if it is thought to have a significant impact on the natural, social, or economic environment. Depending on the size, scope, and scale of particular projects, they can be assessed on a national or regional level. In most countries, larger plans are assessed under federal legislation such as the Canadian Environmental Assessment Act (2012) and smaller projects are reviewed more locally, such as the NL Environmental Protection Act (2010). The purpose of an environmental assessment is to protect the environment and quality of life of the people of the province by facilitating the wise management of the natural resources of the province. The environmental assessment process ensures that projects proceed in an environmentally acceptable manner. The size and scope of iron ore projects make them subject to environmental assessment at all levels of administrative legislation. Since Indigenous populations are especially vulnerable to mining projects, it is expected that they are included in this process and have the ability to participate. Indigenous-led impact assessments (ILIA) allow Indigenous governing bodies to design and conduct this process and evaluate the impacts according to their values, concerns, and priorities. While an ILIA incorporated similar stages to a state-led environmental impact assessment, it differs because it reflects the unique locations, histories, natural resource issues, governance systems, and place-based knowledge of the Indigenous peoples undertaking the assessment.

=== Public safety ===
Old or abandoned mining sites can be dangerous. They may have exposed or hidden entrances to underground workings, as well as old intriguing buildings. Ground sinking, also known as "subsidence," is another safety concern at some mine sites. Where underground workings have come close to the surface, the ground may gradually sink. An unexpected collapse can happen at any moment without notice therefore these areas are usually identified and are best to be avoided. When modern mines close, mine owners mitigate such hazards by sealing off mine workings, regrading and lowering the steep slopes of surface excavations, and salvaging or demolishing buildings and facilities.

Where old mining areas are common, current mine owners, government agencies, or other interested parties may undertake reclamation and safety mitigation projects to address hazards at these sites. These programs serve the purpose of identifying hazards, placing warning and no-trespassing signs, and fencing off dangerous areas. As part of these efforts, entrances to old underground workings may be closed altogether. Some abandoned mine workings have become important bat habitats. Mine openings can be closed to allow bats continued access and protection. This practice is particularly beneficial to endangered bat species. Because many old mine sites may be dangerous, the public is advised to exercise caution and avoid entering them.

=== Physical disturbances ===
The actual mine workings, including open pits and waste rock disposal areas, cause significant physical disturbances at a mine site. Once a mine closes, mining facilities that occupy a small area of the disturbed land can either be salvaged or town down. The main visual and aesthetic impacts of mining are the open pits and waste rock disposal areas. Open-pit mining disturbs larger areas than underground mining making the visual impacts much greater. In addition, the amount of waste rock produced in open pit mines is typically two to three times the amount of ore produced meaning massive amounts of waste rock are removed from the pits and deposited in nearby areas.

While tailings impoundments, leach piles, and slag piles do vary in size, they are generally quite large. Some of the largest mill impoundments, such as those at open pit copper mines, can cover thousands of acres (tens of square kilometres) and be several hundred feet (about 100 meters) thick. Heap leach piles can range in size from a few hundred feet (about 100 m) to hundreds of acres (0.1 to 1 km2).
