= Uranium acid mine drainage =

Uranium acid mine drainage refers to acidic water released from a uranium mining site using processes like underground mining and in-situ leaching. Underground, the ores are not as reactive due to isolation from atmospheric oxygen and water. When uranium ores are mined, the ores are crushed into a powdery substance, thus increasing surface area to easily extract uranium. The ores, along with nearby rocks, may also contain sulfides. Once exposed to the atmosphere, the powdered tailings react with atmospheric oxygen and water. After uranium extraction, sulfide minerals in uranium tailings facilitates the release of uranium radionuclides into the environment, which can undergo further radioactive decay while lowering the pH of a solution.

Uranium-238 Decay Chain

== Uranium chemistry ==
Uranium may exist naturally as U^{+6} in ores but also forms the water-soluble uranyl ion UO_{2}^{+2} when uranium tailings are oxidized by atmospheric oxygen in the following reaction.

U^{+6} + O_{2} → UO_{2}^{+2}

The solubility of uranium increases under similar oxidizing conditions when it forms uranyl carbonate complexes in the following reaction.

U^{+6} + O_{2} + 2CO_{3}^{2−}→ [UO_{2}(CO_{3})_{2}]^{2+}

Extraction of uranium from the ore may occur under acid or alkaline leaching processes using sulfuric acid and sodium carbonate respectively. If leached with sulfuric acid, uranyl forms a soluble uranyl sulfate complex in the following reaction. Hydrogen ions in solution react with water to produce hydronium ions which lowers a solution's pH making it more acidic.

UO_{2} + 3H_{2}SO_{4} + 1/2 O_{2} → [UO_{2}(SO_{4})_{3}]^{4−} + H_{2}O + 4H^{+}

H^{+}_{(aq)} + H_{2}O_{(l)} → H_{3}O^{+}_{(aq)}

During in-situ leaching uranyl reacts with iron, a common natural oxidant, to produce uranyl trioxide which is further oxidized then leached using alkaline sodium carbonate in the following reactions.

UO_{2} + 2Fe^{3+} → UO_{2}^{+2} + 2Fe^{2+}

UO_{2} + 1/2 O_{2} → UO_{3}

UO_{3} + 3Na_{2}CO_{3} + H_{2}O → [UO_{2}(CO_{3})_{3}]^{4+} + 4Na^{+} + 2NaOH

When considering the formation secondary uranium minerals, as discussed in the case study section below, the pH of the solution that contains uranophane is one of determining factors of how much of the uranophane is in mineral form or in the form of its ions. Shown in figure 2, from a study performed by Tatiana Shvareva et al. in 2011, is the dissolution of uranophane in pH of 3 (Figure 3b) and pH of 4 (Figure 3a). The graphs demonstrate that in a more acidic environment, the concentrations of Ca, U, and Si are more likely to be more abundant in more basic environments where it is more likely that they will form minerals. This is more likely to happen when the acidic mine drainage is released into rivers or large water deposits and they become diluted to a pH closer to that of water.

The enthalpies of formation (from elements and from oxide species) and Gibbs free energies of formation (from elements) of the uranium minerals boltwoodite, Na-boltwoodite, and uranophane are shown in Table 1. Solubility constants (dissociation of minerals to ions) of the same minerals, determined using a bomb calorimeter in a study by Shvareva, Tatiana et al. in 2011, are shown in Table 2. The Gibbs free energies of formation show that the process, when the reactions from the individual elements to the oxides are taken into account, is spontaneous. The enthalpies of formation, when only considering the reaction from the oxides to the mineral, suggest a relatively high probability for their Gibbs free energy of formation values to also be spontaneous.

	Δ_{f, ox}H (kJ/mol)	Δ_{f, el}H (kJ/mol)	Δ_{f, el}G (kJ/mol)
Boltwoodite: K(UO_{2})(HSiO_{4}):HO	-251.2 ± 5.9	-2766.8 ± 6.5	-2758.6 ± 3.5
Na-boltwoodite: Na(UO_{2})(HSiO_{4}):H_{2}O	-215.8 ± 6.0	-2948.8 ± 6.6	-2725.2 ± 2.6
Uranophane: 1/2[Ca(UO_{2})_{2}(HSiO_{4}):5H_{2}O]	-161.1 ± 5.4	-3399.5 ± 5.8	-3099.3 ± 5.6

Table 1. The enthalpy of formation (from oxide to mineral), enthalpy of formation (from individual elements to mineral), and Gibbs free energy (from individual elements to mineral) of boltwoodite, Na-boltwoodite, and uranophane.

	log Ksp ± 2σ	Mass action equations
Boltwoodite: K(UO_{2})(HSiO_{4}):H_{2}O	4.12 (-0.48/+0.30)	K_{sp} = $\frac{[\alpha_{K^+}] [\alpha_{{UO_2}^{2+}}] [\alpha_{{H_2}S{O_4}}]}{[\alpha_{H^+}]}$
Na-boltwoodite: Na(UO_{2})(HSiO_{4}):H_{2}O	6.07 (-0.16/+0.26)	K_{sp} = $\frac{[\alpha_{Na^+}] [\alpha_{{U{O_2}}^{2+}}] [\alpha_{{H_2}{S{0_4}}}]}{[\alpha_{H^+}]}$
Uranophane: 1/2[Ca(UO_{2})_{2}(HSiO_{4}):5H_{2}O]	10.82 (-0.62/+0.29)	K_{sp} = $\frac{[\alpha_{Ca^{2+}}] [\alpha_{{UO_2}^{2+}}] [\alpha_{{H_2}S{O_4}}]}{[\alpha_{H^+}]}$

Table 2. Solubility constants and mass action equations for boltwoodite, Na-boltwoodite, and uranophane.

== Uranium acid mine drainage case study ==
Two uranium mines in northern Portugal, Quinta do Bispo and Cunha Baixa, have been inactive since 1991. Acidic water is pumped out of the mines for neutralization and precipitation of radionuclides using calcium hydroxide. Studies in 2002 found that there were high concentrations of soluble and suspended uranium radionuclides in river water samples near the mines. Castelo river reached suspended uranium isotope concentrations of -72 kBq/kg which is roughly 170x higher than normal concentrations in the Mondego River but returned to normal after 7 km. The mine waters of Quinta do Bispo and Cunha Baixa had low pH values at 2.67 and 3.48 with U-238 concentrations of 92,000 mBq/L and 2,200 mBq/L, respectively.

Results from studies done in 2002 showed a significant negative correlation between both dissolved uranium radionuclides and hydrogen ions with pH in mine waters. Sorption of dissolved uranium radionuclides in rivers combine with nearby rock sediments can form minerals like uranophane. The chemistry and findings in this case is essentially representative of other uranium mines in the world.

== Uranium radionuclides in the environment ==
A uranium radionuclide is a radioactive isotope. Radioactivity is natural in the environment, however uranium radionuclides can lead to radioactive decay. In the case of uranium mines, these radionuclides can leach into the water and cause the radioactivity to be carried elsewhere, as well as form precipitates that can be harmful to the environment. The uranium radionuclides can eventually be carried to fruits and vegetables via contaminated waters. Sulfuric acid, oxidation, and alkaline leaching are processes of how radionuclides make their way into the environment. When uranium decays it also produces the isotopes ^{226}Ra and ^{222}Rn, which may be environmentally harmful due to the fact that radon is present as an inert gas and therefore, might enter into the soil or atmosphere. Radon then can emit alpha particles and gamma radiation. The three different radioactive isotopes of uranium are uranium-238, uranium-235, and uranium-234. Each has a different half-life which determines the isotope's decay rate. When uranium-235 combines with other molecules it creates a chemical reaction that can cause detrimental effects to water. Even though isotope formation occurs naturally, when combined with other elements it can cause the pH of water to become more acidic as discussed previously.
