= International Mine Water Association =

Scientific organization

International Mine Water Association – IMWA
- Established: 1979
- Founder: Prof. Dr. Rafael Fernandez-Rubio, Spain
- Type: Professional association
- Headquarters: Wendelstein, Germany
- Region served: Worldwide
- Services: Journal, Congresses
- Members: 781
- Key people: Prof. Dr. Christian Wolkersdorfer (President); Dr. Michael Paul (Vice President); Prof Qiang Wu (Vice President); Dr. Lotta Sartz (General Secretary); Dr. Bob Kleinmann (Editor-in-chief); Dr. Alison Turner (Treasurer)
- Website: www.IMWA.info

The International Mine Water Association (IMWA) is the first scientific-technical association worldwide dedicated to mine water related topics. Its peer-reviewed journal is Mine Water and the Environment.

== History ==
IMWA was founded in 1979 in Granada, Spain, due to the steadily increasing problems related to water in the mining sector. Back then, the main focus of the association was on safety issues of water in mining. Over the years the focal point changed to more environmental issues. Since its conception, IMWA aimed to promote contacts between researchers, mine operators, consultants, and students. For this purpose, IMWA organizes congresses every three years and, in the years in between, symposia are held. In 2014, about 250 delegates from 40 nations attended the 12th IMWA Congress in Xuzhou (徐州), China.

== Publications ==
Since 1982, the IMWA has published the Journal of the International Mine Water Association which was later (1994) renamed Mine Water and the Environment. Today, the Journal is available electronically (ISSN 1616-1068) and in printed form (ISSN 1025-9112) from Springer-Nature, (Heidelberg, Germany). Since 2010, it is listed in the Science Citation Index Expanded and is dispatched quarterly (March, June, September and December) to more than 1,000 subscribers worldwide. Its electronic articles are requested several thousands of times per month.

Furthermore, the book series Mining and the Environment was launched in 2008 (Springer) with the first volume being devoted to mine water management and tracer tests and the second volume focusing on acidic pit lakes.

== Congresses and symposia ==
Since its formation, IMWA has held 14 congresses and a number of symposia, all of which were organized by the respective local IMWA host:

- Budapest, Hungary 1982 (1st Congress)
- Granada, Spain 1985 (2nd Congress)
- Nottingham, UK 1986
- Katowice, Poland 1987
- Melbourne, Australia 1988 (3rd Congress)
- Lisbon, Portugal 1990
- Ljubljana•Pörtschach, Slovenia•Austria 1991 (4th Congress)
- Chililabombwe, Zambia 1993
- Nottingham, UK 1994 (5th Congress)
- Denver, USA 1995
- Portorož, Slovenia 1996
- Bled, Slovenia 1997 (6th Congress)
- Johannesburg, South Africa 1998
- Seville, Spain 1999
- Kattowice, Poland 2000 (7th Congress)
- Belo Horizonte, Brazil 2001
- Freiberg, Germany 2002
- Johannesburg, South Africa 2003 (8th Congress)
- Newcastle, UK 2004
- Oviedo, Spain 2005 (9th Congress)
- St. Louis, USA 2006
- Cagliari, Italy 2007
- Carlsbad, Czech Republic 2008 (10th Congress)
- Pretoria, South Africa 2009
- Cape Breton, Canada 2010
- Aachen, Germany 2011 (11th Congress)
- Bunbury, Western Australia 2012
- Golden, Colorado, USA 2013
- Xuzhou, China 2014 (12th Congress)
- Santiago, Chile 2015
- Leipzig, Germany 2016
- Rauha/Lappeenranta, Finland 2017 (13th Congress)
- Johannesburg, South Africa 2018
- Perm, Russia 2019
- 2020 (postponed due to coronavirus)
- Cardiff, Wales 2021 (online due to coronavirus) (14th Congress)
- Christchurch, New Zealand 2022
- Newport, Wales, UK 2023
- Morgantown, West Virginia, US 2024
- Braga, Portugal, 2025

== Members ==
In 2013 the International Mine Water Association records 851 individual including 66 corporate members from 40 Nations with two local groups in Europe (PADRE) and North America, respectively. Since 1997 membership of the association grew steadily from 70 members to today's numbers; mainly based on the increasing importance of water and its environmental aspects in mining. Most members of IMWA are registered in North America, followed by Europe, South Africa and Australia.
