= Center for Pharmaceutical Research and Innovation =

The Center for Pharmaceutical Research and Innovation (CPRI) is a University of Kentucky-based research center established by the University of Kentucky College of Pharmacy in 2012 to facilitate academic translational research and drug discovery/drug development. The UK CPRI specializes in natural product-based drug discovery from microbes found within unique environments including underground and surface coal mines, acid mine drainage and mine reclamation sites, thermal vents associated with underground coal mine fires (see coal seam fire) and deep-well drilling for carbon sequestration. CPRI also provides core support for medicinal chemistry, assay development and screening, rational drug design, computational chemistry, and ADMET. The Center collaborates with investigators focused on drug discovery or development research in the areas of cancer, drug and alcohol addiction, cardiovascular disease, infectious disease, regenerative medicine and neurodegenerative disease.
