= Acid mine drainage =

Outflow of acidic water from metal or coal mines

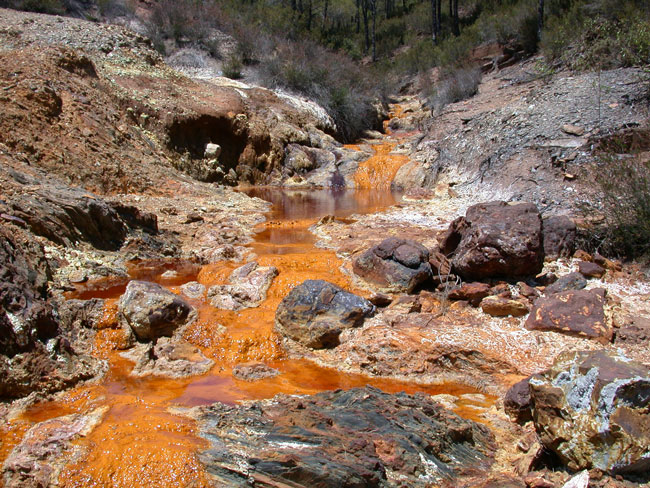
Rio Tinto in Spain presents an acid drainage of both natural and artificial origin (mining)

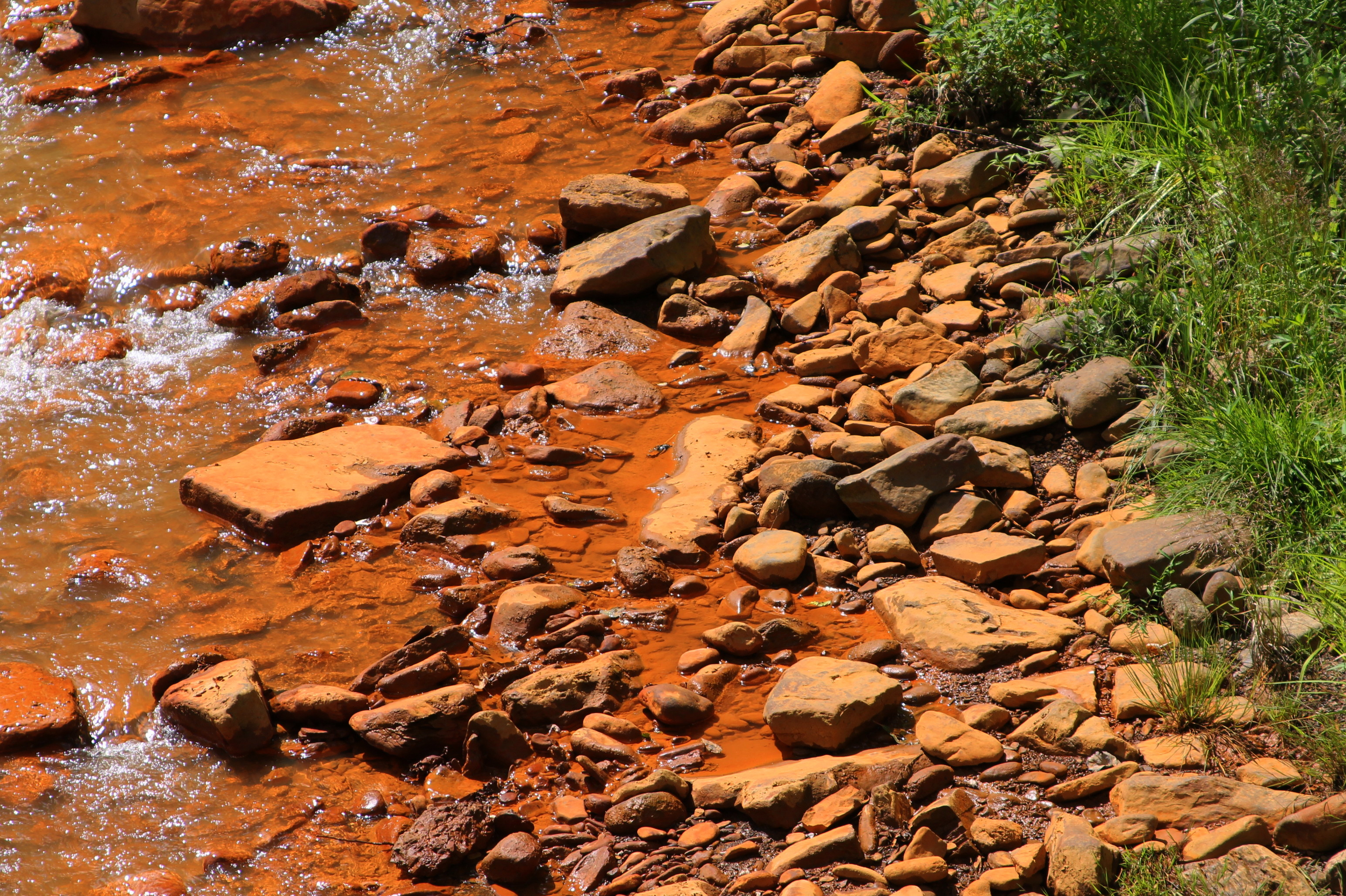
Rocks stained by ferrous precipitate from acid mine drainage on Shamokin Creek in Northumberland County, Pennsylvania

Acid mine drainage, acid and metalliferous drainage (AMD), or acid rock drainage (ARD) is the outflow of acidic water from metal mines and coal mines.

Acid rock drainage occurs naturally within some environments as part of the rock weathering process but is exacerbated by large-scale earth disturbances characteristic of mining and other large construction activities, usually within rocks containing an abundance of sulfide minerals. Areas where the earth has been disturbed (e.g. construction sites or highway construction) may create acid rock drainage. In many localities, the liquid that drains from coal stocks, coal handling facilities, coal washeries, and coal waste tips can be highly acidic, and in such cases it is treated as acid rock drainage. These, combined with reduced pH, have a detrimental impact on the streams' aquatic environments.

The same type of chemical reactions and processes may occur through the disturbance of acid sulfate soils formed under coastal or estuarine conditions after the last major sea level rise, and constitutes a similar environmental hazard.

== Nomenclature ==
Historically, the acidic discharges from active or abandoned mines were called acid mine drainage, or AMD. The term acid rock drainage, or ARD, was introduced in the 1980s and 1990s to indicate that acidic drainage can originate from sources other than mines. For example, a paper presented in 1991 at a major international conference on this subject was titled: "The Prediction of Acid Rock Drainage – Lessons from the Database". Both AMD and ARD refer to low pH or acidic waters caused by the oxidation of sulfide minerals, though ARD is the more generic name.

In cases where drainage from a mine is not acidic and has dissolved metals or metalloids, or was originally acidic, but has been neutralized along its flow path, then it is described as "neutral mine drainage", "mining-influenced water" or otherwise. None of these other names have gained general acceptance.

== Occurrence ==
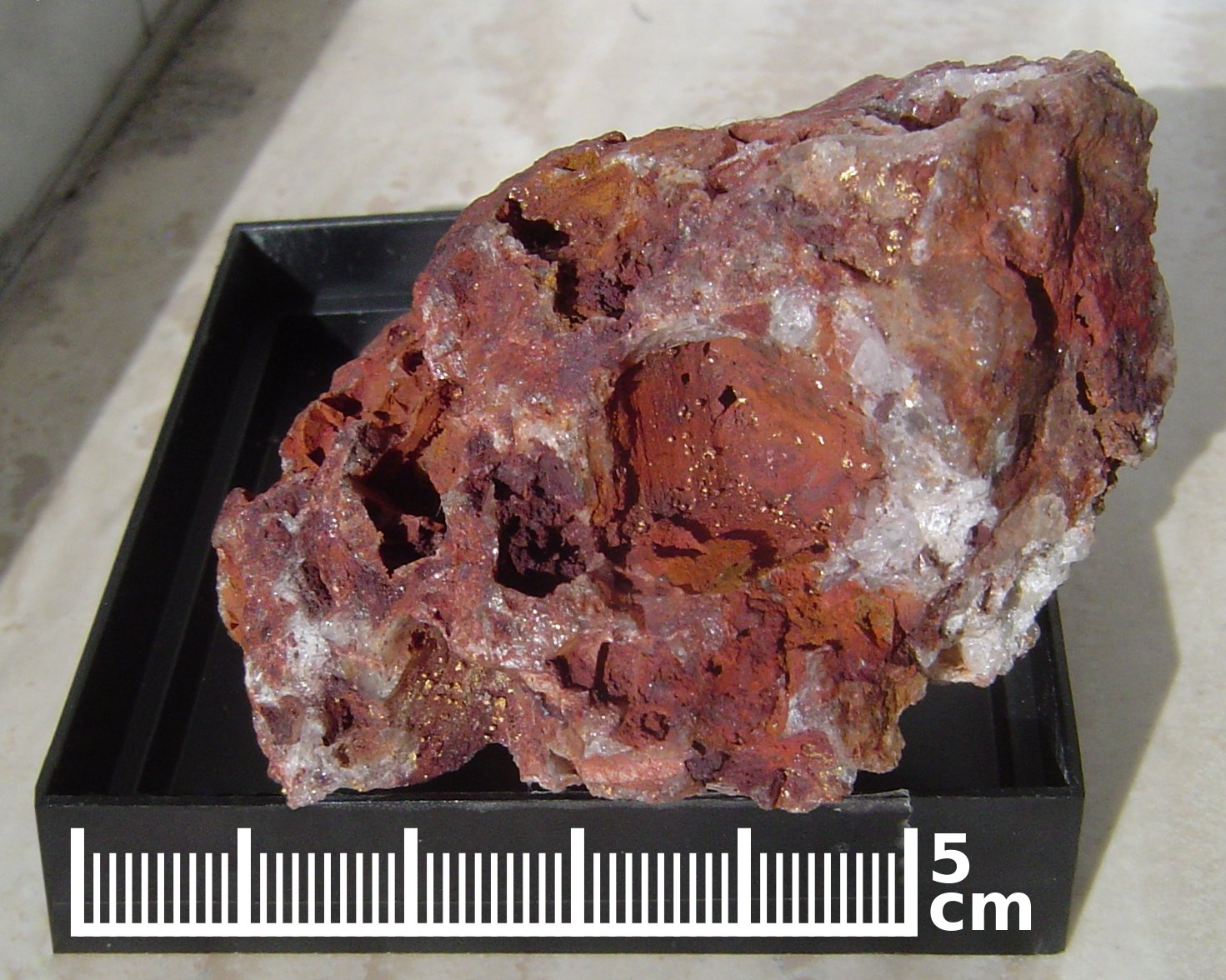
In this case, the pyrite has dissolved away yielding a cube shape and residual gold. This break down is the main driver of acid mine drainage.

Sub-surface mining often progresses below the water table, so water must be constantly pumped out of the mine in order to prevent flooding. When a mine is abandoned, the pumping ceases, and water floods the mine. This introduction of water is the initial step in most acid rock drainage situations. Tailings piles or ponds, mine waste rock dumps, and coal spoils are also an important source of acid mine drainage.

After being exposed to air and water, oxidation of metal sulfides (often pyrite, which is iron-sulfide) within the surrounding rock and overburden generates acidity. Colonies of bacteria and archaea greatly accelerate the decomposition of metal ions, although the reactions also occur in an abiotic environment. These microbes, called extremophiles for their ability to survive in harsh conditions, occur naturally in the rock, but limited water and oxygen supplies usually keep their numbers low. Extremophiles known as acidophiles especially favor the low pH levels of abandoned mines. In particular, Acidithiobacillus ferrooxidans is a key contributor to pyrite oxidation.

Metal mines may generate highly acidic discharges where the ore is a sulfide mineral or is associated with pyrite. In these cases the predominant metal ion may not be iron but rather zinc, copper, or nickel. The most commonly mined ore of copper, chalcopyrite, is itself a copper-iron-sulfide and occurs with a range of other sulfides. Thus, copper mines are often major culprits of acid mine drainage.

At some mines, acidic drainage is detected within 2–5 years after mining begins, whereas at other mines, it is not detected for several decades. In addition, acidic drainage may be generated for decades or centuries after it is first detected. For this reason, acid mine drainage is considered a serious long-term environmental problem associated with mining.

== Chemistry ==
The chemistry of oxidation of pyrites, the production of ferrous ions and subsequently ferric ions, is very complex, and this complexity has considerably inhibited the design of effective treatment options.

Although a host of chemical processes contribute to acid mine drainage, pyrite oxidation is by far the greatest contributor. A general equation for this process is:

2 FeS_{2}_{(s)} + 7 O_{2}_{(g)} + 2 H_{2}O_{(l)} → 2 Fe^{2+}_{(aq)} + 4 SO^{2−}_{4}_{(aq)} + 4 H^{+}_{(aq)}

The oxidation of the sulfide to sulfate solubilizes the ferrous iron (iron(II)), which is subsequently oxidized to ferric iron (iron(III)):

4 Fe^{2+}_{(aq)} + O_{2}_{(g)} + 4 H^{+}_{(aq)} → 4 Fe^{3+}_{(aq)} + 2 H_{2}O_{(l)}

Either of these reactions can occur spontaneously or can be catalyzed by microorganisms that derive energy from the oxidation reaction. The ferric cations produced can also oxidize additional pyrite and reduce into ferrous ions:

FeS_{2}_{(s)} + 14 Fe^{3+}_{(aq)} + 8 H_{2}O_{(l)} → 15 Fe^{2+}_{(aq)} + 2 SO^{2−}_{4}_{(aq)} + 16 H^{+}_{(aq)}

The net effect of these reactions is to release H^{+}, which lowers the pH and maintains the solubility of the ferric ion.

== Effects ==
=== Effects on pH ===
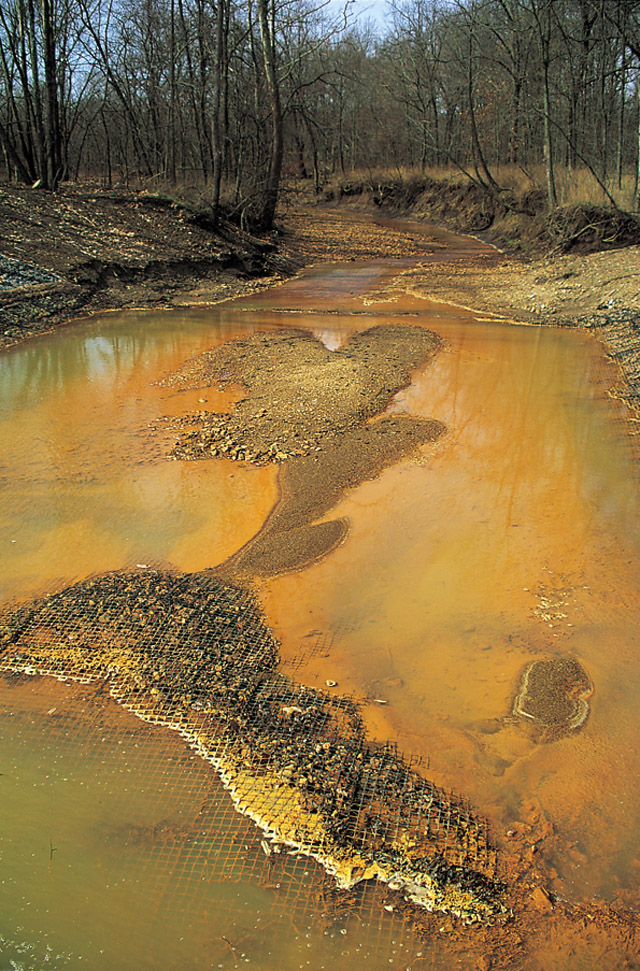
Yellow boy in a stream receiving acid drainage from surface coal mining

Water temperatures as high as 47 °C (117 °F) have been measured underground at the Iron Mountain Mine, and the pH can be as low as −3.6.

Organisms which cause acid mine drainage can thrive in waters with pH very close to zero. Negative pH occurs when water evaporates from already acidic pools thereby increasing the concentration of hydrogen ions.

About half of the coal mine discharges in Pennsylvania have pH under 5. However, a portion of mine drainage in both the bituminous and anthracite regions of Pennsylvania is alkaline, because limestone in the overburden neutralizes acid before the drainage emanates.

=== Yellow boy ===
When the pH of acid mine drainage is raised past 3, either through contact with fresh water or neutralizing minerals, previously soluble iron(III) ions precipitate as iron(III) hydroxide, a yellow-orange solid colloquially known as yellow boy. Other types of iron precipitates are possible, including iron oxides and oxyhydroxides, and sulfates such as jarosite. All these precipitates can discolor water and smother plant and animal life on the streambed, disrupting stream ecosystems (a specific offense under the Fisheries Act in Canada). The process also produces additional hydrogen ions, which can further decrease pH. In some cases, the concentrations of iron hydroxides in yellow boy are so high the precipitate can be recovered for commercial use in pigments.

=== Trace metal and semi-metal contamination ===
Many acid rock discharges also contain elevated levels of potentially toxic metals, especially nickel and copper with lower levels of a range of trace and semi-metal ions such as lead, arsenic, aluminium, and manganese. The elevated levels of heavy metals can only be dissolved in waters that have a low pH, as is found in the acidic waters produced by pyrite oxidation. In the coal belt around the south Wales valleys in the UK highly acidic nickel-rich discharges from coal stocking sites have proved to be particularly troublesome.

=== Effects on aquatic wildlife ===
Acid mine drainage also affects the wildlife living within the affected body of water. Aquatic macroinvertebrates living in streams or parts of streams affected by acid mine drainage show fewer individuals, less diversity, and lower biomass. Many species of fish also cannot tolerate the pollution. Among the macroinvertebrates, certain species can be found at only certain levels of pollution, while other species can be found over a wide range.

== Identification and prediction ==
In a mining setting it is leading practice to carry out a geochemical assessment of mine materials during the early stages of a project to determine the potential for AMD. The geochemical assessment aims to map the distribution and variability of key geochemical parameters, acid generating and element leaching characteristics.

The assessment may include:

1. Sampling;
2. Static geochemical testwork (e.g. acid-base accounting, sulfur speciation);
3. Kinetic geochemical testwork - Conducting oxygen consumption tests, such as the OxCon, to quantify acidity generation rates
4. Modelling of oxidation, pollutant generation and release; and
5. Modelling of material composition.

== Treatment ==
=== Oversight ===
In the United Kingdom, many discharges from abandoned mines are exempt from regulatory control. In such cases the Environment Agency and Natural Resources Wales working with partners such as the Coal Authority have provided some innovative solutions, including constructed wetland solutions such as on the River Pelenna in the valley of the River Afan near Port Talbot and the constructed wetland next to the River Neath at Ynysarwed.

Although abandoned underground mines produce most of the acid mine drainage, some recently mined and reclaimed surface mines have produced ARD and have degraded local groundwater and surface-water resources. Acidic water produced at active mines must be neutralized to achieve pH 6–9 before discharge from a mine site to a stream is permitted.

In Canada, work to reduce the effects of acid mine drainage is concentrated under the Mine Environment Neutral Drainage (MEND) program. Total liability from acid rock drainage is estimated to be between CA$2 billion and CA$5 billion. Over a period of eight years, MEND claims to have reduced ARD liability by up to CA$400 million, from an investment of CA$17.5 million.

=== Methods ===
==== Neutralization with calcium carbonate ====
Often, limestone rocks or appropriate calcareous strata that could contribute to neutralize acid effluents are lacking, or insufficiently accessible (too short contact time with acidic waters flowing too fast, too low specific surface area, insufficient contact...), at sites affected by acidic rock drainage. In such cases, crushed limestone can be dumped on site as a neutralizing agent.

However, although limestone is an unprocessed raw material available in large quantities and the least expensive neutralization agent, it can suffer from a number of disadvantages possibly limiting its applications. Indeed, small calcium carbonate grains of crushed limestone can be prone to the formation of a coating of gypsum (CaSO_{4}·2H_{2}O) surrounded by a thin impermeable and protective film of less soluble Fe-Al hydroxysulfate. This coating is sometimes referred to in the literature as an armor (shield, encrustation, rim, rind...). When present, it passivates the limestone surface, preventing calcite dissolution and the further release of bicarbonate in solution.

==== Neutralization with lime ====
Depending on the volume and flowrate of acid effluents to be neutralised and the scale of industrial installations, a common but more expensive commercial process for treating acid mine drainage is precipitation with lime in a high-density sludge (HDS) process. In this application, a slurry of lime (CaO – Ca(OH)_{2} after hydration) is dispersed into a tank containing acid mine drainage and recycled sludge to increase water pH to about 9. At this pH, most toxic metals become insoluble and precipitate, aided by the presence of recycled sludge. Optionally, air can be injected in the tank to oxidize iron(II) and manganese(II) and assist in their precipitation. The resulting slurry is directed to a sludge-settling vessel, such as a clarifier. In that vessel, clean water will overflow for release, whereas settled metal precipitates (sludge) are recycled to the acid mine drainage treatment tank, with a sludge-wasting side stream. A number of variations of this process exist, as dictated by the chemistry of ARD, its volume, and other factors. Generally, the products of the HDS process also contain gypsum (CaSO_{4}) and unreacted lime, which enhance both its settleability and resistance to re-acidification and metal mobilization.

A general equation for this neutralization process is:

H_{2}SO_{4} + Ca(OH)_{2} → CaSO_{4} + 2 H_{2}O

Less complex variants of this process, such as simple lime neutralization, may involve no more than a lime silo, a mixing tank and a settling pond. These systems are far less costly to build, but are also less efficient (longer reaction times are required, and they produce a discharge with higher trace metal concentrations, if present). They would be suitable for relatively small flows or less complex acid mine drainage.

==== Neutralization with calcium silicate ====
A calcium silicate feedstock, made from processed steel slag, can also be used to neutralize active acidity in AMD systems by removing free hydrogen ions from the bulk solution, thereby increasing pH. As the silicate anion captures H^{+} ions (raising the pH), it forms monosilicic acid (H_{4}SiO_{4}), a neutral solute. Monosilicic acid remains in the bulk solution and play many roles in correcting the adverse effects of acidic conditions. In the bulk solution, the silicate anion is very effective in neutralizing H^{+} cations in the soil solution. While its mode-of-action is quite different from limestone, the ability of calcium silicate to neutralize acid solutions is equivalent to limestone as evidenced by its CCE value of 90–100% and its relative neutralizing value of 98%.

In the presence of heavy metals, calcium silicate reacts in a different way than limestone. As limestone raises the pH of the bulk solution, when heavy metals are present, precipitation of the poorly soluble metal hydroxides is accelerated and the tendency for an impermeable metal hydroxide coating, termed armoring, to form on limestone grains surface increases significantly. Limestone grains become coated by a rind of gypsum encapsulated itself in a thin external film of impermeable and protective Fe-Al hydroxysulfate. Armoring slows the CaCO_{3} dissolution and prevents the limestone grains from releasing additional alkalinity in solution. In the calcium silicate aggregates, as silicic acid species are adsorbed onto the metal hydroxide surface, the development of silica layers (mono- and bi-layers) lead to the formation of colloidal complexes with neutral or negative surface charges. These negatively charged colloids are electrostatically repelled by each other (as well as with the negatively charged calcium silicate granules). The sequestered metal colloids are stabilized and remain in a stable dispersed state – effectively interrupting metal precipitation and reducing vulnerability of the material to armoring (formation of an impervious crust around material grains preventing their dissolution and decreasing their reactivity).

==== Removal of toxic metals by ion exchange ====
Cation exchange processes have previously been investigated as a potential treatment for acid mine drainage. The principle is that an ion-exchange resin can remove potentially toxic metals (cationic resins), or chlorides, sulfates and uranyl sulfate complexes (anionic resins) from mine water. Once the contaminants are adsorbed, the exchange sites on resins must be regenerated, which typically requires acidic and basic reagents and generates a brine that contains the pollutants in a concentrated form. A South African company that won the 2013 IChemE award for water management and supply (treating AMD) has developed a patented ion-exchange process that treats mine effluents (and AMD) economically.

==== Constructed wetlands ====
Constructed wetlands systems have been proposed during the 1980s to treat acid mine drainage generated by the abandoned coal mines in Eastern Appalachia. Generally, the wetlands receive near-neutral water, after it has been typically neutralized by a limestone-based treatment process. Metal precipitation occurs from their oxidation at near-neutral pH, complexation with organic matter, precipitation as carbonates or sulfides. The latter results from sediment-borne anaerobic bacteria capable of reducing sulfate ions into sulfide ions. These sulfide ions can then bind with heavy metal ions, precipitating heavy metals out of solution and effectively reversing the entire process.

The attractiveness of a constructed wetlands solution lies in its relative low cost. They are limited by the metal loads they can deal with (either from high flows or metal concentrations), though current practitioners have succeeded in developing constructed wetlands that treat high volumes (see description of Campbell Mine constructed wetland) and/or highly acidic water (with adequate pre-treatment). Typically, the effluent from constructed wetland receiving near-neutral water will be well-buffered at 6.5–7.0 and can readily be discharged. Some of the metal precipitates retained in sediments are easily oxidised and remobilised when exposed to atmospheric oxygen (e.g., copper sulfide or elemental selenium), and it is very important that the wetland sediments remain largely and permanently submerged to keep them insoluble and immobile. Prolonged droughts caused by climate warming might compromise the proper functioning and the safety of some constructed wetlands if during an extremely hot summer water supply decreases and evaporation accelerates causing them to dry up.

An example of an effective constructed wetland is on the Afon Pelena in the River Afan valley above Port Talbot where highly ferruginous discharges from the Whitworth mine have been successfully treated.

==== Precipitation of metal sulfides ====
Most base metals in acidic solution precipitate in contact with free sulfide, e.g. from H_{2}S or NaHS. Solid-liquid separation after reaction would produce a base metal-free effluent that can be discharged or further treated to reduce sulfate, and a metal sulfide concentrate with possible economic value.

As an alternative, several researchers have investigated the precipitation of metals using biogenic sulfide. In this process, sulfate-reducing bacteria (SRB) oxidize organic matter using sulfate as terminal electron acceptor, instead of oxygen. Their metabolic products include bicarbonate produced by organic matter oxidation, which can neutralize water acidity, and hydrogen sulfide, which forms highly insoluble precipitates with many toxic metals. Although promising, this process has been slow in being adopted for a variety of technical reasons.

=== Technologies ===
Various technologies have been developed and reviewed for the treatment of AMD, including passive treatment with biological agents, such as sulphate-reducing bacteria, magnetic neoparticles, bentonite, and other innovative materials.

== Metagenomic study ==
With the advance of large-scale sequencing strategies, genomes of microorganisms in the acid mine drainage community are directly sequenced from the environment. The nearly full genomic constructs allows better understanding of the community and the ability to reconstruct their metabolic pathways. Knowledge of acidophiles in acid mine drainage remains incomplete. There are more known species associated with ARD than known roles and functions.

== Microbes and drug discovery ==
Scientists have recently begun to explore acid mine drainage and mine reclamation sites for unique soil bacteria capable of producing new pharmaceutical leads. Soil microbes have long been a source for effective drugs and new research, such as that conducted at the Center for Pharmaceutical Research and Innovation, suggests these extreme environments to be an untapped source for new discovery.

== List of selected acid mine drainage sites worldwide ==
This list includes both mines producing acid mine drainage and river systems significantly affected by such drainage. It is by no means complete, as worldwide, several thousands of such sites exist.

=== Africa ===
- West Rand Goldfield, Witwatersrand, South Africa

=== Europe ===
- Avoca, County Wicklow, Ireland
- Aznalcollar mine on the Guadiamar, Spain
- Wheal Jane, Cornwall, England
- Tinto River, Spain
- Odiel River, Spain
- Libiola's mine, Italy
- Spree River, Germany
- The Lusatian Lake District and the Central German Lake District, both the product of open pit lignite mining, have to deal with acid mine drainage

=== North America ===
- Argo Tunnel, Idaho Springs, Colorado, US
- Berkeley Pit superfund site, covering the Clark Fork River and 50,000 acres (200 km^{2}) in and around Butte, Montana, US
- The Summitville Mine in Rio Grande County, Colorado. The area has both natural and mining-exacerbated acid drainage flowing into the Wrightman Fork, then into the Alamosa River, which flows into the San Luis Valley
- Britannia Beach, British Columbia, Canada
- Clinch-Powell River system, Virginia and Tennessee, US
- Iron Mountain Mine, Shasta County, California, United States
- Monday Creek, Ohio, US
- The Irwin Syncline in Southwestern Pennsylvania
- Pronto mine tailings site, Elliot Lake area, Ontario, Canada
- North Fork of Kentucky River, Kentucky, US
- Old Forge borehole, Lackawanna River, Pennsylvania. Discharges 40–100 million gallons of acid mine drainage per day.
- Cheat River Watershed, West Virginia, US
- Copperas Brook Watershed, from the Elizabeth Mine in S. Strafford, Vermont, impacting the Ompompanoosuc River
- Davis Pyrite Mine in NW Massachusetts
- Hughes bore hole, Pennsylvania
- Gold King Mine, Colorado, US
- AMD in Ontario, Canada

=== Oceania ===
- Brukunga, South Australia
- Grasberg mine, Papua province, Indonesia
- McArthur River zinc mine, Northern Territory, Australia
- Mount Morgan Mine, Queensland, Australia
- Ok Tedi environmental disaster caused by Ok Tedi Mine, Ok Tedi River, Papua New Guinea
- Tui mine, an abandoned mine on the western slopes of Mount Te Aroha in the Kaimai Range of New Zealand, considered to be the most contaminated site in the country
- West Coast mineral fields, Tasmania, Australia

== See also ==
- Bioleaching
- Environmental issues with mining
- International Mine Water Association
- Passive treatment system
- Uranium acid mine drainage
- Environmental impact of iron ore mining
