= Kimaam =

Kimaam or Kimam may refer to:

- Kimaam people, an ethnic group inhabiting Yos Sudarso Island (Kimaam Island) in the western part of Merauke Regency, South Papua Province, Indonesia.
- Kimaam language, a language spoken by the Kimaam people
- Yos Sudarso Island, Merauke Regency, Indonesia, also known as Kimaam Island, and homeland of the Kimaam people
- Kimaam, a district in Merauke Regency, Indonesia, and the main settlement on Yos Sudarso (Kimaam) Island
