= Kimaam people =

Ethnic group in Indonesia

Kimaam
Kimaghima
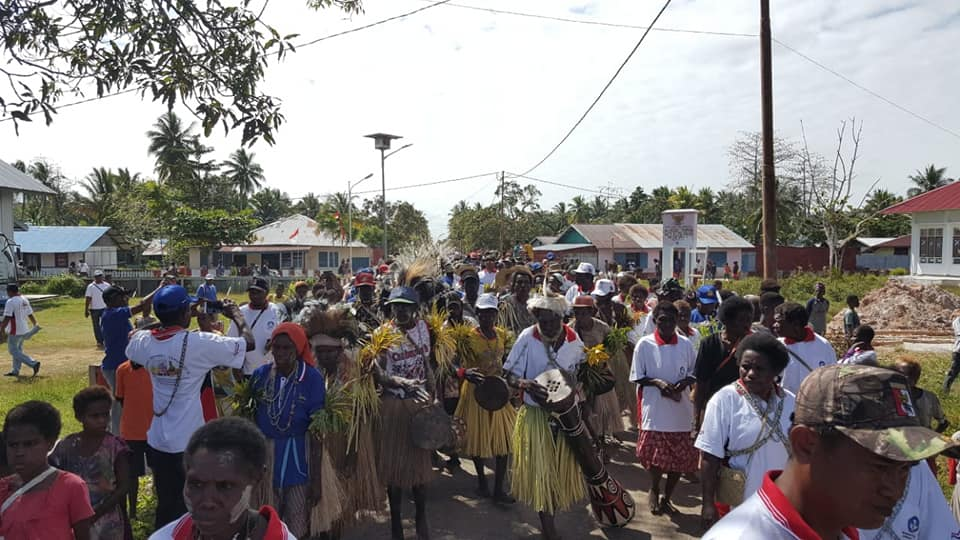
- Ndambu festival of the Kimaam people

Total population
- >10,000

Regions with significant populations
- Indonesia (South Papua)

Languages
- Kolopom languages (Kimaam, Riantana, Ndom)

Religion
- Christianity (predominantly), indigenous beliefs

Related ethnic groups
- Marind, Mombum, Marori

The Kimaam people (Riantana: Kimaghima or Kimaima) are an ethnic group inhabiting Yos Sudarso Island (Riantana: Kimaam) in the western part of Merauke Regency, South Papua Province, Indonesia.

The Kimaam people are considered a sub-group of the Marind people, although they speak languages within the Kolopom language family.

== Society ==
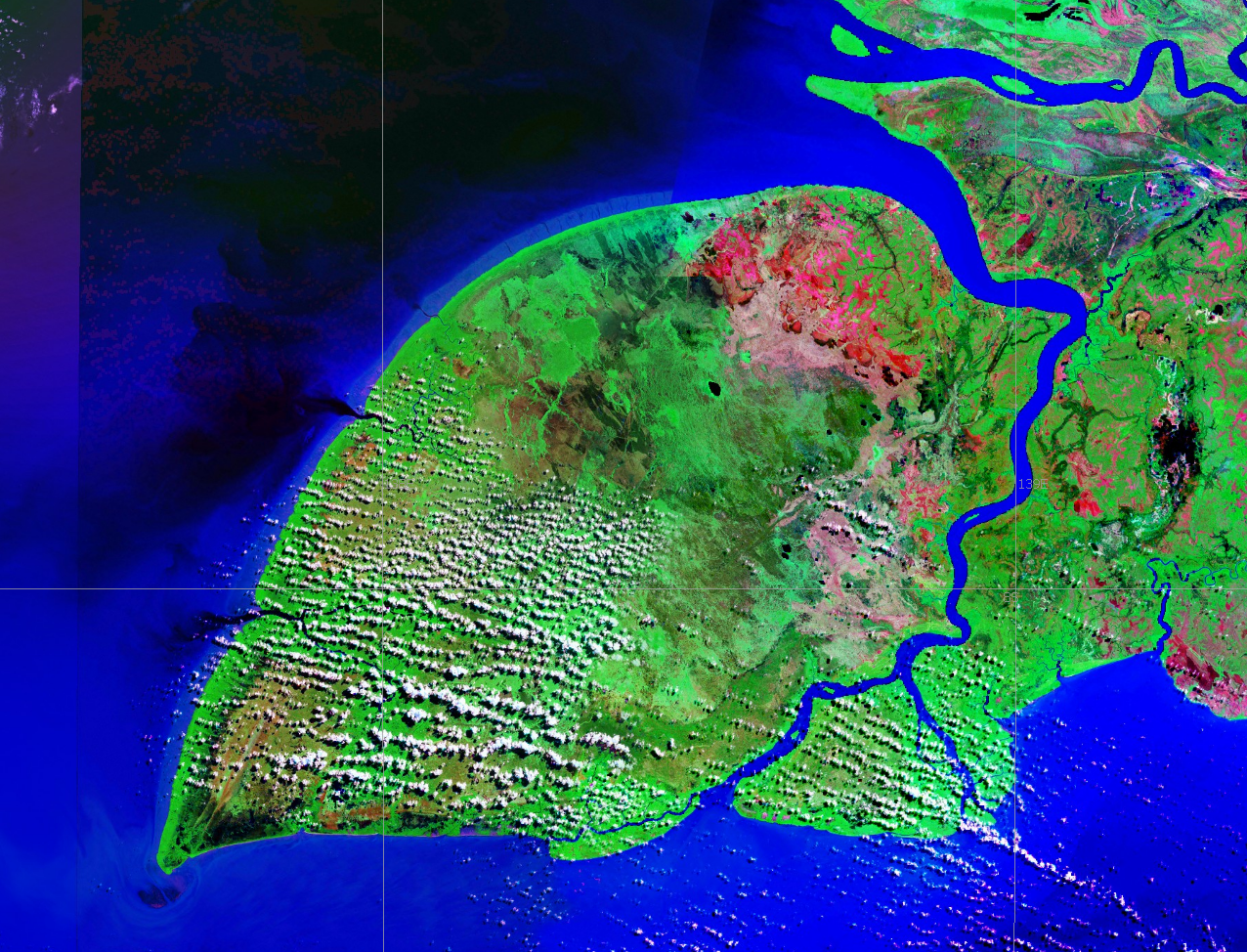
Satellite view of Yos Sudarso Island

The Kimaam Marind population is spread across various districts on Yos Sudarso Island (Kimaam Island), such as Kimaam, Waan, Tabonji, Padua, and Kontuar.

Most Kimaam speak the Kimaama language but some communities speak distinct languages in specific regions of the island — for example, the Riantana language in the northwest around Suam Village, Tabonji District, and the Ndom language spoken in Kalilam Village, Kimaam District.

Other languages closely related to each other form their own cluster, such as the Mombum language and Koneraw language in southern coastal Waan District.

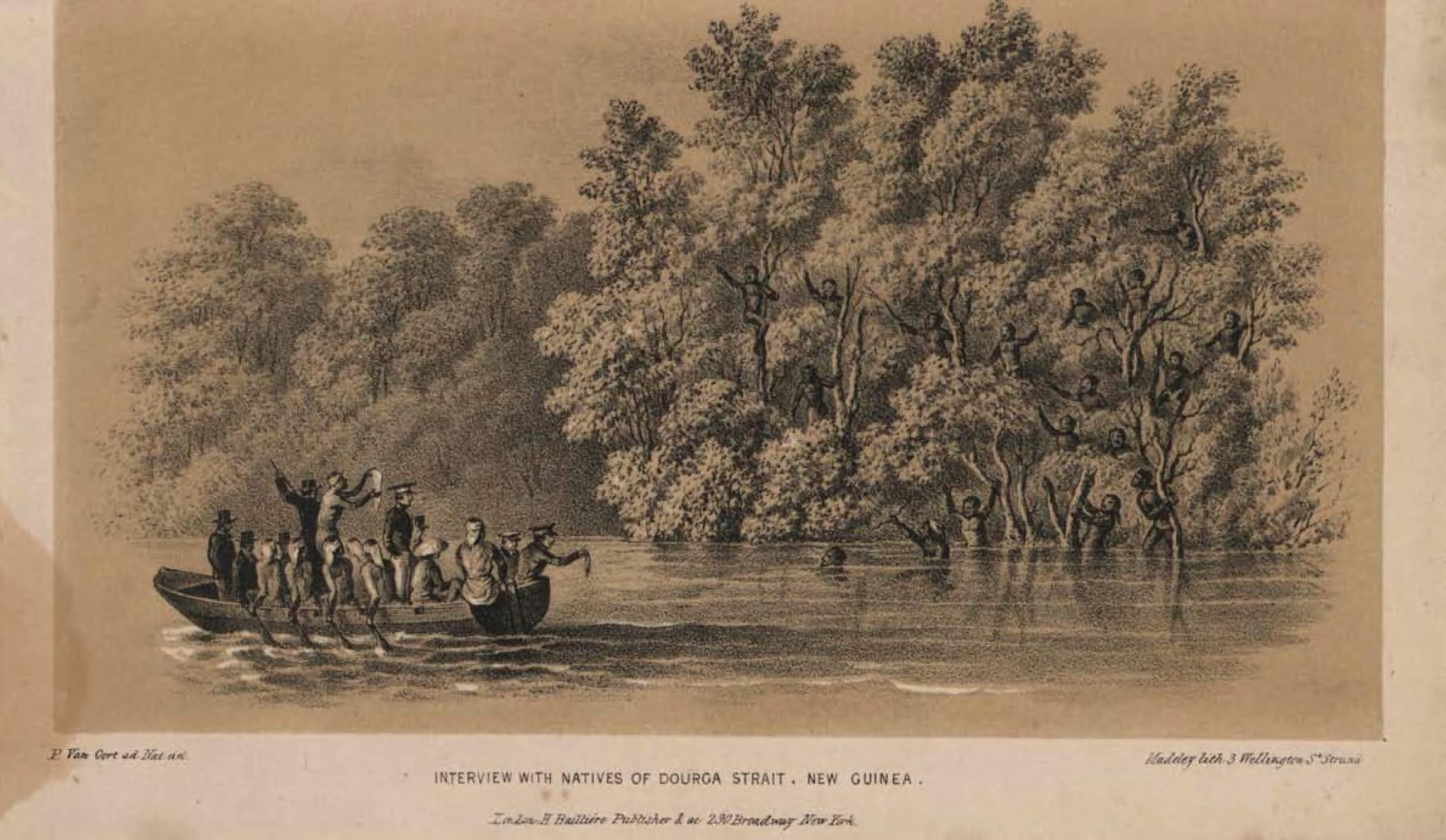
Illustration of the first encounter between a European expedition and the Kimaam people of the Dourga Strait, 1853

Kimaam Island lies in the western part of Merauke Regency and is accessible by boat and airplane, with an airstrip located in the capital of Kimaam District.

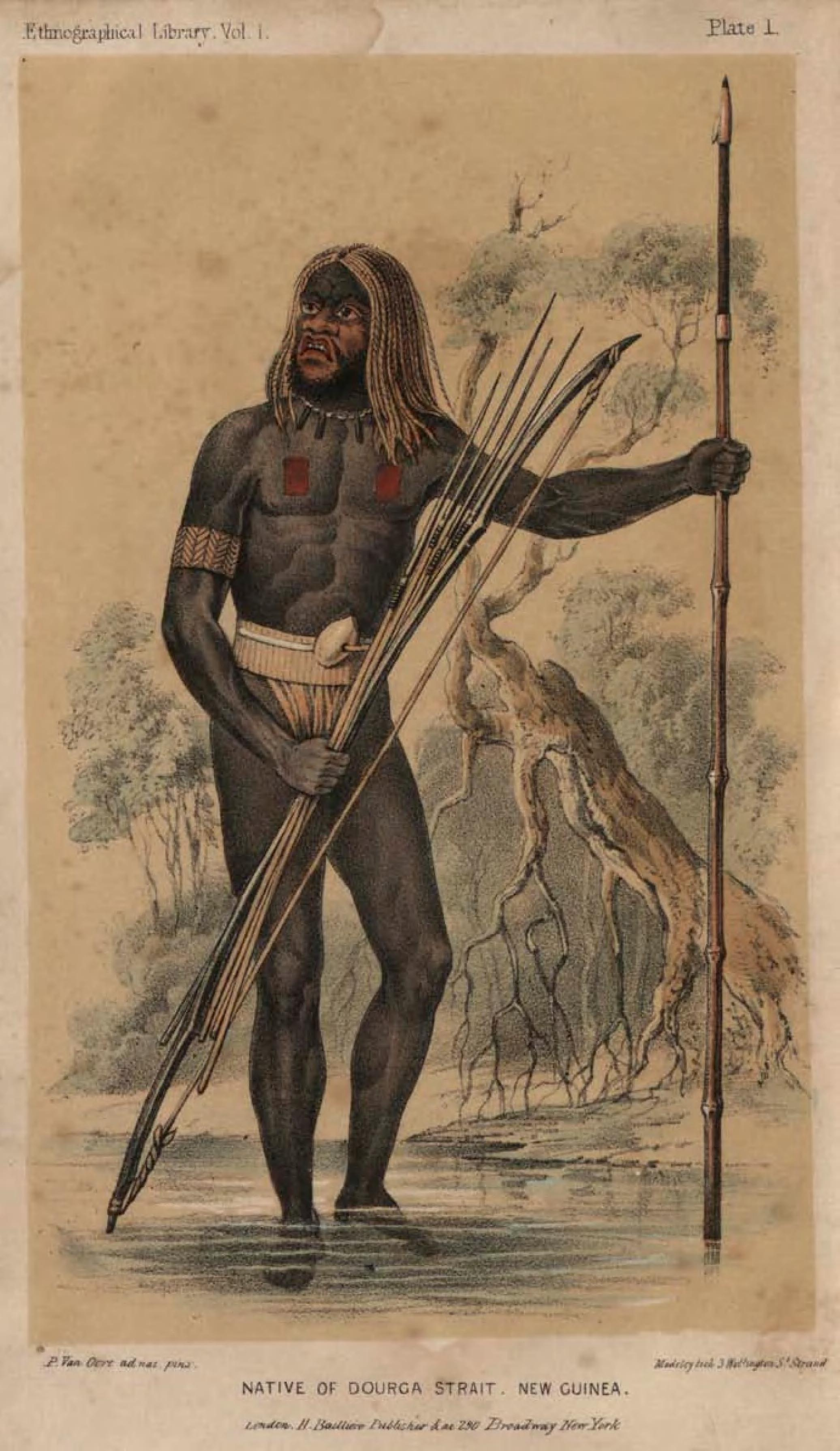
Illustration of the inhabitants of the Dourga Strait, the Kimaam people, 1853

The Kimaam people have their own institution, the Kimaam Indigenous Peoples Institute (Lemaskim), which is responsible for developing and preserving the customs, culture, and other cultural assets of Kimaam Island.

Ndambu ("healthy competition") is an annual traditional festival held on Kimaam Island, historically done to resolve disputes between villages, clans, and districts on the island. Activities featured in the festival include agricultural exhibitions, canoe races, traditional archery, wrestling, crab catching, weaving, sago processing, and canoe carving.

The island features lowland swamp terrain rich in forest and fishery resources. Unlike many other local groups in South Papua who rely heavily on forest products, the Kimaam people not only process sago but also cultivate gardens producing crops such as taro, sweet potatoes, and bananas; these agricultural products are displayed annually during Ndambu.
