= Melanesia =

Subregion of Oceania

Coordinates: 9°S 161°E

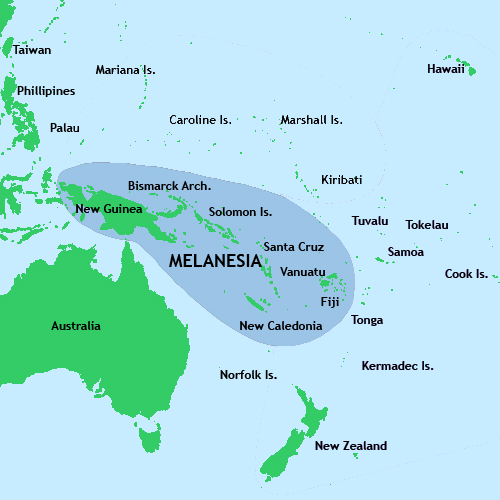
- Geographical map of Melanesia (cropped)

Population (2021)
  - Total: ▲14,373,536
- Demonym: Melanesian
- Countries: 4: Fiji; Papua New Guinea; Solomon Islands; Vanuatu
- Dependencies: External (1): New Caledonia (France) (Note: A sui generis collectivity of France.); Internal (7): (Maluku (province)) Aru Islands (Indonesia) (Note: A regency of the Maluku province.); Central Papua (Indonesia) (Note: A province of the Western New Guinea region.); Highland Papua (Indonesia); Papua (Indonesia); South Papua (Indonesia); Southwest Papua (Indonesia); West Papua (Indonesia)
- Languages: Over 1,000 languages

Melanesia (Note: UK: /ˌmɛləˈniːziə/, US: /ˌmɛləˈniːʒə/) is a subregion of Oceania in the southwestern Pacific Ocean. It extends from New Guinea in the west to the Fiji Islands in the east, and includes the Arafura Sea. Melanesia borders Southeast Asia to the west, Polynesia to the east, Micronesia to the north and Australia to the south.

The region includes the four independent countries of Fiji, Vanuatu, Solomon Islands, and Papua New Guinea. It also includes the Indonesian part of New Guinea, the French overseas collectivity of New Caledonia, and the Torres Strait Islands. Almost all of the region is in the Southern Hemisphere; only a few small islands that are not politically considered part of Oceania—specifically the northwestern islands of Western New Guinea—lie in the Northern Hemisphere.

The name Melanesia (French: Mélanésie) was first used in 1832 by French navigator Jules Dumont d'Urville: he coined the terms Melanesia and Micronesia to go alongside the pre-existing Polynesia to designate what he viewed as the three main ethnic and geographical regions forming the Pacific.

The indigenous people who inhabit the islands of Melanesia are called Melanesians. This is a heterogenous set of different genetic groups and ethnicities, different cultural practices (mythology, music, art, etc.), and different unrelated language families. Nonetheless, they together form a vast area with a long history of exchanges.

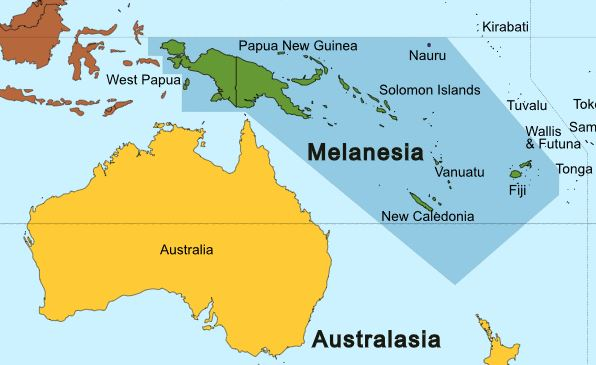
Map of Melanesia, showing its location within Oceania

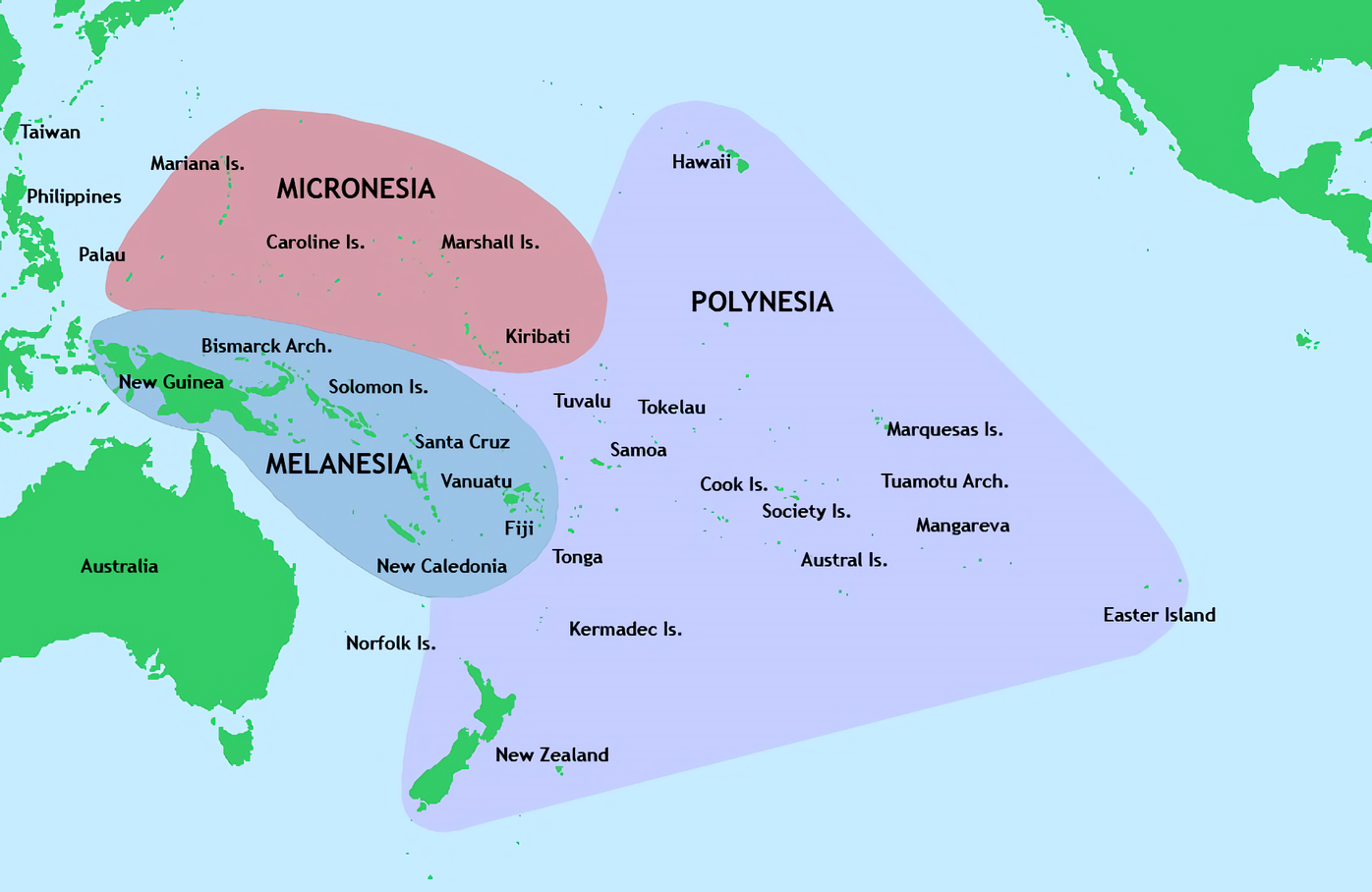
Melanesia is one of three major cultural areas of the Pacific Ocean islands, along with Micronesia and Polynesia.

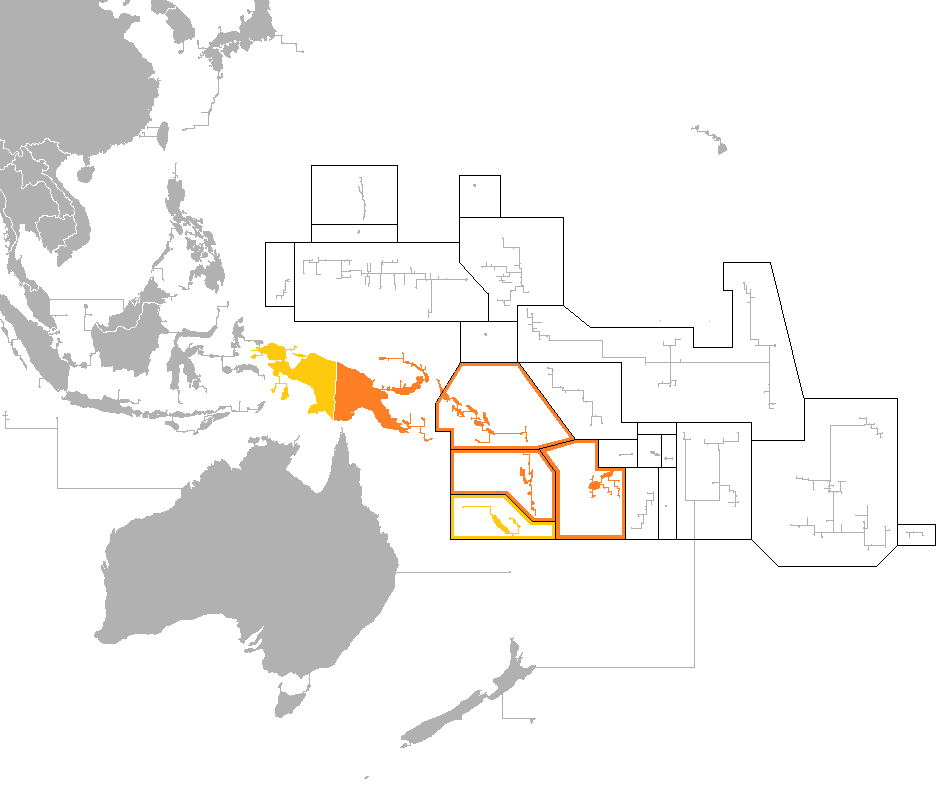
Outline of sovereign (orange) and dependent islands (yellow)

== Etymology and name ambiguity ==
The name Melanesia (from Ancient Greek: μέλας, romanized: mélas, lit. 'black', and Ancient Greek: νῆσος, romanized: nêsos, lit. 'island'), etymologically means "the Black Islands", in reference to the dark skin of the inhabitants.

The concept among Europeans of Melanesia as a distinct region evolved gradually over time as their expeditions mapped and explored the Pacific. Early European explorers noted the physical differences among groups of Pacific Islanders. In 1756, Charles de Brosses theorized that there was an "old black race" in the Pacific who had been conquered or defeated by the peoples of what is now called Polynesia, whom he distinguished as having lighter skin. In the first half of the nineteenth century, Jean-Baptiste Bory de Saint-Vincent and Jules Dumont d'Urville characterized Melanesians as a distinct racial group.

Over time, however, Europeans increasingly viewed Melanesians as a distinct cultural, rather than racial, grouping. Scholars and other commentators disagreed on the boundaries of Melanesia, descriptions of which were therefore somewhat fluid. In the nineteenth century, Robert Henry Codrington, a British missionary, produced a series of monographs on "the Melanesians", based on his long-time residence in the region. In his published works on Melanesia, including The Melanesian Languages (1885) and The Melanesians: Studies in Their Anthropology and Folk-lore (1891), Codrington defined Melanesia as including Vanuatu, Solomon Islands, New Caledonia, and Fiji. He reasoned that the islands of New Guinea should not be included because only some of its people were Melanesians. Also, like Bory de Saint-Vincent, he excluded Australia from Melanesia. It was in these works that Codrington introduced the Melanesian cultural concept of mana to the West.

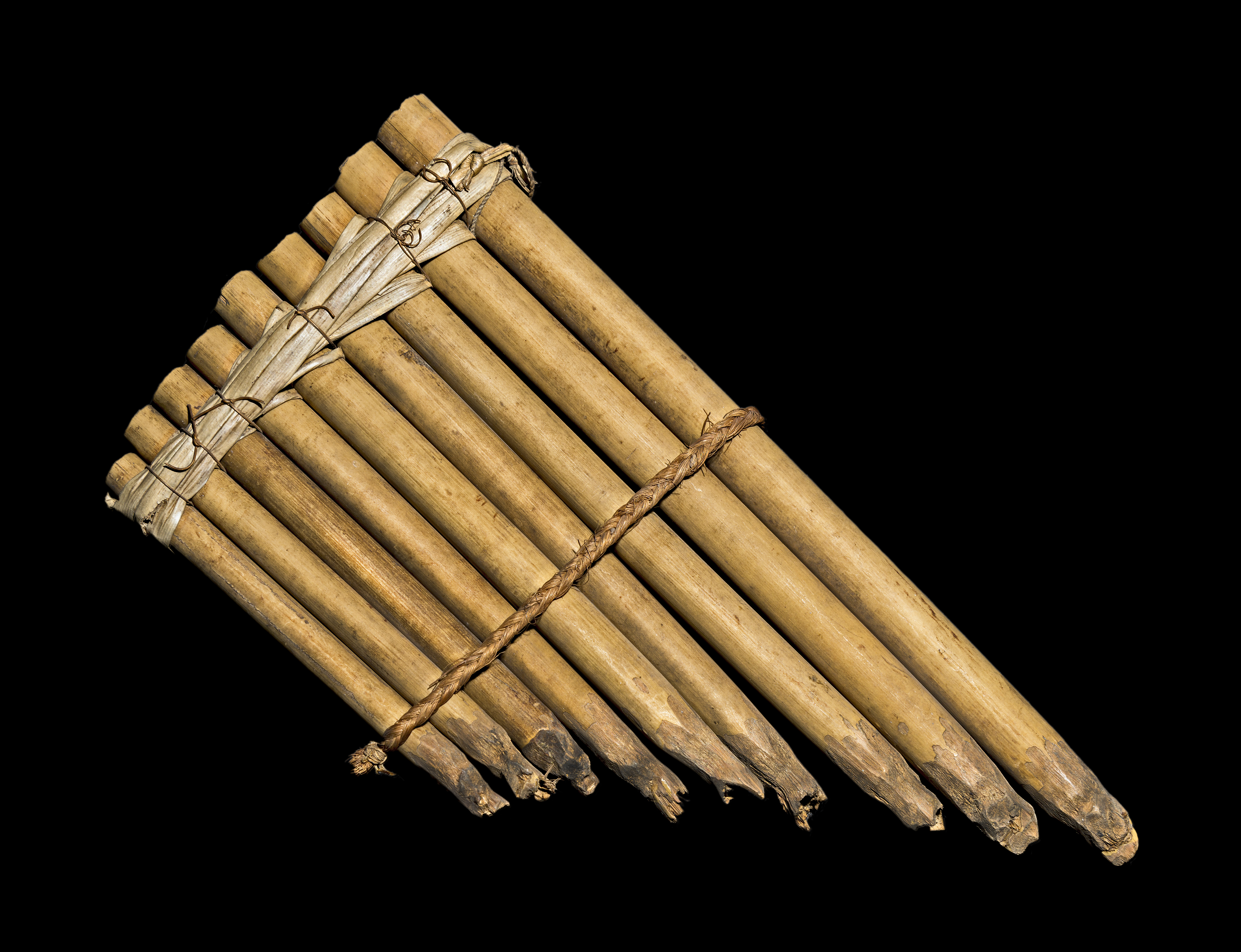
A pan flute from Solomon Islands, 19th century

Uncertainty about the best way to delineate and define the region continues to this day. The scholarly consensus now includes New Guinea within Melanesia. Ann Chowning wrote in her 1977 textbook on Melanesia that there is no general agreement even among anthropologists about the geographical boundaries of Melanesia. Many apply the term only to the smaller islands, excluding New Guinea; Fiji has frequently been treated as an anomalous border region or even assigned wholly to Polynesia; and the people of the Torres Straits Islands are often simply classified as Australian aborigines.

In 1998, Paul Sillitoe wrote: "It is not easy to define precisely, on geographical, cultural, biological, or any other grounds, where Melanesia ends and the neighbouring regions ... begins". He ultimately concludes that the region is a historical category which evolved in the nineteenth century from the discoveries made in the Pacific and has been legitimated by use and further research in the region. It covers populations that have a certain linguistic, biological and cultural affinity – a certain ill-defined sameness, which shades off at its margins into difference.

Both Sillitoe and Chowning include the island of New Guinea in the definition of Melanesia, and both exclude Australia. Most of the peoples of Melanesia live either in politically independent countries or in regions that currently have active independence movements, such as in Western New Guinea (Indonesia) and New Caledonia (France). Some have recently embraced the term "Melanesia" as a source of identity and empowerment. Stephanie Lawson writes that despite "a number of scholars finding the term problematic due to its historical associations with European exploration and colonisation, as well as the racism embedded in these", the term "has acquired a positive meaning and relevance for many of the people to whom it applies", and has "moved from a term of denigration to one of affirmation, providing a positive basis for contemporary subregional identity as well as a formal organisation". Additionally, while the terms "Polynesia" and "Micronesia" refer to the geographic characteristics of the islands, "Melanesia" specifically refers to the color of the inhabitants as the "black race of Oceania". The author Bernard Narokobi has written that the concept of the "Melanesian Way" as a distinct cultural force could give the people of the region a sense of empowerment. This concept has in fact been used as a force in geopolitics. For instance, when the countries of Vanuatu, Solomon Islands, Papua New Guinea, and Fiji reached a regional preferential trade agreement, they named it the Melanesian Spearhead Group.

== History ==
=== Ancient history ===
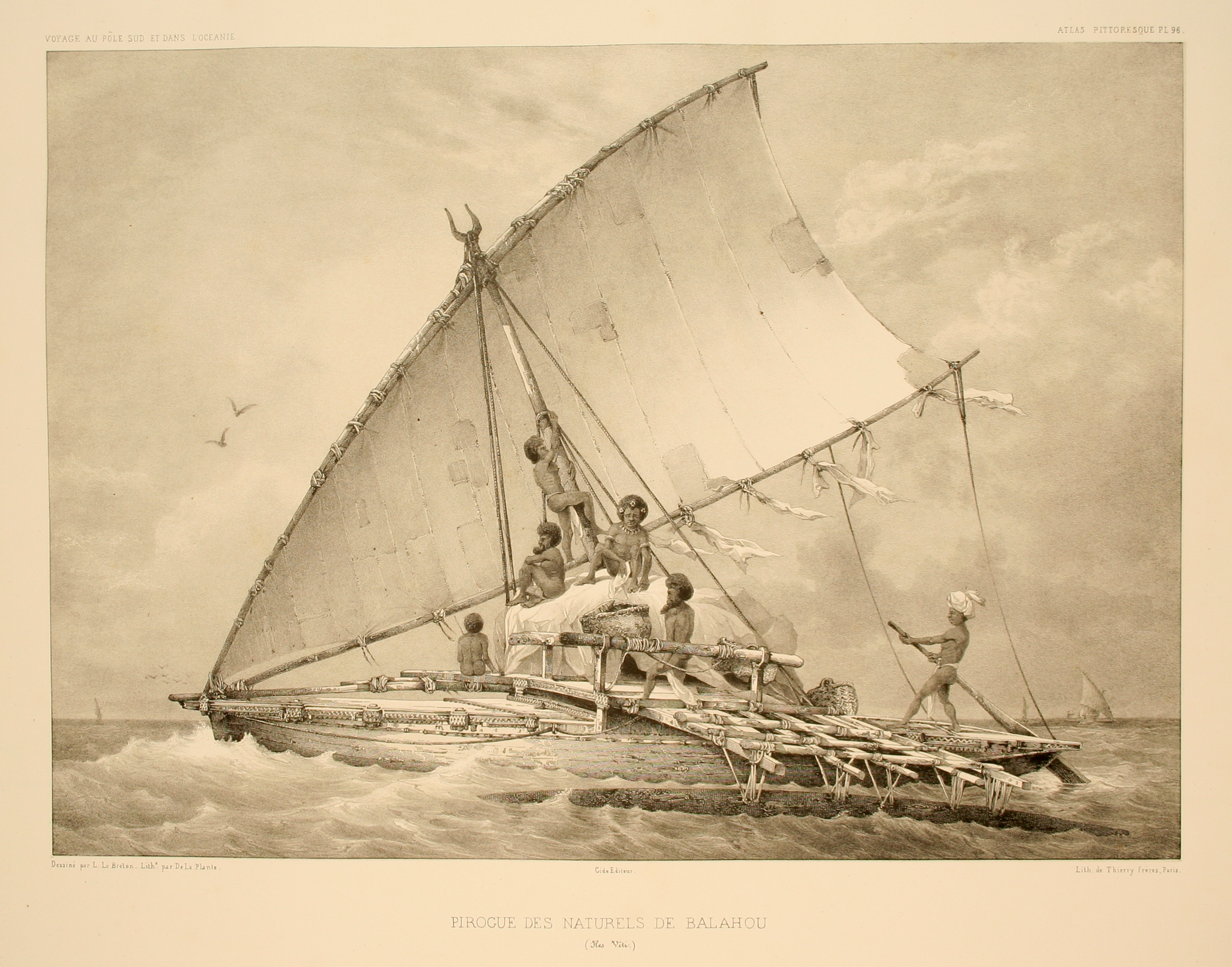
Sailors of Melanesia in the Pacific Ocean, 1846

Chronological dispersal of Austronesian peoples across the Indo-Pacific

The people of Melanesia have a distinctive ancestry. According to the Southern Dispersal theory, hominid populations from Africa dispersed along the southern edge of Asia some 50,000 to 100,000 years ago. For some, the endpoint of this ancient migration was the ancient continent of Sahul, a single landmass comprising both the areas that are now Australia and New Guinea. At that time, they were united by a land bridge, because sea levels were lower than in the present day. The first migration into Sahul was over 40,000 years ago. Some migrants settled in the part that is now New Guinea, while others continued south and became the aboriginal inhabitants of Australia.

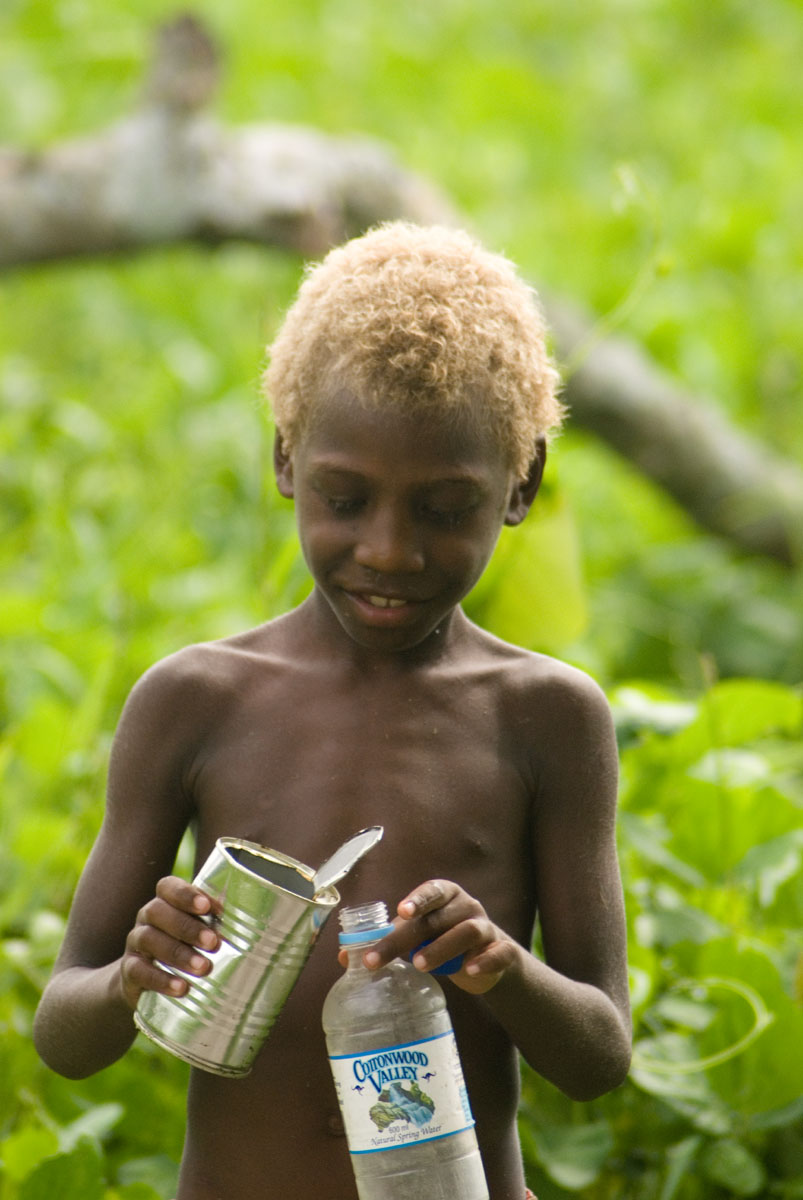
A Melanesian child from Vanuatu

Another wave of Austronesian migrants, originating ultimately from Taiwan, arrived in Melanesia much later, probably between 4000 and 3000 BC. They settled mostly along the north coast of New Guinea and on the islands to its north and east. When they arrived, they came into contact with the much more ancient indigenous Papuan-speaking peoples.

Some late-20th-century scholars developed a theory, known as the "Polynesian theory", that there then followed a long period of interaction between these newcomers and the pre-existing inhabitants that led to many complex genetic, linguistic, and cultural mixing and other changes among the descendants of all the groups. This theory was later called into question, however, by the findings of a genetic study published by Temple University in 2008. That study found that neither Polynesians nor Micronesians have much genetic relation to Melanesians. The study's results suggest that, after ancestors of the Polynesians, having developed sailing outrigger canoes, migrated out of East Asia, they moved quickly through the Melanesian area, mostly without settling there, and instead continued on to areas east of Melanesia, finally settling in those areas.

The genetic evidence suggests that they left few descendants in Melanesia, and therefore probably "only intermixed to a very modest degree with the indigenous populations there". The study did find a small Austronesian genetic signature (below 20%) in some of the Melanesian groups who speak Austronesian languages, but found no such signature at all in Papuan-speaking groups.

== Demographics ==
The countries and territories in this table are categorised according to the scheme for geographic subregions used by the United Nations. The information shown follows sources in cross-referenced articles; where sources differ, provisos have been clearly indicated. These territories and regions are subject to various additional categorisations, depending on the source and purpose of each description.

Arms	Flag	Name of region, followed by countries	Area (km^{2})	Population (2021)	Population density (per km^{2})	Capital	ISO 3166-1
Fiji	(Fiji)	Fiji	18,270	924,610	49.2	Suva	FJ
New Caledonia	(New Caledonia)	New Caledonia (France)	19,060	287,800	14.3	Nouméa	NC
	(Indonesia)	Aru Islands Regency, Maluku (Indonesia)	6,426	108,834	17	Dobo	ID (ID-MA)
	(Indonesia)	Central Papua (Indonesia)	61,073	1,431,000	23	Wanggar, Nabire Regency	ID (ID-PT)
	(Indonesia)	Highland Papua (Indonesia)	51,213	1,430,500	28	Walesi, Jayawijaya Regency	ID (ID-PE)
Papua (province)	(Indonesia)	Papua (Indonesia)	82,681	1,035,000	13	Jayapura	ID (ID-PA)
	(Indonesia)	South Papua (Indonesia)	117,849	522,200	4.4	Salor, Merauke Regency	ID (ID-PS)
	(Indonesia)	Southwest Papua (Indonesia)	39,123	621,904	16	Sorong	ID (ID-PD)
West Papua (province)	(Indonesia)	West Papua (Indonesia) (Note: West Papua was split from Papua province in 2003 but still retain autonomous status.)	60,275	561,403	9	Manokwari	ID (ID-PB)
Papua New Guinea	(Papua New Guinea)	Papua New Guinea	462,840	9,949,437	17.5	Port Moresby	PG
Solomon Islands	(Solomon Islands)	Solomon Islands	28,450	707,851	21.1	Honiara	SB
Vanuatu	(Vanuatu)	Vanuatu	12,200	319,137	22.2	Port Vila	VU
Melanesia (total)			1,000,231	14,373,536	14.4		

== Languages ==
Most of the languages of Melanesia are members of the Austronesian language family or one of the numerous Papuan languages. "Papuan languages" refers to their geographical location rather than implying that they are linguistically related. In fact they comprise many separate language families. By one count, there are 1,319 languages in Melanesia, scattered across a small area of land. On average, there is one language for every 716 square kilometers on the island. This is by far the densest collection of distinct languages on Earth, almost three times as dense as in Nigeria, a country famous for having a very large number of languages in a very compact area. Likewise, the archipelago of Vanuatu holds the world record of linguistic density per capita, with 138 distinct languages (not counting dialects) for a population of 0.3 million.

In addition to the many indigenous Melanesian languages, pidgins and creole languages have developed from trade and cultural interaction within the area and with the wider world. Most notable among these are Tok Pisin and Hiri Motu in Papua New Guinea. They are now both considered distinct creole languages. Use of Tok Pisin is growing. It is sometimes learned as a first language, above all by multi-cultural families. Examples of other Melanesian creoles are Unserdeutsch, Solomon Islands Pijin, Bislama, and Papuan Malay.

== Geography ==
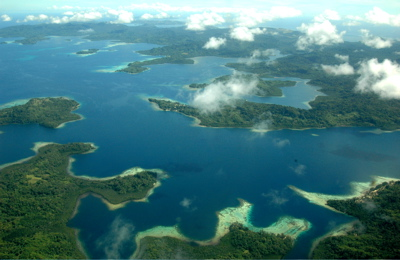
Aerial view of Solomon Islands

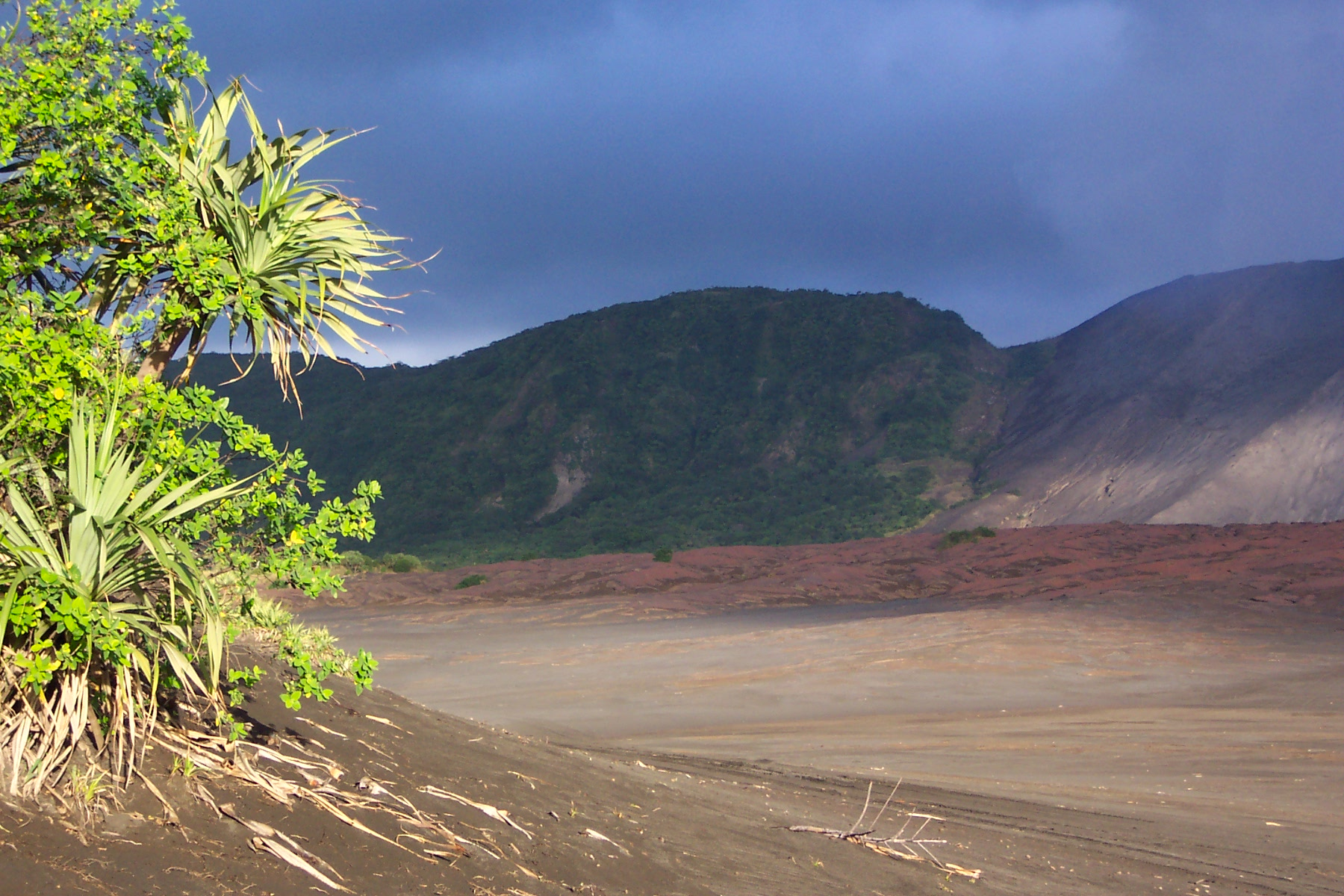
Cinder plain of Mount Yasur in Vanuatu

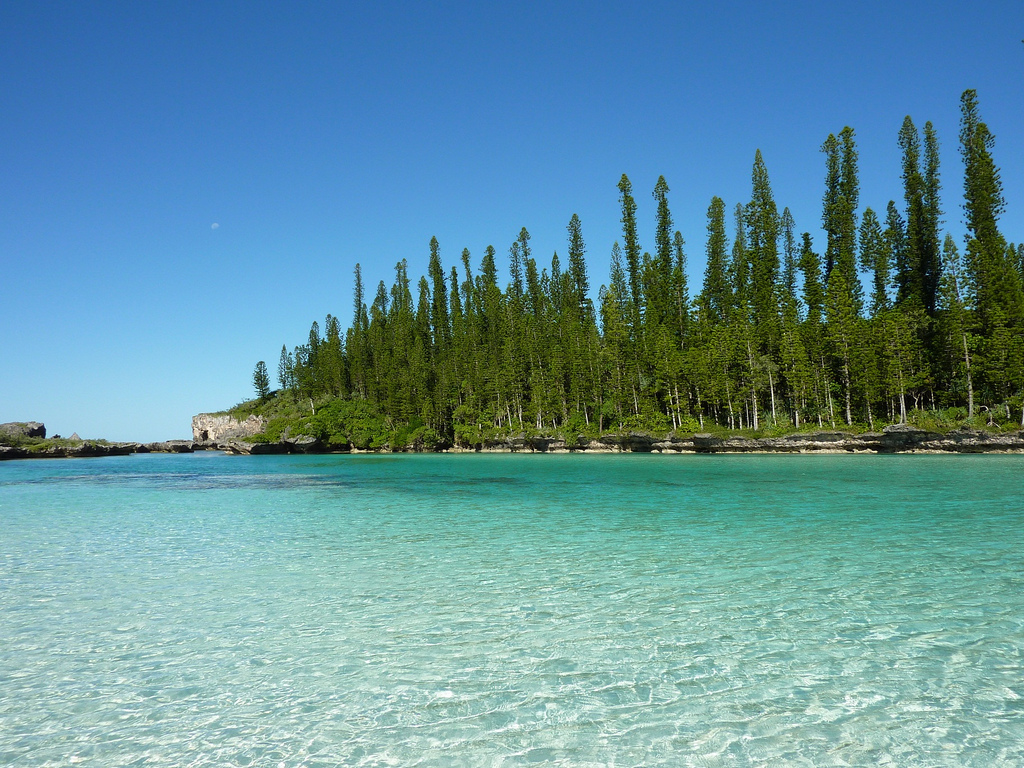
New Caledonia

Köppen-Geiger climate classification map of Melanesia

A distinction is often made between the island of New Guinea and what is known as Island Melanesia, which consists of "the chain of archipelagos, islands, atolls, and reefs forming the outer bounds of the sheltered oval-shaped coral sea". This includes the Louisiade Archipelago (a part of Papua New Guinea), the Bismarck Archipelago (a part of Papua New Guinea and Solomon Islands), and the Santa Cruz Islands (a part of the country called Solomon Islands). The country of Vanuatu is composed of the New Hebrides island chain (and in the past 'New Hebrides' has also been the name of the political unit located on the islands). New Caledonia is composed of one large island and several smaller chains, including the Loyalty Islands. The nation of Fiji is composed of two main islands, Viti Levu and Vanua Levu, and smaller islands, including the Lau Islands.

From the geological point of view, the island of New Guinea is part of the Australian continent. New Caledonia is geologically part of Zealandia, and so is Norfolk Island.

The names of islands in Melanesia can be confusing; they have both indigenous and European names. National boundaries sometimes cut across archipelagos. The names of the political units in the region have changed over time, and sometimes have included geographical terms. For example, the island of Makira was once known as San Cristobal, the name given to it by Spanish explorers. It is in the country Solomon Islands, which is a nation-state and not a contiguous archipelago. The border of Papua New Guinea and Solomon Islands separates the island of Bougainville from the nearby islands of Choiseul, although Bougainville is geographically part of the chain of islands that includes Choiseul and much of the Solomons.

In addition to the islands mentioned above, there are many smaller islands and atolls in Melanesia. These include:

- Aru Islands, Maluku, Indonesia
- Biak Islands, Papua, Indonesia
- D'Entrecasteaux Islands, Papua New Guinea
- Kolepom and Komolom Island, South Papua, Indonesia
- Norfolk Island, Australia (geographically only)
- Raja Ampat Islands, Southwest Papua, Indonesia
- Rotuma, Fiji
- Torres Strait Islands, politically divided between Australia and Papua New Guinea
- Trobriand Islands, Papua New Guinea
- Woodlark Island, Papua New Guinea
- Yapen Islands, Papua, Indonesia

Norfolk Island, listed above, has archaeological evidence of East Polynesian rather than Melanesian settlement. Rotuma in Fiji has strong affinities culturally and ethnologically to Polynesia.

== Political geography ==
The following four countries are considered parts of Melanesia:

- Fiji
- Papua New Guinea
- Solomon Islands
- Vanuatu

Melanesia also includes the following eight territories:

- New Caledonia (France)
- (Maluku (province)) Aru Islands (Indonesia)
- Central Papua (Indonesia)
- Highland Papua (Indonesia)
- Papua (Indonesia)
- South Papua (Indonesia)
- Southwest Papua (Indonesia)
- West Papua (Indonesia)

Several Melanesian states are members of intergovernmental and regional organizations. Papua New Guinea, Fiji, Solomon Islands, and Vanuatu are members of the Commonwealth of Nations and are also members of the Melanesian Spearhead Group.

== Genetic studies ==
Melanesians were found to have a third archaic Homo species along with their Denisovan (3–4%) and Neanderthal (2%) ancestors in a genetic admixture with their otherwise modern Homo sapiens genomes.

The frequent occurrence of blond hair among these peoples is due to a specific random mutation, different from the mutation that led to blond hair in peoples indigenous to northern regions of the globe. This is evidence that the genotype and phenotype for blond hair arose at least twice in human history.

== See also ==
- Australasia
- Micronesia
- Polynesia
- Indigenous people of New Guinea
- Melanesian Brotherhood
- Melanesian mythology
- Negrito (of Leyte, Agusan del Norte and Surigao)
- Wallacea

== Citations ==
- Bedford, Stuart (2014). "Melanesia". In C. Renfrew; P. Bahn (eds.). The Cambridge World Prehistory. Cambridge: Cambridge University Press. doi:10.1017/CHO9781139017831.043. ISBN 978-1-139-01783-1.
- François, Alexandre; Franjieh, Michael; Lacrampe, Sébastien; Schnell, Stefan (2015), "The exceptional linguistic density of Vanuatu" (PDF), in François, Alexandre; Lacrampe, Sébastien; Franjieh, Michael; Schnell, Stefan (eds.), The Languages of Vanuatu: Unity and Diversity, Studies in the Languages of Island Melanesia, Canberra: Asia Pacific Linguistics Open Access, pp. 1–21, CiteSeerX 10.1.1.730.9327, ISBN 9781922185235.
