= Ed Stafford: Into The Unknown =

2015 British documentary TV series

- Genre: Documentary
- Presented by: Ed Stafford
- Narrated by: Ed Stafford
- Country of origin: United Kingdom
- Original language: English
- No. of series: 1
- No. of episodes: 6

Production
- Running time: 60 minutes
- Production company: Keo Films

Original release
- Network: Discovery Channel
- Release: 27 August 2015 – present

Ed Stafford: Into The Unknown is a 2015 documentary television series commissioned by Discovery Channel and produced by Keo Films.

Ed Stafford is on a mission to investigate some of the planet's mysteries. Using photographs of Earth, taken by satellites, showing strange markings in some of the most remote places on the planet, he sets out to find the targets, and solve the riddles.

== Episodes ==
No.	Title	Original release date	UK viewers (millions)
0	"My Secrets of the Unknown"	?	N/A
This summary episode goes behind the scenes as Ed offers his tips on packing for an expedition and reflects on his personal highs and lows from his journey into the unknown through the other five episodes.
1	"West Papua"	27 August 2015	N/A
Location: Kimaam Island 7.925278°S 138.704722°E Ed sets out to find the cause of some mysterious white lines, covering a vast area in an uninhabited expanse of swamp on Kimaam Island – also known as Yos Sudarso – in West Papua. Helped by a team of travelling missionaries, he gets close to his target before having to venture alone into the swamp. It's slow progress and, as Ed closes in, his adventure takes a totally unexpected turn when he finds a group of indigenous people living in what was thought to be an uninhabitable swamp. As the mystery deepens, Ed is led to a settlement no outsiders have ever visited before. Among the villagers he undergoes a tribal initiation, and discovers a startling insight into an ancient way of life.
2	"Siberia"	3 September 2015	N/A
Location: Patomskiy crater 59.284472°N 116.589222°E Ed travels deep into the heart of Siberia to investigate the origins of a mysterious ring of shattered rock, known in local legend as the nest of a giant "fire eagle". With the appearance of a crater or rocky volcano in the otherwise unbroken expanse of the Taiga forest, the site continues to baffle scientists. Ed knows that cold weather locations are outside his expertise, and so he must rely on the locals for help. Ed is led to a group of semi nomadic indigenous Evenki people, whose reindeer sleds allow him to close in on his mysterious destination despite the bitter sub-zero temperatures, snowdrifts, and arduous terrain. However, the treacherous cold continues to set Ed back and, when he discovers he has frostbite, he must consider giving up.
3	"Ethiopia"	10 September 2015	N/A
Location: Danakil Desert 13.900152°N 40.388273°E Ed's target is a strange pattern of circular dots in the middle of the Danakil Desert in Ethiopia, the hottest place on earth and a dangerous disputed border zone. After his initial excitement and relief to be on his own in a wild and beautiful place, things start to go wrong. A camel carrying all of his precious water gives him the slip, and Ed risks heat exhaustion trying to recapture both the beast and the water he needs to survive. His health takes a serious turn for the worse, but Ed is determined to carry on to solve the riddle of the sands despite local tales of evil spirits and mysterious deaths in the desert.
4	"Brazil"	17 September 2015	N/A
Location: Mato Grosso 8.90936°S 56.718444°W Ed is back in his preferred terrain - the jungle of the Amazon - with his target a mysterious azure blue pool of water, deep in the remote Pará state in Brazil. Spotted on satellite imagery, the pool has no apparent way in and is protected by thick pristine jungle. Ed's expedition meets resistance from indigenous people who want to protect their land from outside interference and, in a dramatic twist, Ed is forced to consider a radical change of plan which pits him against a jungle environment that is far harder to negotiate than any he has encountered before.
5	"Zambia"	24 September 2015	N/A
Location: Zambezi River 14.748038°S 22.533833°E Ed's journey is inspired by an intriguing satellite image of some giant germ-like shapes, measuring up to 30 metres long, located in one of the most remote areas of western Zambia. To reach his target, Ed must cross the mighty Zambezi River and flood plain. His quest leads him to ask for help from the royal family of Barotseland, and he has a terrifying encounter with the local wildlife. As he nears the target, Ed is forced to travel with an armed guard, who becomes a valued companion. And, in order to complete his mission, Ed must first win the trust of local villagers who live cheek-by-jowl with some of the most dangerous wildlife in Africa.
