= Cape Kombies =

Cape on the southwestern coast of New Guinea

- Location in South Papua Location in Indonesia

Geography
- Location: Western New Guinea
- Coordinates: 8°21′56″S 138°57′50″E

Cape Kombies is a cape on the southwestern coast of New Guinea, near Yos Sudarso Island, in South Papua Province, Indonesia.

== History ==
During World War II, a radar station of the Australian Army was installed there, with the aim of spotting Japanese airplanes coming from the Aru islands or the Vogelkop to attack Merauke and the Torres Strait. The station operated from May 1943 until May 1945.
