= Gadiel Sánchez Rivera =

Peruvian adventurer

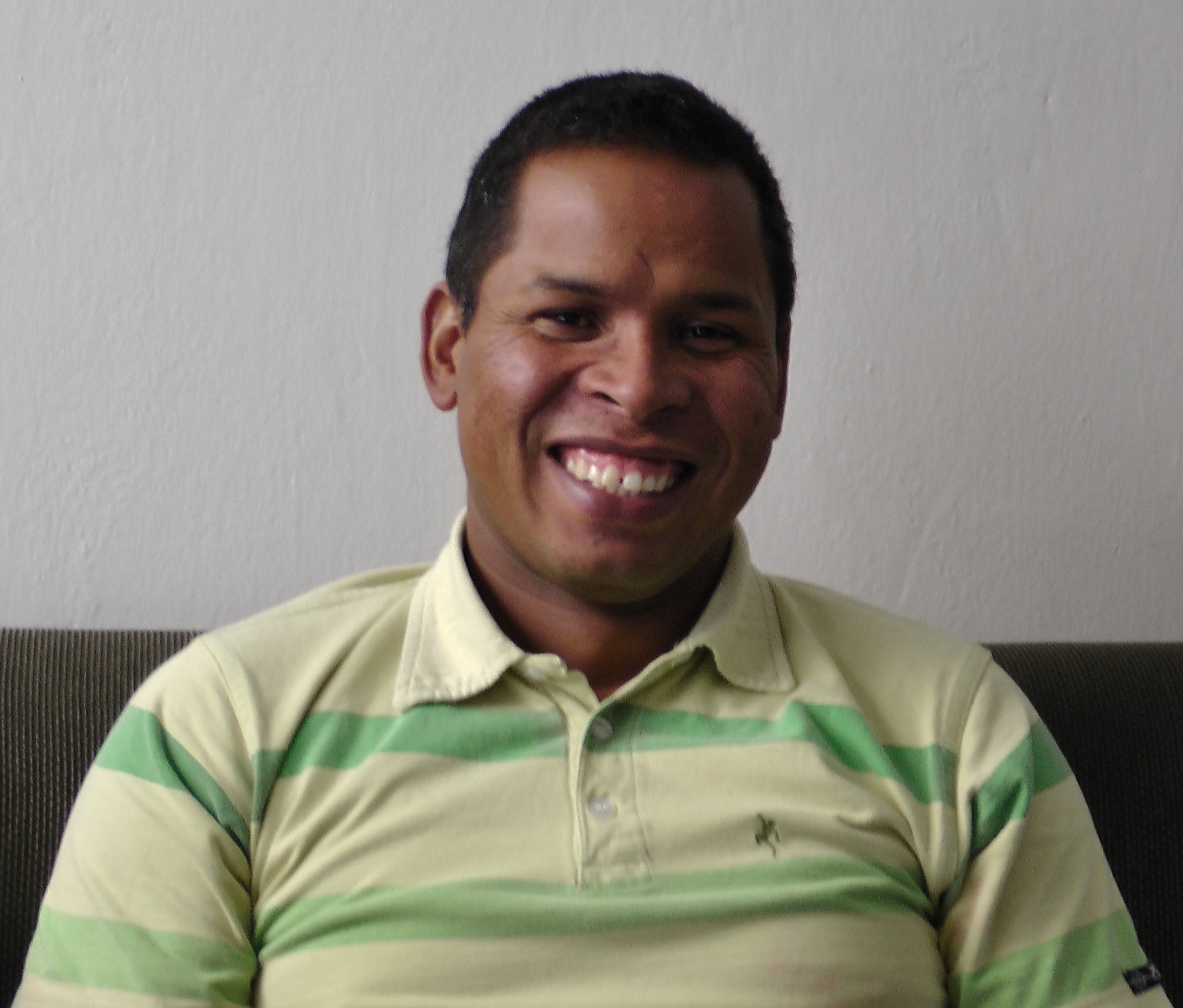
- Born: 13 October 1978 (age 46); Pucallpa, Peru
- Occupation(s): Guide, Adventurer, Forest worker

Gadiel “Cho” Sánchez Rivera is a Peruvian adventurer and jungle expert. In August 2010, “Cho” ended the walk along the Amazon River that fellow adventurer Ed Stafford had started. In 2013 he achieved the world first kayak tour of Lake Titicaca.

== Biography ==
Gadiel was born in 1978 in Pucallpa, Peru. He first worked as a farmer, then as a logger, but objected to the destruction of environment caused by logging.

== Expeditions ==
- 2008–2010 – Walking the Amazon with Ed Stafford. Jungle guide and team member. A two-part documentary of the same name aired on Discovery Channel.
- 2013 – TitiKayak expedition with Louis-Philippe Loncke. World first circumnavigation by kayak of lake Titicaca. Creation of the first geotagged photographic inventory of the lake: they took GPS coordinates of the location of the limit between the water and the ground and alongside photographs of the background. They also took underwater photos on the Northern Bolivian coast to locate the living habitat of the giant frog Telmatobius culeus. A talk was given by his expedition partner at TEDxFlanders.
- 2015 – Solo Amazon. Gadiel is hired as consultant and guide by Polish adventurer Marcin Gienieczko to traverse the dangerous jungle areas controlled by the drug lords.
- 2016 – He joined the party of Laura Bingham on her biking trip from Ecuador to Argentina.
