= Koneraw language =

Language in Papua

Koneraw
- Konorau
- Region: Yos Sudarso Island, West New Guinea
- Native speakers: (1,200 cited 2001)
- Language family: Trans–New Guinea: Central & South New Guinea ?; Mombum; Koneraw

Language codes
- ISO 639-3: kdw
- Glottolog: kone1241
- ELP: Koneraw

Koneraw is a Trans–New Guinea language spoken in West New Guinea, Indonesia. It was missed by classifications of Papuan languages until recently, but is clearly close to Mombum.

== Bibliography ==
Word lists

- Geurtjens, Hendrik. 1933. Marindineesch-Nederlandsch Woordenboek [Marind-Dutch Dictionary]. Bandoeng: Nix. (pages 397–429)
- Le Roux, C. C. F. M. 1950. De Bergpapoea’s van Nieuw-Guinea en hun Woongebied [The Mountain Papuans of New Guinea and their Habitat]. Vol 2. Leiden: E. J. Brill.
