= Mombum languages =

Pair of Trans-New Guinea languages

Mombum
- Komolom; Muli Strait
- Geographic distribution: Komolom Island, southern New Guinea
- Linguistic classification: Trans–New Guinea: Asmat–Mombum; Mombum

Language codes
- Glottolog: momb1255
- Map: The Mombum languages of New Guinea The Mombum languages Other Trans–New Guinea languages Other Papuan languages Austronesian languages Uninhabited

The Mombum languages, also known as the Komolom or Muli Strait languages, are a pair of Trans–New Guinea languages, Mombum (Komolom) and Koneraw, spoken on Komolom Island just off Yos Sudarso Island, and on the southern coast of Yos Sudarso Island, respectively, on the southern coast of New Guinea. Komolom Island is at the southern end of the Muli Strait.

== History of classification ==
Mombum was first classified as a branch isolate of the Central and South New Guinea languages in Stephen Wurm's 1975 expansion for Trans–New Guinea, a position tentatively maintained by Malcolm Ross, though he cannot tell if the similarities are shared innovations or retentions from proto-TNG. Usher instead links them to the Asmat languages. Koneraw is clearly related to Mombum, but was overlooked by early classifications. Along with the Kolopom languages, they are the languages spoken on Yos Sudarso Island (Kolopom Island).

Noting insufficient evidence, Pawley and Hammarström (2018), who refer to the languages as the Komolom branch, tentatively leave it as unclassified rather than as part of Trans-New Guinea.

== Pronouns ==
Pronouns are:

	sg	pl
1	*nu	*nu-mu, *ni
2	*yu	*yu-mu
3	*eu

== Vocabulary comparison ==
The following basic vocabulary words are from McElhanon & Voorhoeve (1970) and Voorhoeve (1975), as cited in the Trans-New Guinea database.

The words cited constitute translation equivalents, whether they are cognate (e.g. wonderam, wondrum for “head”) or not (e.g. iŋar, itöx for “bone”).

gloss	Koneraw	Mombum
head	wonderam	wondrum
hair	cin	xu-sin
eye	dyan	musax-nam
tooth	cire	zix
leg	kan	kaŋk
louse	am	am
dog	ubui	ipwi
pig	u	u
bird	baŋa	konji
egg		yausil
blood	iri	iri
bone	iŋar	itöx
skin	par	par
tree	to	tu
man	nam	nam
sun	dzuwo	zawa
water	mui	mwe
fire	war	wad
stone	mate	mete
name	ur	ur
eat	gim-nugu	nuku-
one	tenamotere	te
two	kuinam	kumb
