= Komoran Island =

Island in South Papua, Indonesia

Komoran
Native name: Pulau Komolom
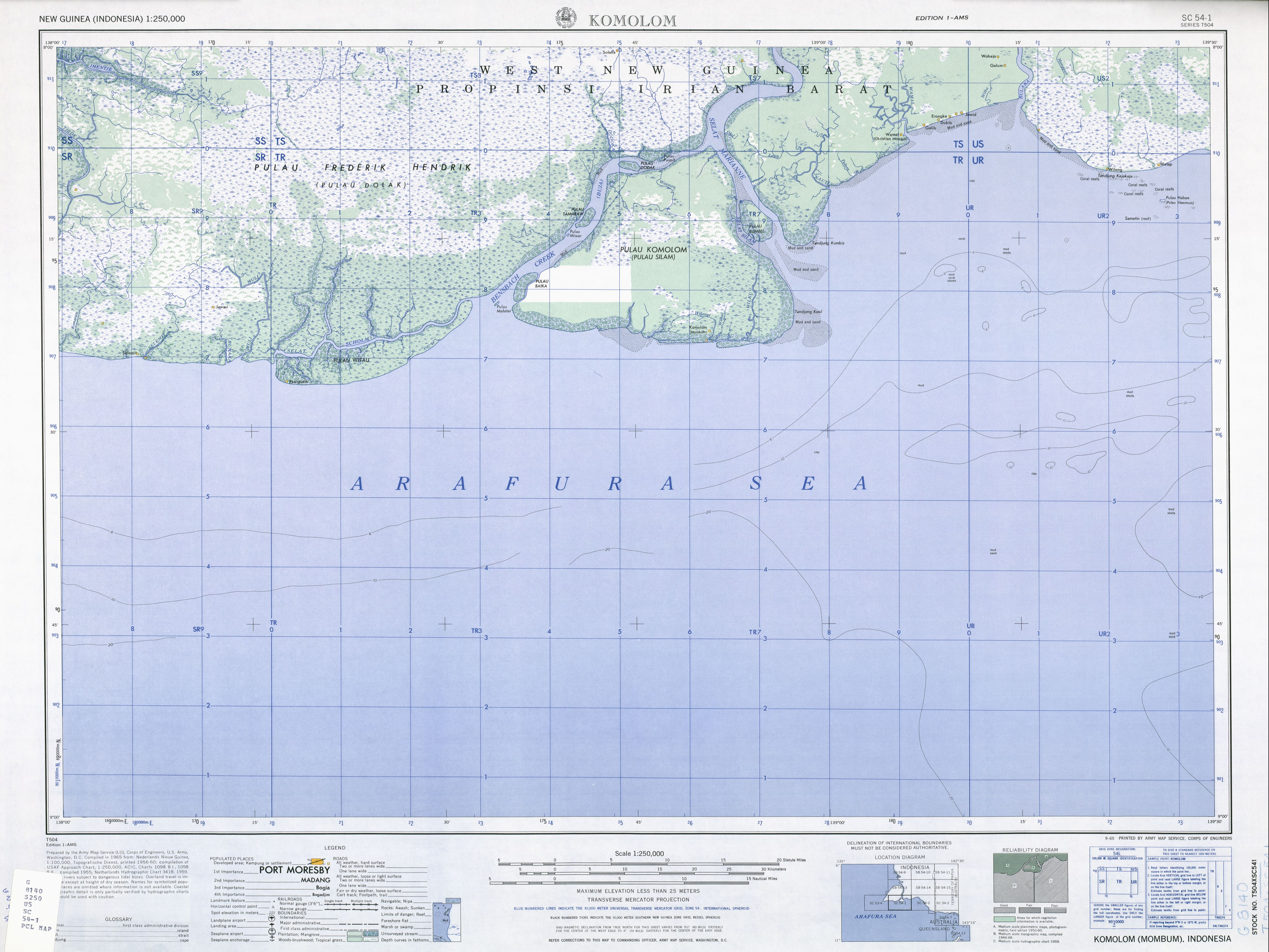
- Komoran and south-eastern Yos Sudarso Island on a 1944 map

- Location within Western New Guinea

Geography
- Location: Arafura Sea
- Coordinates: 8°16′S 138°46′E
- Area: 695.3 km^{2} (268.5 sq mi)

Administration
- Indonesia
- Province: South Papua
- Regency: Merauke Regency
- District: Kimaam

Demographics
- Population: 465 (2023)

Komoran, also Komolom or Silam (Indonesian: Pulau Komolom), is an island off the south coast of New Guinea in Merauke Regency, South Papua province, Indonesia. It lies immediately south-east of the much larger Yos Sudarso Island (Frederik Hendrik Island), at the southern end of the Muli Strait. The UNEP Island Directory gives its area as 695.3 km^{2}.

== Geography ==
Komoran lies on the south coast of New Guinea, immediately south-east of Yos Sudarso Island (formerly Frederik Hendrik or Dolak Island), from which it is separated by a narrow channel. (Note: Early-20th-century Dutch sources, including the Encyclopaedie van Nederlandsch-Indië, call this channel the Bensbach Creek.) The southernmost part of the Muli Strait separates the island from the New Guinea mainland. Sources differ on its status: the Winkler Prins encyclopedia describes Komoran as a smaller island set against Yos Sudarso, while the missionary ethnographer Jan Boelaars treats Komolom as the southern point of Yos Sudarso itself, the rest of which is called Kolopom. The island is low and marshy. The UNEP Island Directory records an area of 695.3 km^{2}, a shoreline of about 116 km and no measured high point, and places the island on the Arafura Sea.

== History ==
The waters around the island were charted by the Dutch naval vessels Dourga, Triton, Sireen and Postillon between 1826 and 1835; the channel first taken for the "Dourga River" was found in 1835 to be the Prinses Marianne, or Muli, Strait. Dutch Catholic missionaries reached Komolom in the early 1930s; a mission school with about seventy pupils was running there by 1931, and Father Wilhelm Thieman worked from the island from 1936.

== Administration and population ==
Komoran forms the village (kampung) of Komolom in Kimaam District, Merauke Regency; it is the district's most distant village from the seat at Kimaam, about 27 km away. The village recorded 465 residents in 2023, 227 male and 238 female, in civil-registration data.

== Conservation ==
Much of the island is protected as the Komolom Island Wildlife Reserve (Suaka Margasatwa Pulau Komolon), managed by the Papua office of the conservation agency, BBKSDA Papua, with an official area of 68,306.30 hectares. The reserve was designated under a Minister of Forestry decree of 10 November 1982.

== Language ==
The islanders speak Mombum, also called Komolom, a Papuan language of the small Mombum family. The 1918 Encyclopaedie van Nederlandsch-Indië recorded the village of Momboem on the island's south coast.
