= Ed Stafford =

English explorer (born 1975)

- Born: Edward James Stafford; 26 December 1975 (age 50); Peterborough, England, United Kingdom
- Education: Newcastle University
- Occupation: Explorer
- Spouse: Laura Bingham (m. 2016)
- Children: 4

Edward James Stafford (born 26 December 1975) is an English explorer and survivalist. He holds the Guinness World Record for being the first human ever to walk the length of the Amazon River. Stafford now hosts shows on the Discovery Channel and Channel Four.

== Early life and education ==
Ed Stafford was born in Peterborough, Cambridgeshire, England and raised in Leicestershire. He was adopted as a baby by Barbara and Jeremiah Stafford, who were both solicitors in Leicestershire. He was educated at Uppingham and was a Cub and a Scout in Leicestershire. Stafford graduated with a BSc in Geography from Newcastle University in 1997.

== Military career ==
Stafford joined the Royal Military Academy Sandhurst in September 1998, and after a year's training he was commissioned in the Devonshire and Dorset Regiment of the British Army as a subaltern on 7 August 1999: he was granted seniority in the rank of subaltern (second lieutenant) from 10 August 1996 and of subaltern (lieutenant) from 10 August 1998. His service number was 550823. He served a tour of duty in Northern Ireland in 2000. He was promoted to captain on 8 February 2002, before leaving the British Army on 7 August 2002.

== Exploration and survival career ==
On 9 August 2010, he became the first person to have walked the entire length of the Amazon River, documented in the 2011 TV series Walking the Amazon on Channel 5. Stafford's expedition began with a friend, Luke Collyer, on 2 April 2008, on the southern coast of Peru. Collyer left after three months, and Stafford completed the journey with his guide, Gadiel “Cho” Sánchez Rivera. He undertook the attempt for several charities.

Stafford ran out of money halfway through his hike and had to rely on making YouTube videos featuring PayPal links asking viewers for money. He later described this as "crowdfunding before it had even been invented". He was also held up both at gunpoint and by bow and arrow, and arrested for both drug smuggling and murder – the latter occurring when he coincidentally arrived in an isolated settlement the same day as a community member had gone missing. He was locked in a wooden hut for eight hours before being allowed to continue his journey.

In May 2009 Stafford appeared on the cover of the Royal Geographical Society's Geographical magazine.

Amazon route

In May 2008 Stafford was made Diane Sawyer's ABC News "Person of the Week".

Stafford's accomplishment of walking the Amazon river has been described by Sir Ranulph Fiennes as being "truly extraordinary...in the top league of expeditions past and present".

Stafford was announced as one of National Geographic Adventurers of the Year 2010 and then in March 2011 he was awarded European Adventurer of the Year in a ceremony in Stockholm, Sweden.

In 2011 Guinness World Records recognised Stafford's achievement and he appears in the 2012 Guinness Book of Records.

Also in 2011, Stafford was awarded the Mungo Park Medal by the Royal Scottish Geographical Society. He was not presented the award until 2014 at an event in Perth, Scotland.

Commissioned by Discovery Communications, in August 2012 Stafford filmed a three-part special for Discovery Channel where he was dropped on the uninhabited tropical island of Olorua (18°36′19″S 178°45′15″W) in the Pacific for 60 days with no food or equipment to help him survive. "Ed Stafford: Naked and Marooned" was aired on Discovery Channel in the UK in March 2013 and "Naked Castaway" (US version) aired in the USA in April of the same year. Stafford's book of the 60 days in isolation was released in the UK (Virgin Books) in June 2014 and was released in the USA (Penguin Books) in September 2014.

Stafford appears on Discovery Channel in his self-filmed series Marooned with Ed Stafford that is a joint Europe and US Discovery Channel commission. The series was followed up by Ed Stafford: Into The Unknown, which follows Stafford on his travels to remote locations to investigate strange and inexplicable markings which have baffled scientists. The programme aired on the Discovery Channel UK and its international subsidiaries in the latter part of 2015.

The series Ed Stafford: Left For Dead, another survival show, premiered in the autumn of 2017.

=== Ed Stafford: First Man Out ===
A survival show, Ed Stafford: First Man Out with a competition format began production in 2018, and premiered in early 2019. In the show, Stafford meets one other survival expert each week in a different part of the world where each competes to complete a difficult trek with minimal provisions. Stafford's six competitors in season one are: Aldo Kane, (Borneo, episode one), Khen Rhee (Kazakhstan, episode two), Matt Graham (Mongolia, episode three), EJ Snyder (Thailand, episode four), Cat Bigney (Palau, episode five) and John Hudson (India, episode six). Series two of First Man Out was filmed entirely in China and premiered in early 2020; Stafford's six competitors in season two are: Will Lord (Bashan, episode one), Josh James (Yunnan Province, episode two), Ky Furneaux (Four Girls Mountain Range, episode three), Matt 'The Juggernaut' Wright (Wanshan Archipelago, episode four), Hakim Isler (Zoige Marshes, episode five) and Xinlei Wu (Aksai Desert, episode six).

== Personal life ==
After his Amazon expedition Stafford began a search for his biological parents, whom he managed to track with the help of his sister, Janie. He explained, "There had always been this background intrigue. I looked for my birth family, not because I needed new parents in my life, but because it's just inherent to want to know." From his biological family, he has two younger brothers.

On 3 September 2016, Stafford married fellow explorer, Laura Bingham in Leicestershire.

On 6 June 2017 Stafford announced via Twitter that Bingham had given birth to a boy. On 26 August 2020, Stafford's wife gave birth to twin girls. On 3 April 2024, Bingham gave birth to their fourth child, a girl.

In April 2023 Stafford, Bingham and their children moved to Costa Rica.

== Prince's Rainforests Project ==
In August 2009 Stafford started writing a biweekly blog for the Prince's Rainforests Project.

== Filmography ==
| Year | Television series | Channel/Network | Notes | Ref |
|---|---|---|---|---|
| 2011 | Walking the Amazon | Channel 5 and Discovery | two-part documentary | |
| 2013–2025 | Ed Stafford: Naked and Marooned | Discovery | 4 series; 25 episodes | |
| 2015 | Ed Stafford: Into The Unknown | Discovery | 1 series; 6 episodes | |
| 2016 | Burma's Secret Jungle War with Joe Simpson | BBC Two | two-part documentary | |
| 2017 | Ed Stafford: Left For Dead | Discovery | 1 series; 6 episodes | |
| 2019 | 60 Days on the Streets | Channel 4 | 1 series; 3 episodes | |
| 2019 | Ed Stafford: Man Woman Child Wild | Discovery | Documentary | |
| 2019–present | Ed Stafford: First Man Out | Discovery | 3 series-present | |
| 2022 | 60 Days with the Gypsies | Channel 4 | Three-part series | |
| 2023 | 60 Days on the Estates | Channel 4 | Three-part series | |
| 2024 | Into the Jungle with Ed Stafford | Channel 4 | Six-part series | |
| 2025 | Ed Stafford's Rite Of Passage | Bilibili | 1 series; 12 episodes | |

== Publications ==
| Title | Release date | ISBN | Ref |
|---|---|---|---|
| Walking the Amazon | 7 June 2012 | 978-0753515648 | |
| Naked and Marooned | 5 June 2014 | 978-0753555040 | |
| Adventures for a Lifetime | 4 October 2018 | 978-0008306359 | |
| Ed Stafford's Ultimate Adventure Guide | 12 October 2018 | 978-0228101604 | |
| Expeditions Unpacked | 17 September 2019 | 978-1781318782 | |
| Epic Expeditions: 25 of the Greatest Voyages Into the Unknown | 3 August 2021 | 978-0711259645 | |
