= Asmat–Mombum languages =

Papuan language family

Asmat–Muli Strait
- Geographic distribution: Indonesia (New Guinea)
- Linguistic classification: Trans–New Guinea: Asmat–Muli Strait
- Subdivisions: Asmat–Kamrau; Muli Strait

Language codes
- ISO 639-3: –
- Glottolog: None
- Map: The Asmat-Muli Strait languages of New Guinea The Asmat–Kamrau Bay languages The Muli Strait languages Other Trans–New Guinea languages Other Papuan languages Austronesian languages Uninhabited

The Asmat–Muli Strait languages are a branch of the Trans–New Guinea languages spoken along the southern coast of Indonesian New Guinea, established by Timothy Usher and Edgar Suter.

Protoforms of basic vocabulary include *moi 'water', *iafVnV 'ear', *uase 'name', *awoɣ 'breast'.

== Subdivision ==
Asmat–Muli Strait consists of two primary subgroups:

- Asmat–Kamrau
- Muli Strait (or Mombum, Komolom)

== Proto-language ==
=== Phonology ===
Proto-Asmat–Muli Strait is reconstructed with 12 consonants and 5 vowels:

*m	*n		
*p	*t		*k
*(m)b	*(n)d		*(ŋ)g
	*s		
*w	*ɾ	*j	

Vowels are *a *e *i *o *u.

=== Basic vocabulary ===
Some lexical reconstructions by Usher (2020) are:

gloss	Proto-Asmat-Muli	Proto-Asmat-Kamrau	Proto-Muli Strait
head/hair	*gVɸV	*uɸu	*ɣo̝p, *ɣo̝w
ear	*iaɸVnV	*iaɸ[a/o]ne	*ie̝pær
nose/tip	*mVnVgV	*m[e/a]n[e]	*mæne̝ɣ
tooth/sharp	*sisV	*sisV	*-sir
blood	*[i/e]sV	*ese	*ir
breast	*awVgV	*awo	*abuɣ
louse	*amV	*amo	*am
dog	*iuwuɾi	*juwuɾi	*i[u]bui
pig	*[o/u]ɸV	*oɸo	*up
egg	*[o]k[a]	*oka	
sun	*jau[a]	*jawu	*zaua
water	*mVi	*moi	*mo̝i
name	*uase	*uwase	*ur
eat	*nV	*nV	*no̝ku
