= Ndom language =

Language in Indonesia

Ndom
- Native to: Indonesia
- Ethnicity: Kimaam
- Native speakers: 1,200 (2002)
- Language family: Trans–New Guinea: Kolopom; Ndom
- Writing system: Latin

Language codes
- ISO 639-3: nqm
- Glottolog: ndom1245

Ndom is a language spoken on Yos Sudarso Island in Papua province, Indonesia. It is reported to use a senary (base 6) numbering system, with a problem from the 2007 International Linguistics Olympiad focusing on it.
