= Kimaghama language =

Kolopom language spoken in Indonesia

Kimaghama
- Kimaama
- Native to: Indonesia
- Ethnicity: Kimaam
- Native speakers: (3,000 cited 1987)
- Language family: Trans–New Guinea: Kolopom; Kimaghama

Language codes
- ISO 639-3: kig
- Glottolog: kima1246

Kimaama, or Kimaghama, is a language spoken on Yos Sudarso Island in Papua province, Indonesia.

== Phonology ==
Consonants
		Labial	Alveolar	Retroflex	Palatal	Velar
Nasal		m	n			ŋ
Plosive	voiceless	p	t	ʈ	c	k
Plosive	voiced	b	d	ɖ	ɟ	ɡ
Plosive	prenasal	ᵐb	ⁿt ⁿd	ᶯʈ ᶯɖ	ᶮɟ	ᵑɡ
Fricative		β				ɣ
Trill			r			
Approximant		w			j	

Vowels
	Front	Central	Back
High	i		u
High-mid	e	ə	o
Low-mid	ɛ	ə	ɔ
Low		a	

== Grammar ==
Kimaghama has isolating morphology.
