= Muli Strait =

Strait in South Papua, Indonesia

- Selat Muli (Indonesian)
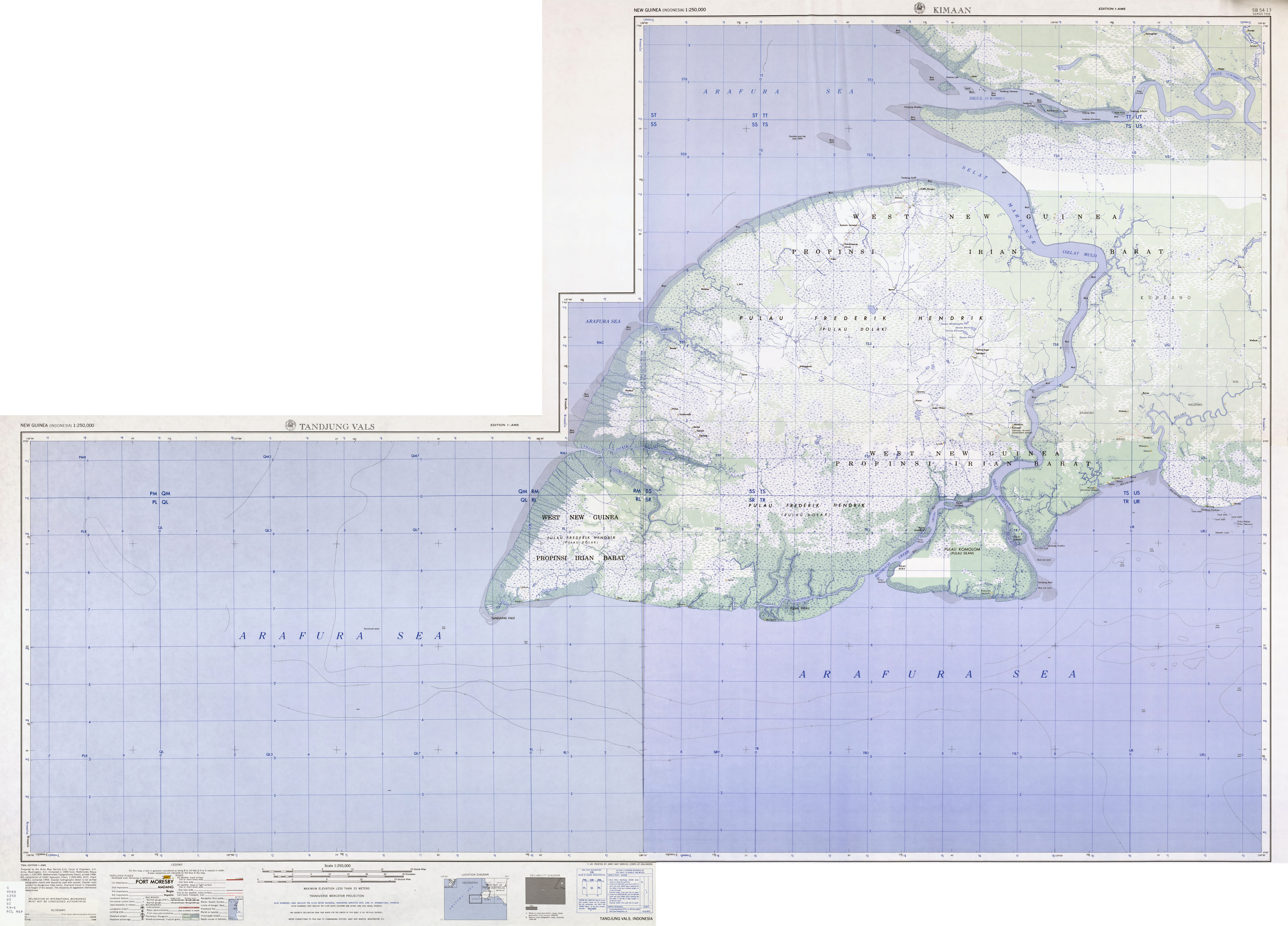
- Yos Sudarso Island and the Muli Strait

- Location within Western New Guinea
- Location: South Papua, Indonesia
- Coordinates: 7°49′23.23″S 139°0′43.74″E
- Type: strait
- Etymology: Princess Marianne of the Netherlands
- Basin countries: Indonesia

Muli Strait (Indonesian: Selat Muli, formerly Salat Moeli), also called the Marianne Strait (Dutch: Straat Marianne), is a narrow, winding strait in the Indonesian province of South Papua. It separates Yos Sudarso Island (formerly Frederik Hendrik Island) from the New Guinea mainland to the east.

The Dutch naval officer Dirk Hendrik Kolff charted the strait's north-western entrance in 1825–1826 and, taking it for a river, named it the Dourga River; its south-eastern entrance was charted as the St. Bartholomew River. The waterway was confirmed to be a strait in 1835, cutting off the south-western extremity of New Guinea, and was renamed after Princess Marianne of the Netherlands, a Dutch naval officer (Note: Sources differ on the officer involved in the 1835 passage. Kolff's account names Lieutenant Kaal as proving the waterway to be a strait, while the Encyclopaedie van Nederlandsch-Indië credits Lieutenant Langenberg Kool with renaming it.) having sailed through it on her birthday.

At the strait's southern end, Bensbach Creek separates Komoran Island from Yos Sudarso.

== See also ==
- Muli Strait languages
