= Olorua =

Island in Lau Islands, Fiji

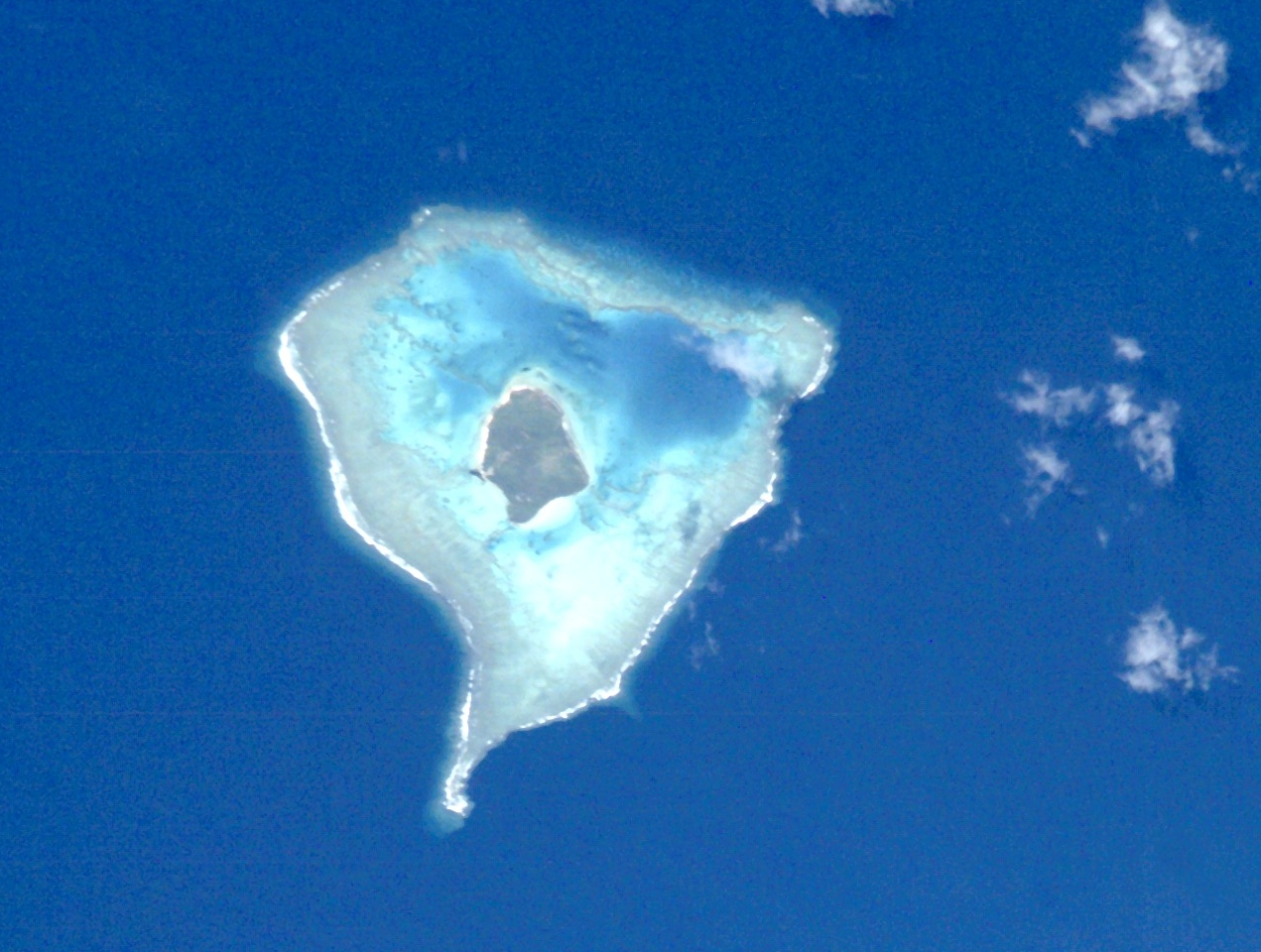
- Olorua Island

- Location within Fiji

Geography
- Location: South Pacific Ocean
- Coordinates: 18°36′19″S 178°45′15″W
- Archipelago: Southern Lau Islands
- Adjacent to: Koro Sea
- Area: 0.3 km^{2} (0.12 sq mi)
- Highest elevation: 50 m (160 ft)

Administration
- Fiji
- Division: Eastern
- Province: Lau
- Tikina: Kabara

Demographics
- Population: 0

Olorua is an uninhabited island of the Lau Archipelago in the Eastern Division of Fiji. The island has an area of 0.3 square kilometres (74 acres) and rises to 50 metres (164 ft) above sea level. It is located 8.0 nautical miles (14.8 km or 9.2 mi) northwest of Komo, the nearest inhabited island. It is occasionally visited by local tribes.

The island has a warm, tropical climate. Trees such as coconut, mango, lemon, grow on the island. Due to heavy marine pollution, its shores are littered with plastic bottles and other junk.

The wildlife on and around the island includes crabs, sharks, and lizards such as the gecko. There is also a small group of goats on the island, left by the people of the Komo clan of the largest neighbouring Island. The goats maintain their population on the island without human intervention. During festivities, a goat is captured and removed from the island during the night by shining a flashlight on it, causing it to freeze.

The island was featured on a Discovery Channel survival series, Marooned with Ed Stafford, in which a former British Army officer, Ed Stafford, spent 60 days alone on the island.

== See also ==
- Desert island
- List of islands
