= Louis-Philippe Loncke =

Belgian explorer, adventurer and motivational speaker

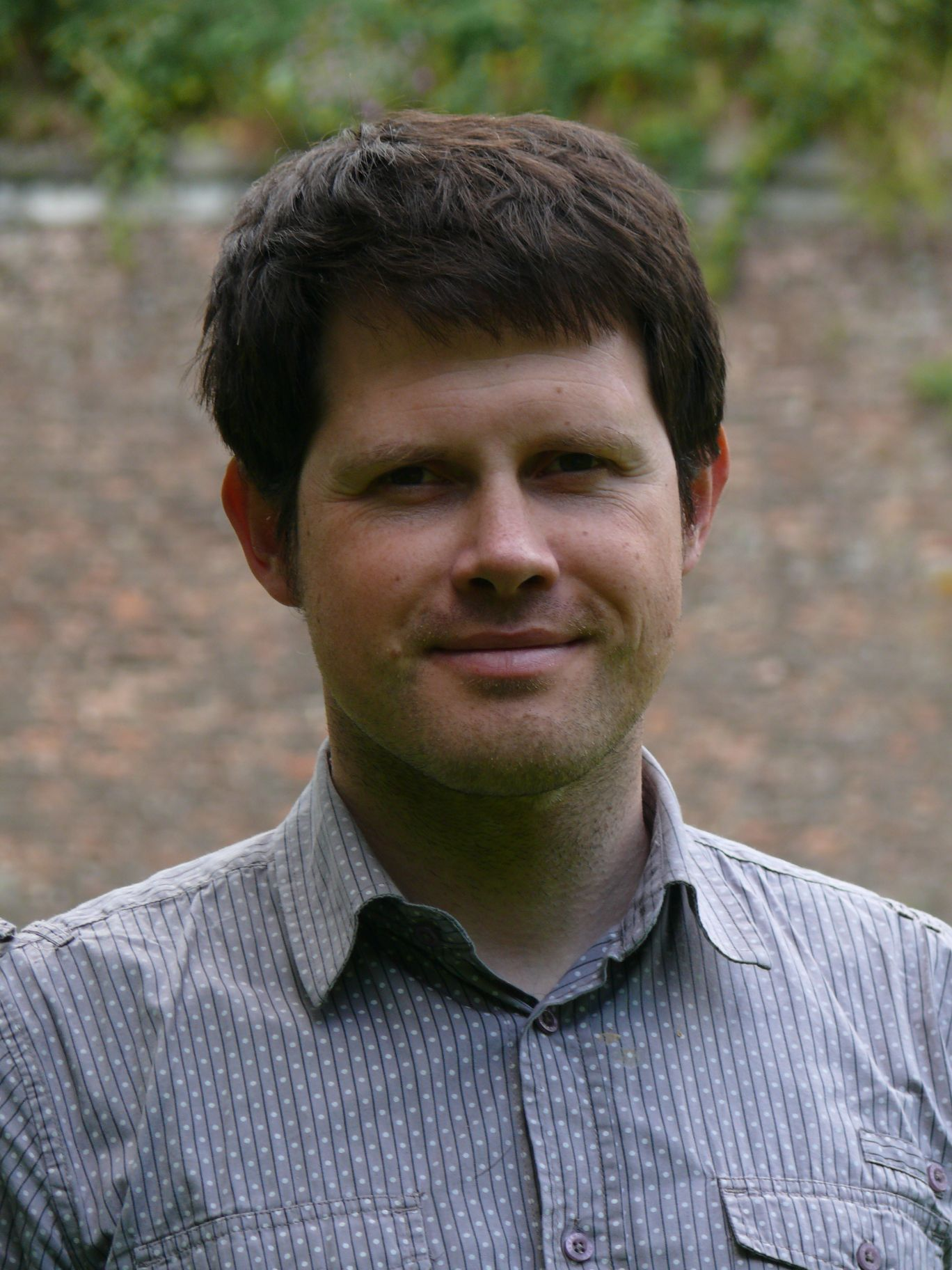
- Born: 3 March 1977 (age 49); Mouscron, Belgium
- Education: ECAM, KU Leuven, UAMS
- Occupations: Consultant, Explorer, Adventurer
- Years active: 2006–present

Louis-Philippe Loncke is a Belgian explorer, adventurer and motivational speaker. In 2008, he achieved the world first crossing on foot of the length of the Simpson Desert, which was a North to South traverse passing through its geographical center. In 2018, he traversed Tasmania during the austral winter without resupplies and was nicknamed the Mad Belgian by some Australians.

== Early life and education ==
Loncke was born in Mouscron, Belgium to a family of furniture makers. He studied engineering in Brussels at ECAM, a master in Industrial management in KU Leuven and treasury management at the University of Antwerp Management School.

== Career ==
=== Management consultant ===
Loncke started his career as logistics manager. Since 1999, he has built experience in over 10 corporate companies in various positions. He has been working as management consultant since 2007 mainly in IT. The skills he acquired in the corporate world allowed him to efficiently plan his expeditions. He is also self-taught in photography, SEO, marketing and communications. From 2006 to 2013, he was volunteering at NGO Art in All of Us and was elected member of the board of directors in 2010.

=== Adventurer and explorer ===
Loncke started traveling alone in 2000. In 2002, he was sent to Singapore for work and learned scuba diving. To fulfill this passion he traveled for a year in Oceania between 2004 and 2005. He started hiking and heard about adventurers and explorers; and became interested after seeing the world acclaimed film Alone across Australia. Back in Belgium, he met author and adventurer Sylvain Tesson who encouraged him to continue. Loncke left again in 2006 to Australia to start his first three expeditions.

His first solo unresupplied traverse of the Tasmanian Wilderness brought him the first sponsors and recognition among Australian explorers. After a year in Australia, he went back to Belgium and started planning for a series of several world first expeditions, the first being to attempt crossing the Simpson Desert at its longest distance.

He has organised charity expeditions involving media buzz including the highest chocolate tasting, on Everest. In July 2010, he trekked across Iceland between its extreme latitude from North to South. He spoofed an Icelandic promotional video that got viral in Iceland. He has announced a return to Iceland to attempt doing the journey during the winter. Both his Simpson and Iceland expeditions involved a science program of the MSH of Paris named Stress and decision taking in extreme environment.

== Expeditions ==
=== World firsts ===
- 2006 - Unsupported crossing of the West MacDonnell National Park
- 2006 - Unsupported traverse of Fraser Island
- 2007 - Unresupplied crossing of the Tasmanian Wilderness
- 2008 - Unsupported crossing of the Simpson Desert from North to South and passing through the center.
- 2010 - Unsupported traverse of Iceland in the Summer
- 2011 - BelgiKayak expedition, touring by kayak the Belgian waterways.
- 2012 : Crossing of Poland by human power from Mount Rysy across the Tatras Mountains by foot, then by kayak on the Vistula to the Baltic sea. He spoke about the expedition at TEDxWarsaw 2013.
- 2013 - TitiKayak expedition with Gadiel Sánchez Rivera. Full tour by kayak of lake Titicaca. Creation of the first geotagged photographic inventory of the lake: they took GPS coordinates of the location of the limit between the water and the ground and alongside photographs of the background. They also took underwater photos on the Northern Bolivian coast to locate the living habitat of the giant frog Telmatobius culeus. He told the purpose of the expedition at TEDxFlanders.
- 2015 - Unsupported traverse of Death Valley National Park from North to South
- 2016 - Salar trek 2. Unsupported traverse of Salar de Coipasa and Salar de Uyuni on foot. These two Salt flats are located in the Bolivian Altiplano and are the remains of Lake Tauca.
- 2018 - Tasmania Winter Trek. North to South traverse of Tasmania during the austral winter, without food or gas resupplies, without using roads and only sleeping in a tent.
- 2020 - HRP2020. Crossing the Pyrenees from the Atlantic Ocean to the Mediterranean Sea, without supplies, without assistance and sleeping only in a tent; and climbing the summit of Pico Aneto. Its route follows a variant of the Haute Randonnée Pyrénéenne
- 2021 - He walks and packrafts the entire Kungsleden trail unsupported, climbing underway also Skierfe and the Kebnekaise North and South summits.
- 2023 - GTA2023. Crossing the French Alps from the Mediterranean Sea to Lake Geneva, without resupply, using water from only public sources, without assistance and sleeping only in a tent. He followed the GTA or Grande Traversée des Alpes from Nice to Thonon-les-Bains.

=== Charity and cultural expeditions ===
- 2009 - Chocolate Sherpa expedition, walking 400 km from Kathmandu to Everest Base Camp and back to Lukla distributing chocolate.

=== Scientific and other expeditions ===
- 2013 - Cordell expedition to Clipperton Island. Scientific and DXpedition with callsign TX5K.
- 2013 - Marañón River expedition. Joined for 6 days the 1 month rafting and kayaking of the upper part of the river
- 2013 - Salar trek expedition. He attempted, but failed, to traverse Salar de Coipasa and Salar de Uyuni on foot without any resupply.
- 2016 - Unsupported partial crossing of the Simpson Desert from West to East from Old Andado to Poeppel Corner and passing through the center.
- 2024 - Failed attempt at a double crossing of the Simpson Desert of over 1000km. Abandoned due to a slight injury and the weight of the cart being too heavy.

== Challenges ==
- 2020 - The Everest Bueren Challenge, climbing up and down the stairs of the Montagne de Bueren 135 times with a 15 kg backpack.
- 2021 - Confined in my Tent, living 1 week on a 5m² platform hanging 10m above the ground.
- 2022 - Unsupported speed record on the GR 70 Stevenson hiking trail.

== Films ==
From 2021, he started to produce films about his expeditions and challenges. The films are released online or screened at festivals.

- 2021 - The Mad Belgian: Keep walking
- 2022 - The Mad Belgian: Confined in My Tent

== Awards and recognition ==
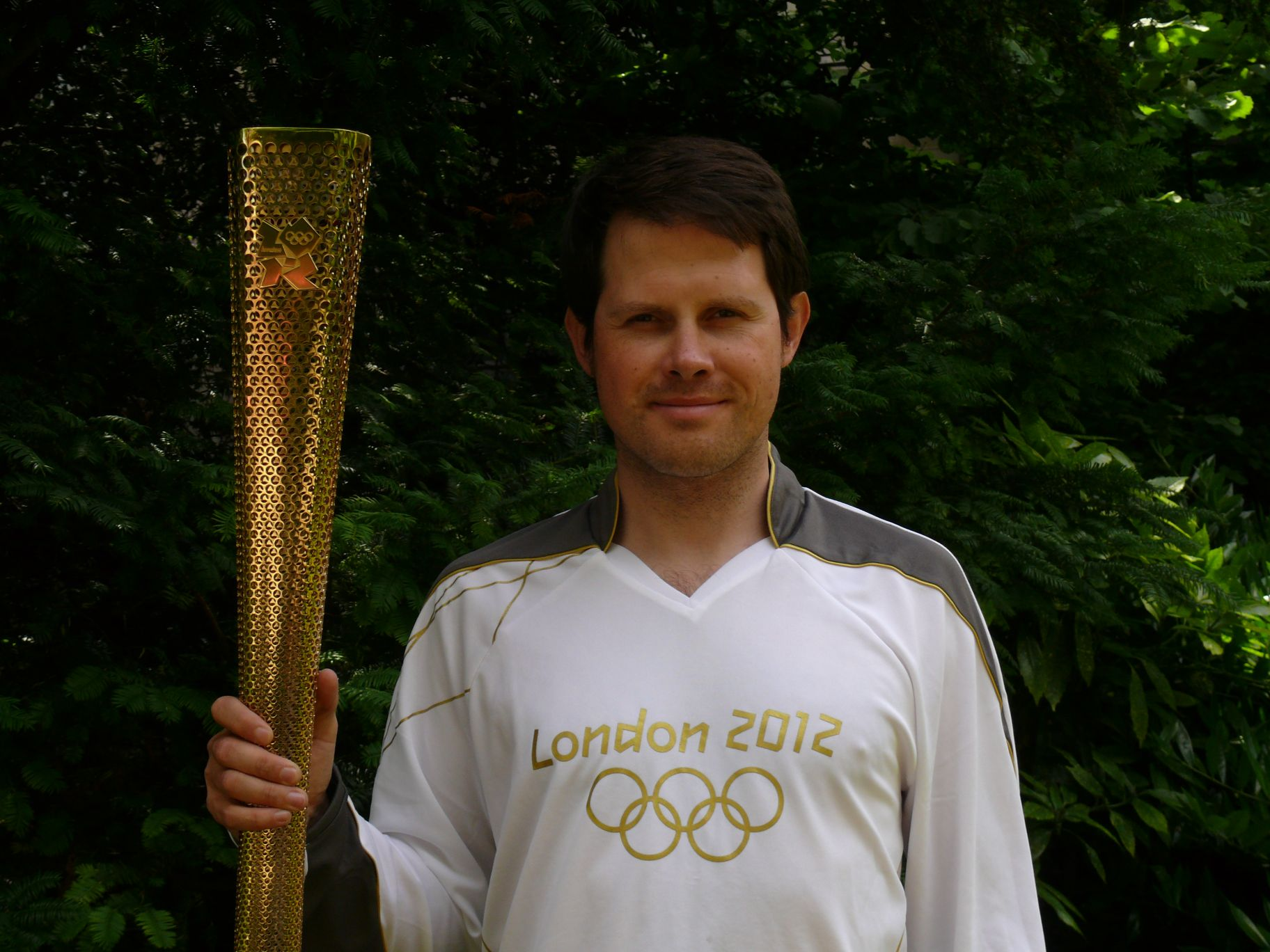
Louis-Philippe Loncke holding the olympic torch

- In 2009, he was awarded young talent of the year by the Baillis of Mouscron.
- Outer Edge magazine has selected in its February–March 2011 issue Loncke's Simpson desert crossing being in the top 10 Australian expeditions to the edge of reason.
- Accepted as member of the Explorers Club in 2010 and elected to Fellow in 2014.
- Becoming Fellow of the Royal Geographical Society in 2011
- In September 2011, the Jane Goodall Institute Belgium nominates him as goodwill ambassador for the Roots & Shoots program.
- Selected by the LOCOG to carry the Olympic Flame through Choppington on 15 June 2012.
- Finalist Photoshoot Awards contest OCEAN 2013, category Pollution.
- At the European parliament in Brussels, on 7 May 2014, Jane Goodall made him Jane Goodall Institute Knight for Youth, Animals and Plants in the Order of the Iguana.
- A the ISPO fair in Munich, he is awarded European Adventurer of the Year 2016.
- He is enthroned Honorary Bailli of Mouscron in October 2017
- Ranked #3 of the Top 10 expeditions of 2018 according to ExplorersWeb
- Early 2026, he was admitted to the Société des explorateurs français.
