= Marooned with Ed Stafford =

- Also known as: Ed Stafford: Naked and Marooned (series 1); Naked Castaway (U.S. title)
- Genre: Documentary
- Presented by: Ed Stafford
- Narrated by: Ed Stafford
- Country of origin: United Kingdom
- Original language: English
- No. of series: 4
- No. of episodes: 25

Production
- Running time: 60 minutes
- Production company: Tigress Productions

Original release
- Network: Discovery Channel
- Release: 10 March 2013 – 27 February 2025

Marooned with Ed Stafford is a documentary television series commissioned by Discovery Channel and produced by Tigress Productions, part of the Endemol Shine Group. Ed Stafford films the series, in which he journeys to remote destinations around the world for ten days each to see if he can survive there on his own in solitude with no clothes (first series only), no food, and no tools. He can only take his camera, an emergency satellite phone and an emergency medical kit. Stafford's goal is to see if he can not only survive, but thrive under these tough conditions.

The first series, Ed Stafford: Naked and Marooned, sees Stafford spend sixty days on the uninhabited tropical island of Olorua in the Pacific Ocean.

During 2024, Ed made references on his Instagram accounts of a new series, which was filmed during 2024 and was targeted for release on Discovery Channel for 2025. (This was later confirmed on social media, with the first new Episode of Series 4 being aired on 23 January 2025, at 9pm GMT).

== Episodes ==
=== Series overview ===
Series	Episodes	Originally released	
Series	Episodes	First released	Last released
1	4	10 March 2013	28 March 2013
2	9	23 April 2014	23 October 2014
3	6	8 May 2016	15 August 2016
4	6	23 January 2025	27 February 2025

=== Series 1 (2013) ===
No. overall	No. in series	Title	Original release date
1	1	"Stranded"	10 March 2013
Explorer Ed Stafford struggles to establish himself on a remote uninhabited Fijian island. Arriving with nothing, he has to quickly establish his priorities of water, shelter, food and fire to have any chance of surviving his 60-day challenge. Living mainly on coconuts, Ed frantically searches the island for a reliable water source and for food, eating anything that comes his way - including a raw gecko. As his only water source dries up, Ed suffers from dehydration before the rain comes and gives him the boost he needs to finally make a much-needed fire.
2	2	"Give Me Shelter"	21 March 2013
It’s been two weeks since Ed Stafford arrived on the uninhabited Fijian island of Olorua, with absolutely nothing except cameras to record his experience. With the rainy season approaching, he desperately needs to move out of his exposed caveman home and build a shelter inland. With nothing but a clamshell to fell trees, it’s physically exhausting. To make matters worse, he’s still constantly hungry and dehydrated. As Ed’s physical health deteriorates, so does his mental state, and loneliness begins to take its toll. He’s forced to dig deep to find the strength to keep going.
3	3	"Swimming With Sharks"	28 March 2013
Finally, Ed is beginning to master the island and is living almost comfortably. But he's still got two challenges: to kill and eat a feral goat, and to build a raft and enter the shark-infested waters to catch fish.
4	4	"Ed Bares All"	6 September 2013
Behind the scenes from Ed's 60 days on the island.

=== Series 2 (2014) ===
No. overall	No. in series	Title	Original release date
5	1	"Botswana"	23 April 2014
Ed Stafford has to survive 10 days in the dangerous Okavango Delta in Botswana.
6	2	"Venezuela"	30 April 2014
Ed is marooned in the rainforest surroundings of Venezuela.
7	3	"Australia"	7 May 2014
Ed is marooned on the unforgiving coast of Western Australia.
8	4	"Romania"	14 May 2014
Ed is stranded in the Carpathian Mountains.
9	5	"Borneo"	21 May 2014
Ed Stafford takes on the jungles of Borneo.
10	6	"Thailand"	9 October 2014
Ed Stafford is marooned for 10 days with nothing in a mountainous area of the Golden Triangle. It’s the tail end of the monsoon and Ed is caught out, leaving himself exposed and vulnerable. Keen not to make the same mistake again he uses all his skill and ingenuity to tap into the resources the jungle has to offer.
11	7	"Rwanda"	16 October 2014
Ed Stafford is marooned for 10 days with nothing, on the African savannah in Rwanda. Dropped at 2000 metres on the high grasslands of Central Africa, Ed finds himself in a bid to live in harmony with Africa's biggest game. Surrounded by antelope, warthogs, elephant and giraffe, the grasslands are a harsh environment to thrive in, and food is scarce.
12	8	"Arizona"	23 October 2014
Under the searing summer sun, Ed takes on Arizona's Sonoran Desert. As temperatures exceed 40 °C, and the local monsoon season threatens to bring potentially deadly flash floods, he battles against the threat of rattlesnakes and mountain lions in a bid to tread in the footsteps of ancient indigenous Americans who thrived in this harsh habitat.
13	9	"Rules of Survival"	30 October 2014

=== Series 3 (2016) ===
No. overall	No. in series	Title	Original release date
14	1	"The Gobi Desert"	8 May 2016
Dropped in to the middle of Mongolia's Gobi Desert, Ed tackles his most isolated challenge ever. Thousands of miles from civilisation, and facing the constant threats of searing heat and dehydration, Ed finds refuge in a desert oasis. Home to elusive desert bears, the oasis provides Ed with a source of water, edible plants and a base to make a rock and wood house. After a meagre start, he eventually catches some supper.
15	2	"Guatemala"	15 May 2016
This time Ed must survive in the jungles of Guatemala. Dropped off on a small island in the Usumacinta River, Ed has to brave crocodiles to reach the jungle. Once there, he is swiftly reminded how tough it is to survive in a rainforest. Battling through dense foliage, he discovers a beautiful lake and sets up camp. But as it's the rainy season, he struggles to make a fire and can't catch anything to eat. Desperately hungry, he builds a raft and sets out onto the lake to fish, ever aware of the resident crocodiles. After nine days alone in the wild, Ed realises that he should make a dramatic offering in thanks for his survival.
16	3	"Namibia"	22 May 2016
Ed takes on the parched bushveld of northern Namibia, in southern Africa. Dropped right at the end of a very long dry season, there are virtually no edible plants available to him. Undeterred, he makes base camp up a tree on the shores of a huge lake, spending each night on his home-made sleeping platform. He builds a huge fish corral which gives him a steady supply of small fish to eat, alongside a bird that he catches in a traditional bushman’s trap. But his obsession with trying to catch a warthog sees him take his eye off the ball. How will he survive?
17	4	"Patagonia"	1 August 2016
Dropped deep in the foothills of the Andes, in Argentine Patagonia, Ed faces extreme exposure to both intense sunlight and freezing temperatures as the Southern Hemisphere unleashes a torrent of meteorological abuse. Making camp in a mountain river valley, he subsists on a diet of wild woodland salad, tadpoles and ant eggs before getting to grips with tickling trout in the fish-rich waters. In a final demonstration of thriving, he builds an automated fishing system and creates a living larder to keep his food source alive in preparation for a last evening mega-meal.
18	5	"Philippines"	8 August 2016
Ed is in The Philippines, on Coron Island, attempting to survive on a secluded beach. The seashore is covered in litter, potentially useful for survival but a depressing reminder of the state of our seas. Ed hasn’t been abandoned on an island since his ordeals on Naked and Marooned and, when he gets seriously ill, he starts to struggle with ghosts from the past. Lying on his sick bed of palm leaves, Ed realises that if he doesn’t push himself to find water and food quickly then his survival mission is over. Hemmed in by towering granite cliffs, he’s concerned there may be no fresh water to be found.
19	6	"Norway"	15 August 2016
Ed heads for the Arctic Circle, and is dropped on top of a snow-covered mountain in the western fjords of Norway. This is the first time Marooned has ever been to a truly cold location. The conditions are so extreme that Ed is compelled to wear clothes, but as usual takes no food, tools or knife. Before entering isolation, Ed undergoes special ice training to prepare him for the dangers that lie ahead. He faces a new set of challenges, including having to build a shelter that will protect him from the inhospitable weather and keep his fire alight on the sodden ground. He’s under constant risk of hypothermia, and the rising spring tide threatens his home.

=== Series 4 (2025) ===
No. overall	No. in series	Title	Original release date
20	1	"Orinoco River"	23 January 2025
Encircled by raging forest fires, Ed Stafford struggles to survive in the arid savannah and dense jungles along Columbia's Orinoco River.
21	2	"Changbai Mountain"	30 January 2025
Stuck in nearly two metres of snow, Ed must work out how to survive long enough in sub-zero temperatures to make his way off the peak of Changbai Mountain in Northern China.
22	3	"Erongo Mountains"	6 February 2025
In Namibia's Erongo Mountains: hundreds of kilometres of scorching, rocky desert, but the San bushmen have survived here for millennia. Can Ed?
23	4	"GuangXi Karst"	13 February 2025
Barefoot among the karst spires of Guangxi China, Ed must learn to navigate the razor-sharp rocks and deadly snakes in this scarce environment.
24	5	"Pearl Islands"	20 February 2025
Isolated on a desert island off of the coast of Panama, Ed is trapped on a beach unless he braves the shark infested waters to find a new base.
25	6	"Caprivi Strip The Kwando River"	27 February 2025
Ed strives to survive for 10 days in the heart of Africa, the Caprivi, a place with the highest concentration of dangerous game in the world.

== Broadcast ==
- In the United Kingdom, the series airs first on Discovery Channel, with reruns airing on DMAX.
- The series airs on Discovery Channel in the United States as Naked Castaway.
- In Italy, the series airs on DMAX with a different episodes timeline as Ed Stafford: Duro a morire (Italian for "Ed Stafford: Die-Hard").
- In Germany, the series airs on DMAX with a different episodes timeline as Ed Stafford: Das nackte Überleben (German for "Ed Stafford: Naked Survival").
