= Walking the Amazon =

Walking expedition by Ed Stafford

Walking the Amazon was an expedition conceived and successfully completed by British explorer Ed Stafford. It was the first recorded time anyone had journeyed the entire length of the Amazon River from source to sea on foot and was recognised as an official Guinness World Record. Walking the Amazon is also a book of the expedition by Stafford originally published by Virgin Books in the UK. Self-filmed footage from the 860-day journey was also made into a Discovery Channel two-part television documentary.

== Overview ==
On 2 April 2008 Ed Stafford and Luke Collyer set out from Camana, Peru on the Pacific Coast in search of the furthest source of the Amazon which is acknowledged to be on the north face of Nevado Mismi. From there the pair followed the course of the river with the intent of reaching the Atlantic Ocean within one year. Collyer departed from the expedition after three months due to growing differences between the two men. Stafford continued alone and recruited Gadiel "Cho" Sánchez Rivera in August 2008 in the Red Zone. The new pairing fared better and, although Sanchez Rivera only originally committed to walking for five days, he decided not to return home and the two men, Stafford and Sanchez Rivera, walked for a further two years before reaching the mouth of the Amazon River on 9 August 2010. Walking the Amazon is acknowledged to be the longest jungle trek in history.

== Acclaim ==
Stafford's accomplishment of walking the length of the Amazon river has been described by Sir Ranulph Fiennes as being "truly extraordinary...in the top league of expeditions past and present".

In 2011 Guinness World Records formally recognised Stafford's achievement and he appears in the 2012 Guinness Book of Records.
