= Kolopom languages =

Language family in Indonesia

Kolopom
- Geographic distribution: Kolepom Island, South Papua
- Linguistic classification: Trans–New Guinea: Kayagar–Kolopom; Kolopom

Language codes
- Glottolog: kolo1268
- Map: The Kolopom languages of New Guinea The Kolopom languages Other Trans–New Guinea languages Other Papuan languages Austronesian languages Uninhabited

The Kolopom languages are a family of Trans–New Guinea languages in the classifications of Stephen Wurm (1975) and of Malcolm Ross (2005). Along with the Mombum languages, they are the languages spoken on Kolepom Island (Yos Sudarso Island) in South Papua, Indonesia.

== Languages ==
The Kolopom languages are:

- Central Kolopom: Kimaama (Kimaghama), Riantana
- Ndom
- Moraori

== Proto-language ==
=== Phonemes ===
Usher (2020) reconstructs the consonant inventory as follows:

*m	*n		
*p	*t	*s	*k
*mb	*nd	*ndz	*ŋg
[*w]	[*r]	[*j]	[*ɣ]

*i		*u
*e	*ɵ	*o
*æ	*a	

=== Pronouns ===
Usher (2020) reconstructs the pronouns as:

	sg	pl
1	*n[a/o]	*nie
2	*K[a/o] (?)	*ŋgie
3	*ep	*emDe

=== Basic vocabulary ===
Some lexical reconstructions by Usher (2020) are:

gloss	Proto-Kolopom
head	*tipV; *mVrV[w]
hair/feathers	*muen[a]
ear/mind	? *mVrVk; *[ndz][o/u]an
eye	*VnV
nose	*ŋgon
tooth	*t[e]r[a]k
tongue	*mepreŋg
blood	*iendz
breast/milk	*mam
louse	*nemeŋg
dog	*n[ia]
pig	*k[o/u][a]
egg	*uak
tree/wood	*nd[ua]t
man/person	*ndz[ia]p
woman/wife	*jowa[k]
moon	*kumbanV
water	*ndzu
stone	*mete
name	*n[e/a][k/ŋg]
two	*[j]enapa; *sVp

== Cognates ==
Cognates among Kolopom languages listed by Evans (2018):

Kolopom family cognates
gloss	Kimaghama	Riantana	Ndom	Marori
stone	mɛtɛ	mɛtoe	mɛtə	mɛrɛ / mara
cheek	cama	cəma	–	sama
name	nɛ	na	nar	neɣ / naw
rope	niɛ	na	nɛɣ	naʒ

== Vocabulary comparison ==
The following basic vocabulary words are from McElhanon & Voorhoeve (1970) and Voorhoeve (1975), as cited in the Trans-New Guinea database:

The words cited constitute translation equivalents, whether they are cognate (e.g. mete, meːt, metö for "stone") or not (e.g. tuakwo, reːt, modo for "head").

gloss	Kimaghima	Ndom	Riantana
head	tuakwo	reːt	modo
hair	muna	tomwen	rutivö
eye	avuo	ununor	anömbö
tooth	travae	trex	tudömbo
leg	kura	tur	teː
louse	nöme	neːmön	nöme
dog	nöe	wawant	nia
pig	ku	yar	ku
bird	axanemö	nembörfe	ne
egg	wo	wax	winömbana
blood	dörö	eth	yerana
bone	duno	in	nduka
skin	krara	krikir	kwika
tree	do	ndör; ndua	ndör; ndua
man	ci	xarefe theref	rianoana
sun	öre	wen	meːnoŋwa
water	cu	wer	rö
fire	i	u	drö
stone	mete	meːt	metö
name	ne	nar	ria
eat	muye	xot	mora
one	növere	sas	meːbö
two	kave	thef	enava

== Evolution ==
Kolopom reflexes of proto-Trans-New Guinea (pTNG) etyma are:

Kimaghana language:

- kura 'leg' < *k(a,o)ndok[V]
- nome 'louse' < *niman
- nanu 'older sibling' < *nana(i)

Riantana language:

- mu 'breast' < *amu
- modo 'head' < *mVtVna
- nome 'louse' < *niman
