= Laura Bingham =

English explorer

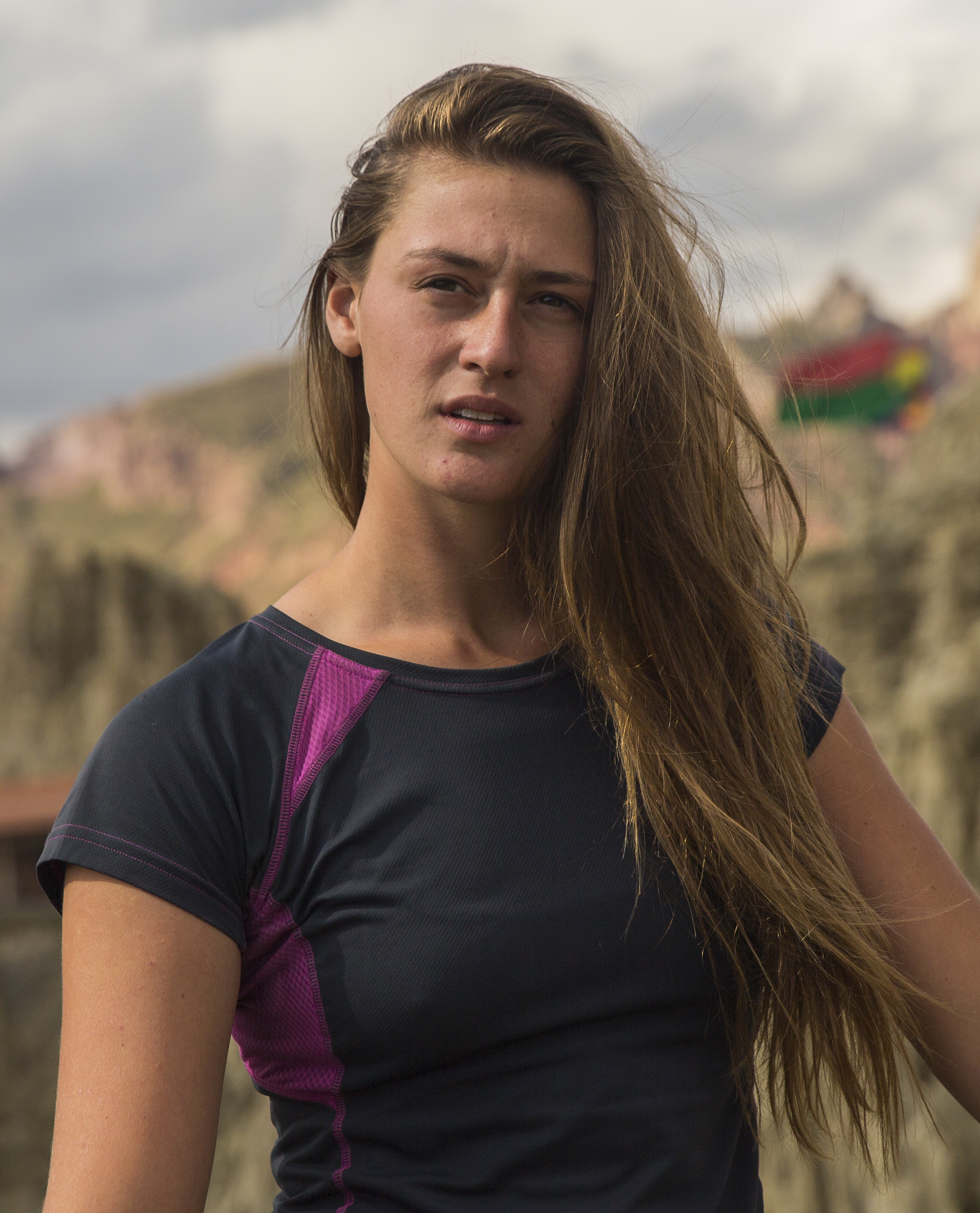
- Bingham in 2016
- Born: 1993 (age 32–33); England
- Occupation: Explorer
- Spouse: Ed Stafford (m. 2016)
- Children: 4

Laura Bingham (a.k.a. Laura Stafford) (born 1993), is an English explorer and adventurer best known for leading the world first descent of the Essequibo River in Guyana, South America. She appeared on the cover of British Airways High Life magazine in 2017 alongside Sir Ranulph Fiennes, Ed Stafford, and Tim Peake, and was referred to as "The Adventurer".

== Biography ==
Laura Bingham was born and brought up in the English countryside and is the youngest of four sisters. While growing up, the family often visited South Africa, and Bingham attended a South African school for a short term. She attended Westgate secondary school and then Peter Symonds College in Winchester, her home town. She left home at the age of 18 to travel.

In 2014 Bingham traveled to Mexico where she taught English with her TEFL qualification. Whilst in Mexico she also became involved with jaguar conservation work with the government. Throughout these four months, Bingham learned Spanish to an intermediate level.

Having then earned enough money to return to Britain, in May 2014 Bingham opted out of flying home and instead chose to sail the Atlantic as part of a crew (two men and a cat called Cuba) for a 38 ft Trimaran which took 2 months.

In January 2016, Bingham cycled from the west coast of South America to the east coast, 7,000 kilometres, fundraising for Operation South Africa.

In April 2018, Bingham organised and led a descent of the Essequibo River in Guyana. She is an ambassador for the Children's Air Ambulance charity.

== Personal life ==
Bingham lived in Leicestershire, England with her husband and fellow explorer, Ed Stafford. In April 2023 the couple moved to Costa Rica. They have four children.
