= Riantana language =

Language in Indonesia

Riantana
- Kimaam
- Ndom-bana
- Native to: Indonesia
- Ethnicity: Kimaam
- Native speakers: (1,100 cited 1977)
- Language family: Trans–New Guinea: Kolopom; Riantana

Language codes
- ISO 639-3: ran
- Glottolog: rian1263

Riantana, or Kimaam, is a language spoken by the Kimaam people on Yos Sudarso Island in South Papua, Indonesia.

== Phonology ==
Riantana phonemic inventory:

Consonants
		Bilabial	Dental	Alveolar	Retroflex	Palatal	Velar
Nasal		m		n			ŋ
Plosive	voiceless	p		t	ʈ	c	k
Plosive	voiced	b	d̪	d		ɟ	ɡ
Plosive	prenasal	ᵐb	ⁿd̪	ⁿd		ᶮɟ	ᵑɡ
Fricative		β					ɣ
Trill				r			
Glide		w				j	

Vowels
	Front	Central	Back
Close	i		u
Close-mid		ə	o
Open-mid	ɛ	ə	ɔ
Open		a	
