= Mombum language =

Trans–New Guinea language spoken in Indonesia

Mombum
- Native to: West New Guinea
- Region: Yos Sudarso Island
- Native speakers: (250 cited 1993)
- Language family: Trans–New Guinea: Central & South New Guinea ?; Mombum; Mombum

Language codes
- ISO 639-3: mso
- Glottolog: nucl1452
- ELP: Mombum

Mombum, or Kemelom (Komolom), is a Trans–New Guinea language spoken on Yos Sudarso Island (Kolopom Island) in West New Guinea.

== Phonology ==
Mombum phonemic inventory:

Consonants
b, ᵐb, d, ⁿd, ⁿʤ, ɡ, t, k, f, s, z, ʃ, ɣ, m, n, ŋ, r, l, w, z, j

Vowels
a, e, ɛ, i, o, u, ʏ
