= Kimaam, Merauke =

District in South Papua, Indonesia

Kimaam
- Location in South Papua Location in Indonesian Papua
- Coordinates: 7.985°S 138.847°E
- Country: Indonesia
- Province: South Papua
- Regency: Merauke Regency
- Elevation: 49 ft (15 m)

Population (2010)
  - Total: 5,605
- Time zone: UTC+9 (Indonesia Eastern Standard Time)

Kimaam is a district in Merauke Regency in South Papua province, Indonesia. Its population is 5605 in 2010. It is mainly located on Yos Sudarso Island.

== Administrative territory ==
Kimaam District is the main settlement in Yos Sudarso Island and is divided into thirteen villages, although the proper continuous settlement only consists of five villages (listed in italic).

- Deka
- Kalilam
- Kimaam
- Kiworo
- Komolom
- Kumbis
- Mambum
- Purawanderu
- Teri
- Turiram
- Umanderu
- Webu
- Woner

== Climate ==
Kimaam has a tropical monsoon climate (Am) with moderate to little rainfall from June to October and heavy rainfall from November to May.

Climate data for Kimaam
Month	Jan	Feb	Mar	Apr	May	Jun	Jul	Aug	Sep	Oct	Nov	Dec	Year
Mean daily maximum °C (°F)	31.2 (88.2)	30.9 (87.6)	31.0 (87.8)	31.1 (88.0)	30.5 (86.9)	29.3 (84.7)	28.7 (83.7)	29.1 (84.4)	30.3 (86.5)	31.2 (88.2)	31.9 (89.4)	31.7 (89.1)	30.6 (87.0)
Daily mean °C (°F)	27.2 (81.0)	26.9 (80.4)	27.0 (80.6)	27.0 (80.6)	26.6 (79.9)	25.4 (77.7)	25.0 (77.0)	25.0 (77.0)	25.7 (78.3)	26.6 (79.9)	27.2 (81.0)	27.4 (81.3)	26.4 (79.6)
Mean daily minimum °C (°F)	23.2 (73.8)	23.0 (73.4)	23.1 (73.6)	23.0 (73.4)	22.7 (72.9)	21.6 (70.9)	21.3 (70.3)	20.9 (69.6)	21.1 (70.0)	22.0 (71.6)	22.6 (72.7)	23.2 (73.8)	22.3 (72.2)
Average precipitation mm (inches)	295 (11.6)	249 (9.8)	300 (11.8)	229 (9.0)	171 (6.7)	86 (3.4)	82 (3.2)	51 (2.0)	55 (2.2)	91 (3.6)	148 (5.8)	231 (9.1)	1,988 (78.2)
Source: Climate-Data.org
