= Yos Sudarso Island =

Island in South Papua, Indonesia

Kolepom Yos Sudarso, Dolok, Kimaam
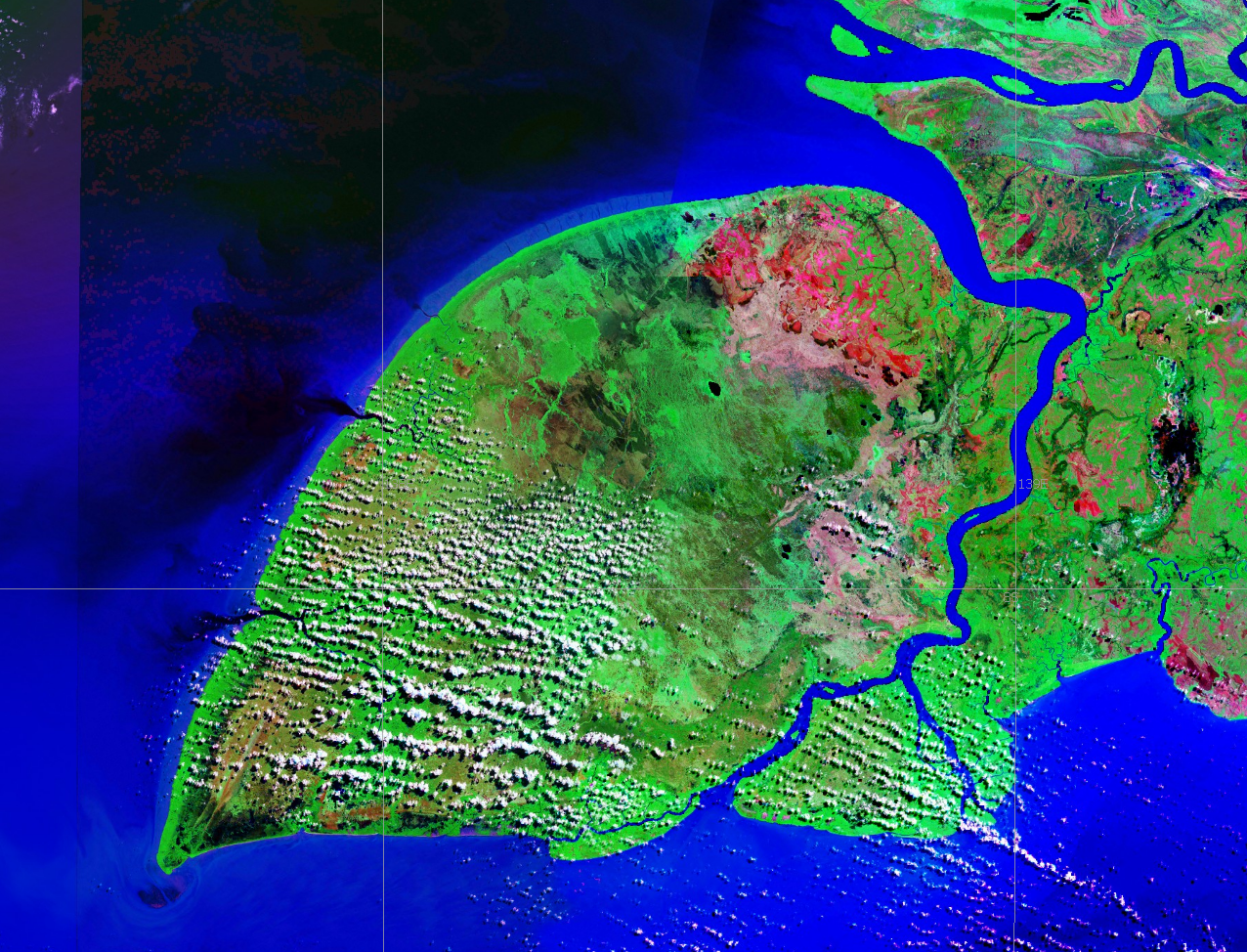
- NASA satellite image.

- Location within South Papua

Geography
- Location: South East Asia
- Coordinates: 7°57′S 138°24′E
- Area: 11,742 km^{2} (4,534 sq mi)
- Area rank: 67th

Administration
- Indonesia
- Province: South Papua
- Largest settlement: Kimaam, Merauke

Demographics
- Population: 11,000

Kolepom Island or Pulau Yos Sudarso is an island separated by the narrow Muli Strait from the main island of New Guinea. It is part of the Merauke Regency, in the Indonesian province of South Papua. The island is leaf-shaped, about 165 km (103 mi) long with an area of 11,740 km^{2} (4,530 sq mi). It was known as Frederik Hendrik Island until 1963. Local and alternative names of the island include Dolok and Kimaam. This is the 11th largest island in Indonesia.

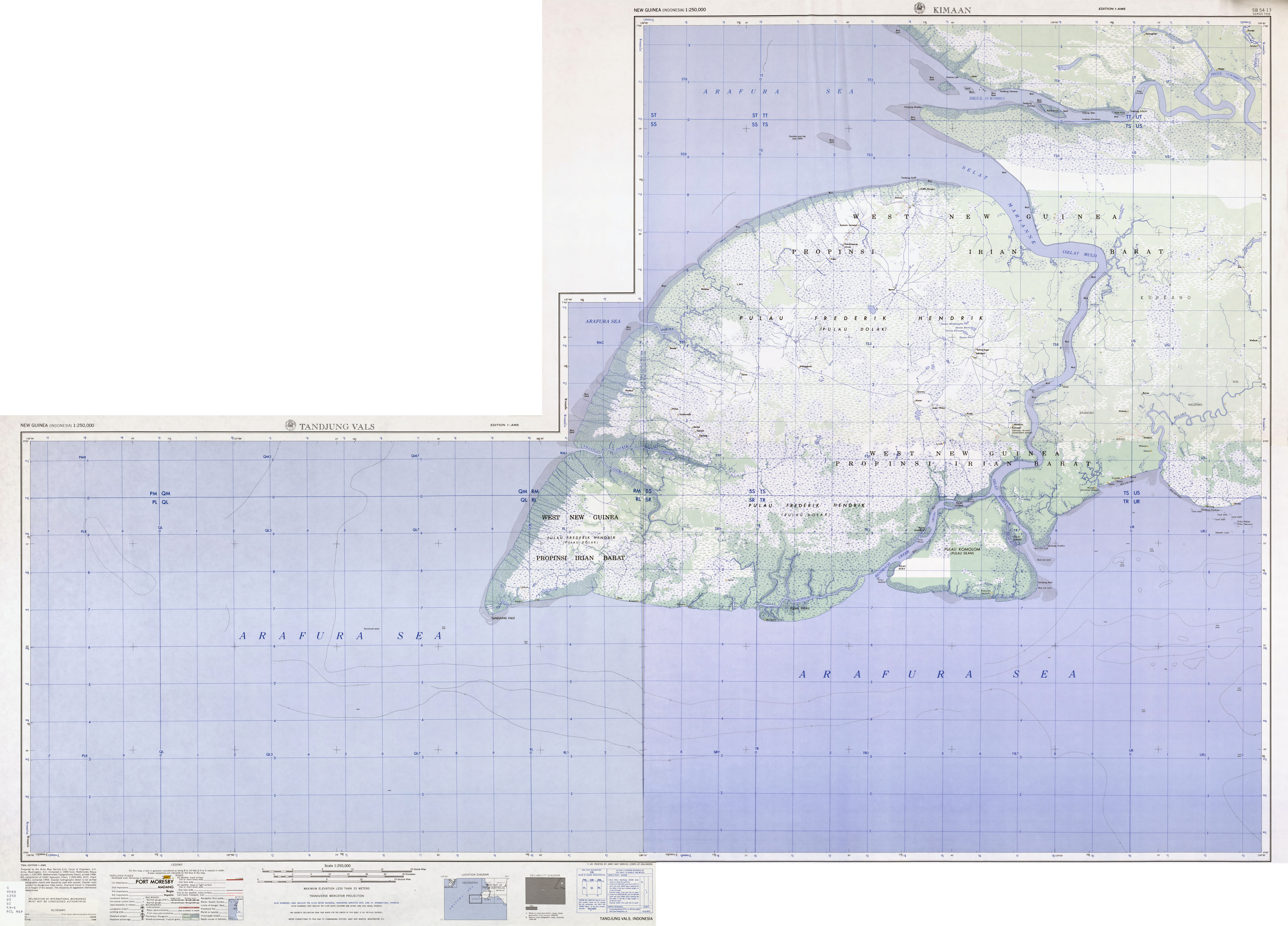
1:250,000 map

With about 11,000 inhabitants, the island's population density is less than 1 per square kilometre (2.5/sq mi). The native population speaks Kolopom languages, including Kimaghima, Ndom, and Riantana/Kimaan. Communities on the island include Kaba, Kimaan, Kladar, Pembre, Wan, and Yomuka. Kimaan (or Kimaam) is the main settlement. It lies in the southeast on the Buaya Strait that separates the smaller island of Komoran from Dolak.

== History ==
The island was first sighted by Europeans in about January 1606 when Willem Jansz and his crew on the ship Duyfken rounded it on their way to and returning from their discovery of Australia. Duyfken spent considerable time in the bight in between the island and the mainland. Jansz's map of the expedition describes the island as lowland and muddy land and with the name "Tiuri". When rounding the prominent southwest cape, jutting into the Arafura Sea, in 1623, Jan Carstensz named it Valse Kaap (Dutch for "False Cape"), a name retained to date (Indonesian Tanjung Vals, English "Cape Vals").

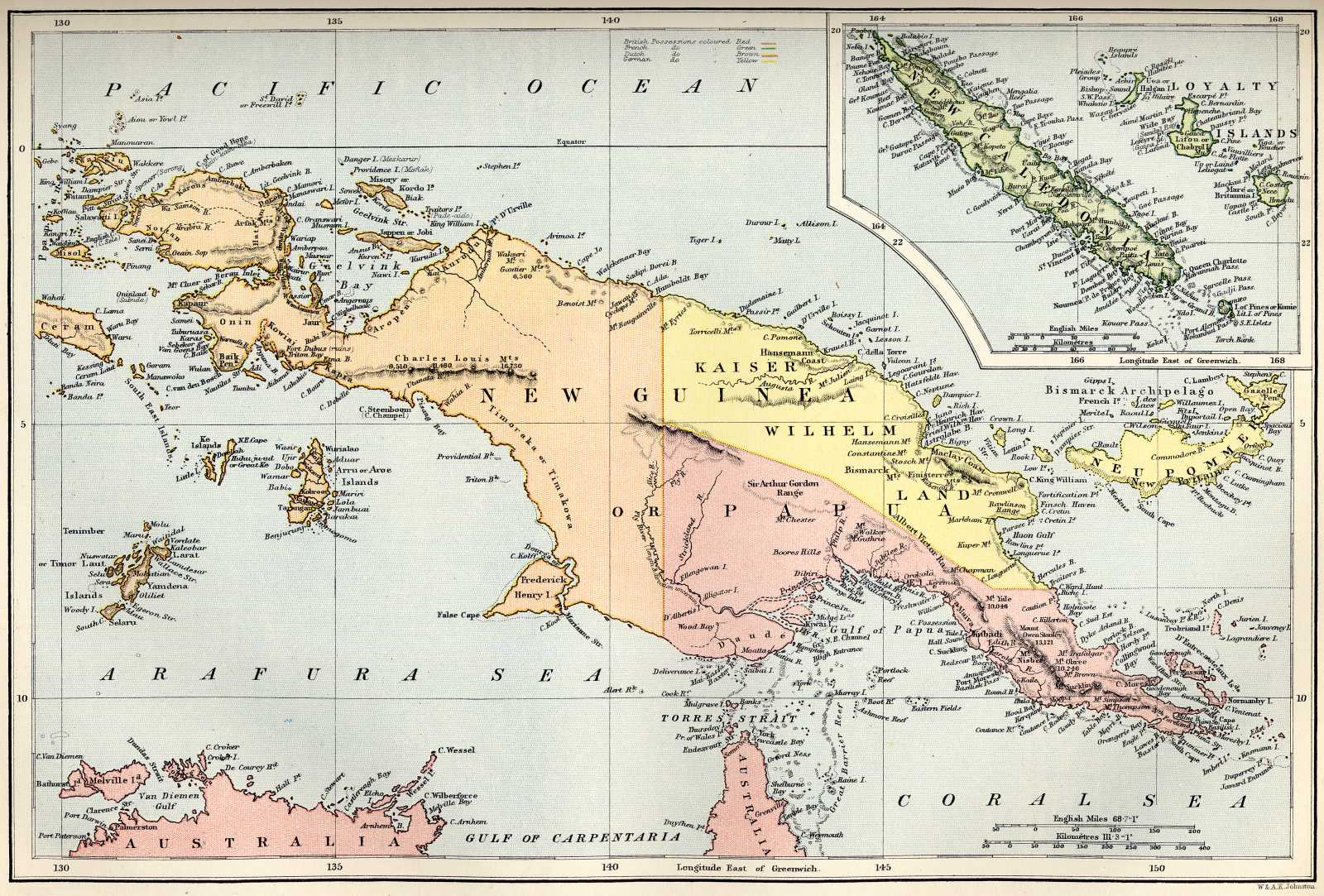
1884 map showing Komoran merged with "Frederick Henry Island"

It was considered to be a part of mainland New Guinea until 1835, when between April 26 and May 9 that year the Dutch captains Langenberg, Kool and Banse sailed their schooners Postillon and Sireen through the narrow channels. They named the waterway 'Princess Marianne Strait' (now Muli Strait) and the island after Prince William Frederick Henry, a grandson of the king, who lived in the Dutch East Indies for a while. Until at least 1884 Komoran was thought to be part of Dolak. After the handover of Western New Guinea to Indonesia in May 1963, the Indonesian government renamed the island after the Indonesian naval officer Yos Sudarso, who was in charge of a raid on the New Guinea coastline 700 km (430 mi) to the northwest in January 1962, but was killed in the process.

== Languages ==
The Kolopom languages, part of the Trans-New Guinea language family, and the Mombum (or Komolom) languages, an independent language family, are spoken on Yos Sudarso Island.

== See also ==
- Southern New Guinea freshwater swamp forests
