= List of Naked and Afraid episodes =

Naked and Afraid is an American reality series that airs on the Discovery Channel. Each episode chronicles the lives of two survivalists (1 woman; 1 man) who meet for the first time and are given the task of surviving a stay in the wilderness naked for 21 days. After they meet in the assigned locale, the partners must find and/or produce potable water, food, shelter, and clothing within the environment.

== Series overview ==
Season	Episodes	Originally released	
Season	Episodes	First released	Last released
1	6	June 23, 2013	December 14, 2013
2	6	March 16, 2014	April 27, 2014
3	10	June 22, 2014	October 12, 2014
4	12	April 19, 2015	August 2, 2015
5	5	October 4, 2015	November 1, 2015
6	12	March 13, 2016	June 12, 2016
7	11	March 5, 2017	May 21, 2017
8	6	July 30, 2017	August 20, 2017
9	15	March 11, 2018	August 12, 2018
10	26	March 3, 2019	December 19, 2019
11	30	December 1, 2019	August 16, 2020
12	11	March 7, 2021	April 18, 2021
13	6	August 1, 2021	September 5, 2021
14	13	February 26, 2022	April 23, 2022
15	11	February 19, 2023	April 30, 2023
16	5	October 15, 2023	November 12, 2023
17	12	February 18, 2024	May 5, 2024
18	12	March 9, 2025	May 11, 2025
19	TBA	February 15, 2026	TBA

== Episodes ==
=== Season 1 (2013) ===
No. overall	No. in season	Title	Original release date	Prod. code	U.S. viewers (millions)
1	1	"The Jungle Curse"	June 23, 2013	104	4.15
Shane Lewis and Kim Shelton have to survive 21 days in the Costa Rican jungle, where a producer has survived a venomous snake bite.
2	2	"Terror in Tanzania"	June 30, 2013	101	1.70
Survivalists E.J. Snyder and Kellie Nightlinger survive in Tanzania's Serengeti Plain, putting their skills to the ultimate test.
3	3	"Island From Hell"	July 7, 2013	102	2.16
Jonathan Klay and Alison Teal are marooned on an island in the Maldives archipelago for 21 days and clash with sunburn, sand fleas and starvation.
4	4	"Punishment in Panama"	July 14, 2013	103	2.59
Clint Jivoin and Laura Zerra have to stay 21 days on a Panamanian island, plagued with sand flies and threatened by snakes: pit vipers and boas.
5	5	"Breaking Borneo"	July 21, 2013	105	3.27
Survivalists Puma Cabra and Julie Wright have to survive 21 days in Borneo, Malaysia, battling sickness, starvation, and wildlife.
6	6	"Beware the Bayou"	July 28, 2013	106	3.61
Billy Berger and Ky Furneaux survive 21 days in the swamps of Louisiana, risking attack from deadly snakes, bloodsucking leeches, and alligators.
7	7	"Special: Bares All"	August 3, 2013	107	1.96
Recap, extra footage and commentary with the season 1 cast including their families.
8	8	"Special: Double Jeopardy"	December 8, 2013	108	2.44
Cassie DePecol, Forrest Galante, Manu Toigo and Russell Sage on the Panamanian coast.
9	9	"Special: Bares All 2"	December 14, 2013	109	1.15
Recap, extra footage and commentary with the episode 8 cast, including their families.

=== Season 2 (2014) ===
No. overall	No. in season	Title	Original release date	Prod. code	U.S. viewers (millions)
10	1	"Man Vs. Amazon"	March 16, 2014	201	2.85
Both Amanda "AK" Kaye and Tyler Steinle failed to survive in the Amazon rainforest of Peru after tapping out; Season 1 castaways EJ Snyder and Laura Zerra arrived to complete AK and Tyler's 21-day challenge.
11	2	"Damned in Africa"	March 23, 2014	202	2.04
Jeff Zausch and Eva Rupert test their survival skills in the harsh desert of Madagascar's Massif D'Isalo. Their camp caught fire when they attempted to cook snake meat and they barely survived.
12	3	"Paradise Lost"	March 30, 2014	203	2.08
Alana Barfield and Keith Busch have a deserted island in Fiji all to themselves.
13	4	"Mayan Misery"	April 6, 2014	204	1.74
Shannon Thomas and Leonard "Cass" Cassidy are challenged to survive in a flooded jungle in Belize.
14	5	"The Pain Forest"	April 13, 2014	205	2.30
Firefighter Fernando Calderon and single mom Samantha Pearson endure relentless storms in a Malaysia rain forest.
15	6	"Meltdown in Bolivia"	April 20, 2014	206	2.39
Vincent Pinto and Sabrina Mergenthaler face flash floods and heat exhaustion in a Bolivian jungle. Vincent suffered from stomach ache on day 16, and Sabrina suffered severe abdominal pain on day 20, one day short to end the 21 day challenge.
16	7	"Special: Bares All: Starvation, Snakes and Strife"	April 27, 2014	207	1.59
Recap, extra footage and commentary with the season 2 survivalists including their families.

=== Season 3 (2014) ===
No. overall	No. in season	Title	Original release date	Prod. code	U.S. viewers (millions)
17	1	"Special: New Season Exposed"	June 22, 2014	301	1.18
Preview of the new season of Naked and Afraid.
18	2	"Primal Fear"	June 29, 2014	302	2.36
Lindsey Leitelt and Luke McLaughlin are challenged in a dense harsh land in Namibia.
19	3	"Blood in the Water"	July 6, 2014	303	2.12
Dani Julien and Justin Bullard are stranded in the Bahamas' Andros islands, dealing with starvation and tiny predators.
20	4	"Hearts of Darkness"	July 13, 2014	304	2.32
Carrie Booze and Tom Touw survive with crocodiles and extreme heat in Cambodia.
21	5	"Jungle Love"	July 20, 2014	305	2.11
Jaclyn McCaffrey and Adam Young survive in Nicaragua, battling dehydration and freezing temperatures.
22	6	"Argentina Impossible"	July 27, 2014	306	2.11
Survival coach Tom McElroy and pediatrician Lisa Coray battle storms and dehydration in Argentina's Yungas forest.
23	7	"Playing With Fire"	August 3, 2014	307	2.43
Corinne Kohlen and Chris Fischer are stranded on a deserted beach in Dominica. Corinne taps out on day 13 and Chris is left alone for the remaining time.
24	8	"Himalayan Hell"	August 17, 2014	308	2.15
An Iraq War veteran Hakim Isler and a nudist Phaedra Brothers tackle the high altitude and extreme cold of the Himalayan foothills in northern India. Phaedra battles food poisoning from before her arrival and suffers through bladder and kidney infections.
25	9	"Nicaragua Nightmare"	September 7, 2014	309	1.87
Joshua Bell and Amanda Leigh face the hot and swampy jungles of southern Nicaragua armed with only a machete and a roll of duct tape. Joshua taps out on Day 5 due to dehydration and Amanda survives all alone for the rest of the 21 days.
26	10	"Botswana Breakdown"	September 14, 2014	310	1.83
Ashley Burns and Michael Jefferson attempt to survive dazzling heat in Botswana. Ashley was medically evacuated on day 3 after suffering dizziness, while Michael tapped out on day 12 after hurting his kidney.
27	11	"Dunes of Despair"	September 21, 2014	311	2.27
Honora Bowen and Matt Strutzel survive hunger and dehydration in Brazil's Northeast Region. Despite Honora's being forced to tap out due to passing out from severe heat, Matt completes the challenge all alone.
28	12	"Special: Bares All: Blood, Sweat and Fears"	September 28, 2014	312	N/A
29	13	"Special: Snaketacular Clip Show"	October 5, 2014	313	N/A
30	14	"Special: Naked and Awkward"	October 12, 2014	314	N/A

=== Season 4 (2015) ===
No. overall	No. in season	Title	Original release date	Prod. code	U.S. viewers (millions)
31	1	"Alligator Alley"	April 19, 2015	401	2.71
Army mom Amber Hargrove and U.S. marine Ryan Holt battle Florida panthers, alligators, water snakes and mosquitoes in the South Florida Everglades.
32	2	"Rumble in the Jungle"	April 26, 2015	402	2.42
Christina McQueen and Steve Hansen take on the jungle in Mexico's Quintana Roo for 21 days – but it remains to be seen how they will cope with the sleepless, bug-filled nights.
33	3	"Mayan Sacrifice"	May 3, 2015	403	2.55
Southern Californian Luke Pytlik and survival instructor Alyssa Ballestero must survive dehydration, hunger and the threat of caiman in Mexico's Yucatán Peninsula.
34	4	"Edge of Madness"	May 10, 2015	404	2.31
Afften DeShazer and Zack Buck travel to Guyana where they face severe heat and harsh conditions on their trek through the savanna.
35	5	"Fire on the Mountain"	May 17, 2015	405	2.37
Experienced outdoorsman Trenton Harper teams up with newcomer Jennifer Cochran to test their limits in the Himalayas in Udhampur, India.
36	6	"Lord of the Rats"	May 31, 2015	406	2.44
Darrin Reay, a loner, and Angela Narduzzi, a workaholic mom, must survive on Thailand's Ko Muk Island versus monkeys and rats.
37	7	"Colombian Conflict"	June 7, 2015	407	2.29
Charlie Frattini, a no-nonsense New Yorker and former marine, and Dani Beau, a nature-loving vegetarian, attempt to survive for 21 days on the Mendihuaca River in the Colombian jungle.
38	8	"Special: Bares All: Survival in Close Quarters"	June 14, 2015	408	N/A
Footage of the survivalists reveals good, bad, awkward and weird moments from their various adventures.
39	9	"Garden of Evil"	June 21, 2015	409	1.92
Brandon Dix, a Navy veteran, and Robin Barber, a military mom, must survive in Mexico's Cayo Venado, where they encounter a panther and attempt to avoid poisonous tree sap.
40	10	"Redemption Road"	June 28, 2015	410	2.35
Amanda "AK" Kaye from Season 2 returns for a second chance and teams with Jason Szabo in an attempt to survive the jungles of Guyana.
41	11	"Surthrive"	July 19, 2015	411	N/A
Debbie Harris, an RN and mother of three, and Bo Stuart, a Green Beret, try to survive in the Surama rainforest in Guyana for 21 days.
42	12	"Special: Easier Said than Done"	July 26, 2015	412	N/A
In this special episode, two fans of the show, Kristin Young and Paolo Di Girolamo, winners of the #ShowUsWhatYouGot "Naked and Afraid" contest, strip down and try to survive the jungle of Nicaragua for 14 days.
43	13	"Special: Bares All: On The Edge"	August 2, 2015	413	N/A
Survivalists and fans reveal their perspective on a challenge, including unaired footage and interviews.

=== Season 5 (2015) ===
No. overall	No. in season	Title	Original release date	Prod. code	US viewers (millions)
44	1	"Forsaken"	October 4, 2015	501	N/A
When sparks don't fly deep in Panama's Isla San José, an ex-cop Gary Underhill and a "wild child" Kim Kelly clash over cuddling. But when the challenge overwhelms one of them, the other must forage, trap and even kill to keep a glimmer of hope alive.
45	2	"Fear The Unknown"	October 11, 2015	502	N/A
Trent Nielsen and Annie Foley are afraid of the dark in the mysterious Mayan jungles of Belize.
46	3	"The Darkest Hour"	October 18, 2015	503	N/A
Mountaineer Joe Brandl and former cop Andrea Lopez survive in Namibia, which is home to dangerous predators, but inner demons seem to cause more trouble.
47	4	"The Swarm"	October 25, 2015	504	N/A
Tara Skubella and Dustin Hobbs must endure the jungles of Panama's Isla San José, where disease-carrying insects may prove to be the team's greatest threat.
48	5	"All or Nothing"	November 1, 2015	505	N/A
Hunter Jeremy McCaa and surfer girl Cassidy Flynn must survive on West Nalaut Island in the Philippines.

=== Season 6 (2016) ===
No. overall	No. in season	Title	Original release date	Prod. code	US viewers (millions)
49	1	"Special: Into The Wild"	March 6, 2016	601	1.26
Twelve pairs of survivalists compete over six continents in this first-look at Season 6.
50	2	"King of the Forest"	March 13, 2016	602	2.28
Outdoor marathon enthusiast Chalese Meyer teams up with artist/athlete Steven Lee Hall Jr. in a trek through the Alabama backwoods.
51	3	"Frozen In Fear"	March 20, 2016	603	2.21
Cassie Turner and Greg Wells battle through cold rain, bear and moose at Canada's Bark Lake.
52	4	"Rise Above"	March 27, 2016	604	2.11
Jake Nodar, a horse trainer, and Jamie Little, a wilderness teacher, survive in the Amazon rainforest in Colombia's Amazonas Department near the border of Brazil.
53	5	"From the Ashes"	April 3, 2016	605	2.04
Stacey Osorio, a biology student, and Lee Trew, a survival instructor, team up on the wetland of Kopački Rit in northeast Croatia, but a freak accident may derail their challenge.
54	6	"All Falls Down"	April 10, 2016	606	2.40
Athlete Kacie Cleveland and stay-at-home dad Aaron Phillips survive in the jungles of Belize, facing jaguars, snakes and bizarre weather.
55	7	"Contamination"	April 17, 2016	607	2.13
Karen Coffee, a stay-at-home mom, and Matt Alexander, a trucker, survive in a Philippine forest after a typhoon.
56	8	"Hell or High Water"	April 24, 2016	608	2.23
Matt Wright and Lindsay Boisclair battle sickness and torrential rains in Thailand's Sai Rung River Valley.
57	9	"The Danger Within"	May 1, 2016	609	2.25
Tawny Lynn and Julio Castano travel to Florida's Seminole Forest, where they encounter gators and bears.
58	10	"Special: Bares All: Never Give Up"	May 8, 2016	610	N/A
Recap, extra footage and commentary with the season 6 survivalists including their families.
59	11	"Melt Down Under"	May 15, 2016	611	2.19
Adventure guide Nicklas Lautakoski and Air Force veteran Laura Thompson-Nelson are dropped into the Australian Outback where they encounter windstorms, freezing temperatures and sleep deprivation, but their greatest danger may be each other.
60	12	"Bad Blood"	May 22, 2016	612	2.10
Angel Rodriguez and Nicole Terry trek through the lowland lake beds of Nicaragua.
61	13	"Strength in Pain"	May 29, 2016	613	1.90
Real estate agent Bree Walker and survival instructor Clarence Gilmer II survive in the primal fears of a rainforest in Honduras.
62	14	"23 Days"	June 5, 2016	614	2.17
Don Nguyen and Holly Simmons attempt to take around Namibia's Caprivi Strip. Holly voluntarily left on day 2 due to sickness; Amber Hargrove (from Season 4) replaced her to restart the 21-day challenge, and dropped after 9 days.
63	15	"Special: Bares All: Battered and Broken"	June 12, 2016	615	N/A
Recap, extra footage and commentary with the season 6 survivalists including their families.

Note that in addition to the above, there are also a number of unlisted Pop-Up Editions (which have different titles from their original episodes), and specials, such as "Franco and Rogen", featuring James Franco and Seth Rogen.

=== Season 7 (2017) ===
No. overall	No. in season	Title	Original release date	Prod. code	US viewers (millions)
64	1	"Eye of the Storm"	March 5, 2017	701	1.95
Lacey Jones, a wild child, and Jason Gassaway, a retired sergeant take on torrential weather in southern Belize with a huge hurricane coming. After spending the night in a bunker, the two begin their challenge on a completely devastated island.
65	2	"Washed Out"	March 12, 2017	702	1.80
Wes Adams, an extreme athlete, and Giovanna Horning, a book smart bartender, tackle an Ecuadorian cloud forest where it rains daily.
66	3	"Hangry"	March 19, 2017	703	1.77
Marine Timothy Lair and stonemason Shannon Kulpa take on armies of stinging red ants and bubbling mud volcanoes on the Caribbean island of Trinidad. Even with this daunting location working against them, their biggest struggle is actually each other.
67	4	"Special: Bares All: Naked Nights"	March 26, 2017	704	1.36
Surviving in the wilderness for 21 days stripped of clothes, food and water is the ultimate test of survival. Daytime presents its own dangers, but come night fall the survivalists are faced with a whole new set of threats.
68	5	"Ashes to Ashes"	April 2, 2017	705	1.77
Survival instructor Chad Keel and armed forces retiree Dawn Dussault are inserted into the volcano ravaged island of Montserrat (British Overseas Territory). With completely different survival styles, they find a way to work together but one accident has an eruptive effect on both of them.
69	6	"Special: The Lost World"	April 9, 2017	706	1.92
Two fans of the show are selected for a special 14-day survival challenge. Single mom Gabrielle Balassone and optimist Jonathan Short try to survive the Wild Coast of South Africa.
70	7	"The Monster"	April 16, 2017	707	1.99
Maria Corrales, a Buddhist, and Dan Gardner, a fisherman, test their skills against the unforgiving Australian outback, where harsh conditions, scarce food sources and saltwater crocodiles threaten their survival.
71	8	"Unhinged"	April 23, 2017	708	1.92
Marine Geoff Wilson and perky Southern gal Melissa LeEllen attempt to survive three weeks in Panama's Burbayar Jungle. Constant downpours, cabin fever, threats from predators, lack of sleep and extreme hunger soon take its toll on one of them.
72	9	"Curse of the Swamp: part 1"	April 30, 2017	709	2.19
Jeremy McCaa from Season 5 returns for his chance at redemption in the infamous Atchafalaya Swamp in Louisiana and is joined by Michelle Etchings, an Air Force veteran. Trouble hits the partnership early on and the episode takes a turn: Michelle tapped out early and was replaced by Melanie Rauscher.
73	10	"Curse of the Swamp: part 2"	May 7, 2017	710	2.14
Jeremy and Melanie continue their challenge in the infamous haunted swamps of Louisiana, as they endure constant threats from predators while desperately trying to secure food to keep them going.
74	11	"Arachnid Overload"	May 14, 2017	711	1.93
Survival-savvy yoga teacher David Scott and custom knife maker Kaila Cummings tackle the brutal jungle of Quebrada Valencia in Colombia. Their primitive survival skills are impressive, but the deadly spiders and ticks test both their courage and resilience, threatening to take them down.
75	12	"Worlds Collide Part 1"	May 21, 2017	712	1.99
Former military man Chance Davis is paired with optimistic naturalist Melissa Miller in the jungles of Ecuador. Humidity, violent storms, caiman and red-bellied piranha are just some of the threats they face. When they make it to Day 20, in a series first, they are given a choice: finish their challenge or join the cast of Naked and Afraid XL. Chance decided to compete with the XL group and Melissa completed her challenge in Day 21. The episode begins as a two-part special that continues on Naked and Afraid XL season 3 episode 6.

=== Season 8 (2017) ===
No. overall	No. in season	Title	Original release date	Prod. code	US viewers (millions)
76	0	"Special: Suffering, Sunburn And Sharks"	July 30, 2017	801	N/A
We discover the grueling locations the survivalists will encounter and what some of their most dangerous threats and challenges will be, getting up close and personal with six pairs of new survivalists.
77	1	"Lost At Sea"	July 30, 2017	802	1.48
Divemaster Sarah Danser and former Navy seal Ben Johnson are, for the first time in Naked and Afraid history, stranded at sea. On their arduous journey to land at Exuma Cays, Bahamas, they face exposure to deadly sharks and heatstroke. If they make it to land, can they work together despite their different approaches to survival?
78	2	"Texan Torture"	August 2, 2017	803	1.43
McKenzie Clark, a surfer from Hawaii, and Scott Thompson, ex-military personnel, take on the Texas countryside, surrounded by armadillo, bighorn sheep and vicious wild boar; as they battle starvation and face a potentially fatal flood, their skills get fully put to the test.
79	3	"The Hunted"	August 3, 2017	804	N/A
Sarah Wiley, a mother, and Dustin Campbell, a country boy, are dropped into the jaguar-filled jungle of Belize. While they hunt for food, something is hunting them, and the mental part of the challenge gets to them both.
80	4	"Rain Of Terror"	August 6, 2017	805	1.55
Kaila Donaldson, a mother, and Trevor Rasmussen, an adventure addict, drop into the cloud forest of Ecuador. Unbearably wet conditions, violent lightning, cabin fever, trench foot and finger-slicing machetes threaten to keep the pair from completing their 21-day challenge.
81	5	"Stone Cold"	August 13, 2017	806	1.71
Army vet Samantha Ohl and newlywed Adam Adams grapple with gender norms as they take on the mountains of Croatia. Extreme hunger and frigid temperatures force this unlikely pair to bond together, but a vicious storm threatens to rip them apart.
82	6	"Special: Belize Breakdown"	August 20, 2017	807	1.58
On this fan episode of Naked and Afraid, pro surfer Anastasia Ashley and YouTuber Cory Williams take their shot at surviving Naked and Afraid. Do they have what it takes to survive 14 days completely unplugged from civilization in the jungles of Belize?

=== Season 9 (2018) ===
No. overall	No. in season	Title	Original release date	Prod. code	US viewers (millions)
83	0	"Special: Unsurvivable"	March 11, 2018	901	1.06
Mother Nature is full throttle this season as 20 new survivalists attempt the 21-day challenge. Hurricanes, broken bones, unrelenting insects, bear encounters, deadly snakes and wasp stings on the worst of places ... just a usual day for Naked and Afraid.
84	1	"Category 5 Survival"	March 11, 2018	902	1.54
In the swamps of Florida's Wekiva River basin, a category five Hurricane blasts through the camp of Amal Alyassiri, an Iraqi war refugee now living in Iowa, and her partner Duke Brady. In addition to the hurricane, the pair also endure venomous spiders, insects, and nocturnal predators.
85	2	"A Screw Loose"	March 18, 2018	903	1.37
For survivalist Leah Chandler and shaman Caesar Aliva, surviving 21 days in a haunted Mayan jungle in Chiapas, Mexico is a struggle as they are faced with suffocating humidity, hungry predators, torrential rainfall, unrelenting insects and intoxicating fruit. Leah was forced to tap out on Day 3 when her previously injured collarbone was re-injured; Caesar finally tapped out on Day 9 due to lack of sleep and food and continual insect attacks.
86	3	"Swamp Queen"	March 25, 2018	904	1.40
In the snake-filled Mississippi swamps, Gabrielle Balassone, a former fan survivalist, takes on the full 21-day challenge. Gabrielle and newcomer Brian Schultz are faced with deadly snakes, unrelenting mosquitos, nocturnal predators and a relentless week-long thunderstorm. Brian tapped out on Day 7, and Gabrielle completed the challenge alone.
87	4	"Forbidden Fruit"	April 1, 2018	905	1.33
Gary Golding and Karra Falkenstein are put to the test of surviving the savanna of the Jalapao region of Brazil, where bug swarms and lack of food put them to the limit. Depleted and broken, will either of them make it to Day 21?
88	5	"Special: Island of Tears"	April 8, 2018	906	1.41
Max Djenohan and Bianca Isidro face off with aggressive caiman, boa constrictors, large spiders and thorny mangroves in this Superfan 14-day challenge on a tropical island in Panama.
89	6	"Thieves In The Night"	April 15, 2018	907	1.38
Ava Holmes and Larry Little are set to survive in the harsh Mayan Jungle in the Yucatán part of Mexico. They are faced with jaguars, disease-carrying bats, malnutrition, and one survivalist even falls into the roaring fire. Larry tapped out early and was replaced by Steven Townes. The challenge was ended early when the participants were caught stealing food and bottled water from the crew tent.
90	7	"Love At First Fight"	April 22, 2018	908	1.48
Leah McCabe and Wes Heustess are challenged to survive in the jungles of Isla Zapatera in Nicaragua. They face off with thorns, painful fire ants, stinging plants, jaguars, flash floods, vampire bats, sharp lava rocks and bull sharks. After Wes taps out on day 4, he is replaced by James Lewis. Leah taps out on day 8, leaving James to complete the challenge by himself.
91	8	"Burnt to a Crisp"	April 29, 2018	909	1.47
LeAnn Duncan and Lee Diehl are faced to survive in the hurricane-hit region of Indio Maiz in Nicaragua. They must battle with the blazing heat, territorial animals and the disheveled landscape from the hurricane.
92	9	"Loaded For Bear"	May 6, 2018	910	1.60
Jermaine Jackson and Teal Bulthuis are set to survive in the Smoky Mountains of Tennessee where they will face aggressive black bears, frigid temperatures and deadly rattlesnakes. With threats all around them, will they complete the challenge?
93	10	"Pick Your Poison"	May 13, 2018	911	1.53
Anthony Coppage and Suzänne Zeta (formerly Taylor) are challenged to survive on the Soninho River of Brazil where they must face ravenous jaguars, stinging wasps and scorching heat. With little habitable conditions, will either complete the challenge?
94	11	"Trouble in Paradise"	June 10, 2018	912	N/A
Torrential downpours and brutal wind storms push starving survivalists Rylie Parlett and Kyle Oelofse to their breaking points in the Honduran jungle.
95	12	"Special: Fan Down"	June 24, 2018	913	1.53
After being chosen in the #ShowUsWhatYouGot Naked And Afraid contest, fan favorites Maci Bookout and Justin Tuell get ready to strip down and start their special 14 day challenge in the treacherous Nicaraguan jungle.
96	13	"Special: Naked And Afraid Of Sharks"	July 29, 2018	914	1.99
Discovery Channel brought together Naked and Afraid and Shark Week in the form of the two-hour special. Former N&A participants Ky Furneaux, Ryan Holt, Chris Fischer, Steven Lee Hall and Eva Rupert are stranded on an island in the middle of the most shark-infested waters in the world for 14 days (Bahamas).
97	14	"Blindsided"	August 5, 2018	915	1.35
A dangerous burn and clashing survival strategies plague returning survivalist Steven Townes and newcomer Angela Hammer in the jungles of Rio Morales in Panama. Angela tapped out on Day 7 after learning of her ex-husband's unexpected death. Steven tapped out on Day 12 after suffering an eye injury and from loneliness.
98	15	"Special: Eaten Alive"	August 12, 2018	916	N/A
Spiders, botflies, mosquitoes and other torturous bugs and insects are always the unexpected threat that take down survivalists on Naked and Afraid.
99	16	"Fire And Fury"	August 12, 2018	917	1.27
Returning survivalists Angela Hammer and Chad Keel fight the elements and each other as they look for double Redemption on a predator-filled plain in South Africa.

=== Season 10 (2019) ===
No. overall	No. in season	Title	Original release date	Prod. code	US viewers (millions)
100	0	"Naked Gets Weird"	March 2, 2019	1001	0.83
Surviving 21 days naked in the wilderness leads to weird and awkward moments. From bizarre prep and mortifying naked intros to nighttime cuddling gone wrong to learning bathroom routines the hard way, Naked and Afraid gets weird.
101	1	"Frozen And Afraid"	March 3, 2019	1001	1.99
Dropped onto a frozen Alaskan glacier in the Boreal Tundra, All-Star survivalists Laura Zerra and Steven Lee Hall scramble to stave off frostbite and hypothermia in a 14-day "Frozen and Afraid" challenge. Aggressive moose and porcupine are both threats and potential food sources as their skills are put to the test.
102	2	"You've Got Another Sting Coming"	March 3, 2019	1002	1.96
On a sun-scorched Brazilian island surrounded by aggressive anaconda and deadly stingrays and constantly tormented by mosquitoes, survivalists Whitney Hamblin and Nathan Martinez are pushed to their breaking point. Working together, they must use all of their hunting and fishing skills to try and make it for 21 days.
103	3	"No Safety in Numbers"	March 10, 2019	1003	1.52
Two pairs of survivalists (former fan favorite survivalist Max Djenohan, lone-wolf hunter Seth Reece and female survivalists Kate Wentworth and Sara Burkett) are surprised when they must take on the deadly jungles of Panama side by side, but before the 21-day challenge truly begins they must re-think their survival strategies gender-wise.
104	4	"Naked and Afraid: Bootcamp"	March 17, 2019	1004	1.62
Two Naked and Afraid super-fans get special training with N&A veteran Gabrielle Balassone before setting off for a 21-day challenge with all-stars Matt Wright and Gary Golding.
105	5	"Threesome"	March 17, 2019	1005	1.54
In the Ecuadorian jungle, taxidermist/homesteader Sarah Bartell and survivalist David Shirley are unexpectedly joined by a third survivalist - naturalist/yoga instructor Makani Nalu - whose different style and attitude may cause trouble.
106	6	"Baked Alaskan"	March 17, 2019	1006	N/A
The jungle in Chacahua, Mexico proves no vacation spot for Alaskan homesteader Gwen Grimes and her partner Jon Hart when the 21-day challenge includes being bitten by a tarantula and a foot injury.
107	7	"Stomping Grounds"	March 24, 2019	1007	1.57
In South Africa's Limpopo Basin, elite survivalists Matt Wright and Gary Golding must protect novice survivalists and super-fans attorney Molly Jansen and dog sledder Blair Braverman first as separate teams for 10 days then merging on Day 11 while dealing with spitting cobras, territorial elephants and a violent last-minute storm. Being unused to the unyielding heat, Blair was forced to tap out on Day 14.
108	8	"Bite Club"	March 31, 2019	1008	1.55
On the plains of Mozambique, Brooke Wright, the wife of elite N&A survivalist Matt Wright, is teamed up with Dylan McWilliams, a three-time survivor of animal attacks, but when he is felled by bad water and forced to tap out she must go on alone.
109	9	"The Spirits Are Angry"	March 31, 2019	1009	1.64
In Colombia's Magdalena Department, Turkish immigrant and border patrol agent Bulent Gurcan and mountain climber Cat Orza's 21-day challenge takes a foreboding turn when the jungle itself seems to have placed a curse on them.
110	10	"Stalked on All Sides"	April 14, 2019	1010	1.25
Pinned down on a riverbank in Mapungubwe, South Africa by elephants, hippos and lions, Earth Mother Kelly Roske and Army veteran Eric Jorgenson work together to avoid becoming prey. When he re-injured his previously wounded knee, Eric was forced to medically tap out on Day 4.
111	11	"Naked and Haunted"	April 14, 2019	1011	1.09
Surviving 21 days naked in the wilderness has all sorts of physical dangers, from dangerous predators and poisonous insects to unforgiving weather and inhospitable terrain. But how can any N&A challenger be expected to deal with the unknown and unexplainable... and downright terrifying? Both survivalists and crew members have scary tales to tell, including footage from an unaired episode in which returning survivalist Leah Chandler and yoga instructor Justin took on the haunted jungles of Colombia and lost.
112	12	"Swamp Don't Care"	April 21, 2019	1012	1.43
All-Star survivalists Jake Nodar and Melissa Miller take on the punishing Blackwater Swamp in Florida, which teems with poisonous snakes, aggressive alligators and torrential rains that threaten to flood the area. When one of the survivalists becomes disorientated from lack of food and sleep and wanders away from camp, local authorities are called in to help conduct an all-out search.
113	13	"What The Duck?"	April 28, 2019	1013	N/A
In Montebello, Mexico's unforgiving, cenote-covered landscape, fan survivalists executive assistant Holly Roberts and remote field biologist Dan Link are dropped for a 14-day challenge into an area filled with venomous coral snakes, territorial jaguars, blood-sucking chaquistes, mosquitoes and black flies and a duck named Henry that they desperately want to eat for dinner.
114	14	"For Better or a Lot Worse"	May 5, 2019	1014	N/A
The very first N&A couple, former Special Forces veteran Tony Wheeler and former Marine Star Torres, faces challenges to themselves and their relationship as they take on the relentless Guyana jungle, where they must work together to battle jaguars, venomous snakes, caiman and more than two million species of biting insects, culminating in a challenge conclusion that has to be seen to be believed!
115	15	"Don't Let the Jungle Bugs Bite"	May 12, 2019	1015	N/A
Avoiding the dangers of a rushing river in the rain forest of Rio Claro, Colombia, New Jersey bartender Trish Bulinsky and mountain climber Jeremy Upshaw are tested by the jungle with threats like venomous fer-de-lance snakes, piranhas and biting insects everywhere.
116	16	"Meltdown on the Mountain"	May 19, 2019	1016	N/A
Dropped into a high-altitude jungle in the Sierra Nevada de Santa Marta mountain range near Minca, Colombia, EMT Tommy Brown and Army Reservist Leah Olszewski face territorial pumas, howler monkeys and venomous fer-de-lance snakes, but the biggest threat may be the extreme temperature changes with highs of up 100 °F (38 °C) and lows plummeting down into the 40s (°F). Unable to take the extreme cold, Leah tapped out on Day 2, leaving Tommy to complete the challenge alone.
117	17	"Just Kidding"	May 26, 2019	1017	N/A
Naked in the jungle with a complete stranger leads to funny moments. Through blood, sweat, tears, snake bites, third-degree burns and rashes in hard-to-reach places that N&A survivalists have to endure, laughter can be the most critical skill.
118	18	"Honduran Hell"	June 16, 2019	1018	N/A
In the mountainous rainforest of Honduras, survivalist Quince Mountain with an unusual past is paired with hard-headed police detective Theresa Owens to try and survive 21 days, but predatorial jaguars, swarms of fire ants and a debilitating injury threaten their challenge.
119	19	"Stalked on the Savannah"	June 23, 2019	1019	N/A
In a punishing Brazilian savannah of Cerrado, survivalists Wes Harper and Jesse Everett deal with searing heat as well as paralyzing wasps, aggressive bees, and poisonous rattlesnakes. But a territorial jaguar family circling their shelter may cost them the 21-day challenge.
120	20	"Stalked on the Savannah Part 2"	June 30, 2019	1020	N/A
In a continuation on the Brazilian savannah of Cerrado, survivalists Wes Harper and Jesse Everett continue their 21 day challenge. They continue with a nearby jaguar, and Jesse takes on bees.
121	21	"Anaconda River Rapids"	September 21, 2019	1021	N/A
TBA
122	22	"Feel the Burn"	September 26, 2019	1022	N/A
Dropped into Guyana's scorching savannah, super fans Shane Bulloch and Jennifer Taylor battle the oppressive heat and relentless insect attacks; scorching temperatures lead to severe dehydration and force a desperate fan to risk illness by drinking unsanitary fluids.
123	23	"Special: Rainforests and Deserts"	October 3, 2019	1023	N/A
Three pairs of survivalists take on humidity in the rainforests of Honduras, sleep deprivation and serious injuries in the African Savanna and a potentially fatal flood in the wilds of Texas.
124	24	"Special: Bloodthirsty and Vicious"	November 21, 2019	1024	N/A
A firefighter and a single mother confront bloodthirsty insects in the Malaysian rainforest; survivalists are surrounded by armadillos and wild boars in the Texas countryside; a team faces apex predators in Tennessee's Great Smoky Mountains.
125	25	"Special: Resentment, Rain, and Rivers"	December 5, 2019	1025	N/A
A group of three struggles with their team dynamics; torrential rains and large cats threaten a duo deep in the jungles of Ecuador; a single mother and a special ops veteran battle the Sai Rung River Valley in Thailand.
126	26	"Special: Deadly Aggression"	December 19, 2019	1026	N/A
Two survivalists navigate the dense jungles on a deserted Panamanian island; an all-star duo goes on an unprecedented 60-day challenge on the Philippine island of Palawan; a team overcomes clashing survival strategies in the jungles of Panama.

=== Season 11 (2019–20) ===
No. overall	No. in season	Title	Original release date	Prod. code	US viewers (millions)
127	0	"Special: No One to Watch Your Back"	December 1, 2019	1101	N/A
A first look at the new season of the series.
128	0a	"Special: Nature's Evil"	December 12, 2019	1102	N/A
A U.S. Navy veteran and a military mother take on the harsh Mexican island of Cayo Venado; terrifying sounds strike fear into the hearts of a jittery duo in Belize; two survivalists are in for a big twist in the Amazon jungle.
129	1	"Alone: Man Up or Bow Out"	January 5, 2020	1103	N/A
Trying to survive 21 days completely alone, all-star survivalist Luke McLaughlin takes on the dangerous badlands of South Africa; stalked by ferocious lions and hyenas, Luke must get a kill in order to finish the challenge.
130	2	"Alone: Gary of the Jungle"	January 12, 2020	1104	N/A
All-star survivalist Gary Golding takes on a jungle for the first time completely alone in Belize; without a partner, Gary forms a bond with a turtle he names Timmy, but a deep cut and dangerous infection threatens Gary's challenge.
131	3	"Alone: Hunted and Haunted"	January 19, 2020	1105	N/A
Immediately circled by lions and hyenas, all-star survivalist Lacey Jones is isolated, vulnerable and sleep-deprived as she takes on the South African bush; completely alone, Lacey is pushed to a breaking point where madness awaits on the other side.
132	4	"Alone: Blazed and Confused"	January 26, 2020	1106	N/A
Desperately for a kill on the South African savannah, all-star survivalist Ryan Holt risks his safety to get in position for a better shot; a fire in his shelter could take Ryan out of the challenge.
133	5	"Alone: Max Pushed to the Max"	February 9, 2020	1107	N/A
Constantly on the run to avoid territorial rhinos, elephants and lions, survivalist Max Djenohan takes on the punishing South African savannah; Max gets a kill, but it puts his challenge at greater risk; predators close in to take his hard-earned win.
134	6	"Alone: Lonely Like The Wolf"	February 16, 2020	1108	N/A
In the frigid Bulgarian mountains, pack of wolves and territorial bears, stalk all-star survivalist EJ Snyder; without a partner to protect him and struggling to make fire, EJ becomes a target for the deadly predators.
135	7	"Wretched Wasteland"	February 2, 2020	1109	N/A
Groups of survivalists take on the harsh elements of jungles around the world. There's a catastrophic hurricane in Belize, constant downpours in Panama and bubbling mud volcanoes in Trinidad.
136	8	"Twinning"	February 23, 2020	1110	N/A
In an unprecedented Naked and Afraid challenge, identical twin sisters Amber and Serena Shine, as well as brothers Warren and Thomas Virgets, are dropped in the South African savannah; they take on rhinos, hyenas, and a territorial leopard stalking their camp.
137	9	"Survive or Ky Tryin"	February 23, 2020	1111	N/A
The Ecuadorian Amazon rainforest pushed All-star survivalist Ky Furneaux to the edge with swarms of mosquitos, bloodthirsty piranhas, and aggressive pumas; hunger and desperation lead to a risky night hunt in caiman-filled waters.
138	10	"Dominating the Darkness"	February 2, 2020	1112	N/A
Two survivalists gets frustrated while trying to navigate the flooded jungles of Belize; the man-and-woman team faces a maze of poisonous snakes and rabid bat infested caves, all in the name of conquering their fears.
139	11	"Alone: Bugging Out"	March 1, 2020	1113	N/A
In the darkness of the Belize jungle, all-star survivalist Kim Kelly is hammered by torrential downpours, relentless ticks, and terrifying howler monkeys; Kim quickly spirals into sleep deprivation which puts her at risk in the unrelenting jungle.
140	12	"Little Person, Big Challenge"	March 1, 2020	1114	N/A
Underestimated his whole life, survivalist Alex Manard, who has dwarfism, tries to prove himself in the Ecuadorian Amazon but struggles against predators and his partner, Holly Roberts.
141	13	"Bahama Drama"	March 2, 2020	1115	N/A
In the Bahamas, the two fans Daren Jackson and Morgan Reed face relentless insects and aggressive sharks during hurricane season.
142	14	"Two Tarzans, One Jane"	March 8, 2020	1116	N/A
Alexandra Martin, Daniel Rosenberg, and Michael Dietrich become the first Naked and Afraid threesome in the Colombian jungle. But, romantic complications make surviving the Colombian jungle's poisonous dart frog and deadly jaguars much more complicated.
143	15	"Close Encounters"	March 15, 2020	1122	N/A
Two strangers are dropped in one of the most dangerous South African locations in the dead heat of summer; faced with aggressive hippos and charging elephants, Ryan Eacret and Sherean Rogouski quickly learn their place but must mark their territory if they want to make it 21 days.
144	16	"Naked and Ghosted"	March 15, 2020	1123	N/A
In a brutal Mexican jungle known to be haunted by Mayan spirits, All-star survivalists Sarah Danser and Trent Nielsen are tormented by rain, predators and spirits of the Mexican rainforest.
145	17	"In Too Deep"	March 22, 2020	1124	N/A
On the edge of the Bermuda Triangle, Army veteran dive master Joe Maynard and Cajun boat captain Lisa Hagan take on relentless thunderstorms and battle dehydration as they try to navigate more than 20 miles of open ocean in the ultimate test of sink or swim.
146	18	"Blood, Sweat and Fears"	March 29, 2020	1125	N/A
Two survivalists Bulent Gurcan and Sara Burkett are back for redemption in the Mexican jungle but torrential downpours, competing survival styles and a machete accident threaten to send them home early again.
147	19	"Trying to Deal with the Devil"	March 29, 2020	1126	N/A
Deep in Mexico's Baja desert lies the scorching wasteland of the Devil's Canyon; a Canadian mountain man (Christopher James) teams up with experienced homesteader Laurae Hughes to take on the canyon's triple-digit heat, scarce water, and venomous predators.
148	20	"Biting Back at Africa"	April 5, 2020	1127	N/A
In a unique four-person challenge, a lion-attack survivor returns to South Africa to face her fears; surrounded by lions, crocodiles, and cape buffalo, the group members struggle against constant threats and one of their tribe mates as they try to survive in a kill zone. Includes Rod Biggs, Lauren Fagen, Derrick (Diggie) Roberts and Dannelle Tomarchio.
149	21	"Shaken and Very Stirred"	April 12, 2020	1128	N/A
A powerful earthquake in the Philippine jungle rattles thrill-seeking chef Jonathan Bonessi and competitive hockey mom Jessica Cornellier, but the territorial monkeys, rainstorms, lack of food, and dehydration lead to a disastrous face-first fall.
150	22	"Amazoned Out"	April 12, 2020	1129	N/A
Superfans Molly Cowles and Nate Cook are dropped deep in the Ecuadorian Amazon rainforest, a place that's taken down the best of the best; they lean on lessons learned from their couches to push through torrential rain, relentless bugs, and extreme sleep deprivation.
151	23	"Ring Of Fire"	April 19, 2020	1130	N/A
In the frigid mountains of Bulgaria, wolves circle a successful fan survivalist trying to conquer the 21-day challenge. Large fires are their defense against predators and hypothermia until the flames fan out of control and become the biggest threat. Includes Brandon Pope, Brandon Dix, and Jennifer Taylor.
152	24	"21 Miles, 21 Days"	April 26, 2020	1131	N/A
In a lethal South African hunting ground, biker chick Kaiela Hobart and taxidermist Tim Phillips have to stay on the move to survive; the pair must push across 21 miles of savannah to find food and water while avoiding a pride of lions that are tracking them every step of the way.
153	25	"Jungle Genius"	April 26, 2020	1132	N/A
Give a man a fish and you feed him for a day; teach a man to fish and you feed him for a lifetime; from shelters, traps and rafts to wilderness fashion, take a look at the survivalist's most successful primitive design and techniques.
154	26	"Honeymoon From Hell"	May 3, 2020	1133	N/A
Married couple Anna and Jered Fanning go from watching the challenge from their couch in Idaho to taking it on in the perilous Philippine jungle.
155	27	"Andrea and Joe in Namibia"	May 3, 2020	1134	N/A
Andrea and Joe get together virtually to catch up with each other and watch their challenge in Namibia; they offer fresh perspectives and new insights into their struggles, partner dynamics, and survival tactics.
156	28	"Don't Cave In"	May 10, 2020	1135	N/A
In the relentless Colombian jungle, mom and National Guard vet Jessica Kayrouz teams up with firefighter Michael Morency; violent storms and hypothermic conditions force them to humble in bat-infested caves; a special bond develops between a survivalist and a wild monkey.
157	29	"Dani and Justin in Andros Islands"	May 14, 2020	1136	N/A
Dani Julien and Justin Bullard reunite virtually to catch up with each other and watch their challenge that took place in the Andros Islands.
158	30	"Snow Daze"	May 17, 2020	1137	N/A
In the frozen American Rockies of Montana, snowstorms and freezing temperatures force the survivalists to make risky choices with their fire and food sources; an out-of-control blaze and toxic mushrooms put their challenge and safety at risk. Laurae Hughes, Dave Tucker and Sarah Salmond.
159	31	"Swimming Naked with Sharks"	August 16, 2020	1138	N/A
On the edge of Bermuda Triangle, Naked and Afraid veterans including Matt Wright, Jeff Zausch, and twin sisters Amber and Serena Shine compete with the ocean's apex predators and try to survive in waters so deadly that locals call it Shark Alley.

=== Season 12 (2021) ===
No. overall	No. in season	Title	Original release date	Prod. code	US viewers (millions)
160	1	"No Rain, No Gain"	March 7, 2021	1140	N/A
Holly Moss and Jake Johnson attempt to survive torrential downpours in the Georgia rainforest.
161	2	"Mile-High Clubbed"	March 7, 2021	1141	N/A
Survivalists Danny Graves and Hailey Barber attempt to survive while combatting altitude sickness and hypothermic weather in the Rocky mountains.
162	3	"The Devil's Woods"	March 14, 2021	1142	N/A
Joe Ortlip and Samantha Gerges are dropped off in Grizzly Mountain, Montana, high in the Rockies.
163	4	"Sand Trapped"	March 21, 2021	1143	N/A
Marine Biologist Dan Link and single mom Meghann Harris get dropped off in the Chihuahuan Desert, an area that straddles the US/Mexico border.
164	5	"Stars Against the Storm"	March 28, 2021	1144	N/A
All-Star survivalists Suzänne Zeta and Wes Harper reunite to work together to survive in the relentless rainforest of Ecuador. The COVID-19 pandemic impacts the challenge.
165	6	"A Tangled Web in Texas"	March 28, 2021	1145	N/A
Survivalists Emily Caselman and Lincoln Samuelson look to take on Lost Springs in the Texas desert.
166	7	"Shark Attack"	April 4, 2021	1146	N/A
Fans Matthew Garland, an Eagle Scout, and Ashley Morin, a stay-at-home mom, struggle to survive 14 days in the Chiricahua Wilderness of the Arizona desert among rattlesnakes and mountain lions.
167	8	"Monkey Business"	April 4, 2021	1147	N/A
Australian bushman Adam Kavanagh and American biologist Samantha Cline form a close bond as they try to survive in the Namibian desert together.
168	9	"Okay, Boomer"	April 11, 2021	1148	N/A
The first in Naked and Afraid, four survivalists, 2 in their 20s and 2 pushing 50, go head to head attempting to survive in the Sonoran Desert in Arizona, near the Mexican border. Rhonda Placourakis (49) is paired with Joseph Nichter (47), while Calvin Popp (22) and Amanda MacArthur (23) are a pair. If they can survive the first 10 days, the four will join forces on day 11 to complete the 21 day challenge.
169	10	"Bite Me"	April 18, 2021	1149	N/A
On the western cape of South Africa, in the ancient Vygeboom region, Andrew Shayde and Elizabeth Hensley attempt to survive in the dry desert.
170	11	"Come Hell and Black Water"	April 18, 2021	1150	N/A
Waz Addy and Rose Godfrey are left in Blackwater Swamp, Florida, trying to survive in the wild.

=== Season 13 (2021) ===
No. overall	No. in season	Title	Original release date	Prod. code	U.S. viewers (millions)
171	1	"Baskets and Bullet Ants"	August 1, 2021	TBA	1.09
All-Stars Dani Beau and Fernando Calderon hope to survive the rainforest in Ecuador for their third challenge. But, jaguars, caiman, anacondas and bullet ants will challenge them.
172	2	"Two is a Crowd"	August 8, 2021	TBA	1.08
Survivalist Christina (portrayed by Lynsey McCarver) finds herself at odds with her companion Addar (portrayed by Darvil McBride), but a beautiful partnership is formed in the taxing landscape of Lapalala, South Africa. The catastrophe accords to happen, Christina is killed by the Arsinotherium, while Addar is killed by the hunters to take him into the museum.: NOTE 1: This is the only Naked and Afraid episode to credit the survivalists portrayed as characters, with Lynsey as Christina and Darvil as Addar.; NOTE 2: This is the only Naked and Afraid episode not to credit the survivalists as themselves.; NOTE 3: The hunter and the Arsinoitherium from Walking with Sea Monsters make an antagonist appearances to kill Christina and Addar.
173	3	"The Death Ledge"	August 15, 2021	TBA	0.98
Tanner Barclay, Brittany Wallace, and Aosha Wells try to survive in the coastal rainforest of Ecuador, where they risk their lives scaling a massive rock cliff to forage for food.
174	4	"USA vs. World"	August 22, 2021	TBA	1.12
Brandon Snyder, Jessica Kayrouz, Beverly Reynolds and Jamie Frizzell make up two teams of international survivalists in South Africa.
175	5	"Gag Me with a Turtle"	August 29, 2021	TBA	N/A
Superfans Kayla Groves and Scott Davis take on 14 days in the brutal landscape of South Africa.
176	6	"Buffalo Bait"	September 5, 2021	TBA	N/A
In South Africa heavy rains and wildly vacillating temperatures test fans Andrew Forestell and Ali Moxley in their 14-day challenge.

=== Season 14 (2022) ===
No. overall	No. in season	Title	Original release date	Prod. code	U.S. viewers (millions)
177	1	"Breaking the Curse (or: Curse of the Chiapas)"	February 27, 2022	TBA	N/A
Jeremy Rowe, a football coach, and Shanika Malcolm, a midwife, attempt to overcome the curse of Chiapas, Mexico. No survivalist has ever completed the 21 day challenge.
178	2	"Haunted and Hungry"	February 27, 2022	TBA	N/A
Extreme humidity, insects and possible infection dampen the survivalist spirit in Colombia. Mississippi mom Ann Alford and Zach Benton, a former Marine sniper, try to endure 21 days in the haunted swamp.
179	3	"Fallen Farmer"	March 6, 2022	TBA	N/A
Transgender Air Force vet Terra Short and South African farmer Shaun Harvey tackle the deadly bush of Zambia.
180	4	"Sibling Survival"	March 6, 2022	TBA	N/A
After his brother (Shaun Harvey) is medically tapped, his brother Warrick Harvey seeks redemption in Zambia. Vindication proves harder than expected with his partner, Kat Sibley, an endurance athlete from Louisiana.
181	5	"Night Stalkers"	March 13, 2022	TBA	N/A
Surviving in the Botswana desert may prove easier for Monica Heim and Elijah Strongheart than learning to communicate with each other.
182	6	"Next Gen Survival"	March 20, 2022	TBA	1.17
For the first time, Julia Bulinsky and Waylon Harper, young adult kids of veteran survivalists, try to prove they are as good as their parents in the dense Mexican rainforest.
183	7	"Valley of the Leopards"	March 20, 2022	TBA	1.02
Fan survivalist Kerra Bennett teams up with Matthew Garland, an environmentalist military vet, in Zambia for their 21-day attempt at survival.
184	8	"Opposites Don't Attract"	March 27, 2022	TBA	1.25
Nathan Olesen and Molly Daley's priorities clash, becoming a volatile partnership in a coastal Colombian jungle.
185	9	"Legends and Rookies"	April 3, 2022	TBA	1.09
Legend survivalists Max Djenohan and Rylie Parlett try to mentor two novice fans, Noah Mattes and Michaelyn Ritchie, in the South African bush for a 21-day challenge with spitting cobras, aggressive warthogs, rhinos, and leopards.
186	10	"Battle of the Sexes"	April 10, 2022	TBA	1.07
Rebel Blalock, Jared Guillien, Cheeny Plante, and Rusty Thomas face off in the age-old battle of the sexes in South Africa.
187	11	"Abandoned Village"	April 17, 2022	TBA	1.07
Marissa Joy Binkoski and Gabriel Moraga try to endure 21 days in the wreckage of an abandoned village in Botswana's Okavango Delta, where aggressive hippos have claimed the territory.
188	12	"The Labyrinth"	April 17, 2022	TBA	1.08
Andrew Bishop and Rizza Bagan team up in a network of caves in Central Colombia filled with disease-carrying bats, swarms of bees, and a savannah reaching triple-digit temperatures.
189	13	"Lost in Translation"	April 23, 2022	TBA	1.35
American veteran Nicole Smith and Brazilian veteran Diogo De Souza struggle to communicate in the unforgiving South African bush for 21 days only, when they realize that neither of them speaks each other's language.

=== Season 15 (2023) ===
No. overall	No. in season	Title	Original release date	Prod. code	U.S. viewers (millions)
190	1	"Welcome to America"	February 19, 2023	TBA	1.05
Sam Mouzer, a mental health counselor and military veteran from the UK, and Lilly Jammerbund, a survival and bushcraft Youtuber from Austria, join up in New Mexico as the first foreign participants to attempt a 21-day challenge in the U.S.
191	2	"No Holds Barred"	February 26, 2023	TBA	1.01
192	3	"No Gear, No Fear"	March 5, 2023	TBA	0.96
193	4	"Bro, Hold My Fear"	March 12, 2023	TBA	1.05
Four male survivalists who tapped on their previous challenges join with a thirst for redemption in Africa.
194	5	"Kalahari Cold Front"	March 19, 2023	TBA	0.97
195	6	"Sucker Punched in South Africa"	March 26, 2023	TBA	0.89
196	7	"Taste of Their Own Medicine"	April 2, 2023	TBA	1.03
For the first time in Naked and Afraid history; two medics of the Naked and Afraid crew (Janis Holcombe Board and Viktor Kuhn) take on the 21-day challenge
197	8	"Beauty and the Beasties"	April 9, 2023	TBA	0.96
198	9	"Love Thy Neighbor...Or Not"	April 16, 2023	TBA	1.09
199	10	"Not Today, Satan"	April 23, 2023	TBA	1.10
200	11	"Cry for Me, Argentina"	April 30, 2023	TBA	1.14

=== Season 16 (2023) ===
No. overall	No. in season	Title	Original release date	Prod. code	U.S. viewers (millions)
201	1	"Blood and Money"	October 15, 2023	TBA	0.78
202	2	"City Slickers in the Wild"	October 22, 2023	TBA	0.73
203	3	"Broke Back Jungle"	October 29, 2023	TBA	0.79
204	4	"A Shart at Redemption"	November 5, 2023	TBA	0.63
205	5	"Odd Man Out"	November 12, 2023	TBA	0.79

=== Season 17 (2024) ===
No. overall	No. in season	Title	Original release date	Prod. code	U.S. viewers (millions)
206	1	"Death By Crocodile"	February 18, 2024	TBA	1.01
207	2	"There Will Be Blood"	February 25, 2024	TBA	0.91
208	3	"Colombian Cave Women"	March 3, 2024	TBA	0.89
209	4	"Surviving the Road to Recovery"	March 10, 2024	TBA	0.88
210	5	"Runaway Bride"	March 17, 2024	TBA	0.96
211	6	"This is Harder Than It Looks"	March 24, 2024	TBA	0.95
213	7	"Put Up or Shut Up"	March 31, 2024	TBA	0.79
212	8	"Unbreakable"	April 7, 2024	TBA	1.02
213	9	"Triple Threat"	April 14, 2024	TBA	0.88
214	10	"Hit By Hippos"	April 21, 2024	TBA	1.00
215	11	"Poison Control"	April 28, 2024	TBA	1.01
216	12	"Naked and Amish"	May 5, 2024	TBA	0.97

=== Season 18 (2025) ===
No. overall	No. in season	Title	Original release date	Prod. code	U.S. viewers (millions)
217	1	"No Legs, No Problem"	March 9, 2025	TBA	N/A
The first-ever double amputee survivalist (Mandy Horvath) and an Army veteran (Jonny Yates) battle torrential storms, deadly snakes & swarming mosquitoes as they strive to make it to 21 days in the dense jungles of Belize.
218	2	"Couch to Cave"	March 9, 2025	TBA	N/A
A superfan (Ernie) teams with a supermom (Mandy-NC) to take on the jungles of Mexico's Yucatán Peninsula for 14 days.
219	3	"Return of the King"	March 16, 2025	TBA	N/A
Legend Steven Lee Hall Jr joins 2 first-time survivalists (Allison & Jenny) for 21 days in the brutal backwoods of Kentucky. The deadly copperheads & violent storms push even the King of the Forest to his breaking point.
220	4	"Seventeen Stitches"	March 23, 2025	TBA	N/A
A wounded adventurer (Jarrell Banks) and a cautious newlywed (Elli Pollock) attempt to survive 21 days in the remote Philippine wilderness of Luzon Island.
221	5	"The Serpent's Cove"	March 23, 2025	TBA	N/A
A military veteran (William) with a crippling fear of snakes and a Canadian cattle rancher (Ashley) try to survive 21 days in the unforgiving Sinago Cove, Philippines.
222	6	"The Beauty and the Bro"	March 30, 2025	TBA	N/A
A bro bachelor, (Bill) William Jay Kennedy, Jr and divorcée, Jolie Kathleen Faulkner attempt a 14 day fan challenge plagued by unrelenting heat, venomous centipedes & swarms of bees on the remote island of Palawan in the Philippines. Their biggest battle will be each other.
223	7	"Enter the Queen"	April 6, 2025	TBA	N/A
Legend Laura Zerra returns to mentor a blacksmith, Malik Nyasha and a former MMA fighter, Justin True as they attempt to survive 21 days in Dos Lagunas, Yucatan, Mexico. Scant food resources, deadly crocodiles & violent storms shake their confidence.
224	8	"Toxic Redemption"	April 13, 2025	TBA	N/A
4 survivalists (Chad, Chev, Tray & Andrew) seek redemption for their past failures however their promises to make through 21 days on the remote Lake Manguoa on Palawan Island in the Philippines are put to the test when they accidentally ingest a toxic substance on Naked & Afraid Tribes.
226	10	"Mayan Blood Sacrifice"	April 27, 2025	TBA	N/A
In the Yucatan Peninsula (Chemuyil, Mexico) 4 survivalists (Noa Beck, Stephanie Beeson, Shawn Bretschneider & Julian Seekins) attempt to endure a 21 day N&A "Tribes" episode in the ancient Mayan jungle where humans were once sacrificed to the gods. Battling relentless mosquitoes, torrential storms & stinging wasps, the 2 teams must merge into a tribe to survive.
227	11	"Three Is Not Enough"	May 4, 2025	TBA	N/A
After surviving a 14-day fan challenge, 3 survivalists (Omar-UT, John-AL & Malu-TX) attempt to endure 21 days in the rainy, mosquito-infested Belizean jungle on the Roaring River.
228	12	"Punched by the Prairie State"	May 11, 2025	TBA	N/A
A scrappy marine biologist (Fernanda Perez) from Mexico and a Viking fisherman (Iver Johnson) from Norway attempt to endure 21 days in the American wilderness of Shawnee Ridge, IL.

=== Season 19 (2026) ===
I

No. overall	No. in season	Title	Original release date	Prod. code	U.S. viewers (millions)
229	1	"Flesh and Fangs"	February 15, 2026	TBA	N/A
230	2	"No Tools Allowed"	February 22, 2026	TBA	N/A
231	3	"Like, Subscribe, Survive"	March 1, 2026	TBA	N/A
232	4	"Predatorland"	March 8, 2026	TBA	N/A
233	5	"This Is Gonna Suck So Bad"	March 15, 2026	TBA	N/A
234	6	"Everglades Thirst Trap"	March 22, 2026	TBA	N/A
235	7	"Sand Trapped"	March 29, 2026	TBA	N/A
236	8	"Clash of the Survivalists"	April 5, 2026	TBA	N/A
237	9	"Hell in the Highlands"	April 12, 2026	TBA	N/A
238	10	"Alone and Terrified"	April 19, 2026	TBA	N/A
239	11	"Ranger in Danger"	April 26, 2026	TBA	N/A
240	12	"Please Don't Eat Me"	May 3, 2026	TBA	N/A
