= Skullcrusher (disambiguation) =

Skullcrusher is an American musician.

Skullcrusher or skull crusher may also refer to:

- EJ Snyder (born 1965), American survivalist and television personality, nicknamed “Skullcrusher”
- "Skullcrusher", a song by American heavy metal band Biohazard from their album Reborn in Defiance
- "Skull crusher", another name for lying triceps extensions
- A model of headphone made by Skullcandy
