= Ky Furneaux =

Australian TV host (born 1973)

- Born: 29 October 1973 (age 52); Adelaide, South Australia, Australia
- Years active: 2000–present

Kylie "Ky" Furneaux (born 29 October 1973) is an Australian outdoor guide, TV host, survival expert and stunt person who has appeared in over 100 films and TV productions.

== Early life ==
Furneaux was born Kylie Anne Burford in Adelaide, Australia. Her parents, Peter and Loy Burford, are both retired teachers. Furneaux is the younger of two children. Her older sister Shauna is a business consultant.

At 19, Furneaux was involved in a car accident that left her bedridden with a fractured spine. Her doctor speculated that she would have limited mobility for the rest of her life. However, after a year of intense physical therapy, Furneaux was active again, and decided to channel her love of nature into being an outdoor team leader for Venture Corporate Recharge in Australia.She hunts goats with a bow and arrow for fun

Furneaux worked with Venture for over seven years, leading groups in climbing, rappelling, high ropes, sailing, kayaking, canoeing, and hiking. She also has a degree in business.

== Career ==
In 1999, a visit to her sister Shauna in Vancouver, British Columbia, Canada, ignited Furneaux's interest in changing careers. She relocated to Vancouver and began training in martial arts, gymnastics, stunt driving, and high falls to pursue her new career in stunt work. Her first stunt job was in the TV show Andromeda, but her big break came when she was hired to do stunts for Sharon Stone in Catwoman.

Since 2000, Furneaux has worked steadily in TV and films, including regular stunt work for Jaimie Alexander. Originally working together in Kyle XY, they can currently be seen on NBC's hit show Blindspot. For her work in Thor as Jaimie Alexander's stunt double, Ky was awarded the Taurus Stunt Award (the Oscars of the stunt industry) in 2012 for Best Female Stunt Performer in the world.

Some of Furneaux's recent projects include Agents of S.H.I.E.L.D., The Bridge and Sons of Anarchy. Other notable Hollywood names she has doubled for include Anne Hathaway, Jennifer Garner and Camilla Belle.

Furneaux has also branched into hosting, returning to her survival roots to produce and co-host Hike for Survival, an epic 100-mile trek spanning the Sierra Nevada. Furneaux and her co-host carried only a pocket knife as they crossed the mountains. Other projects featuring Furneaux include The World Out There and MTV’s Made, in which Furneaux coached a teenager who wanted to learn outdoor survival skills. Furneaux has also been featured on the Discovery Channel's hit show Naked and Afraid; in the episode Beware the Bayou.

In March 2014, Furneaux's first book debuted. Published by Penguin Australia, Girl’s Own Survival Guide is a fun read for women to help them be proactive in any situation, from a broken stiletto to foraging for food in the wilderness. The U.S. titled The Superwoman’s Survival Guide, was released in April 2014.

== Filmography ==
- Blindspot (2015)
- The Bridge (2014)
- The Purge: Anarchy (2014)
- Agents of S.H.I.E.L.D. (2014)
- The Last Stand (2013)
- The Avengers (2012)
- Pirates of the Caribbean: On Stranger Tides (2011)
- Thor (2011)
- Tron: Legacy (2010)
- Hard Ride to Hell (2010)
- 2012 (2009)
- SGU Stargate Universe (2009)
- Scooby-Doo! The Mystery Begins (2009)
- The Imaginarium of Doctor Parnassus (2009)
- Kyle XY (2009)
- United States of Tara (2009)
- Push (2009)
- Inseparable (2008)
- Passengers (2008)
- Hancock (2008)
- 15-40 (short) (2008)
- Stargate: Atlantis (2007)
- The Passage (2007)
- My Name Is Sarah (2007)
- Whisper (2007)
- The Last Trimester (2006)
- Catch and Release (2006)
- Blade: The Series (2006)
- The 4400
- Snakes on a Plane (2006)
- Fallen (2006)
- The Obsession (2006)
- X-Men: The Last Stand (2006)
- Hunters (2006)
- BloodRayne (2005)
- Secret Lives (2005)
- Fantastic Four (2005)
- Murder at the Presidio (2005)
- Fatal Reunion (2005)
- Alone in the Dark (2005)
- Elektra (2005)
- Chestnut: Hero of Central Park (2004)
- Life As We Know It (2004)
- The Mountain (2004)
- Catwoman (2004)
- White Chicks (2004)
- Monster Island (2004)
- Dead Like Me (2003)
- Smallville (2001)
- Andromeda (2000)
