= Manu Toigo =

Australian television personality

- Occupation: Survivalist
- Known for: Survival; TV Star; Environmental Activism
- Television: Naked and Afraid; Naked and Afraid XL; Curiosity; Mygrations; TMZ
- Website: manutoigo.com

Manu Toigo is a survivalist from Queensland, Australia, who was featured on Discovery Channel's TV show Naked and Afraid and Curiosity.

== Early life ==
Manu was born in Queensland and lived on her parents' farm. At the age of 17 she joined the Infantry Reserve Unit in the Australian Army and served for eight years until she sustained an injury. In 1998 Manu moved to Seattle, where she graduated from college.

== TV appearances ==
=== Discovery's Curiosity ===
Manu appeared on the Discovery Channel series Curiosity during the "I, Caveman" episode which aired on October 2, 2011.

=== Naked and Afraid ===
In 2013, Manu was featured on the second season of Discovery Channel's Naked and Afraid for a special double episode titled "Double Jeopardy" which took place in the Panama Jungle. The episode premiered on December 10, 2013, and attracted 2.4 million viewers. Manu made it through the 21 day challenge but contracted dengue fever from a mosquito bite and went to the hospital three days after she finished the challenge. Manu said that she got to the hospital just in time — any later and she might have died. Manu spent a total of two weeks in the hospital and several months in physical therapy. She finished with a Primitive Survival Rating (PSR) of 8.0.

In 2019, Manu returned to the Naked and Afraid series as she was cast with 14 other survivalists for Naked and Afraid XL. For this challenge, the survivalists had to survive 40 days in the Palawan in the Philippines. Manu was partnered in a group with Rylie Parlett and Christina McQueen, but tapped out on Day 7 due to her brother receiving treatments for jaw cancer.

=== Mygrations ===
Manu appeared on National Geographic's show Mygrations in 2016. The National Geographic team originally contacted Manu via Twitter and asked her if she would like to be featured in the show. Manu said she enjoyed being on the show, but commented on the show's large production, which took much of the wilderness experience away from her.

== Other projects ==
Manu currently runs a wilderness camp in California to educate youth about the environment called camp Manu. She also runs an organization called Walk-about that gives survival tips and tells people how to respect the environment. The organization is partnered with Leave No Trace and Women Owned. On November 9, 2019, Manu released a song titled "Plastic Solution" with Two Roads Plastic Project. 100% of the song profits will go to efforts in fighting against plastic pollution.
