= Anastasia Ashley =

American professional surfer and model

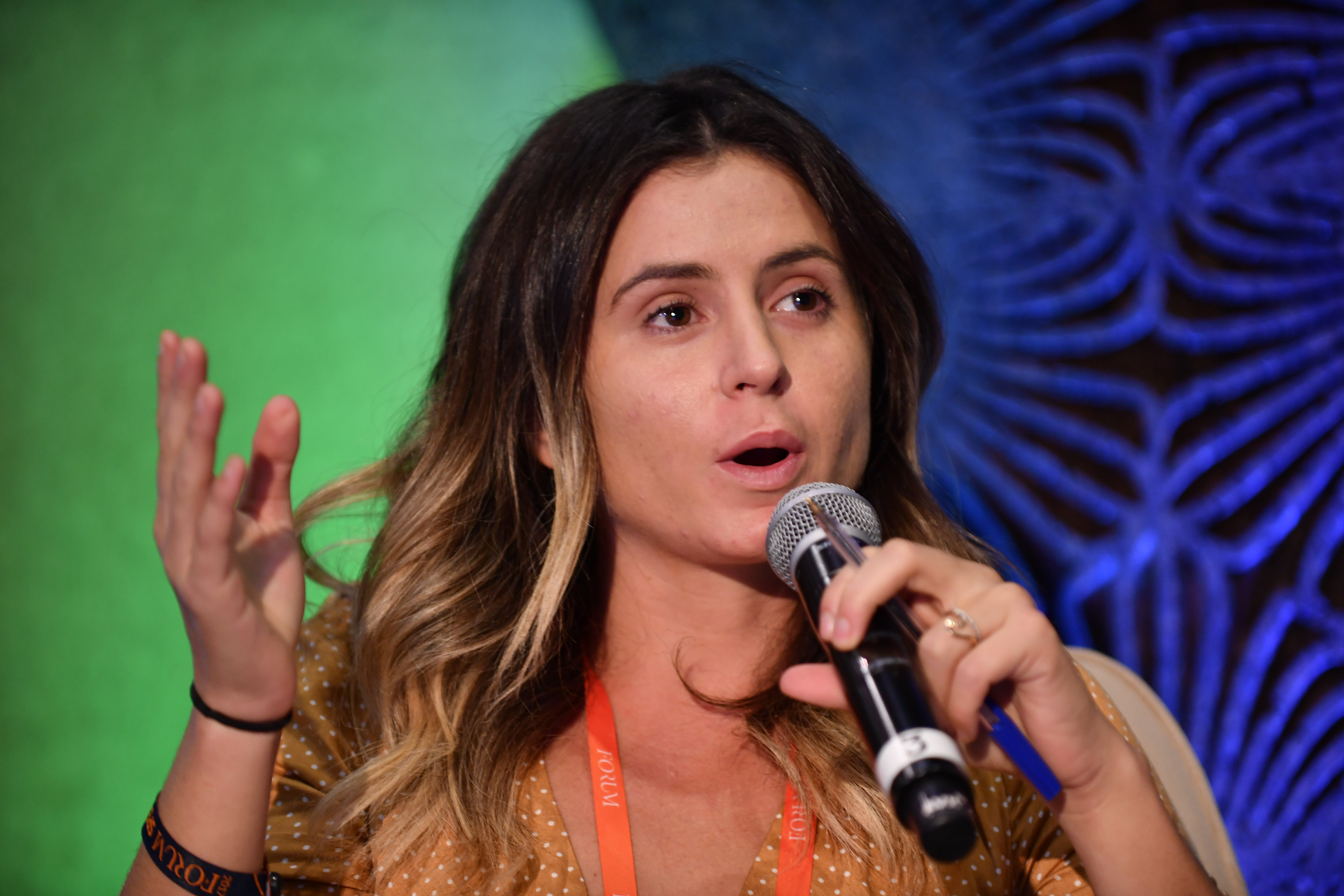
- Ashley at Web Summit 2017

Personal information
- Born: February 10, 1987 (age 39) San Clemente, California, U.S.A.
- Height: 5 ft 8 in (1.73 m)
- Website: anastasiaashley.com

Surfing career
- Sport: Surfing

Surfing specifications
- Stance: Regular Foot
- Favorite waves: Keramas, Bali

Anastasia Electra Ashley (born February 10, 1987) is an American professional surfer and model.

== Early life ==
Ashley was born in San Clemente, California on February 10, 1987. She began surfing at the age of 5 right before moving to Hawaii. At the age of 6, she won a surf contest using a run-down board that she found in a trash can outside of her house. By the age of 7, she picked up a sponsor to replace her run-down board with new ones.

== Career ==
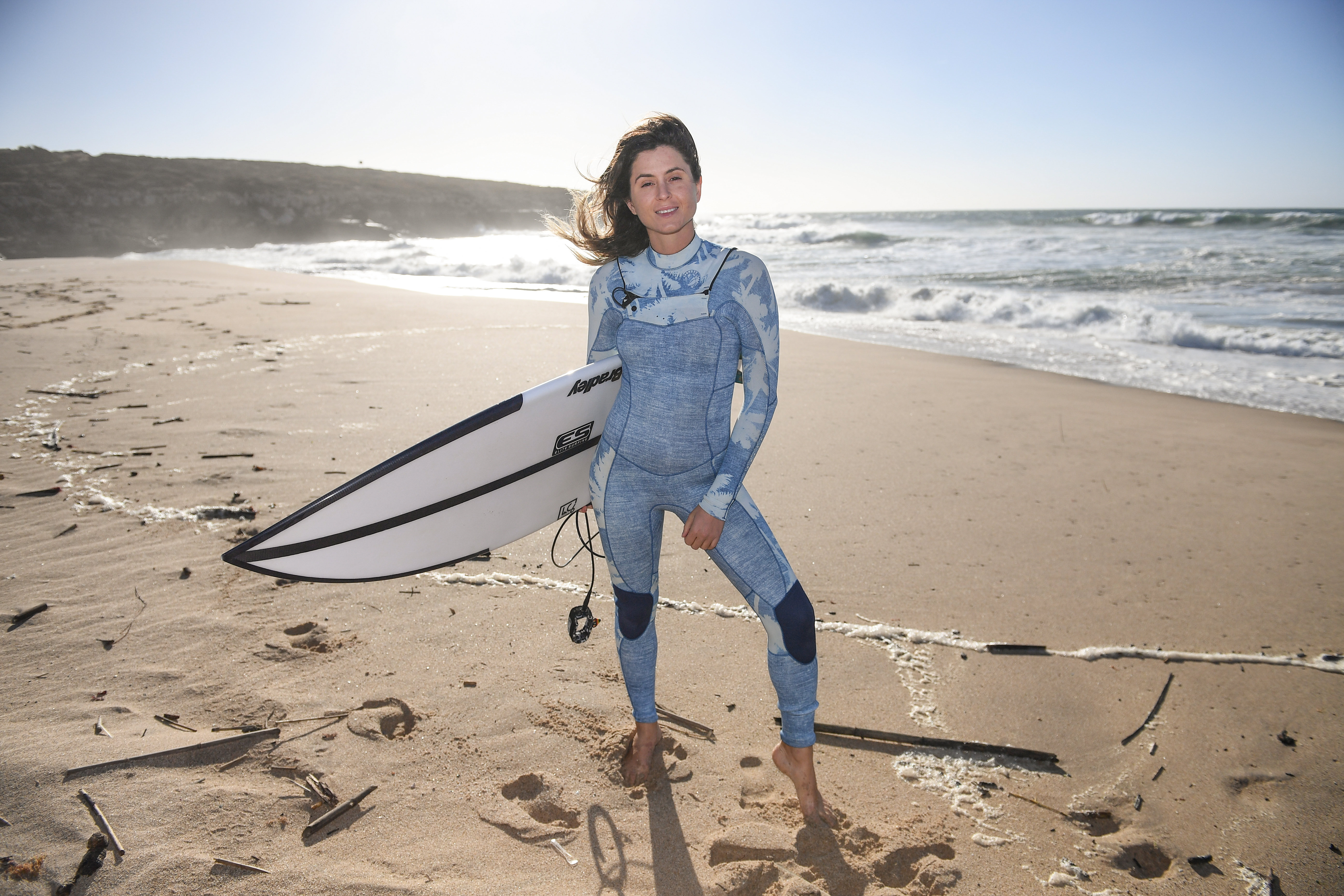
Ashley at Surf Summit, prior to Web Summit 2017, in Ericeira, Portugal

In 2003, she received the Triple Crown Rookie of the Year award. At the age of 16, Ashley won her first major national title. Later, she also won titles including two National Scholastic Surfing Association championships and the Professional Surfing Tour of America championship. Ashley won the 2010 Pipeline Women's Pro in Hawaii. She appeared in the Sports Illustrated Swimsuit Edition in 2014. As of September 8, 2014, Ashley is ranked 59th in the 2014 Women's Qualification Series.

In September 2014, she started her own Gypsy Jet Set jewelry line in collaboration with OK1984, a jewelry company. She was featured in the October 2014 issue of Maxim magazine. In November 2014, she went to Ireland for a Web Summit on how to maintain a competitive edge in surfing with a focus on social media tools. Ashley was interested in convincing Taoiseach Enda Kenny to surf.

Ashley appeared on Hell's Kitchen in the third episode of Season 14 where she taught the team challenge winners how to surf. She also attended as a dining room guest in that episode's dinner service.

== Personal life ==
Ashley is reported to have been a vegetarian in the past. However, in 2017, she was a survivalist in the TV show Naked and Afraid, where she was seen eating fish.
