= Nudity in American television =

Depictions of nudity

Nudity in American television is a controversial topic. Aside from a few exceptions, nudity in the United States has traditionally not been shown on terrestrial television. On the other hand, cable television has been much less constrained as far as nudity is concerned.

== History ==
In 1969, MGM Television filmed a scene for the pilot of the TV show Then Came Bronson where Bonnie Bedelia (who later appeared in Die Hard) appears topless. NBC aired the pilot with the nude scene cut, but a complete version was released to theaters in 1970.

In May 1973, twenty-four PBS stations broadcast their self-produced TV movie Steambath (based on the play of the same name) with Valerie Perrine appearing naked. The following year in 1974, PBS's KERA-TV in Dallas, Texas began broadcasting the British sketch comedy show Monty Python's Flying Circus with actress Sheila Sands appearing topless in the 6th episode.

In 1974, Columbia Pictures Television filmed a nude scene of Connie Stevens for a TV movie called The Sex Symbol. It aired on ABC in September with the nude scene cut, but was marketed overseas in an uncensored version.

In 1975 (with a rerun in 1986), the PBS National Geographic special The Incredible Machine explored the working of the human body. Its opening scenes included a nude female artist's model, though the special was likely more notable for its innovative use of microcinematography and interior cinematography. For more than five years afterwards, it remained the most watched single program in the network's history.

In 1976, the CBS sitcom All in the Family originally aired an episode in which Archie Bunker was babysitting his 3-week-old grandson, Joey Stivic. In one scene where Archie changed the baby's diaper, the boy's genitals were briefly shown. Reruns of the episode were later edited and did not represent the nudity.

In October 1976, the ABC show Charlie's Angels aired an episode Angels in Chains, in which Farrah Fawcett-Majors briefly flashed one bare breast as the Angels crossed a stream.

In November 1977, PBS's Masterpiece Theatre broadcast BBC's I, Claudius series with its nude scenes intact. Tim Harvey would later win an Emmy for his production design work on the original series the following year.

On a 1978 episode of The Gong Show, regular panelist Jaye P. Morgan flashed her breasts during the skit "Gene, Gene, the dancing machine." NBC banned her from the program following the incident.

The special-event miniseries, Roots on ABC, featured some partial nudity of its cast, usually fleetingly, but more so than other commercial network programming in the United States in the 1970s.

In 1985, the two-night adaptation of Ken Follett's The Key to Rebecca, shown on WPIX Channel 11 in New York City on April 29 and May 9, had non-pixelated toplessness from both of its female stars, Season Hubley and Lina Raymond.

The Public Broadcasting Service was an early broadcaster of female nudity on American television. In 1973, PBS aired "Steambath" starring Valerie Perrine, whose nude scene is widely regarded as the first intentional female nudity on U.S. television.

Throughout the United States, many metropolitan areas had independent television stations that were not affiliated with any of the national networks and showed programming only to people within their limited broadcast range. During the 1980s, many of these stations experimented with content containing frontal female nudity in movies during prime time. KTLA in Los Angeles, for example, showed an unedited version of the Academy Award-winning One Flew Over the Cuckoo's Nest, which featured fully exposed female breasts, between 7:30 and 11 p.m. The channel began the time slot with a video of director Miloš Forman stating that the film was too controversial to be allowed a faithful television broadcast (NBC's earlier broadcast had cut the film to fit the two hours format with commercials), but that KTLA believed that the culture had changed such that a complete broadcast would be tolerated and appreciated. Then, it was followed by a disclaimer that was repeated after each commercial break.

From the early 1990s until the early 2000s, some prime time series (such as ABC's NYPD Blue and Once and Again, CBS's CSI: Crime Scene Investigation and Chicago Hope and Fox's John Doe) experimented with nudity. NYPD Blue is noteworthy for featuring nudity in the context of people engaging in sexual activity. While fully exposed female breasts were never shown, the show often depicted full back nudity of men and women.

In 1997, NBC broadcast an unedited version of Steven Spielberg's Holocaust film Schindler's List in prime time. The film features brief full-frontal nudity of both sexes in non-sexual contexts. Then-Congressman Tom Coburn criticized NBC's airing of the film for its nudity, violence and profanity. Both Democrats and Coburn's fellow Republicans criticized Coburn for his reaction, and defended the film and NBC's choice to air it in full. Coburn subsequently apologized for his reaction.

In 2013, Buying Naked premiered on TLC that the real estate agent Jackie Youngblood shows homes in clothing optional communities to house-hunting nudists.

In 2014, Dating Naked is an American reality series dating game show shown on VH1 the series debuted in July 2014, and ran through 2016.

== Recent ==
After Justin Timberlake exposed Janet Jackson's breast during a live performance at the 2004 Super Bowl halftime show the Federal Communications Commission (FCC) tightened its indecency rules due to public pressure.

As a consequence of the public and media reaction to the incident, major networks edited some of their shows. CBS removed a shot of a naked man from Without a Trace, while NBC deleted a two-second shot of an elderly woman's breast from ER. Subsequently, prime time television networks became more reluctant to show even non-explicit nudity in their TV shows. In the current climate, nudity is almost unknown on any broadcast television show — with the exception being animated series such as The Simpsons and Family Guy (which spoofed the conservative phase of American television in the episode "PTV").

Cable television, on the other hand, is not bound by FCC rules and can show whatever material their executives consider suitable. With some exceptions, while cable channels that rely on advertising still do not show nudity during prime time, nudity is often shown on premium cable channels such as Showtime, HBO and Turner Classic Movies (TCM). FX is one of the few commercial–dependent cable channels that features nudity in its programming (notably the controversial Nip/Tuck and American Horror Story). SundanceTV will allow nudity. Discovery and other documentary-related channels may show nudity in a journalistic context, such as that of indigenous peoples.

Naked and Afraid is an American reality series shown on the Discovery Channel. The fifth season premiered on March 13, 2016. Modelled on Dutch show Adam Zkt. Eva, the show matches up heterosexual contestants who are nude most of the time. The genitals of all participants along with the female breasts, and occasionally the buttocks, are blurred out. Each episode chronicles the lives of two survivalists (one female, one male) who meet for the first time and are given the task of surviving a stay in the wilderness naked for 21 days. The spin-off reality show Naked and Afraid XL is also on the Discovery Channel. Each season in the episodes that more survivalist(s) are giving the task of surviving the wilderness for 40 days. Again, the contestants' crotch area and the women's breasts are blurred out.

In recent years, a number of cable stations in the United States have begun to air R-rated films uncensored. They include Deadpool and The Wolf of Wall Street airing on FX.

== See also ==
- Depictions of nudity
- Nudity and sexuality
- Nudity in film
- Sex in advertising
- Sex in film
- Sex and sexuality in speculative fiction
- Super Bowl XXXVIII halftime show controversy
- Wardrobe malfunction
