= West Nalaut Island =

Island in northern Palawan, in the Philippines

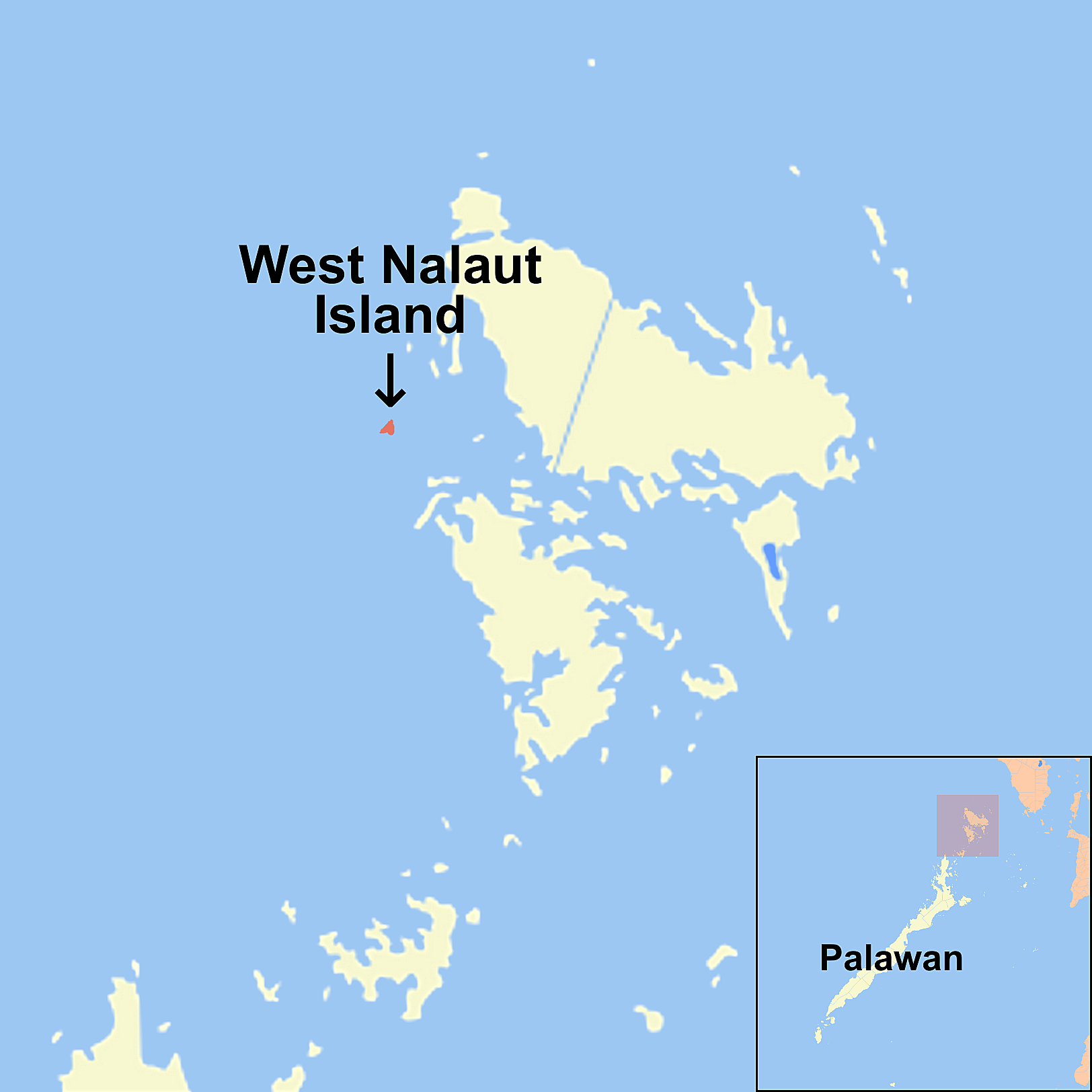
- Map of northern Palawan locating the island

- Location within Philippines

Geography
- Coordinates: 12°3′17″N 119°47′24″E
- Archipelago: Calamian Group of Islands
- Adjacent to: South China Sea

Administration
- Philippines
- Region: Mimaropa
- Province: Palawan

Additional information

West Nalaut Island is an island in northern Palawan, in the Philippines. It is the westernmost of the Calamian Islands, and can form a guide to shipping entering the Coron West Passage. It is approximately 16 kilometres (9.9 mi) off the western coast of Busuanga Island, which is approximately a 40-minute flight from Manila. The uninhabited 47.9-hectare (0.479 km^{2}) island is privately owned. It was attempted to be sold as part of the HGTV show "Island Hunters".

West Nalaut Island has a 1.1 kilometres (0.68 mi) crescent–shaped white sand beach, 3.3 kilometres (2.1 mi) of coastline, several smaller beach coves, 80-metre (260 ft)-high cliffs, and rainforest coverage. It is a 30-minute speedboat journey from 12 World War II wreck dives and local towns.

The asking price in 2022 was USD ~7m. The island was used in the Million Dollar Island TV series.

== See also ==
- Busuanga, Palawan
- Coron, Palawan
- Culion, Palawan
- List of islands of the Philippines
