= EJ Snyder =

American survivalist and television personality

- Born: December 3, 1965 (age 59); Englewood, New Jersey, US
- Other names: Skullcrusher
- Occupations: Survivalist; television personality
- Awards: Legion of Merit; Bronze Star Medal (2)

Errol James "EJ" Snyder, Jr. (born December 3, 1965) is an American survivalist and television personality.

== Biography ==
EJ Snyder was born in Englewood, New Jersey. Following the divorce of his parents around 1975, he and his brother Jeff were brought up by their mother. He grew up in North Jersey, where he experienced childhood bullying; this caused him to become interested in strength training and self-defense.

Snyder joined the United States Army when he was 19 years old. In 1991, he fought in the Gulf War, and in 2004, the Iraq War. During his career, he was awarded two Bronze Stars as well as the Legion of Merit. He received the nickname “Skullcrusher” as a drill sergeant. He also taught at the Florida Ranger Camp and the Special Warfare Center located in Fort Bragg. He retired in 2009 when he was a sergeant major. He currently lives in Fayetteville, North Carolina.

== Entertainment career ==
Snyder first appeared on television on the show Lost, portraying Redfern. In 2009 he appeared on the documentary series Patton 360° as himself.

On 7 July 2013, Snyder appeared on Naked and Afraid for the first time; paired with partner Kellie Nightlinger, the two survived for three weeks in Tanzania. Later in the same year, he was cast on 72 Hours and competed for $100,000 in the Fijian jungle. He went on to appear on Naked and Afraid for the second time in the episode “Man vs. Amazon”. In this episode he became the first man to successfully complete two challenges.

On 12 July 2015, Snyder was on the first season of Naked and Afraid XL. He was accompanied by eleven other survivalists.

In 2016, Snyder hosted the ninth season of Dual Survival alongside fellow Naked and Afraid contestant Jeff Zausch. Snyder also took the leading role of Max in Survival T.V. The Movie!.

In 2021, he competed on Naked and Afraid XL´s 7th season again in the Atchafalaya Basin of Louisiana. During the season, Snyder sustained lacerations to his scrotum after falling from a tree, requiring eight stitches. The show's medical team found that the cut had not become infected and allowed him to continue the 60-day challenge.

In 2022, he appeared on Naked and Afraid XL Season 8 in the Amazon; he was not a contestant, but a mentor yet underwent all the challenges as the regular contestants.

=== Filmography ===
List of appearances in film and television
Year	Title	Role	Notes
2008	Forgetting Sarah Marshall	Tourist	Uncredited
2008	Lost	Redfern	5 episodes
2009	Patton 360°	Himself	
2013	Naked and Afraid	Himself	Contestant
2013	72 Hours	Himself	Contestant
2014	Naked and Afraid	Himself	Contestant
2015	Naked and Afraid XL	Himself	Contestant
2016	Dual Survival	Himself	
2016	Survival T.V. The Movie!	Max	
2021	Naked and Afraid XL	Himself	Contestant
