= Mendihuaca River =

River in Colombia

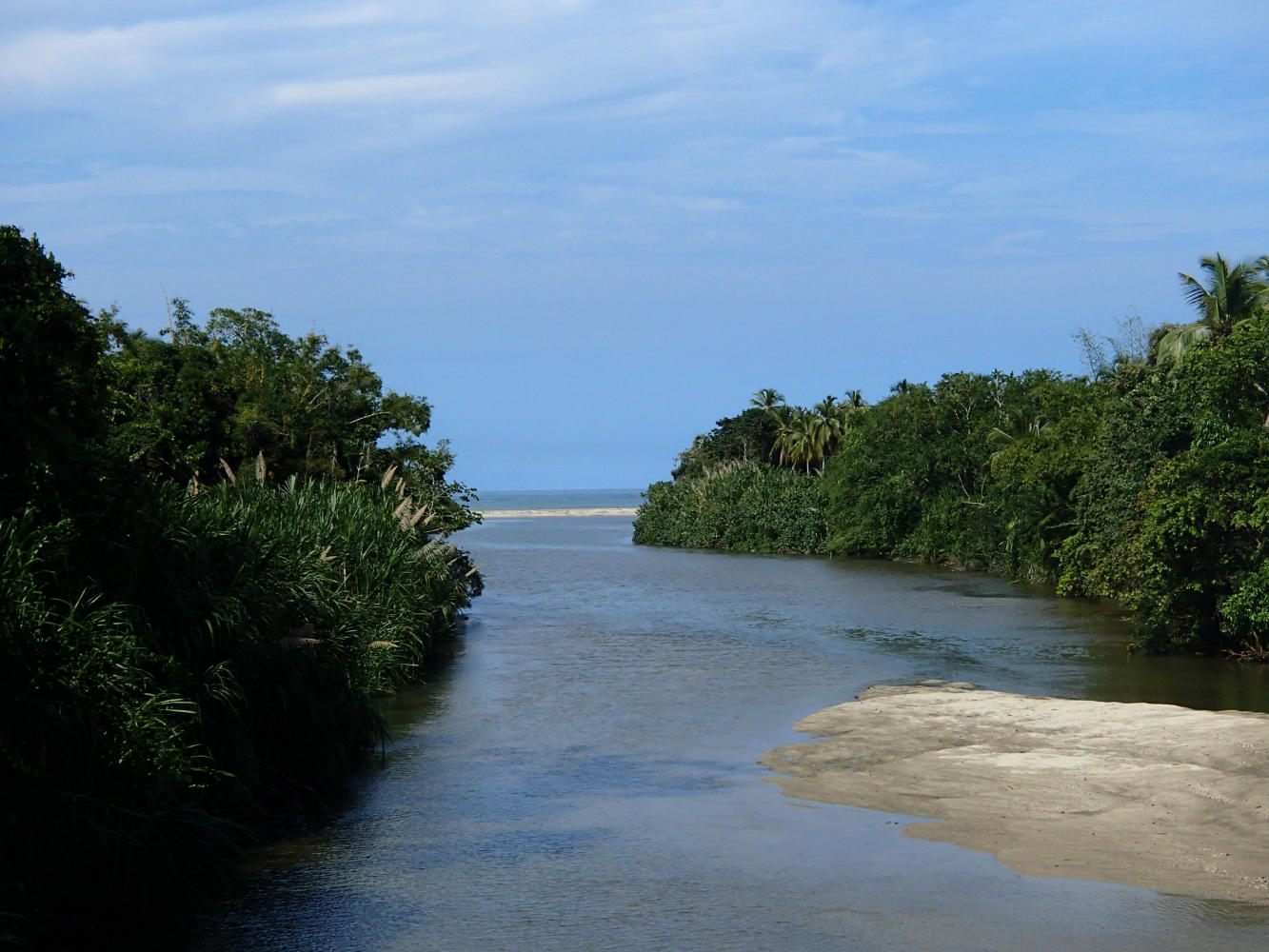
- The mouth of the Mendihuaca River

Location
- Country: Colombia

Physical characteristics
- Source: El Boquerón
  - location: Nevada de Santa Marta, Colombia
  - coordinates: 11°13′09″N 73°59′02″W
- Mouth: Caribbean Sea
  - location: Playas Mendihuaca, Magdalena, Colombia
  - coordinates: 11°16′30″N 73°51′32″W
  - elevation: 0 m (0 ft)
- Length: 12.6 km (7.8 mi)
- Basin size: 60 km^{2} (23 sq mi)
- Discharge
  - average: 2.5 m^{3}/s (88 cu ft/s)

The Mendihuaca River (Spanish: río Mendihuaca) is a river in northeastern Colombia that originates in the Sierra Nevada de Santa Marta mountain range and discharges into the Caribbean Sea. The watershed is considered threatened due to deforestation in the area near the river's source.
