= Naked and Afraid XL =

American reality television series

- Genre: Reality
- Country of origin: United States
- Original language: English
- No. of seasons: 9
- No. of episodes: 83

Production
- Executive producers: Sean Foley; Jim Morton; David Kirkwood; David Garfinkle; Jay Renfroe
- Running time: 120 minutes

Original release
- Network: Discovery Channel
- Release: July 12, 2015 – June 30, 2024

Related
- Naked and Afraid; Naked and Afraid Alone; Unsensored

Naked and Afraid XL is an American reality television series that premiered on the Discovery Channel in 2015.

This series is a spin-off of Naked and Afraid. A group of people are given the task of surviving in the wilderness for an extended period into a 40-day challenge, nineteen more days than the original series' 21-day challenge. The XL title plays as a visual pun for the title, as it also represents the Roman numeral for 40. Each survivalist is only allowed to bring one or two helpful items of their choosing. They are not given any other items, clothing, food, or water. The camera crews are not allowed to intervene, except for medical emergencies. Any member of the cast is allowed to withdraw at any time, meaning he or she decides not to continue with the task and goes home. The contestants hunt, trap, and gather their food in the wild and build shelters with their own hands and the available material found in the nature. At the end of the period, the remaining survivalist(s) must arrive at the designated extraction point. The success of this last task indicates their ability to survive in a harsh environment for a long period of time. No cash prize has been announced for successful XL participants.

== Episodes ==
=== Series overview ===
Season	Country/State	Episodes	Originally released	
Season	Country/State	Episodes	First released	Last released
1	Colombia	9	July 12, 2015	August 29, 2015
2	South Africa	9	July 3, 2016	September 1, 2016
3	Ecuador	9	April 16, 2017	June 25, 2017
4	South Africa	10	April 29, 2018	July 8, 2018
5	Philippines	9	May 26, 2019	July 27, 2019
6	South Africa	11	May 24, 2020	August 2, 2020
7	Louisiana	10	April 21, 2021	June 27, 2021
8	Peru	10	May 1, 2022	July 9, 2022
9	Montana	6	July 31, 2022	August 28, 2022
10	Colombia	8	May 12, 2024	June 30, 2024

=== Season 1 (2015) ===
The first season takes place in Colombia.

Location of Season 1 in Colombia

==== Participants ====
Survivalist	Prior Challenge(s)	Initial PSR	Notes
Alana Barfield	S2 - Fiji		
Danielle Beau	S4 - Colombia		
Honora Bowen	S3 - Brazil		Tapped out because she was exiled - Day 10
Chris Fischer	S3 - Dominica		
Hakim Isler	S3 - India		Tapped out due to severe cramps - Day 4
Dani Julien	S3 - Bahamas		Tapped out due to team issues - Day 34
Shane Lewis	S1 - Costa Rica		Tapped out due to fatigue - Day 30
Luke McLaughlin	S3 - Namibia		
Eva Rupert	S2 - Madagascar		
EJ Snyder	S1 - Tanzania; S2 - Amazon/Peru		
Jeff Zausch	S2 - Madagascar		
Laura Zerra	S1 - Panama; S2 - Amazon/Peru		

==== Episodes ====
No. overall	No. in season	Title	Original release date	Prod. code	US viewers (millions)
1	1	"Special: Welcome to the Jungle"	July 12, 2015	101	2.21
2	2	"40 Days & 40 Nights"	July 12, 2015	102	2.95
3	3	"No Escape"	July 19, 2015	103	3.01
4	4	"Snake in the Grass"	July 26, 2015	104	2.88
5	5	"Jungle Rich"	August 2, 2015	105	2.70
6	6	"Death March"	August 9, 2015	106	2.80
7	7	"Sacrifice"	August 16, 2015	107	2.83
8	8	"Falling Apart"	August 23, 2015	108	2.65
9	9	"Filth and Fury"	August 30, 2015	109	2.42
10	10	"Special: Dirty Dozen Return"	September 6, 2015	110	N/A

==== Results ====
All of twelve contestants were separated into four teams of three in the first day of the 40-day challenge. During the challenge period, Dani, Hakim and Shane tapped out before they could complete, resulting with sickness (injuries, nausea, heat exhaustion) or quit for personal reasons, and Honora threw her teammates' survival tools into the river before tapping out. Midway through the challenge, the remaining eight people formed two teams.

=== Season 2 (2016) ===
The second season takes place in South Africa.

Location of Season 2 in the foothills of Lebombo Mountains (South Africa)

==== Participants ====
Survivalist	Prior Challenge(s)	Initial PSR	Notes
Alyssa Ballestero	S4 - Yucatán		
Carrie Booze	S3 - Cambodia		Tapped out due to bad headspace
Phaedra Brothers	S3 - India		Medically evacuated due to food poisoning by consuming bad fruit
Clarence Gilmer II	S6 - Honduras		Medically evacuated due to dehydration and heat exhaustion
Steven Lee Hall Jr	S6 - Alabama		
Ryan Holt	S4 - Florida Everglades		Medically evacuated due to food poisoning by consuming bad fruit
Kim Kelly	S5 - Panama		Medically evacuated due to food poisoning by consuming bad fruit
Tawny Lynn	S6 - Florida Seminole Forest		Medically evacuated due to falling, dehydration and heat exhaustion
Jake Nodar	S6 - Amazon/Colombia		Medically evacuated due to food poisoning by consuming bad fruit
Stacey Osorio	S6 - Croatia		
Darrin Reay	S4 - Thailand		
Angel Rodriguez	S6 - Nicaragua		Tapped out because he missed his kids

==== Episodes ====
No. overall	No. in season	Title	Original release date	Prod. code	US viewers (millions)
11	1	"Special: Mission Impossible"	July 3, 2016	201	1.04
12	2	"Lions at the Gate"	July 10, 2016	202	2.07
13	3	"Man on Fire"	July 17, 2016	203	2.06
14	4	"Human Prey"	July 24, 2016	204	2.17
15	5	"Too Many Chiefs"	July 31, 2016	205	2.06
16	6	"Rock Bottom"	August 7, 2016	206	1.84
17	7	"Deadly Consequences"	August 14, 2016	207	1.75
18	8	"The Sickness"	August 21, 2016	208	2.20
19	9	"The Last Roar"	August 28, 2016	209	2.39
20	10	"Special: Out of Africa"	September 1, 2016	210	-

==== Results ====
Angel Rodriguez, Carrie Booze, Clarence Gilmer II, Jake Nodar, Kim Kelly, Phaedra Brothers, Ryan Holt and Tawny Lynn, all tapped out due to medical issues or personal choice. On day 39, the four remaining survivors now have fishing hooks and are able to harvest a considerable amount of fish. Clarence Gilmer II had fish hooks and caught fish, which he shared with his teammates before he tapped out due to medical condition. Clarence did not have a fishing pole or atlatl. Steven Lee Hall Jr. did have an atlatl which he used in an attempt to hunt wild boars, however, he was unsuccessful. He then decided to combine his atlatl with Clarence's fish hooks to form proper fishing poles.

=== Season 3 (2017) ===
Location of Season 3 in Cuyabeno Wildlife Reserve (Ecuador)

The third season takes place in Ecuador’s Amazon basin and was shot in October and November 2016.

The series premiered on Sunday, April 23, 2017.

==== Participants ====
Survivalist	Prior Challenge(s)	Initial PSR	Notes
Matt Alexander	S6 - Philippines		Tapped out voluntarily due to mental weakness, day 4 episode 1.
Fernando Calderon	S2 - Malaysia		
Chance Davis	S7 - Ecuador		Joined the cast on Day 21 episode 5, after completing his 21-day challenge on season 7 of Naked and Afraid.
Charlie Frattini	S4 - Colombia		Medically tapped out due to torn tendons, day 1 episode 1.
Amber Hargrove	S4 - Florida Everglades; S6 - Namibia	7.4	
Giovanna Horning	S7 - Ecuador	6.2	
Lacey Jones	S7 - Belize	8.2	Medically tapped out due to injured knee, day 9 episode 3.
Shannon Kulpa	S7 - Trinidad	8.0	
Russell Sage	S1 - Panama	7.2	Tapped out voluntarily, early morning of day 33 episode 7.
Matt Wright	S6 - Thailand	8.7	Medically tapped out due to flesh-eating bacteria in his foot, day 20 episode 4.

==== Episodes ====
No. overall	No. in season	Title	Original release date	Prod. code	US viewers (millions)
21	1	"Special: Brave New World"	April 16, 2017	301	1.54
22	2	"Heart of Darkness"	April 23, 2017	302	2.06
23	3	"What Lies Beneath"	April 30, 2017	303	2.23
24	4	"Shattered"	May 7, 2017	304	1.95
25	5	"Outbreak"	May 14, 2017	305	2.01
26	6	"Worlds Collide Part 2"	May 21, 2017	306	2.20
The episode continues as a two-part special concluded from Naked and Afraid season 7 episode 12.
27	7	"Divided We Fall"	May 28, 2017	307	1.69
28	8	"Left Behind"	June 4, 2017	308	1.53
29	9	"The Final Fight"	June 11, 2017	309	1.76
30	10	"Special: Unfinished Business"	June 18, 2017	310	1.12
31	11	"Special: Triple Threat"	June 25, 2017	311	0.88

==== Results ====
Matt Wright, Russell Sage, Charlie Frattini, Lacey Jones, and Matt Alexander all tapped out because of medical issues or personal choice. On Day 20, Chance Davis joined the group from his Naked and Afraid challenge, and he stayed with the XL group until they finished on Day 40.

=== Season 4 (2018) ===
Location of Season 4 in the basin of Selati River (South Africa)

Season 4 was filmed in the basin of Selati River in South Africa in October and November 2017. It first aired on April 29, 2018. The season's theme is All Stars.

==== Participants ====
Survivalist	Prior Challenge(s)	Initial PSR	Notes
Dustin "Duck" Campbell	S8 - Belize	7.1	Tapped out due to personal choice - Misses his kids. Episode 3 - Day 7
Kaila Cummings	S7 - Colombia	7.4	
Sarah Danser	S8 - Bahamas	8.3	
Clarence Gilmer II	S6 - Honduras; XL2 - South Africa	7.9	Tapped out due to the sting of scorpion bite and high blood pressure. Episode 2 - Day 6
Gary Golding	S9 - Brazil	7.0	
Lacey Jones	S7 - Belize; XL3 - Ecuador	8.2	Tapped out due to burned hand and bad headspace. Episode 6 - Day 25
Lindsey Leitelt	S3 - Namibia	7.1	
Shane Lewis	S1 - Costa Rica; XL1 - Colombia	8.4	
Jeremy McCaa	S5 - Philippines; S7 - Louisiana	8.2	Tapped out due to illness. Episode 3 - Day 8
Melissa Miller	S7 - Ecuador	7.7	
Trent Nielsen	S5 - Belize	8.2	
Melanie Rauscher	S7 - Louisiana	8.2	Tapped out due to bad sunburn and depletion. Episode 5 - Day 13
Matt Wright	S6 - Thailand; XL3 - Ecuador	8.7	

The survivalists are divided into 4 teams of 3, along with one survivalist who wants to complete the challenge alone, broken up into 5 locations:

- Shosho Ravine: Jeremy, Gary, and Trent.
- Noja Cliffs: Melissa, Kaila and Lindsey.
- Makubu Gorge: Lacey, Shane and Clarence.
- Pitsi Flats: Sarah, Duck and Melanie.
- Kolobe Plains: Matt.

==== Episodes ====
No. overall	No. in season	Title	Original release date	Prod. code	US viewers (millions)
32	1	"Special: All-Stars: Enter The Kill Zone"	April 29, 2018	401	1.41
33	2	"All-Stars: Hunted Humans"	May 6, 2018	402	1.69
34	3	"All-Stars: Africa Strikes First"	May 13, 2018	403	1.52
35	4	"All-Stars: Africa Strikes Twice"	May 20, 2018	404	1.42
36	5	"All-Stars: To Hail And Back"	May 27, 2018	405	1.34
37	6	"All-Stars: Dead Weight"	June 3, 2018	406	1.50
38	7	"All-Stars: Burn Notice"	June 10, 2018	407	1.68
39	8	"Special: All-Stars: Savage Journey"	June 17, 2018	408	1.44
40	9	"All-Stars: Survivalists Vs. Predator"	June 17, 2018	409	1.68
41	10	"All-Stars: Feeding Frenzy"	June 24, 2018	410	1.83
42	11	"Special: All-Stars: Top Ten Tap Outs"	July 1, 2018	411	N/A
43	12	"All-Stars: Fight To The Finish"	July 1, 2018	412	1.74
44	13	"Special: All-Stars: The Lion's Den"	July 8, 2018	413	N/A

==== Results ====
Lacey Jones, Clarence Gilmer II, Dustin Campbell, Melanie Rauscher and Jeremy McCaa all tapped out because of medical issues or personal choice. Matt Wright completed his solo quest, reuniting with the other survivalists on Day 24.

=== Season 5 (2019) ===
Location of Season 5 in the island of Palawan (Philippines)

On May 14, 2019, it was announced that the fifth season would premiere on June 2, 2019.

This season's all-star cast faced the challenges of remote areas in the island of Palawan of the Philippines. Four teams of three arrived by boat and were dropped into the South China Sea, forcing them to swim through shark-infested waters to make camp on deserted islands. Some of the survivalists were seeking redemption for obstacles faced in prior seasons.

In addition, two all-stars (Jeff and Laura) embarked early on an unprecedented 60-day challenge in jungles of the Philippines, then joined the others for the remaining 40 days. Jeff and Laura's early journey premiered on Discovery's Naked and Afraid: Savage on May 19, 2019.

==== Participants ====
Survivalist	Prior Challenge(s)	Initial PSR	Notes
Gabrielle Balassone	S7 - 14 days in South Africa; S9 - 21 days in Mississippi	8.3	
Duke Brady	S9 - 21 days in Florida	7.6	
Dustin "Duck" Campbell	S8 - 21 days in Belize; XL4	7.1	Tapped out of XL Season 4. Did not complete XL Season 5: Tapped out (personal choice) - commitment to leave with Charlie. Episode 8 - Day 25.
Max Djenohan	S9 - 14 days in Panama; S10 - 21 days in Panama	6.7	
Charlie Frattini	S4 - 21 days in Colombia; XL3	7.5	Did not complete XL Season 3 Medically evacuated due to torn tendon. Episode 1 - Day 1 Did not complete XL Season 5: Medically evacuated due to abnormal heartbeat. Episode 8 - Day 25
Angela Hammer	S9 - Panama; S9 - 21 days in South Africa	7.1	
James Lewis	S9 - 21 days in Nicaragua	8.5	
Christina McQueen	S4 - 21 days in Quintana Roo	6.7	Did not complete XL Season 5: Medically evacuated due to a severe urinary tract infection. Episode 4 - Day 11.
Rylie Parlett	S9 - 21 days in Honduras	7.1	
Russell Sage	S1 - 21 days in Panama; XL3	7.9	Tapped out of XL Season 3. Did not complete XL Season 5: Medically evacuated due to bite of an unidentifiable snake.
Nicole Terry	S6 - 21 days in Nicaragua	6.1	
Manu Toigo	S1 - 21 days in Panama	8.0	Did not complete XL Season 5: Tapped out (personal choice) - concern over her sick brother. Episode 3 - Day 7.
Jeff Zausch	S2 - 21 days in Madagascar; XL1 - 40 days in Colombia; Savage 2	9.1	With Laura, accomplished 60-day XL challenge.
Laura Zerra	S1 - 21 days in Panama; S2 - 21 days in Peru; XL1 - 40 days in Colombia; S10 - 14 days in Alaska; Savage 2	9.5	With Jeff, accomplished 60-day XL challenge.

==== Episodes ====
No. overall	No. in season	Title	Original release date	Prod. code	US viewers (millions)
45	1	"Special: Not A Drop To Drink"	May 26, 2019	501	0.910
Twelve elite survivalists enter an unprecedented 40-day XL challenge. In the ocean off the coast of the Philippines, they must survive a shark-infested ocean, great barracuda, and the greater blue-ringed octopus and then face the dense Philippine jungle crawling with deadly snakes and monitor lizards.
46	2	"Waterworld"	June 2, 2019	502	1.577
Twelve elite survivalists are dropped into the brutal South China Sea where they must survive 40 days on land and sea. Plus, two All-Star survivalists enter the same challenge looking to survive not just 40 but an unprecedented 60 days.
47	3	"Surviving with Sharks"	June 9, 2019	503	1.644
With resources dwindling, the survivalists venture into the shark-infested waters of the South China Sea searching for a much-needed meal. The brutal conditions on both land and sea lead to the Philippines claiming its first victim.
48	4	"The Devil and the South China Sea"	June 16, 2019	504	1.564
Ambushed by violent tropical storms, the survivalists are pounded by torrential rain and heavy surf. When one team takes to the open seas they are stalked by territorial sharks. The storms and lack of food brings one survivalist to their breaking point.
49	5	"Belly of the Beast"	June 23, 2019	505	1.453
With extraction on the other side of the island, and the open sea too dangerous to navigate, the only way out for the survivalists is to go in. But trekking through the thick jungle they must watch out for venomous centipedes, vipers, and monitor lizards.
50	6	"No Hand-Outs"	June 30, 2019	506	1.537
A survivalist on a hunting expedition is bitten by a snake and requires an emergency medical evacuation. Tensions rise between teams as hunting grounds get territorial. One group scores protein while their neighbors are on the brink of starvation.
51	7	"Hike Into Hell"	July 7, 2019	507	1.520
A grueling five-mile hike into the snake-filled jungles of the Palawan island pushes the three remaining teams of survivalists. The one-day journey turns into two days of chaos and one survivalist must be medically evacuated from the challenge.
52	8	"Jeff's Worst Nightmare"	July 14, 2019	508	1.623
The group is devastated when two critical survivalists leave the challenge. With just 10 days left before extraction, Jeff is forced to change his survival strategy but a medical emergency quickly has him on the brink of a tap out.
53	9	"Special: Apex Predators"	July 14, 2019	509	1.170
Stalked by the deadliest animals including lions, spitting cobras and bull sharks, survivalists' every step could bring disaster. To make it 40 Days, they must use their skills to avoid becoming prey while hunting the most elusive and dangerous creatures.
54	10	"Goodbye Cruel Waterworld"	July 21, 2019	510	1.824
Medics closely monitor Jeff's high fever and prepare his evacuation. The others prepare for an 5-mile extraction journey through the jungle and shark-infested waters. A survivalist pushes too hard leading to a medical emergency on the open sea.
55	11	"Special: Den of Vipers (Cast Reunion)"	July 27, 2019	511	N/A
Jeff is called out for his "no hand-outs" survival strategy but refuses to back down. Through a free-wheeling discussion, new interviews, and never-before-seen footage, it's a new look into how the survivalists survived land, sea and each other.

=== Season 6 (2020) ===
Location of Season 6 in South Africa

In a season billed as "Valley of the Banished", survivalists are encouraged to banish the weak. Pairs of survivalists who succeeded in previous challenges are grouped with one who failed a prior attempt.

==== Participants ====
Survivalist	Prior Challenge(s)	Initial PSR	Notes
Sarah Bartell	S10 - Ecuador	8.1	
Joshua Bell	S3 - Nicaragua	4.3	Banished by Gwen and Wes, immediately tapped out rather than continue. Episode 1, Day 3.
Jon Bonessi	S11 - Philippines	8.2	
Dawn Dussault	S7 - Montserrat	4.4	Tapped out due to fear. Episode 1, Day 2.
Ryan Eacret	S11- Africa	5.7	Medically evacuated due to mental issues. Episode 10, Day 31.
Bulent Gurcan	S10 - Colombia; S11 - Mexico	7.4	Abandoned by Kate, then Makani, then banished by Sarah, Jon, Gwen, and Suzanne. Spent the majority of the challenge alone.
Gwen Grimes	S10 - Mexico	8.4	
Wes Harper	S10 - Brazil	7.4	Medically tapped due to bowel obstruction. Episode 9, Day 28.
Makani Nalu	S10 - Ecuador	6.0	Self-banished from Bulent. Tapped out voluntarily after being narrowly resuscitated from heatstroke by medics. Episode 5, Day 14.
Seth Reece	S10 - Panama	4.0	Abandoned by Suzanne. Rejected by Bulent. Sustained heatstroke and tapped out voluntarily before medics could evaluate him. Episode 8, Day 24.
Kate Wentworth	S10 - Panama	5.0	Self-banished from Bulent and Makani. Tapped out voluntarily. Episode 4, Day 10.
Suzänne Zeta	S9 - Brazil	8.7	Self-banished from Seth.

The survivalists start grouped into 4 teams of 3, in 4 locations:

Northwest: Gwen, Wes, and Josh.
Southeast: Dawn, Suzänne, and Seth.
Northeast: Makani, Bulent, and Kate.
Southwest: Jon, Sarah, and Ryan.

==== Episodes ====
No. overall	No. in season	Title	Original release date	Prod. code	US viewers (millions)
56	1	"Valley of the Banished"	May 24, 2020	601	N/A
57	2	"Croc Shock"	May 31, 2020	602	N/A
58	3	"The Barehanded Killer"	June 7, 2020	603	N/A
59	4	"No Calm After the Storm"	June 14, 2020	604	N/A
60	5	"Boiling Point"	June 21, 2020	605	N/A
61	6	"Feastmode"	June 28, 2020	606	N/A
62	7	"A Matter of Life or Seth"	July 5, 2020	607	N/A
63	8	"Keep Your Frenemies Close"	July 12, 2020	608	N/A
64	9	"Third Times the Harm"	July 19, 2020	609	N/A
65	10	"Crossbow and a Cross To Bear"	July 26, 2020	610	N/A
66	11	"Banished But Not Broken"	August 2, 2020	611	N/A

==== Results ====
Of the twelve participants, only five completed the challenge: Sarah, Gwen, Suzänne and Jon who formed a single team and Bulent alone.

=== Season 7 (2021) ===
Location of Season 7 in Louisiana (United States)

With no food, water, or clothes a group of the best survival experts in the world take on the Atchafalaya Basin, the largest wetland and swamp on the country, located in south-central Louisiana. The location is full of murky waters and has predators lurking all over its 7,000 acres vast land. The first Naked and Afraid XL challenge where all survivalists attempt 60 days and 60 nights in order to become XL Legends.

==== Participants ====
Survivalist	Prior Challenge(s)	XLS Day 1	XLS Day 3	XLS Day 8	XLS Day 13	XLS Day 17	XLS Day 23	XLS Day 30	XLS Day 35	XLS Day 40	XLS Day 50	XLS Day 59	Notes
Sarah Danser	S8 - Bahamas; XL4 - South Africa	47%	52%	56%	42%								Tapped out due to the cold. Episode 4, Day 16.
Max Djenohan	S9 - Panama; S10 - Panama; XL5 - Philippines	54%	41%	35%	51%	67%	56%	41%	25%	41%	36%	39%	
Gary Golding	S9 - Brazil; XL4 - South Africa; S10 - Bootcamp; S10 - South Africa; S11 - Belize	54%	41%	35%	51%	67%	56%	43%	61%	32%			Tapped out due to illness of unknown cause. Episode 8, Day 40.
Steven Lee Hall Jr.	S6 - Alabama; XL2 - South Africa; S10 - Boreal Tundra (Alaska)	34%	22%	58%	35%	63%	51%	39%	28%	48%	54%	39%	
Amber Hargrove	S4 - Florida Everglades; S6 - Namibia; XL3 - Ecuador	54%	41%	35%	51%	67%	56%						Medically evacuated due to complications from a previous injury. Episode 5, Day 23.
Ryan Holt	S4 - Florida Everglades; XL2 - South Africa	62%	36%	42%	71%	42%	60%	41%	25%	41%	54%	39%	
Lacey Jones	S7 - Belize; XL3 - Ecuador; XL4 - South Africa; S11 - South Africa	34%	22%										Tapped out due to lack of sleep and mental exhaustion. Episode 2, Day 8.
Rylie Parlett	S9 - Honduras; XL5 - Philippines	62%	36%	42%	71%	42%	60%	41%	25%	41%	54%	39%	
EJ Snyder	S1 - Tanzania; S2 - Amazon; S11 - Bulgaria; XL1 - Colombia	47%	52%	56%	42%	29%	21%	10%	61%	32%	36%	39%	
Matt Wright	S6 - Thailand; XL3 - Ecuador; XL4 - South Africa; S10 - Bootcamp; S10 - South Africa	62%	36%	42%	71%	42%	60%	41%	25%	41%	54%	39%	
Jeff Zausch	S2 - Madagascar; XL1 - Colombia; XL5 - Philippines	34%	22%	58%	35%	63%	51%	39%	28%	48%	54%	39%	
Suzänne Zeta	S9 - Brazil; XL6 - South Africa	47%	52%	56%									Tapped out due to bad headspace. Episode 3, Day 12.

The survivalists are divided into 4 teams of 3, in 4 locations:

North: Matt, Riley, and Ryan.
South: Steven, Lacey, and Jeff.
West: Max, Amber, and Gary.
East: EJ, Sarah, and Suzänne.

On Day 30, Gary and Max set off for a new area and joined EJ in the East.
On Day 35, Jeff and Steven set off for a new area and joined Matt, Riley, and Ryan in the North as Neighbors, not teammates. On Day 51, the remaining survivalists met up on their trek toward the extraction point and joined forces.

==== Episodes ====
No. overall	No. in season	Title	Original release date	Prod. code	US viewers (millions)
67	1	"That all you got Louisiana?"	April 25, 2021	701	N/A
68	2	"Chomping at his bits"	May 2, 2021	702	N/A
69	3	"Gat-R-done"	May 9, 2021	703	N/A
70	4	"Gary eats all the things"	May 16, 2021	704	N/A
71	5	"Itching for revenge"	May 23, 2021	705	N/A
72	6	"EJ's ball and pain"	May 30, 2021	706	N/A
73	7	"A Bridge Over Swampy Water"	June 6, 2021	707	1.32
74	8	"A Feast of the eyes"	June 13, 2021	708	1.15
75	9	"Cold grudges die hard"	June 20, 2021	709	1.22
76	10	"All In to Get Out"	June 27, 2021	710	1.54

=== Season 8 (2022) ===
Location of Season 8 in Peru Amazon

On April 8, 2022, it was announced that the eighth season would premiere on May 1, 2022. Season 8 is set in a Peruvian rainforest and is named Naked and Afraid XL: Next Level. During this season, four Naked and Afraid XL veterans attempted an epic 60-day challenge while leading a new generation of survivalists embarking on their first 40 days.

==== Participants ====
Survivalist	Prior Challenge(s)	XLS Day 1 (Note: First is individual success rating, second is small group rating - when there is no second number, the person was solo)	XLS Day 4	XLS Day 7	XLS Day 14	XLS Day 21	XLS Day 27	XLS Day 30	XLS Day 35	XLS Day 42	XLS Day 51	XLS Day 59	Notes
Waz Addy	S12 - Florida	70% / 66%	21% / 30%	32% / 22%	57% / 54%	66% / 61%	64% / 51%	71% / 68%	41% / 38%	68% / 66%	42% / 43%	59% / 62%	Competed for 40-day challenge and extended to 60-day challenge
Rod Biggs	S11 - Africa	67% / 66%	38% / 30%	11% / 22%									Medically evacuated on Day 8 due to food-bourne parasites
Trish Bulinsky	S10 - Colombia	52% / 43%	62% / 53%	67% / 60%	43% / 41%	63% / 65%	52% / 51%	33% / 29%	14% / 21%				Completed 40-day challenge
Kaila Cumings	S7 - Colombia; XL4 - South Africa	66% / 59%	78% / 72%										Tapped out on Day 6 due to effects of a burned foot
Jamie Frizzell	S13 - South Africa	42% / 59%											Tapped out on Day 2
Gary Golding	S9 - Brazil; XL4 - South Africa; S10 - Bootcamp; S10 - South Africa; S11 - Belize; XL7 - Louisiana	62% / 66%											Medically evacuated on Day 2 due to contact with poisonous tree
Lisa Hagan	S11 - Bermuda Triangle	71% / 72%	12% / 32%										Tapped out on Day 4
Steven Lee Hall Jr.	S6 - Alabama; XL2 - South Africa; S10 - Boreal Tundra (Alaska); XL7 - Louisiana; S9 - Bahamas (shark week special)	78% / 72%	56% / 32%	56%	64%	39%	52%	59%	67% / 65%	49% / 47%	44% / 43%	67% / 62%	Completed 60-day challenge
Amber Hargrove	S4 - Florida Everglades; S6 - Namibia; XL3 - Ecuador; XL7 - Louisiana	43% / 43%	77% / 53%	75% / 60%	56% / 41%	79% / 65%	62% / 51%	35%	63% / 65%	45% / 47%	48% / 43%	65% / 62%	Completed 60-day challenge
Dan Link	S10 - Mexico; S12 - US/Mexico	49% / 59%	65% / 72%	32%	51% / 54%	55% / 61%	32% / 51%	65% / 68%	34% / 38%	63% / 66%	38% / 43%	58% / 62%	Competed for 40-day challenge and extended to 60-day challenge
Tim Phillips	S11 - South Africa	68% / 72%	28% / 32%										Tapped out on Day 4
EJ Snyder	S1 - Tanzania; S2 - Amazon; S11 - Bulgaria; XL1 - Colombia; XL-7 - Louisiana	Legend joined on Day 21 and was not given an XLS											Completed extraction on Day 60
Jen Taylor	S10 - Guyana; S11 - Bulgaria	34% / 43%	19% / 53%	37% / 60%	23% / 41%	54% / 65%	40% / 51%	24% / 29%	27% / 21%				Completed 40-day challenge
Matt Wright	S6 - Thailand; XL3 - Ecuador; XL4 - South Africa; S10 - Bootcamp; S10 - South Africa; XL-7 - Louisiana	Legend joined on Day 21 and was not given an XLS											Completed extraction on Day 60
Jeff Zausch	S2 - Madagascar; XL1 - Colombia; XL5 - Philippines; XL7 - Louisiana	Legend joined on Day 21 and was not given an XLS											Tapped out on Day 29 due to “stomach issues.” Given fluids and antibiotics in the hospital and recovered in four days. The cause was unknown.

The survivalists are divided into 4 teams of 3, in 4 locations:

- Jamie, Dan, Kaila
- Steven, Tim, Lisa
- Gary, Waz, Rod
- Amber, Jen, Trish

On Day 12, Dan and Waz meet and move to Dan's camp area.
On Day 21, three Legends return and join each of the three remaining groups. Jeff joins Amber, Trish and Jen. Matt joins Dan and Waz. EJ joins Steven.
On Day 28, EJ and Steven move to the previous campsite left by Waz.
On Day 30, Amber sets off on her own, leaving Jen and Trish. She joins Steven and EJ.
On Day 44, the remaining 6 survivalists join forces to complete the challenge.

==== Episodes ====
No. overall	No. in season	Title	Original release date	Prod. code	US viewers (millions)
77	0	"The Next Level Begins"	April 24, 2022	101-47	N/A
78	1	"I'm In Big Trouble"	May 1, 2022	801	N/A
XL rookies try to survive 40 days in the Peruvian Amazon while vets try to become legends by lasting 60 days. The jungle's aggressive piranha, venomous fer de lance and poison plants prove too much for four survivalists who are gone within four days.
79	2	"Amazon Pain Forest"	May 8, 2022	802	N/A
A survivalist's first meal may be their last when bacteria brings them to their knees. A painful foot burn has an XL veteran on the brink. Conflicting survival priorities spark tension for Amber and Trish. The Amazon forces two more from the challenge.
80	3	"In Your Face, Amazon!"	May 15, 2022	803	N/A
Only six survivalists remain in the Amazon. Steven takes a huge risk when he raids a caiman nest for eggs. Dan and Waz join forces to snare the vultures circling their camp. Amber, Trish and Jen take on a huge project but tensions could tear them apart.
81	4	"The Legends Return"	May 22, 2022	804	N/A
Three elite survivalists join the challenge. Dan and Waz take on dangerous prey to get a big score but it could mean serious injury. Amber battles an aggressive caiman to feed her team. Steven’s main source of food turns sour.
82	5	"Mutiny in the Jungle"	May 29, 2022	805	N/A
The Legends put their mark on the challenge. Desperate to get food for Steven, EJ creates poison blow darts to chase a much-needed meal. Matt spearheads an ambitious dock build that drains Dan's strength. Jeff adds to the tension on Amber's team.
83	6	"Legendary Fail"	June 5, 2022	806	TBD
Jeff struggles to keep down food. Trish and Amber hit a breaking point. Matt, Dan and Waz cross piranha-filled water and score a big kill. EJ and Steven's new camp is stalked by a jaguar. A survivalist leaves their group to go solo.
84	7	"Careful What You Fish For"	June 12, 2022	807	TBD
With Amber gone, Trish and Jen must fend for themselves. Amber joins forces with Steven and EJ. A distant fishing hole means a punishing journey for their next meal. After a huge food win, Dan and Waz make a high-risk choice.
85	8	"You Left Us to Rot"	June 19, 2022	808	TBD
Desperate for food ahead of their Day 40 extraction, Jen pushes Trish to hunt new territory, while Matt gives Dan and Waz a risky choice to consider. Dan, Waz and Matt corner one of the Amazon's apex predators, a six-foot caiman. When Trish and Amber's paths cross again, tensions re-surface.
86	9	"A Gathering Swarm"	June 26, 2022	809	TBD
Pushing past day 50, the final six survivalists come together as one group but must scramble to expand their shelter. The Amazon unleashes a bee swarm and a torrential storm. A knife accident threatens a survivalist's challenge.
87	10	"Jungle Gangsters Out"	July 3, 2022	810	TBD
With day 60 extraction looming, a hunt goes awry and leads to an all-out jungle search for wounded prey. The team's large-scale raft build could be a crushing waste of time and calories. A survivalist decides this will be their last challenge.

=== Season 9 (2022) ===
Location of Season 9 in Montana Rocky Mountains

On July 6, 2022, it was announced that the ninth season would premiere on July 31, 2022. Season 9 is set in the frozen Rocky Mountains of Montana, USA and is named Naked and Afraid XL: Frozen. Filming location is set in the valley below Emigrant Peak near Merriman Montana. Because of the extreme cold, participants are given animal hides to use/wear and the length of the challenge is 14 days instead of 40.

==== Participants ====
Survivalist	Prior Challenge(s)	FSR	Notes
Waz Addy	S12 - Florida; XL8 - Amazon		
Gabrielle Balassone	S7 - South Africa; S9 - Mississippi; XL5 - Philippines		
Sarah Bartell	S10 - Ecuador; XL6 - Africa		
Rod Biggs	S12 - Africa; XL8 - Amazon	voluntarily Taps Ep 2 due to Back Issues	
Trish Bulinsky	S10 - Colombia; XL8 - Amazon		
Sara Burkett	S10 - Panama; S11 - Mexico	Medically Tapped Ep 5 due to Low Oxygen and Fever	
Ky Furneaux	S1 - Louisiana; S9 - Bahamas (shark week special); S11 - Ecuador		
Wes Harper	S9 - Brazil; XL6 - South Africa; S12 - Ecuador		
Jermaine Jackson	S9 - Tennessee		
Jeremy McCaa	S5 - Philippines; S7 - Louisiana; XL4 - South Africa		
Jake Nodar	S6 - Amazon/Colombia/Florida Black Water Swamp; XL2 - South Africa		
Joe Ortlip	S12 - Montana	Medically Tapped Ep 4 due to Continuously High Heart Rate	

==== Episodes ====
No. overall	No. in season	Title	Original release date	Prod. code	US viewers (millions)
88	1	"Rocky Road Ahead / Rocked by the Rockies"	July 31, 2022	901	N/A
Twelve elite survivalists venture to Montana's sub-zero conditions in the Rocky Mountains.
89	2	"Stay With Me"	July 31, 2022	802	N/A
90	3	"Hypothermic When Wet"	August 7, 2022	803	N/A
91	4	"Snow Rest for the Weary"	August 14, 2022	804	N/A
92	5	"Thin Air, Fat Chance"	August 21, 2022	805	N/A
93	6	"Bear of a Finish"	August 28, 2022	806	N/A
After a fatal bear attack miles away from their camp; the survivors must be on their toes as they make the final push to extraction.

=== Season 10 (2024) ===
A fresh crop of survivalists takes on their first XL challenge in Colombia's Badlands, an area teeming with disease-carrying insects, venomous snakes, stalking jaguars and six-foot caimans. For the first time, survivalists must trek 40 miles in 40 days.

The 2024 season kicked off on May 12, 2024 with an episode entitled, Enter the Proving Grounds. The tagline is "The ultimate survival challenge just got harder. 40 miles. 40 days. 40 nights. No food, water or clothes."

Contestants start as four groups of three people.

==== Participants ====
Survivalist	Prior Challenge(s)	FSR	Notes
Adam Kavanagh	S12 Africa		
Andrew Shayde	S12; S15; Castaways		voluntarily Taps Day 4 due to Hand Injury
Christopher James	S11; S15		voluntarily Taps Day 6 due to Unknown Illness
Cole Wilks	S17		voluntarily Taps Day 4 due to Fear
Heather Smith	S15; Castaways		
Kaiela Hobart	S11 Africa		
Lynsey McCarver	S13		
Malorie Romero	S15		
Nathan Martinez	S10		
Sam Mouzer	S15		voluntarily Taps Day # due to Multiple Insect Bites and Allergic Reaction
Shell Armogida	S17		
Terra Short	S14; Solo		Severely injured their hand on Day 3 - Continues On

The survivalists are divided into 4 teams of 3, in 4 locations

- Kaiela, Cole and Andrew
- Christopher, Malorie and Shell
- Nathan, Terra and Lynsey
- Heather, Adam and Sam

==== Episodes ====
Episode 1: The groups start off the longest journey in Naked and Afraid XL History: 40 Miles in 40 Days. Andrew tapped due to a hand injury and Cole tapped the same day due to mental exhaustion and loss of spirit.
Episode 2: Chris tapped due to an unknown debilitating sickness.
Episode 3: Sam tapped
Episode 4: No taps. Now alone Kaiela finds and joins Malorie and Shell.
Episode 5: No taps.
Episode 6: Heather and Adam find and join Lynsey, Terra and Nathan.
Episode 7: The tribe of five find and join Malorie, Kaiela and Shell.
Episode 8: All participants, now in one tribe, head to extraction.

== Production ==
Continent	Locations (season number)
Africa	South Africa (2, 4, 6)
Asia	Philippines (5)
South America	Colombia (1, 10), Ecuador (3), Peru (8)
North America	Louisiana (7) Montana (9)

== Broadcast ==
In Australia, the series premiered on September 10, 2015 on Discovery Channel. In India this show is running on Discovery channel, Discovery channel HD and available on Amazon Prime Video.

== See also ==
- List of Naked and Afraid episodes
- Naked and Afraid
- Marooned with Ed Stafford
- Ed Stafford: Into The Unknown
- Walking the Amazon
- Robinsonade
