= Naked and Afraid =

American reality television series

- Genre: Reality
- Narrated by: Michael Brown
- Country of origin: United States
- Original language: English
- No. of seasons: 19
- No. of episodes: 202 (list of episodes)

Production
- Executive producers: David Garfinkle; Jay Renfroe; Jim Morton; Sean Foley
- Running time: 60 minutes
- Production company: Renegade 83

Original release
- Network: Discovery Channel
- Release: June 23, 2013 – present

Related
- Naked and Afraid XL; Naked and Afraid: Alone; Naked and Afraid: Solo; Naked and Afraid of Love; Naked And Afraid: Last One Standing; Naked and Afraid: Castaways

Naked and Afraid is an American reality series that airs on the Discovery Channel. Each episode chronicles the lives of two survivalists who meet for the first time naked and are given the task of surviving a stay in the wilderness for 21 days. Each survivalist is allowed to bring one helpful item, such as a machete or a fire starter. After they meet in the assigned location, the partners must build a shelter and find water and food.

== Synopsis ==
The events of each couple's journey play out in a single episode. Partners strip down and meet each other. They are provided with rough cross-body satchels containing a personal diary/camera, for use when the camera crew is not there at night, and a map. They all wear identical necklaces with a center bead, which is a microphone with a wire that connects to a wireless audio transmitter hidden in the satchel. Some personal jewelry is allowed. Each survivalist is allowed to bring one helpful item, such as a hatchet or a fire starter.

There is a camera crew who are not allowed to intervene except for medical emergencies when it is "absolutely necessary". Castmate Alison Teal reports that she was granted an "emergency" tampon.

At the beginning of the fourth season, the survivalists were given a third "surprise" option. Team members are allowed to "tap out" at any point during the 21-day challenge. If they do not tap out, they must arrive at the designated extraction point on the final day to be picked up by a helicopter, plane, automobile, boat or other vehicle suitable for the environment. Viewers are updated throughout with statistics, including how many days have passed, the time, and the temperature. Naked and Afraid computes and then updates the cast members' PSR (Primitive Survival Rating), which is based on predictions and observations of survival fitness in skill, experience, and mental strengths. Before and after weight measurements are also revealed at the end of an episode.

== Episodes ==
Season	Episodes	Originally released	
Season	Episodes	First released	Last released
1	6	June 23, 2013	December 14, 2013
2	6	March 16, 2014	April 27, 2014
3	10	June 22, 2014	October 12, 2014
4	12	April 19, 2015	August 2, 2015
5	5	October 4, 2015	November 1, 2015
6	12	March 13, 2016	June 12, 2016
7	11	March 5, 2017	May 21, 2017
8	6	July 30, 2017	August 20, 2017
9	15	March 11, 2018	August 12, 2018
10	26	March 3, 2019	December 19, 2019
11	30	December 1, 2019	August 16, 2020
12	11	March 7, 2021	April 18, 2021
13	6	August 1, 2021	September 5, 2021
14	13	February 26, 2022	April 23, 2022
15	11	February 19, 2023	April 30, 2023
16	5	October 15, 2023	November 12, 2023
17	12	February 18, 2024	May 5, 2024
18	12	March 9, 2025	May 11, 2025
19	TBA	February 15, 2026	TBA

== Spin-offs and versions ==
- Naked and Afraid XL consists of six pairs of contestants trying to survive 40 days.
- Naked and Afraid: Alone follows one contestant at a time trying to survive 21 days with no partner or tribe.
- Naked and Afraid: Solo follows several contestants in parallel, though they never meet.
- Naked and Afraid of Love takes place in gentler climate and the contestants are romance-oriented.
- Naked and Afraid: Last One Standing pits the contestants against each other for a cash prize.
- Naked and Afraid: Castaways groups the contestants into threes and takes place on tropical islands.
- Naked and Afraid: Apocalypse In a harsh, post-apocalyptic world, twelve seasoned survivalists face their ultimate challenge

== Production ==
=== Locations ===
The production's home base is in the United States (the Louisiana Bayou, Florida (Everglades and Seminole County) and Alabama). Panama was used as a setting twice in the first and fifth seasons, Nicaragua was also used twice as well in the third season. Like the first season, the second season visited six countries as well, using Malaysia as a setting once again (Season 1 shot on the Malaysian Borneo, while Season 2's survivalists were stranded in Peninsular Malaysia). Season 10 took contestants to the frozen tundra of Alaska and an African Kill Zone.

United States

Region	Locations (season number)
Southern	Alabama (6), Florida (4, 6, 9, 12, 19), (Georgia (U.S. state)) Georgia (12), Kentucky (18), Louisiana (1, 7), Mississippi (9), Tennessee (9), Texas (8, 12)
Western	Alaska (10), Arizona (12), Colorado (12), Montana (10, 12), New Mexico (15)
Midwestern	Illinois (18)

International

Continent	Locations (season number)
Africa	Botswana (3, 14, 19), Madagascar (2), Mozambique (10), Namibia (3, 5, 6, 12), South Africa (7, 9, 10, 11, 12, 13, 15, 16, 17), Tanzania (1), Zambia (14, 15, 16, 19)
Asia	Cambodia (3), India (3, 4), Malaysia (1, 2), Maldives (1), Philippines (5, 6, 18), Thailand (4, 6, 19)
Europe	Croatia (6, 8), Bulgaria (11), United Kingdom (7) (Note: Only visited the overseas territory of Montserrat (7), it is located in the Caribbean.)
North America	(The Bahamas) Bahamas (3, 8, 9), Belize (2, 5, 6, 7, 8, 18), Canada (6), Costa Rica (1), Dominica (3), Honduras (6, 9), Mexico (4, 9, 10, 12, 14, 15, 16, 18), Nicaragua (3, 4, 6, 9), Panama (1, 5, 7, 9, 10), Trinidad and Tobago (7, 16)
South America	Argentina (3, 15), Bolivia (2), Brazil (3, 9, 10), Colombia (4, 6, 7, 10, 14, 15, 17), Ecuador (7, 8, 10, 12, 13), Guyana (4, 15), Peru (2)
Oceania	Australia (6, 7), Fiji (2)

=== Casting call ===
On July 31, 2013, Discovery Channel posted a casting call and a dare to "survive the 21-day challenge" via their Twitter account.

=== Naked After Dark ===
Following the success of the live talk show Shark After Dark, Discovery aired Naked After Dark in season two, which aired after each new episode. Host Josh Wolf talked with the cast from the episode, showed behind-the-scenes and never before seen episode footage and has in-studio stunts. It aired for 1 season with 6 episodes.

=== Pop-up editions ===
Starting in June 2014, Discovery started airing repeat episodes of the show with "pop-up" text on the screen. These graphics shed light on the countries and the survivalists with interesting and often humorous factoids. These shows premiere on Wednesday nights.

== Reception ==
=== Critical reception ===
By the time of the 2015 season premiere, Brian Moylan of The Guardian called it the "best reality show on television" as it "takes the outrageousness of other reality genres, but applies it to celebrate human strength and fortitude rather than exploiting the frailty and narcissism of those that just want to be noticed."

Reviewing the premiere in 2013, Brian Lowry of Variety found Naked and Afraid to be "typical of the genre, but it's still kind of a risible kick, if only for how seriously the show takes itself." Melissa Camacho of Common Sense Media, and David Hinckley of the New York Daily News, gave the show 3 out of 5 stars.

Mike Hale of The New York Times expressed skepticism that the dangers implied by the situations faced by the couples in each episode were authentic, even by the standards of reality television, observing that the couple in the series premiere appeared to be cleaner and more shaven than he would have expected. Hale also was not impressed with the interaction between the two participants, whose personalities he found uninteresting, stating that he found the snake bite suffered by the field producer shown in the beginning of the episode to be more riveting.

=== Ratings ===
Discovery Channel issued a press release which announced some Nielsen ratings milestones for the series. Naked And Afraid was the "#1 Ad-Supported program in cable among men on Sunday, July 28." They also noted that the program now shares the Discovery Channel record for the highest-rated survival telecast in the network's history since June 2009. The "Surthrive" episode in season 4, featuring Bo Stuart and Debbie Harris, is the highest rated episode in the history of the show.

=== Controversy ===
There has been controversy related to how real the show is. Former contestants have said that the locations are not as isolated as portrayed. A contestant was treated with IV fluids so she could continue, but this was not shown. Les Stroud, of the survival show Survivorman, has been very vocal with his criticism.

== See also ==
- List of Naked and Afraid episodes
- Naked and Afraid XL
- Marooned with Ed Stafford
- Ed Stafford: Into The Unknown
- Walking the Amazon
- Robinsonade

== International versions ==
Country	Local title	Original channel	Premiere date	Season	Ref.
Brazil	Largados e Pelados Brasil	Max	November 9, 2021	3 Season	
France	Retour à l'instinct primaire	RMC Découverte	August 29, 2018	2 Seasons	
Spain	Aventura en pelotas	Max	January 12, 2025	1 Season	
