= List of explorers =

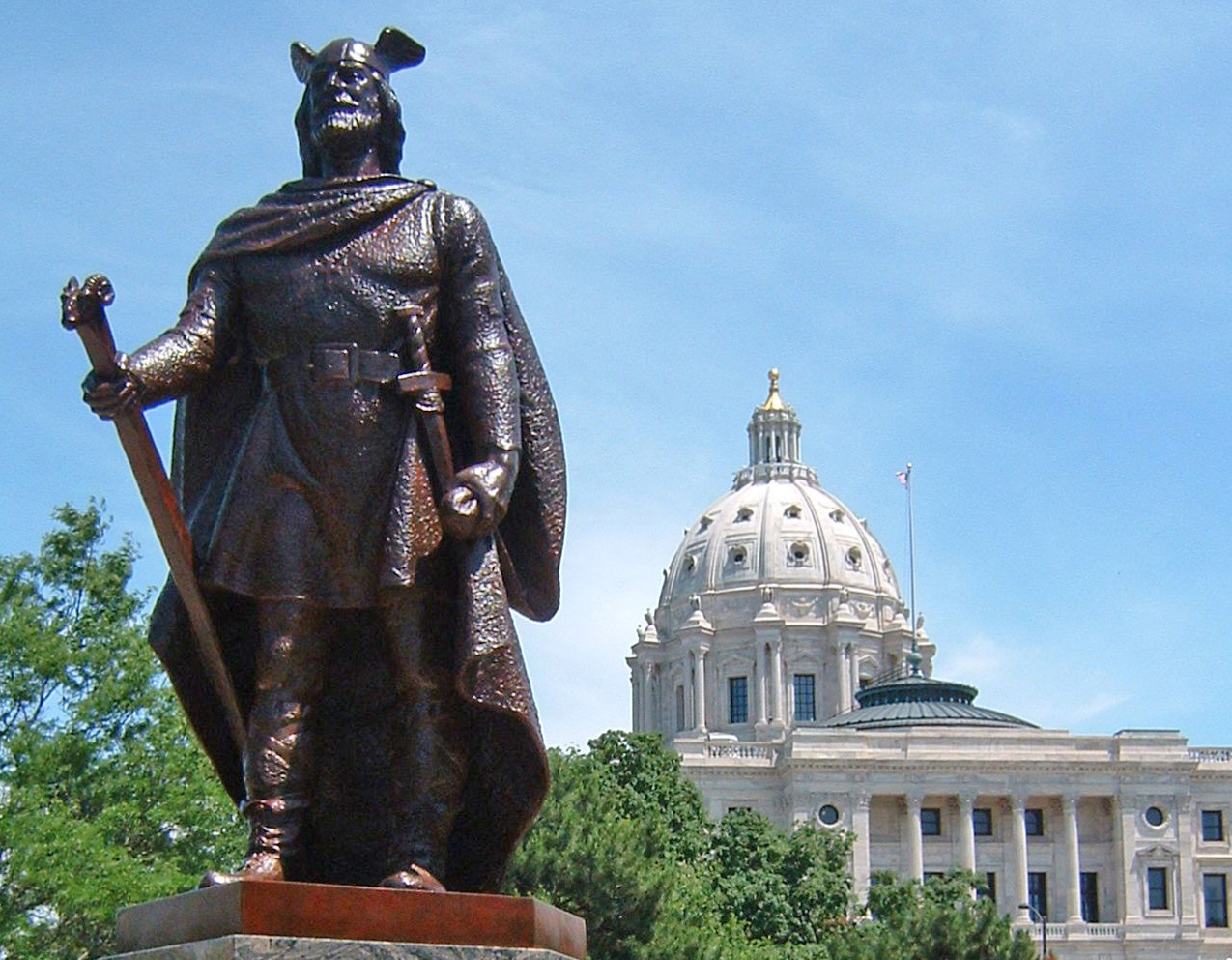
Leif Erikson (c. 970 – c. 1020) was a famous Norse explorer who is credited for being the first European to set foot on American soil.

Explorers are listed below with their common names, countries of origin (modern and former), centuries of activity and main areas of exploration.

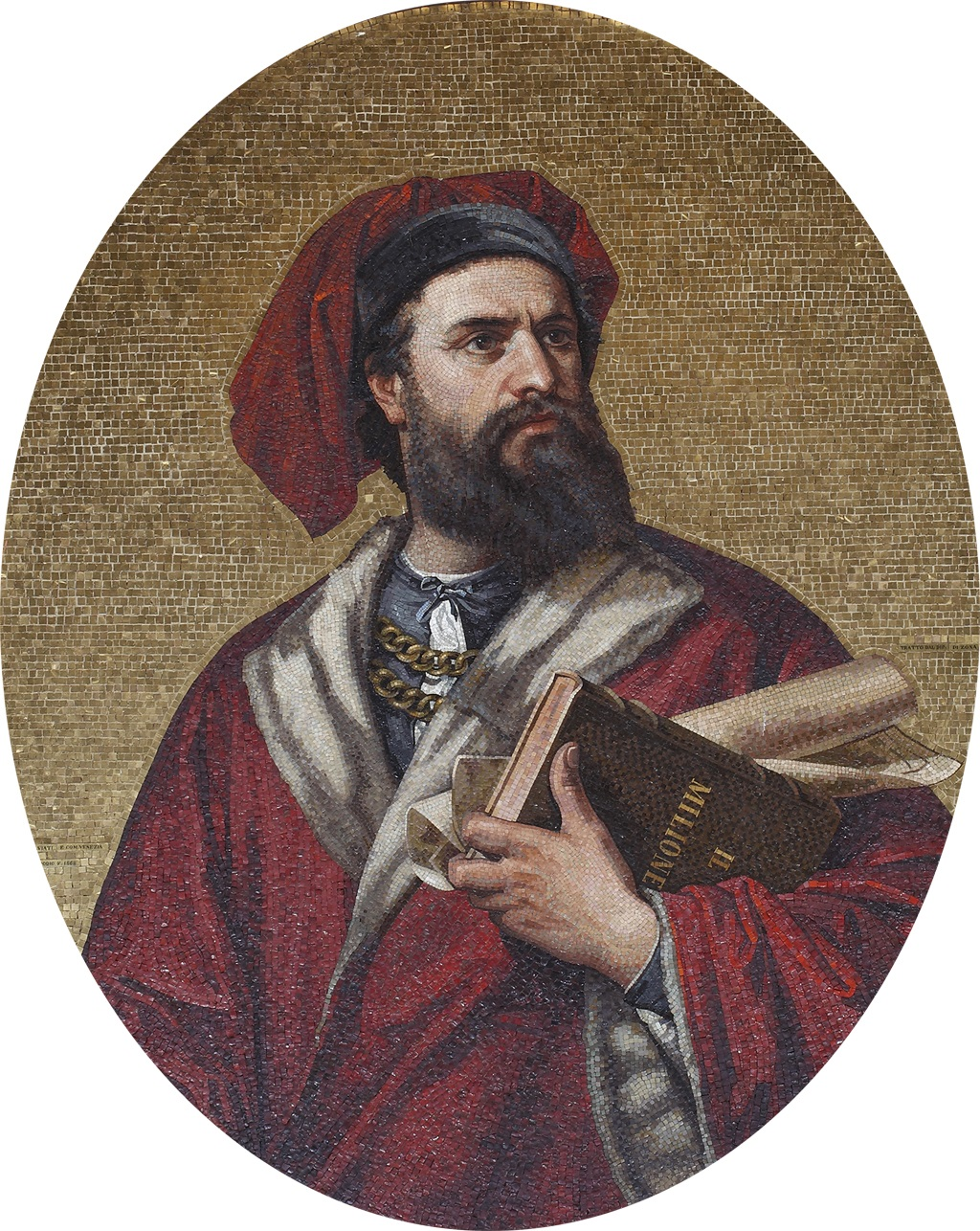
Marco Polo (1254–1324) was an Italian explorer who recorded his 24 years-long travels in the Book of the Marvels of the World, introducing Europeans to Central Asia and China.

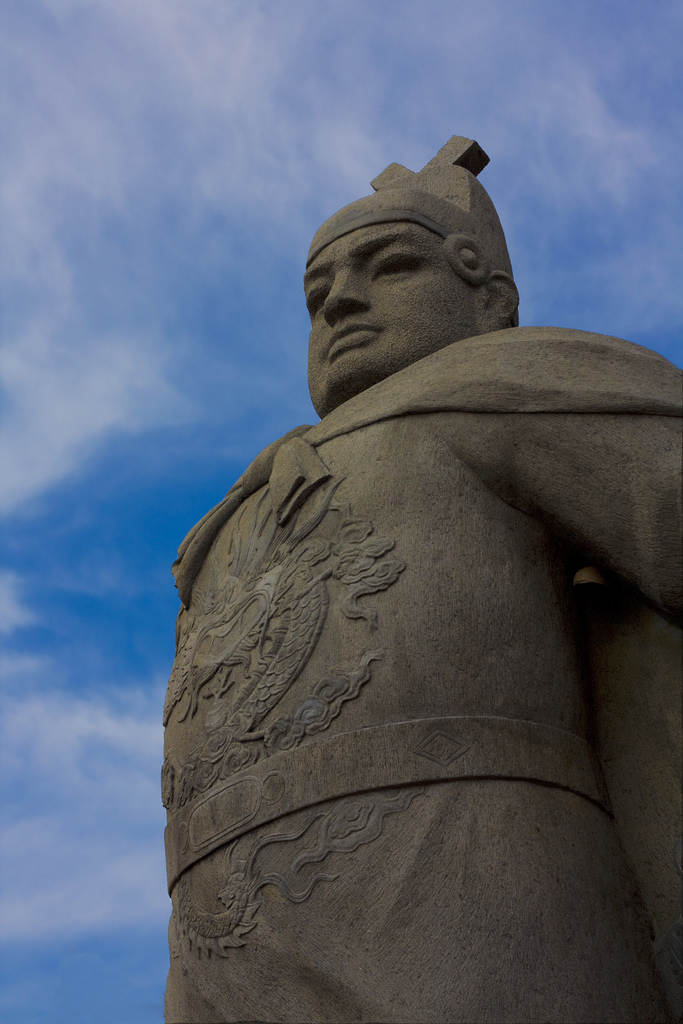
Zheng He (1371 – c. 1435) was a Chinese explorer who sailed along the Southeast Asian, South Asian, Western Asian, and East African coasts along with his fleet of large ships and several hundred men.

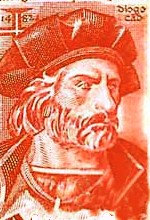
(Portugal) Diogo Cão (c. 1452 – 1486) was the first European to explore the Congo River and the west coast of Africa, south of the equator.

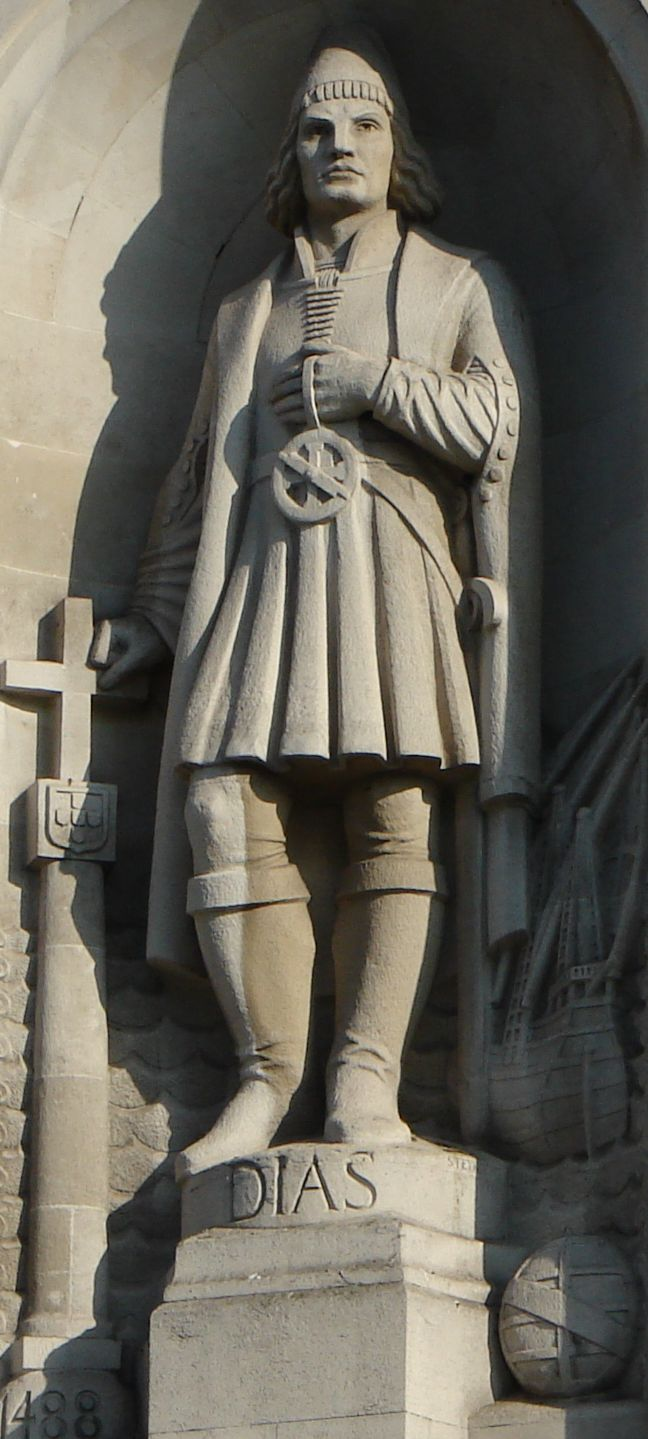
(Portugal) Bartolomeu Dias (c. 1450 – 1500) is known as the first European to sail around the southernmost tip of Africa in 1488, finding the eastern sea route to the Indian Ocean.

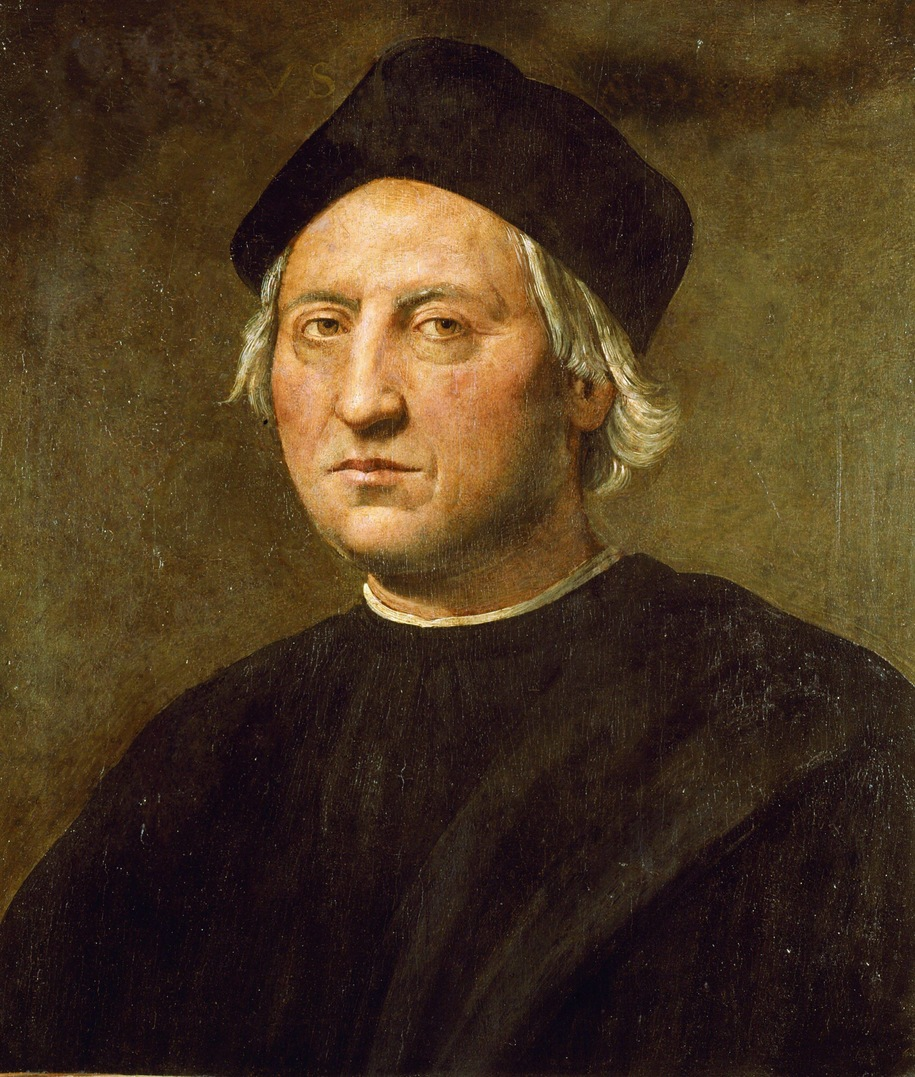
(Crown of Castile) Christopher Columbus (1451–1506) was an Italian explorer who led an expedition to the New World in 1492. His voyages are celebrated as the discovery of the Americas from a European perspective, and they opened a new era in the history of humankind and sustained contact between the two worlds.

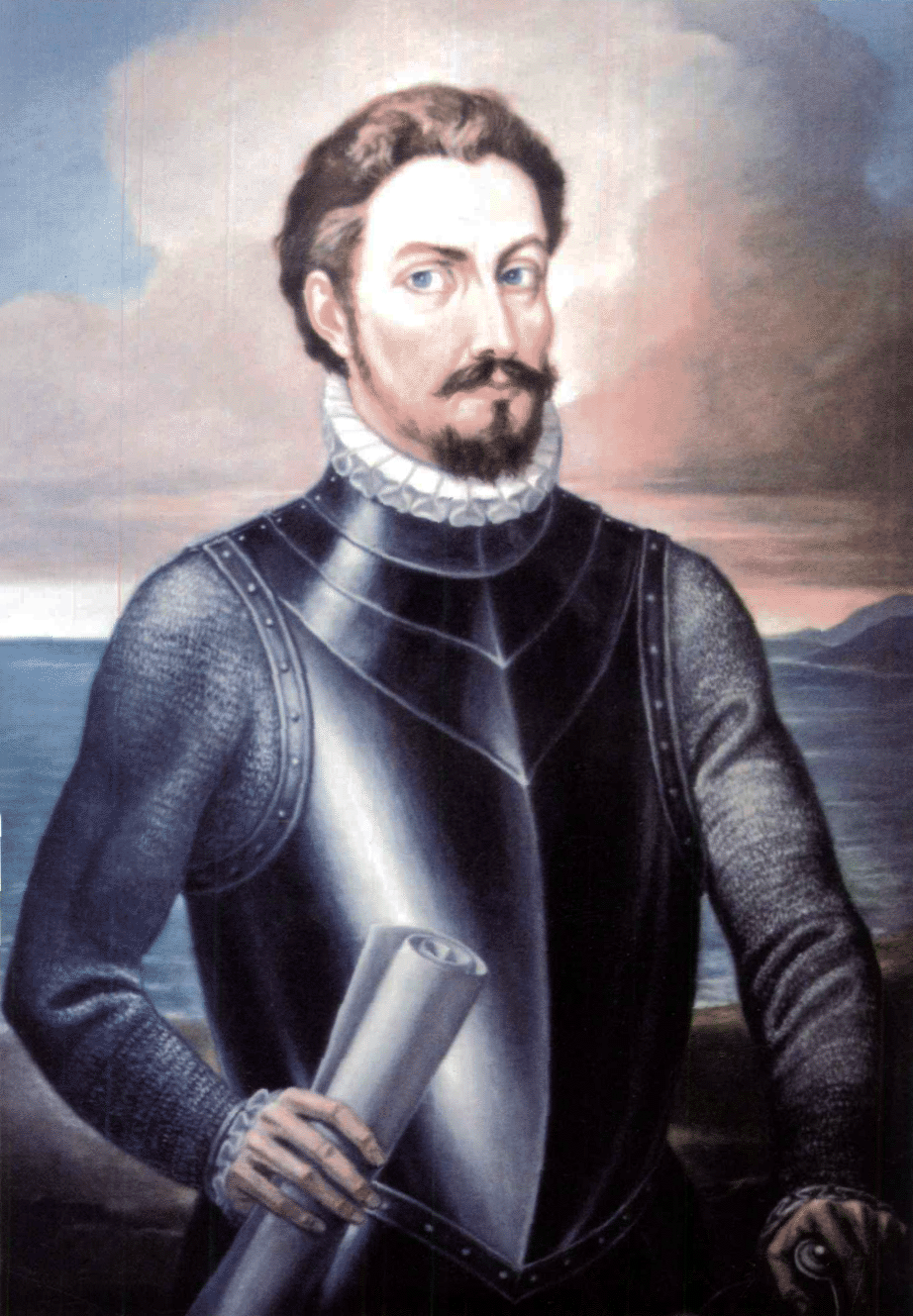
(Crown of Castile) Alonso de Ojeda (c. 1466 – c. 1515) is noted as the discoverer of South America, as commander of the fleet with Juan de la Cosa and Amerigo Vespucci.

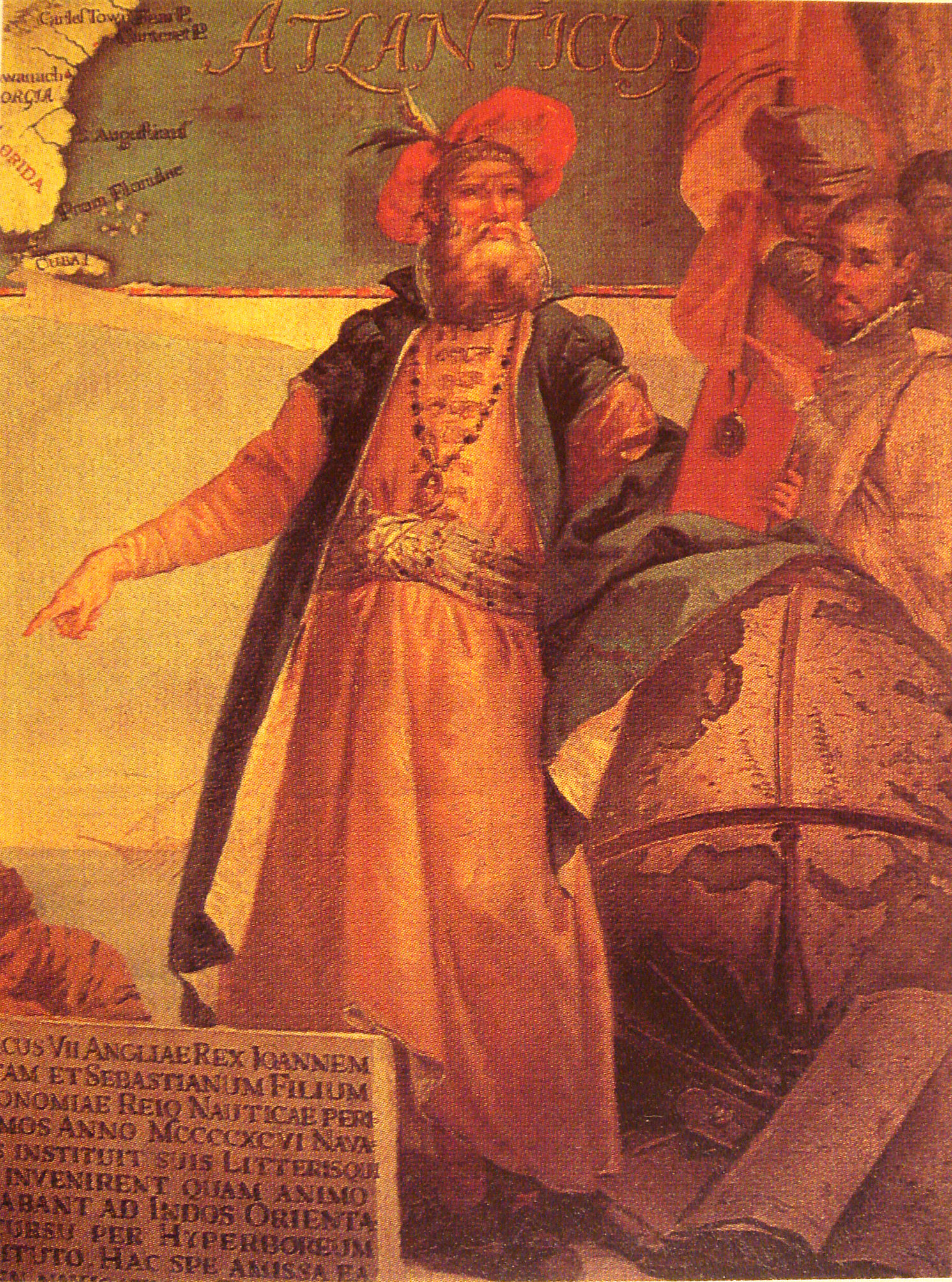
(England) John Cabot (c. 1450 – c. 1500) was an Italian navigator who was the first European that sailed along to North American coast in 1497 since the Norse 500 years prior.

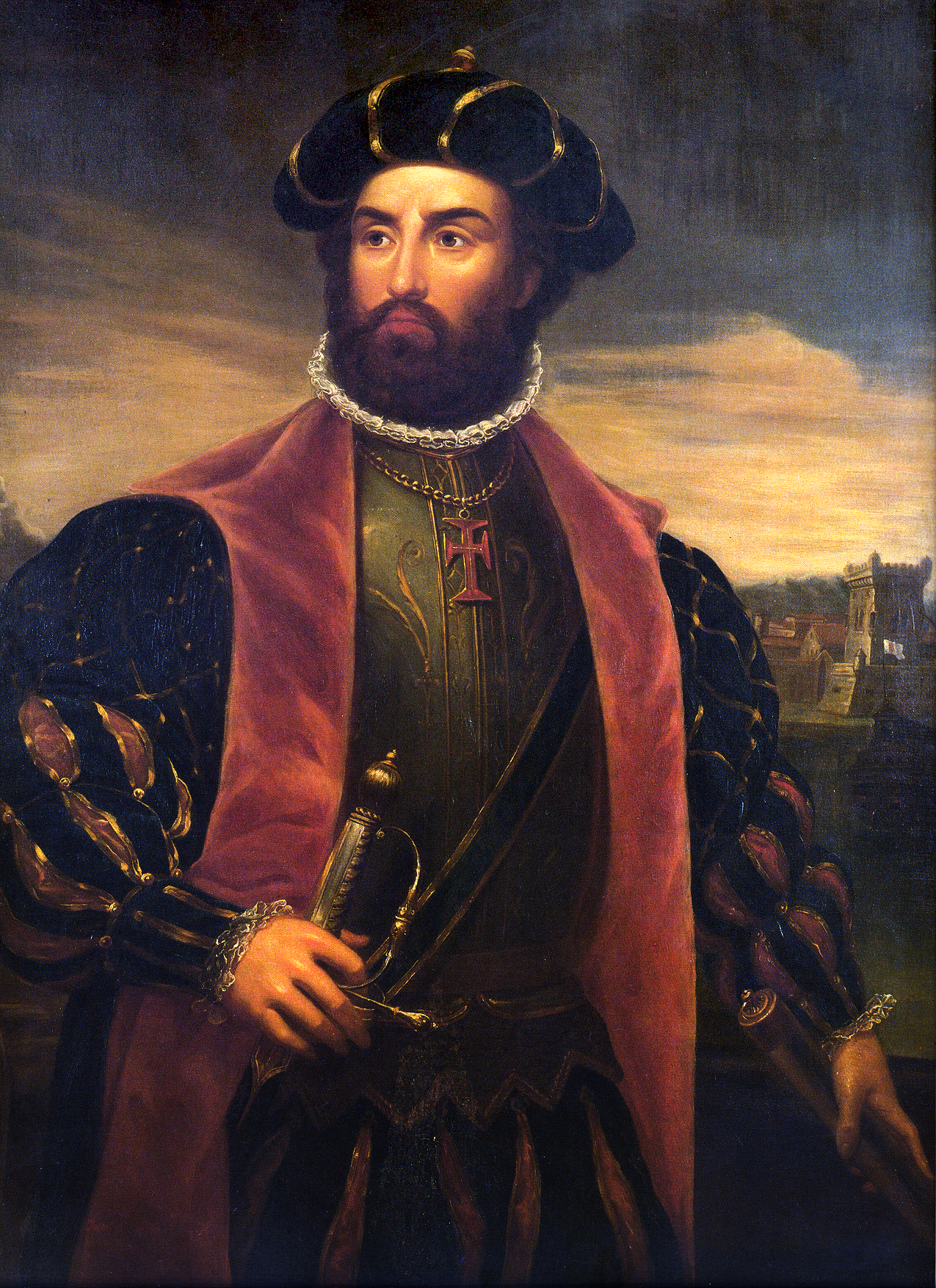
(Portugal) Vasco da Gama (c. 1460 – 1524). Famous Portuguese explorer who sailed to India in 1497–98. He accomplished finding a sea route to Asia which Europeans had been attempting to do for decades prior.

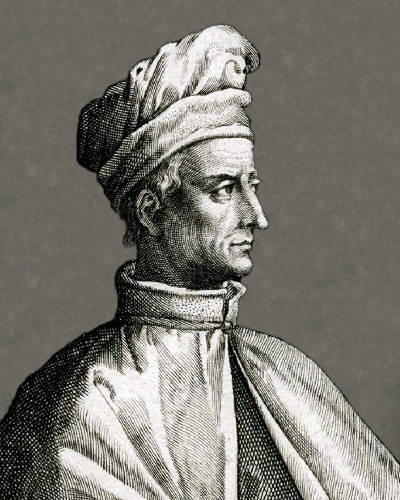
(Spain) (Portugal) Amerigo Vespucci (1451–1512). Italian navigator who made several trips to the New World. He is known for convincing the Europeans that the New World is not Asia, but an entirely new unknown continent. This new continent was soon named after him, America.

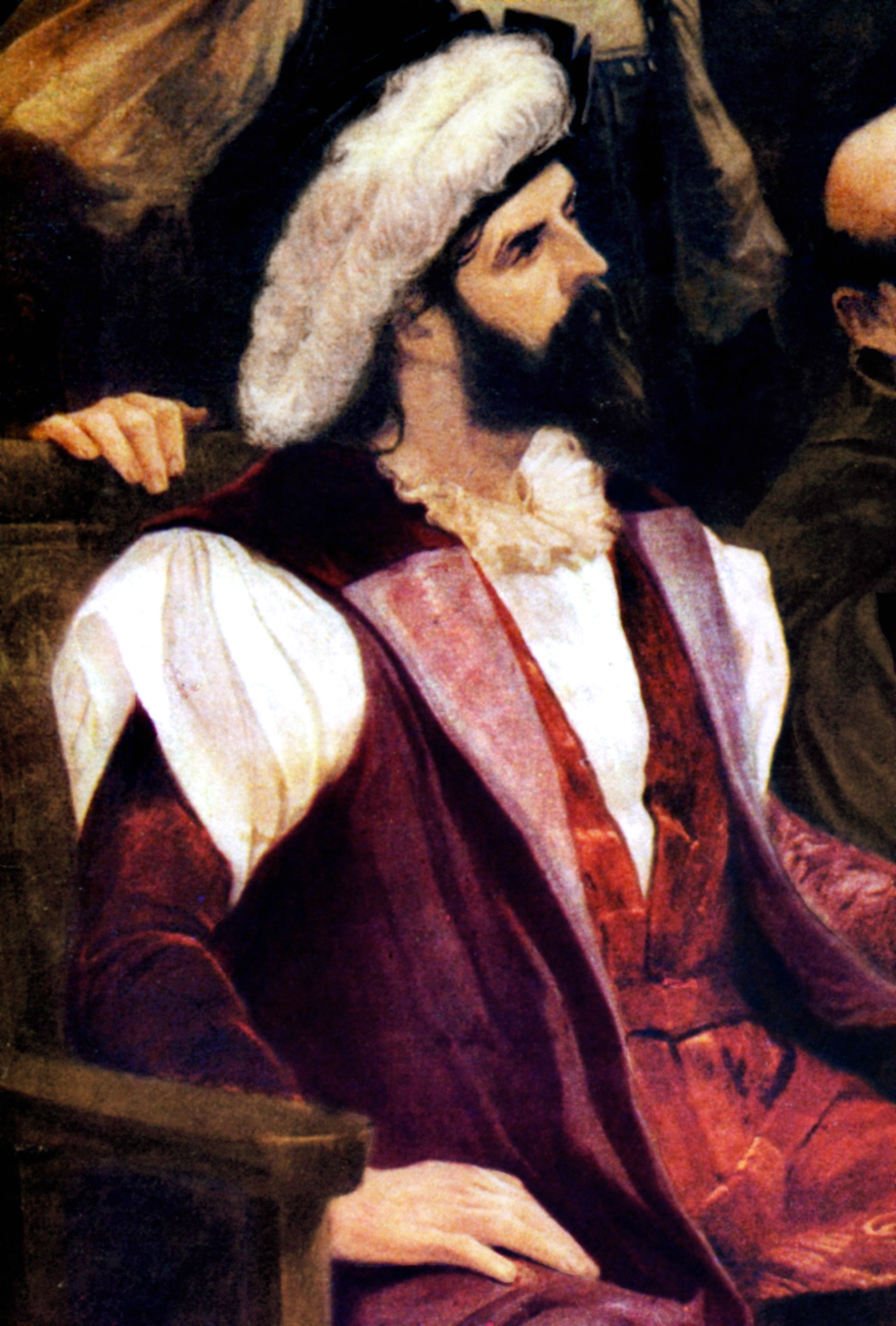
Pedro Álvares Cabral (c. 1467 – c. 1520) discovered the land in what is now Brazil in 1500 and claimed it for Portugal.

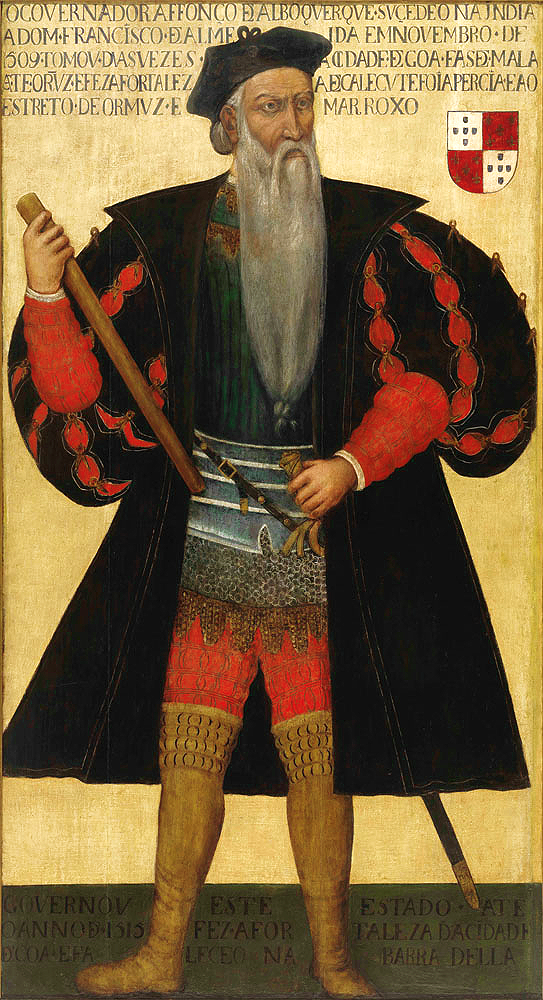
Afonso de Albuquerque (c. 1453 – 1515) raided, captured, and conquered many coastal cities in Asia that initiated Portugal's dominance in the Indian Ocean. He is also one of the first Europeans to sail to the East Indies and Spice Islands, along with Francisco Serrão and António de Abreu.

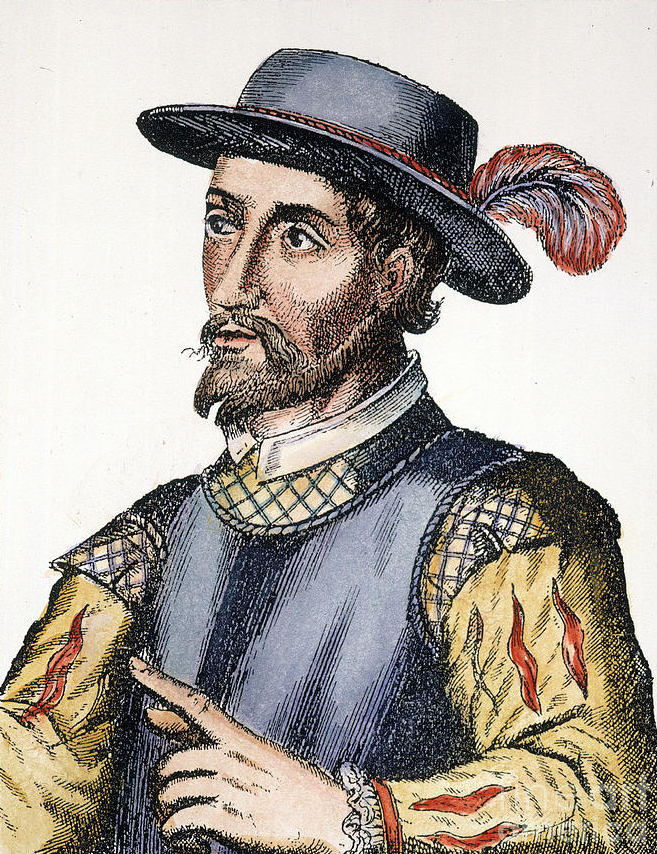
(Spain) Juan Ponce de León (1474–1521) was the first Governor of Puerto Rico and discovered Florida in 1513. He is the first known European to set foot on today's contiguous United States.

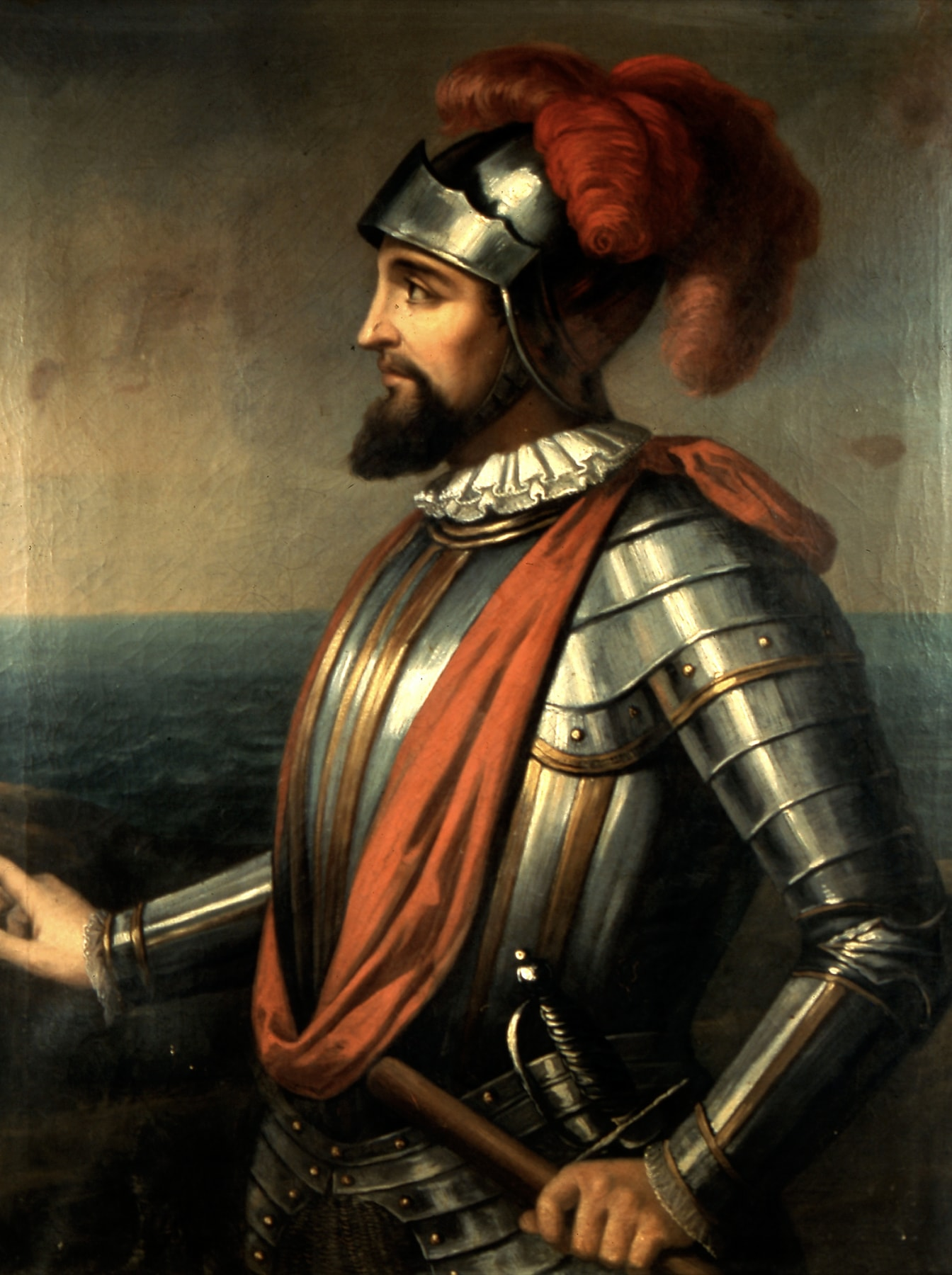
(Spain) Vasco Núñez de Balboa (c. 1475 – 1519) is known for having crossed the Isthmus of Panama to the Pacific Ocean in 1513, becoming the first European to reach and see the Pacific from the America's

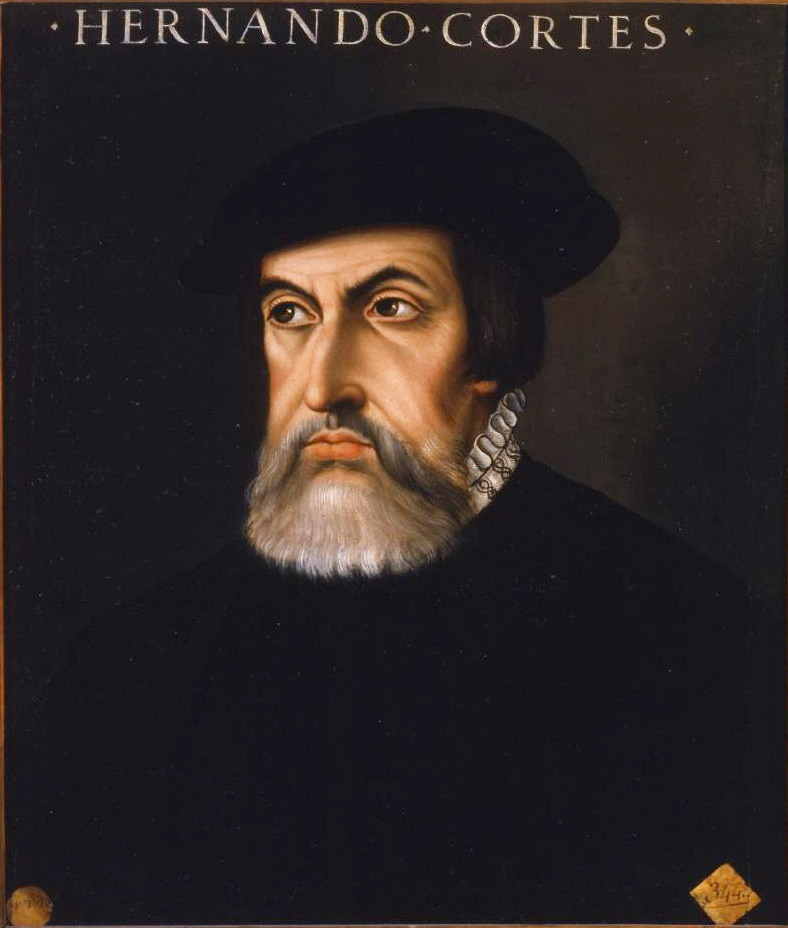
(Spain) Hernán Cortés (1485–1547). Famous Conquistador who led the Spanish expedition to explore and conquer the Aztec Empire (1519–1521).

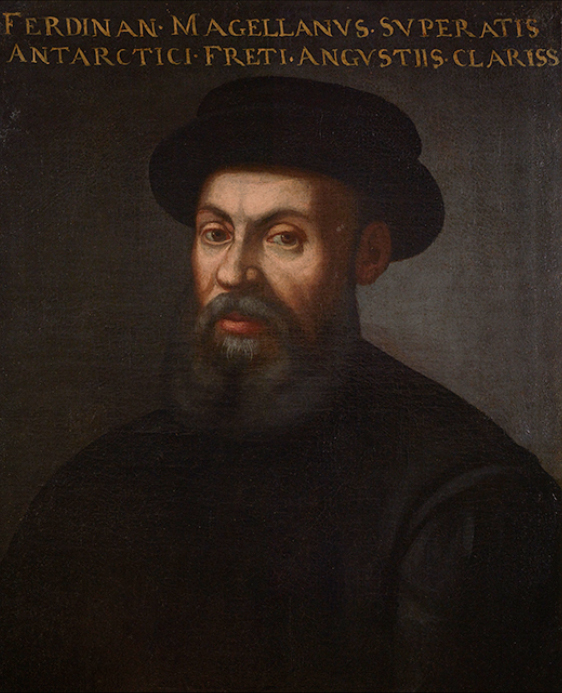
Ferdinand Magellan (1480–1521) was a Portuguese explorer who led the successful expedition under Spain to find a western sea route to Asia (1519–1521).

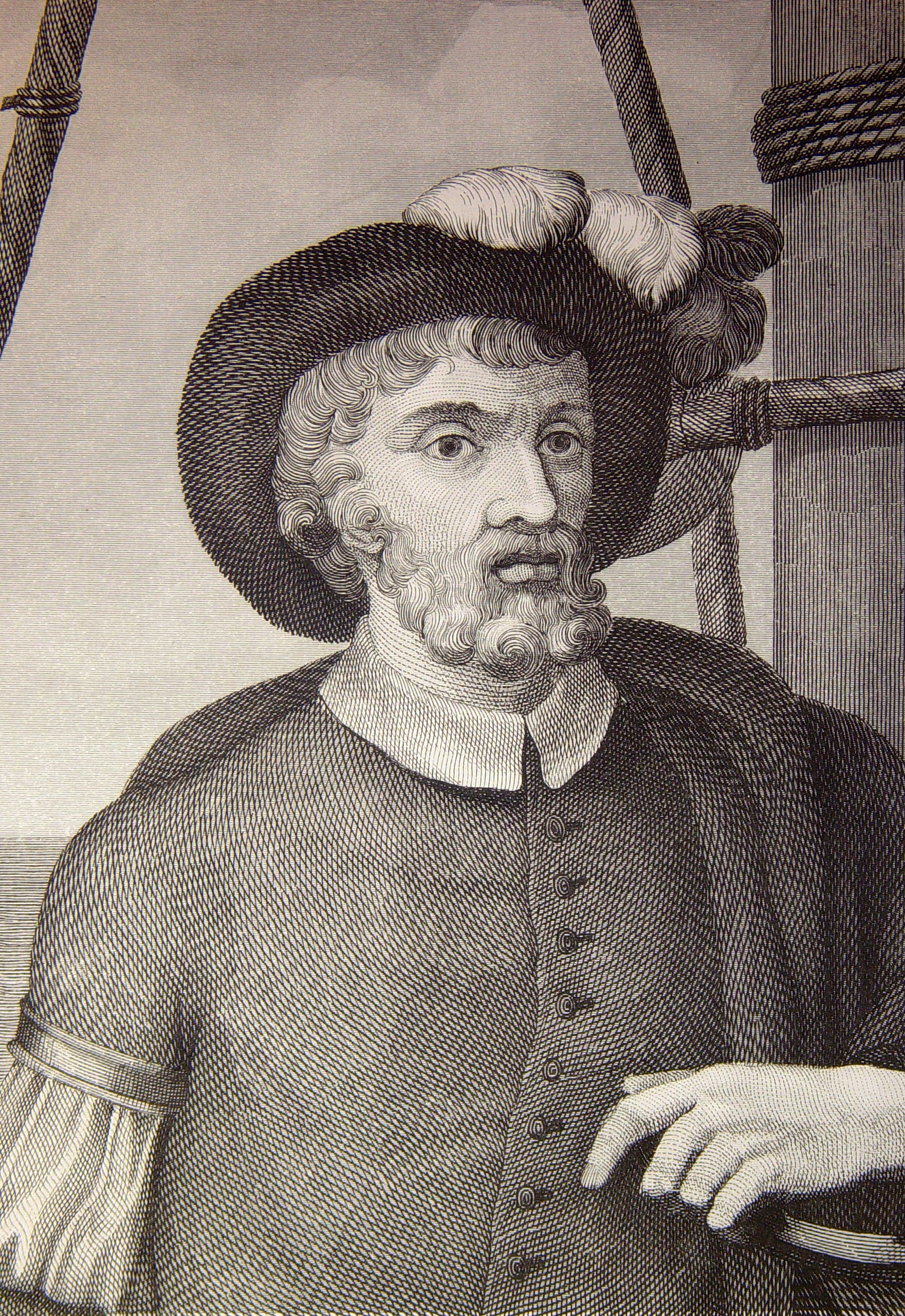
(Spain) Juan Sebastián Elcano (c. 1486 – 1526) took command after Ferdinand's death and completed the voyage, becoming the first person (along with 17 other crewmates) to circumnavigate the Earth.

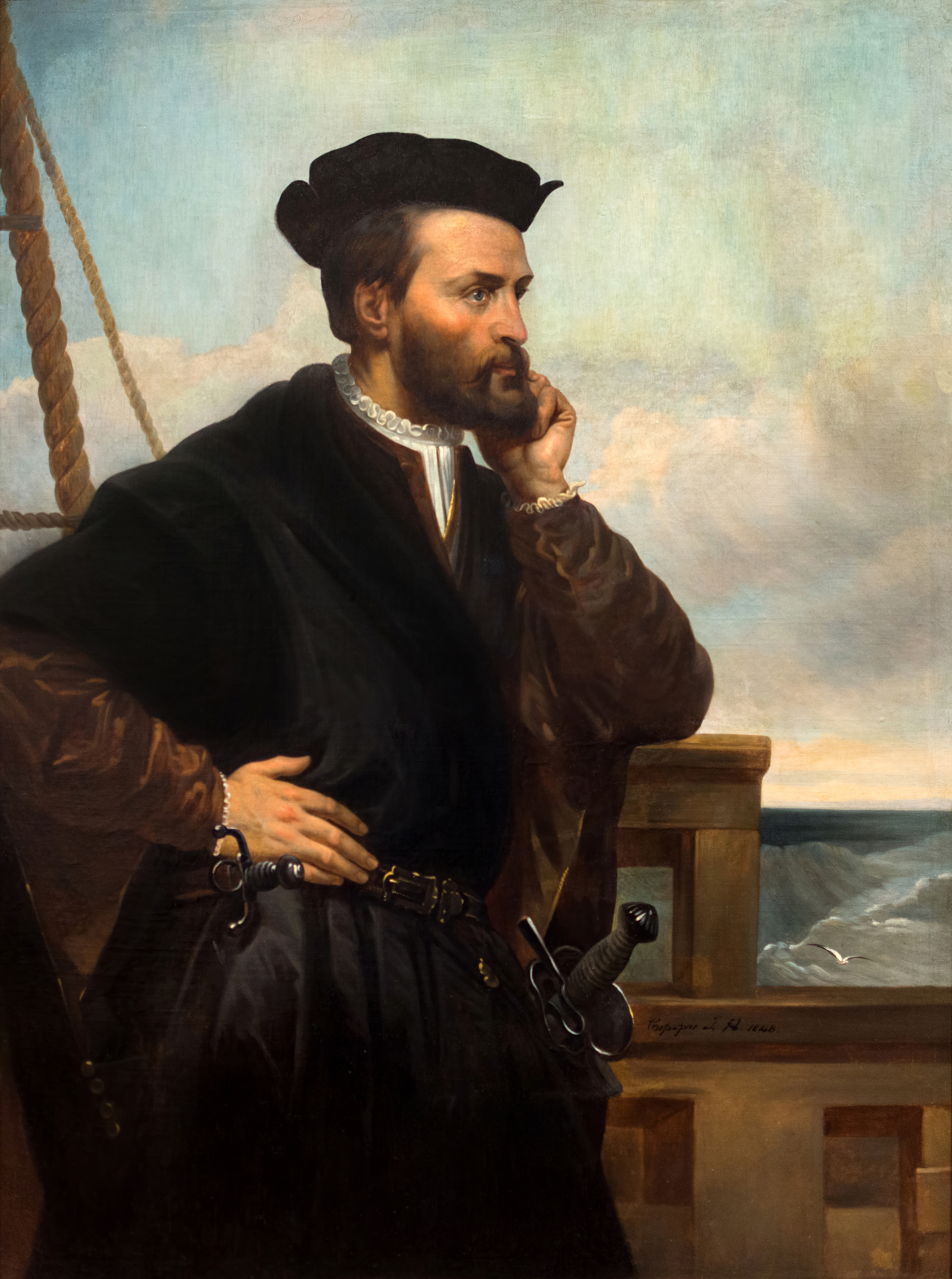
(Kingdom of France) Jacques Cartier (1491–1557) was the first European to travel inland in North America and claimed the lands he explored for France in 1534.

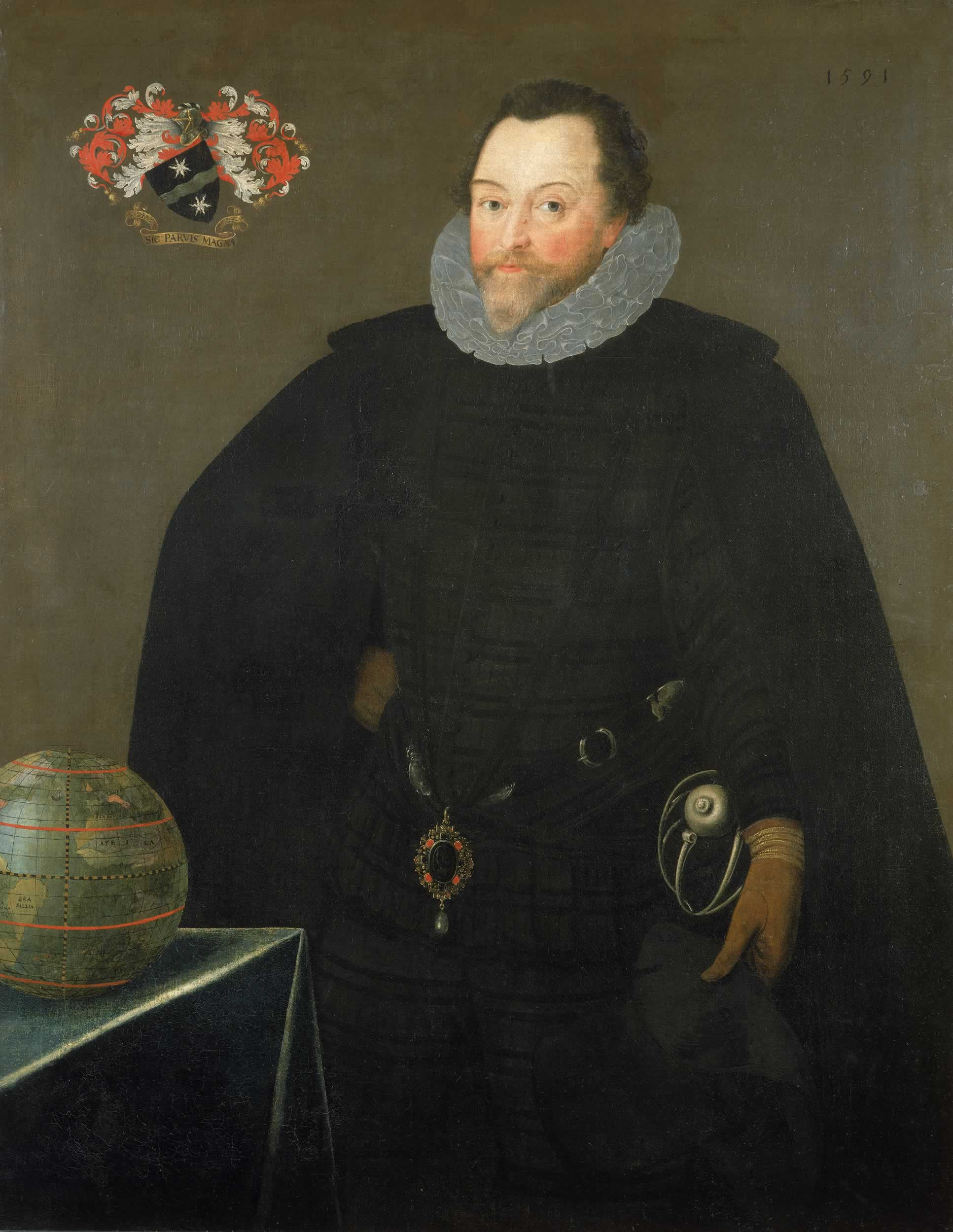
(England) Francis Drake (c. 1540 – 1596) was an English privateer who plundered many Spanish towns and ships in the Caribbean and elsewhere. However, he is most notable for completing the second circumnavigation of the world (1577–1580).

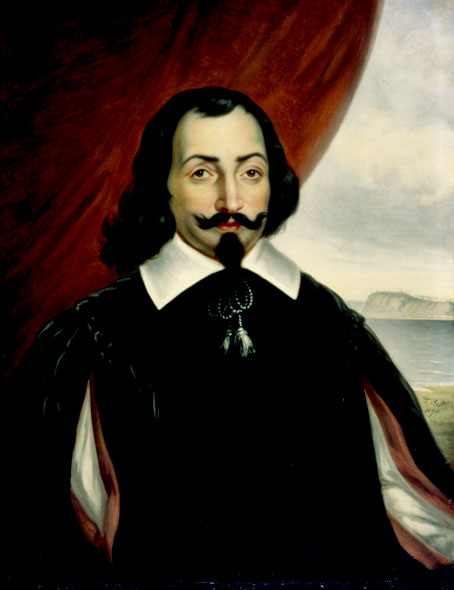
(Kingdom of France) Samuel de Champlain (1567–1635) is known as "The Father of New France". He founded the first permanent European settlements in Canada, and explored many lakes and rivers in the interior lands from early age to his death.

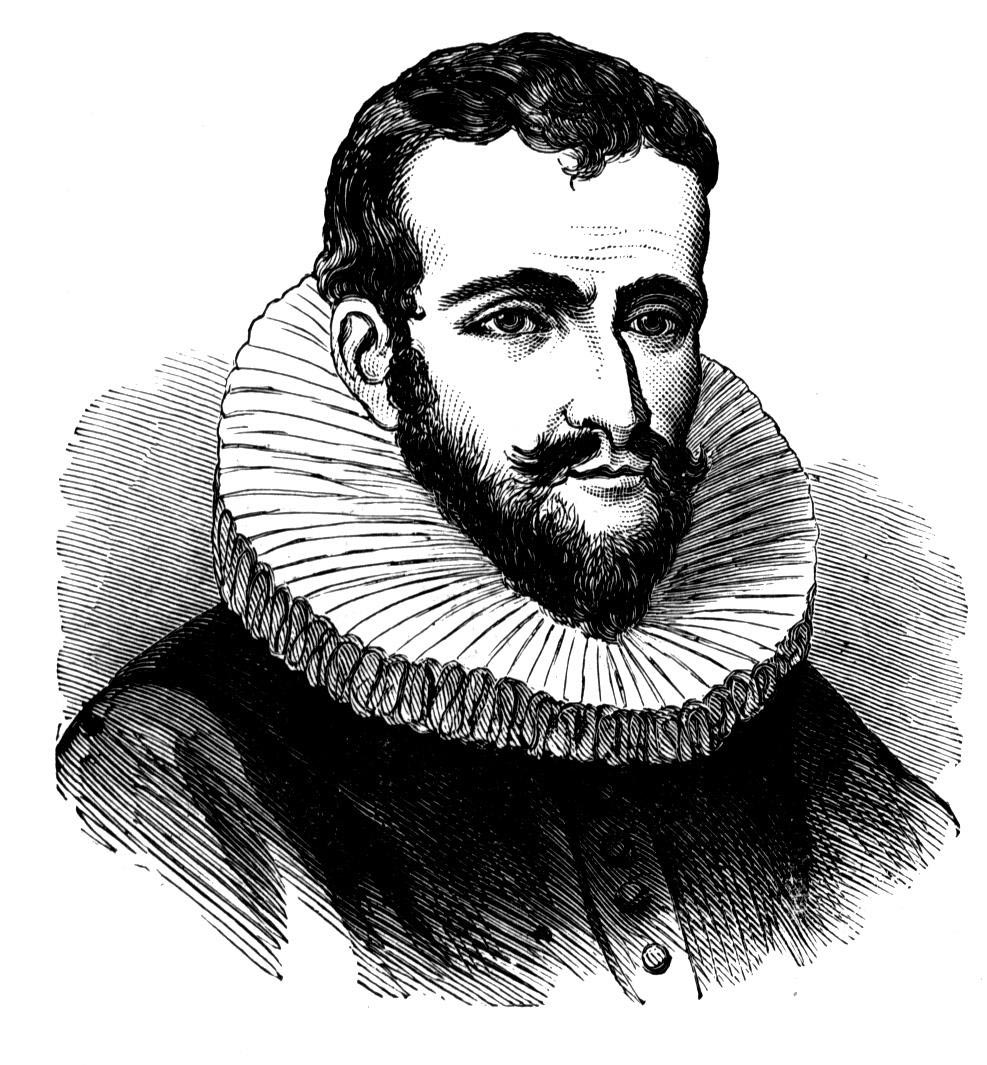
(Dutch Republic) (England) Henry Hudson (c. 1565 – c. 1611) explored what is now New York and northeastern Canada. Today he has both a river and bay named after him.

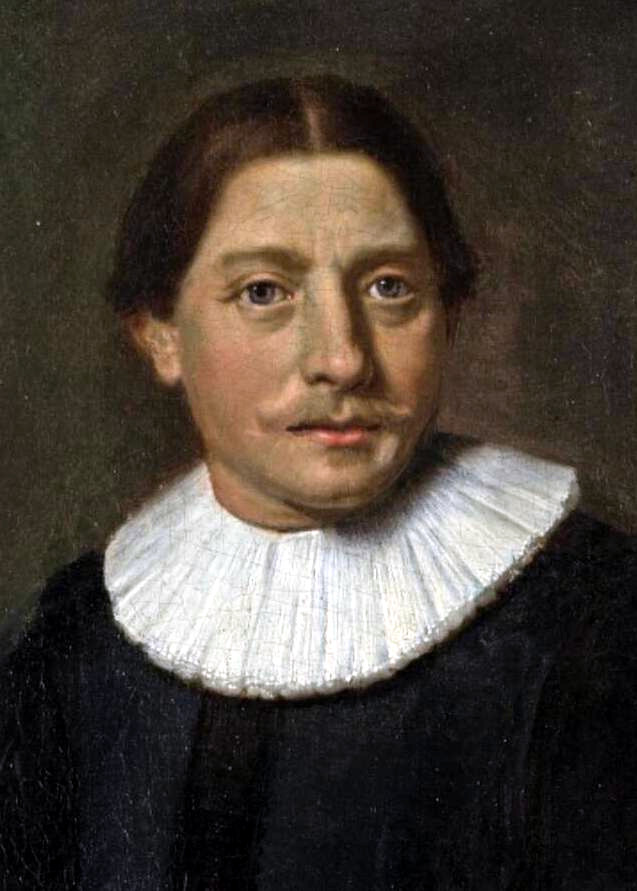
(Dutch Republic) Abel Tasman (1603–1659) was a Dutch seafarer who was the first known European to sight the islands of Tasmania (named after him), New Zealand, and Fiji (1642–43).

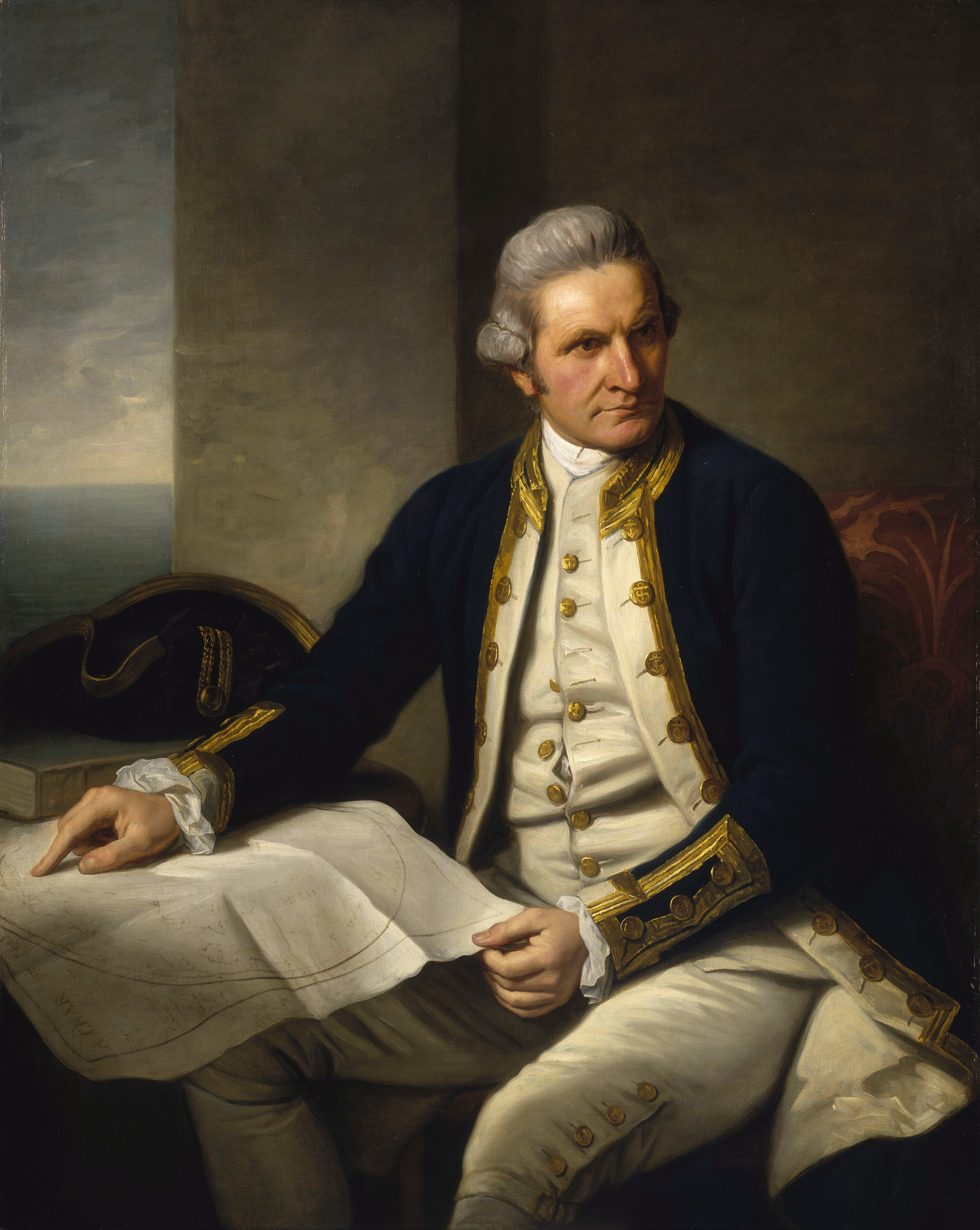
(Kingdom of Great Britain) James Cook (1728–1779). Famous British explorer who led three voyages to the Pacific. He is known for exploring and charting many islands in the ocean such as Polynesia, New Zealand, The Hawaiian Islands, and the eastern coast of Australia.

(United Kingdom) David Livingstone (1813–1873) is a Scottish explorer and missionary who sought to convert the locals to Christianity and expand British colonization, all the while discovering lakes and rivers within Africa's interior.

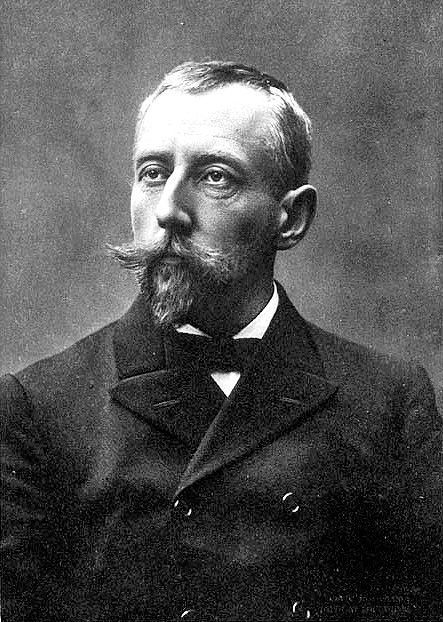
(Norway) Roald Amundsen (1872–1928) was a Norwegian explorer of the polar regions. He led the first successful expedition to the South Pole in 1911, and eventually also reached the North Pole by air in 1926.

Name	Modern (and former) nationality	Centuries	Main areas explored
António de Abreu	Portuguese	16th	Indonesia
Francisco Zeimoto	Portuguese	16th	Japan
Thomas Wyndham	English	16th	West Africa
Sir Richard Guildford	English	16th	Mediterranean Sea
William Adams	English	17th	Japan
Diogo Afonso	Portuguese	15th	Northwest African coast
Estevanico	Moroccan	16th	North America
Crispin Agnew	Scottish	20th	Greenland, Elephant Island, Northern Patagonian Icefield, Himalayas
Charles Albanel	French	17th	Canada (interior)
Afonso de Albuquerque	Portuguese	16th	Asia
Buzz Aldrin	American	20th	The Moon
Pero de Alenquer	Portuguese	15th/16th	Indian Ocean
Jean Alfonse (João Afonso)	Portuguese-French	15th/16th	Indian Ocean, Southeast Asia, possibly Australia; Brazil, North America
Benedict Allen	English	20th/21st	various
Diego de Almagro	Spanish	16th	Peru, Chile
László Almásy	Hungarian	19th/20th	Africa
Francisco de Almeida	Portuguese	16th	India
Lourenço de Almeida	Portuguese	16th	Sri Lanka, India
Pedro de Alvarado	Spanish	16th	Mexico, Guatemala, Honduras
Francisco Álvares	Portuguese	16th	Ethiopia
Gonçalo Álvares	Portuguese	15th	Gough Island, Namibia
Jorge Álvares	Portuguese	16th	China
Roald Amundsen	Norwegian	20th	South Pole, Antarctica, Northwest Passage
José Alberto de Oliveira Anchieta	Portuguese	19th	Gough Island
Charles John Andersson	Swedish	19th	Southern Africa
António de Andrade	Portuguese	16th/17th	India, Tibet
Fernão Pires de Andrade	Portuguese	16th	Ming China
Salomon August Andrée	Swedish	19th	Arctic
Roy Chapman Andrews	American	20th	China, Mongolia
Juan Bautista de Anza	Spanish	18th	California
Moncacht-Apé	Yazoo	17th/18th	North America
Dominick Arduin	French	20th/21st	North Pole
Henryk Arctowski	Polish	20th	Antarctic, South America
Neil Armstrong	American	20th	The Moon
Ingólfur Arnarson	Norse	9th	Iceland
Vladimir Arsenyev	Russian	20th	Far East
Michael Asher	English	20th	Africa
Pero de Ataíde	Portuguese	16th/17th	Indian Ocean
Vasco de Ataíde	Portuguese	16th/17th	India, Tibet
Vladimir Atlasov	Siberian Cossack	17th	Kamchatka Peninsula
François Xavier Aubry	French Canadian	19th	American Southwest
Väinö Auer	Finnish	20th	Tierra del Fuego and Patagonia
Pedro Menéndez de Avilés	Spanish	16th	Florida
Juan de Ayala	Spanish	18th	California
Lucas Vázquez de Ayllón	Spanish	16th	South Carolina
Diogo de Azambuja	Portuguese	15th	West African coast
George Back	English	19th	Canada (Arctic)
William Baffin	English	17th	Northwest Passage, Canada (Arctic)
Ralph Bagnold	British	20th	Libyan Desert
Abu Bakr II	Mali Empire	14th	Atlantic Ocean, trans-Atlantic (allegedly)
Samuel Baker	English	19th	Africa
Vasco Núñez de Balboa	Spanish	16th	Panama, 'discovered' the Pacific Ocean
Robert Ballard	American	20th	deep sea wrecks, Titanic
Ann Bancroft	American	20th/21st	Arctic, Antarctic
Joseph Banks	English	18th	Newfoundland and Labrador, South Pacific
Hong Bao	Chinese	15th	South Asia, Southeast Asia, Middle East, East African coast
Giosafat Barbaro	Italian	15th	Black Sea, Near East
Duarte Barbosa	Portuguese	15th/16th	Indian Ocean, 1st circumnavigation
Pero de Barcelos	Portuguese	15th/16th	North America
Afonso Gonçalves Baldaia	Portuguese	15th	Western Sahara
Jeanne Baré	French	18th/19th	Pacific Ocean
Willem Barentsz	Dutch	16th	Northeast Passage, Novaya Zemlya, Svalbard
Heinrich Barth	German	19th	Central and northern Africa
Robert Bartlett	Newfoundlander	20th	Arctic
William Bartram	American	18th	Southern United States
George Bass	English	18th	Australia, Tasmania
Henry Walter Bates	English	19th	Amazon basin
Abu Abdullah Muhammad Ibn Battuta	Marinid	14th	Africa, Central Asia, China, Europe, Indian subcontinent, Middle East, Russia, Southeast Asia
Nicolas Baudin	French	18th	Australia
James Beckwourth	American	19th	Sierra Nevada
William Beebe	American	20th	deep sea
Pyotr Beketov	Russian	17th	Siberia
Gertrude Bell	English	19th/20th	the region of Syria Mesopotamia Asia Minor Arabia
Fabian Gottlieb von Bellingshausen	Baltic German	19th	Antarctica
Joseph René Bellot	French	19th	Arctic
Móric Benyovszky	Hungarian	18th	northern Pacific Ocean
Vitus Bering	Russian (Danish-born)	18th	Northern Pacific Ocean, Bering Strait, Alaska (North America)
Jean de Béthencourt	French	15th	Canary Islands
Hiram Bingham III	American	20th	Machu Picchu, Peru
Laura Bingham	English	20th/21st	South America
Isabella Bird	English	19th/20th	North America, Hawaii, Japan, Korea, China, Vietnam, Singapore, Malaysia, India, Persia, Kurdistan, Turkey, Morocco
Stephen Bishop	American	19th	Mammoth Cave
John Blashford-Snell	English	20th/21st	various
Adriaen Block	Dutch	17th	East Coast of the United States
Nellie Bly	American	19th/20th	trip around the world in 72 days
Juan Francisco de la Bodega y Quadra	Spanish	18th	Pacific Northwest
Benjamin Bonneville	American	19th	Oregon Country, Great Basin
Daniel Boone	American	18th	Kentucky, Appalachian Mountains
Vittorio Bottego	Italian	19th	Somalia
Adam Brand	German	17th	Russia, China
Pierre Savorgnan de Brazza	Italian-French	19th	Congo
Saint Brendan	Irish	6th	Atlantic Ocean, Iceland
Jim Bridger	American	19th	Western United States
James Bruce	Scottish	18th	Algeria, the Middle East, Egypt
William S. Bruce	Scottish	20th	Antarctica
Jørgen Brønlund	Greenlandic	20th	Greenland
Étienne Brûlé	French	17th	Canada (interior)
Bungaree	Aboriginal Australian	18th/19th	Australian coasts
Lafayette Bunnell	American	19th	Yosemite Valley
Johann Ludwig Burckhardt	Swiss	19th	Middle East, Sudan
Robert O'Hara Burke	Irish	19th	Australia
Frederick Russell Burnham	American	19th/20th	Africa, Mexico
Richard Francis Burton	English	19th	East Africa
Thomas Button	Welsh	17th	Northwest Passage
José de Bustamante y Guerra	Spanish	18th	Pacific Ocean
Richard E. Byrd	American	20th	North Pole, Antarctica
Álvar Núñez Cabeza de Vaca	Spanish	16th	Southwestern United States, Mexico, Argentina
John Cabot	Italian	15th	North American mainland (Canada)
Sebastian Cabot	Italian	15th	Northwest Passage (Canada), Río de la Plata, Paraná River (South America)
João Cabral	Portuguese	16th	Bhutan & Nepal
Pedro Álvares Cabral	Portuguese	15th/16th	Brazil, Madagascar
Juan Rodríguez Cabrillo	Portuguese or Spanish	16th	California
Estêvão Cacella	Portuguese	16th	Himalayas
Alvise Cadamosto	Italian	15th	Cape Verde islands
Antoine de la Mothe Cadillac	French	18th	North America
René Caillié	French	19th	North Africa
Álvaro Caminha	Portuguese	15th	São Tomé and Príncipe islands
Pero Vaz de Caminha	Portuguese	15th	Brazil
Alberto del Canto	Portuguese	15th/16th	Northwestern Mexico
Diogo Cão	Portuguese	15th	west coast of Africa (including the Congo River)
Hermenegildo de Brito Capelo	Portuguese	19th	African continent
John Carpini	Italian	13th	Central Asia, Mongolia
Juan Carrasco	Spanish	18th	Pacific Northwest
Kate Marsden	British	19th-20th	Yakutia
Kit Carson	American	19th	Rocky Mountains, California, Oregon, Great Basin
Jan Carstensz	Dutch	17th	New Guinea coast, Gulf of Carpentaria
Jacques Cartier	French	16th	St. Lawrence River
João de Castro	Portuguese	15th	India, Arabian Peninsula & Red Sea
René-Robert Cavelier de La Salle	French	17th	Mississippi embayment
Bodhidharma	Indian/Persian	5th/6th	China and Southeast Asia (semi-legendary)
Thomas Cavendish	English	16th	Virginia, Pacific coast of Central and South America
Merieme Chadid	Moroccan, French	20th/21st	Antarctica, South America, Asia, Astronomer
Paul Du Chaillu	French	19th	Africa
Harriet Chalmers Adams	American	19th/20th	South America, Asia, South Pacific
Samuel de Champlain	French	16th/17th	Quebec, Great Lakes
Chang Chun	Chinese	13th	Central Asia, Mongolia
Jean Chardin	French	17th	Persia, India
Semion Chelyuskin	Russian	18th	Great Northern Expedition
Vasily Chichagov	Russian	18th	Northern Sea Route
Aleksei Chirikov	Russian	18th	Great Northern Expedition
Fletcher Christian	English	18th	Polynesia
Boris Chukhnovsky	Russian	20th	Arctic
Hugh Clapperton	Scottish	19th	west and Central Africa
William Clark	American	19th	Western United States
Gonçalo Coelho	Portuguese	15th/16th	South American coast
Nicolau Coelho	Portuguese	15th	Brazil
Frank Cole	Canadian	20th	Sahara
Bartholomew Columbus	Italian (Genoese)	15th/16th	Hispaniola, The Antilles
Christopher Columbus	Italian (Genoese)	15th/16th	Bahamas, Caribbean, Central America, South America (Colombia and Venezuela)
Diego Columbus	Portuguese	16th	Hispaniola (Mainly Dominican Republic)
George Comer	American	19th/20th	Arctic
Megasthenes	Greek	3rd BC	India
Niccolò Da Conti	Italian (Venetian)	15th	India, Southeast Asia
Frederick Cook	American	19th/20th	Arctic
James Cook	English	18th	Australasia, Oceania
Francisco Vásquez de Coronado	Spanish	16th	New Mexico
Mahinda	Indian	3rd BC	Sri Lanka
Diogo Álvares Correia	Portuguese	16th	Brazil
Gaspar Côrte-Real	Portuguese	16th	Newfoundland, Greenland
João Côrte-Real	Portuguese	15th	Azores, Newfoundland (Possible exploration of North America in 1473)
Miguel Côrte-Real	Portuguese	16th	Greenland, Newfoundland, Massachusetts
Hernán Cortés	Spanish	16th	Mexico
Juan de la Cosa	Spanish	15th/16th	Caribbean, South America
Thomas Coulter	Irish	19th	Mexico, Alta California
Jean Cousin	French	15th	Possibly the Americas around 1488. Possibly mouth of the Amazon River
Jacques-Yves Cousteau	French	20th	the deep sea
Pero da Covilhã	Portuguese	15th/16th	India, Ethiopia
Tom Crean	Irish	20th	Antarctica
Andrew Croft	English	20th	Arctic
Tristão da Cunha	Portuguese	16th	Tristan da Cunha islands
William Healey Dall	American	19th	Alaska, Yukon
William Dampier	English	17th/18th	Australia, Panama, many other locations
Alexandra David-Néel	French-Belgian	20th	Tibet (Traveled to Lhasa)
Isaac Davis	Welsh	18th	Hawaii
Faxian	Chinese	5th	India, Sri Lanka, and Southeast Asia
John Davis	English	16th	East Indies, Falkland Islands
Wang Dayuan	Chinese	14th	Southeast Asia, Singapore
Semyon Dezhnev	Russian	17th	Siberia, Bering Strait (80 years before Vitus Bering)
Bartolomeu Dias	Portuguese	15th	Africa
Dinis Dias	Portuguese	15th	Northwest African coast
Diogo Dias	Portuguese	16th	Madagascar, Somalia
Pero Dias	Portuguese	15th	African coast
Dicuil	Irish	8th	England, Scotland
Karl von Ditmar	Baltic German	19th	Kamchatka
Raphaël Domjan	Swiss	21st	various
Francis Drake	English	16th	Caribbean, Pacific Coast of North America
Gil Eanes	Portuguese	15th	Northwest African coast
Juan Sebastián Elcano	Spanish	16th	completed Ferdinand Magellan's circumnavigation
Francisco de Eliza	Spanish	18th	Strait of Juan de Fuca and Strait of Georgia
Lincoln Ellsworth	American	20th	Arctic and Antarctica
Franz Engel	German	19th	South America
Kaundinya	Indian	1st	Southeast Asia
Leif Eriksson	Norse Viking	11th	Vinland (Newfoundland) and North American mainland (Canada)
Erik the Red	Norse Viking	10th	Greenland
Pedro Escobar	Portuguese	15th	São Tomé and Príncipe islands
St Vincent Whitshed Erskine	British-South African	19th	Gazaland & Limpopo River
Eudoxus of Cyzicus	Greek	2nd BC	Indian Ocean, attempted circumnavigation of Africa
Euthymenes	Greek	6th BC	Northwest African coast
George Everest	Welsh	19th	India
Evliya Çelebi	Turkish	17th	Turkey, Egypt, Africa, Europe
Edward John Eyre	English	19th	Australia
Ahmad ibn Fadlan	Abbasid Caliphate	10th	Eastern Europe, Middle East, Russia
João Álvares Fagundes	Portuguese	16th	Newfoundland and Nova Scotia
Edmund Fanning	American	18th/19th	Oceania
Percy Harrison Fawcett	English	20th	Amazon rainforest
Álvaro Fernandes	Portuguese	15th	West African coast
Baltasar Fernandes	Portuguese	17th	Brazil
Duarte Fernandes	Portuguese	16th	Thailand
Juan Fernández	Spanish	16th	Juan Fernández Islands, Pacific Ocean
Salvador Fidalgo	Spanish	18th	Pacific Northwest
Peter Fidler	English	18th	Western Canada
Sir Ranulph Fiennes	English	20th/21st	Arctic, Antarctica
Matthew Flinders	English	18th/19th	Australia, Tasmania
Alexander Forbes	Scottish	19th	California
Peter Forsskål	Finnish	18th	Arabian Peninsula
John Franklin	English	19th	Northwest Passage
Simon Fraser	Scottish	18th/19th	British Columbia
Lançarote de Freitas	Portuguese	15th	Northwest African coast
John C. Frémont	American	19th	Oregon Trail, Sierra Nevada
Marc-Joseph Marion du Fresne	French	18th	Oceania
Louis de Freycinet	French	19th	Western Australia, Oceania
Martin Frobisher	English	16th	Northwest Passage, Canada
Afanasy Nikitin	Russian	15th	Ottoman Empire, Persia and India
Xu Fu	Chinese	3rd BC	Japan
Juan de Fuca	Greek-Spanish	16th	Strait of Juan de Fuca, Canada–United States border
Vivian Fuchs	English	20th	Antarctica
Alfons Gabriel	Austrian	20th	Iran
Yuri Gagarin	Soviet	20th	Earth orbit
Martín Galeano	Italian (Genoese)-Spanish	16th	Colombia
Dionisio Alcalá Galiano	Spanish	18th	Pacific Northwest
Juan Galindo	Spanish/Irish	19th	Mesoamerica (Mayan remains)
Estevão da Gama	Portuguese	16th	Trindade and Martim Vaz islands, Indian Ocean
João da Gama	Portuguese	16th	Hokkaido, Kuril islands, North Pacific, North America
Paulo da Gama	Portuguese	15th	sea route from Europe to India
Vasco da Gama	Portuguese	15th/16th	sea route from Europe to India
Pedro Sarmiento de Gamboa	Spanish	16th	Solomon Islands
Thomas Gann	Irish	19th/20th	Mesoamerica (Mayan remains)
Francisco Garcés	Spanish	18th	Southwestern United States, northwestern Mexico
Aleixo Garcia	Portuguese	16th	Brazil, Paraguay and Bolivia
Francisco García Jofre de Loaísa	Spanish	16th	Pacific Ocean
Francis Garnier	French	19th	Mekong River
Adrien de Gerlache	Belgian	19th/20th	Antarctica, Arctic
Romolo Gessi	Italian	19th	the Nile, Sudan
Humphrey Gilbert	English	16th	North America
Ernest Giles	Australian	19th	Central Australia
Diogo Gomes	Portuguese	15th	West African coast
André Gonçalves	Portuguese	15th/16th	Brazil
Antão Gonçalves	Portuguese	15th	West African coast
Lopes Gonçalves	Portuguese	15th	Atlantic Ocean
Binot Paulmier de Gonneville	French	15th/16th	Brazil (Santa Catarina)
James Augustus Grant	Scottish	19th	East Africa
João Grego	Portuguese	15th	African coast
Juan de Grijalva	Spanish	16th	Mexico, Nicaragua
Grigory Grum-Grshimailo	Russian	19th/20th	Central Asia, Tuva, Far East
Gonzalo Guerrero	Spanish	16th	Yucatán Peninsula
Mikhail Gvozdev	Russian	18th	First Kamchatka Expedition, Great Northern Expedition
Charles Gwynn	Irish	19th/20th	Sudan
Niels Peter Høeg Hagen	Danish	20th	Greenland
Hanno the Navigator	Carthaginian	6th BC	West African coast
Hannu	Egyptian	21st/20th BC	East Africa
Gonzalo López de Haro	Spanish	18th	Pacific Northwest
Alfred Harrison	English	20th	Arctic
Dirk Hartog	Dutch	17th	Western Australian coast
Ahmed Pasha Hassanein	Egyptian	20th	Oweinat and the Sahara
Ferdinand Vandeveer Hayden	American	19th	Rocky Mountains and the Western United States
Zheng He	Chinese	15th	South Asia, Southeast Asia, Middle East, East African coast
Samuel Hearne	English	18th	North Canada, Arctic
Bruno de Heceta	Spanish	18th	Pacific Northwest
Sven Hedin	Swedish	19th/20th	Central Asia
Matthew Alexander Henson	American	20th	Arctic
Louis Hennepin	Belgian-French	17th	North American interior
Pedro de Heredia	Spanish	16th	Northern Colombia
Bjarni Herjulfsson	Norse Viking	10th	North America
William Lewis Herndon	American	19th	Amazon basin
Herodotus	Greek	5th BC	Near East, Middle East, North Africa
Thor Heyerdahl	Norwegian	20th	anthropological ocean voyages
Sir Edmund Hillary	New Zealander	20th	Mount Everest, Antarctica
Himilco the Navigator	Carthaginian	6th BC	Northwestern coast of Europe
Hippalus	Greek	1st BC	Indian Ocean
Clement Hodgkinson	English	19th	New South Wales (Australia)
Pelham Aldrich	English	19th/20th	Arctic
Emil Holub	Czech	19th	Africa
Robert Hottot	French	20th	Congo River
Cornelis de Houtman	Dutch	16th	sea route from Europe to Indonesia
Frederick de Houtman	Dutch	16th/17th	Western Australian coast
William Hovell	English	19th	Southern New South Wales
Du Huan	Chinese	8th	Central Asia, Middle East, East African coast
Henry Hudson	English	17th	Northwest Passage, Hudson River and Hudson Bay
Alexander von Humboldt	German	19th	Latin America, Siberia
Hamilton Hume	Australian	19th	Australian interior
James S. Hutchinson	American	20th	Sierra Nevada
Hyecho	Korean	8th	India, Persia and Central Asia
João Infante	Portuguese	15th	African coast
Helge Ingstad	Norwegian	20th	Newfoundland, Greenland, Alaska
James Irwin	American	20th	The Moon
Kurbat Ivanov	Siberian Cossack	17th	Siberia, Russian Far East, discoverer of Lake Baikal
Roberto Ivens	Portuguese	19th	African continent
Cristóvão Jacques	Portuguese	16th	Paraná River, Brazil, Uruguay, Argentina
James of Ireland	Irish	14th	Sumatra, China
Willem Janszoon	Dutch	17th	Australia (Queensland)
Anthony Jenkinson	English	16th	Russia, Persia
Louis Jolliet	French Canadian	17th	Mississippi River
Jørgen Jørgensen	Danish	18th/19th	Tasmania
Friar Julian	Hungarian	13th	Volga Bulgaria
Conrad Carel Käyser	Dutch	20th	Suriname
Thorfinn Karlsefni	Icelandic	11th	Vinland
Johann Karl Ehrenfried Kegel	German	19th	Kamchatka
George Kennan	American	19th/20th	Russia
Edmund Kennedy	British-Australian	19th	Australian interior
Robert Kennicott	American	19th	Alaska, Siberia, Yukon and Northern Canada
Yerofey Khabarov	Russian	17th	Second Russian to explore the Amur region
Khashkhash Ibn Saeed Ibn Aswad	Andalusian	9th	Atlantic Ocean (possibly mythical)
Mary Kingsley	English	19th	Cameroon, Gabon, Congo, and other South West African regions
Eusebio Kino	Italian	17th/18th	Californias, Sonora and Arizona
Maria Klenova	Russian	20th	One of the founders of marine geology
Amyr Klink	Brazilian	20th	Antarctica
John Knight	English	17th	Greenland, Labrador
Johan Peter Koch	Danish	20th	Greenland
Alexander Kolchak	Russian	20th	Russian Arctic
Ferdinand Konščak	Croatian	17th	Baja California Peninsula
Fyodor Konyukhov	Russian	20th/21st	circumnavigation, Explorers Grand Slam, pole of inaccessibility
Otto von Kotzebue	Baltic German	19th	Pacific Ocean
Pyotr Kozlov	Russian	20th	Mongolia, Tibet
Johann Ludwig Krapf	German	19th	Ethiopia, Kenya
Pyotr Krenitsyn	Russian	18th	Alaska, Aleutian Islands, Kamchatka Peninsula
Adam Johann von Krusenstern	Baltic German	19th	First Russian circumnavigation
Francisco de Lacerda	Portuguese	18th	Zambia
Juan Ladrillero	Spanish	16th	Chile
Ernest Doudard de Lagrée	French	19th	Indochina, Mekong and Yunnan
Alexander Gordon Laing	Scottish	19th	West Africa (Niger River and Timbuktu)
Pierre Martin de La Martinière	French	17th	Norway, Lapland, northern Russia, Novaya Zemlya, Greenland and Iceland
Richard Lemon Lander	English	19th	West Africa (Niger and Benue Rivers)
Grigori Ivanovitch Langsdorff	Russian–German	19th	Brazil
Jean-François de Galaup, comte de La Pérouse	French	18th	Pacific Rim
Khariton Laptev	Russian	18th	Great Northern Expedition
Anthony de la Roché	English	17th	Antarctic (South Georgia)
Gadifer de la Salle	French	15th	Canary Islands
João Fernandes Lavrador	Portuguese	15th/16th	Labrador
Joseph N. LeConte	American	20th	Sierra Nevada
Albert von Le Coq	German	19th/20th	Central Asia
John Ledyard	American	18th	Australasia, Oceania, Russia
Miguel López de Legazpi	Spanish	16th	Philippines
Ludwig Leichhardt	German	19th	Australian interior
Jacob Le Maire	Dutch	17th	South Pacific (Cape Horn, Tonga Islands, Wallis and Futuna)
Gaspar de Lemos	Portuguese	15th	Brazil
Dragutin Lerman	Croatian	19th/20th	Congo
Mikhail Levashev	Russian	18th	Alaska, Aleutian Islands, Kamchatka Peninsula
Meriwether Lewis	American	18th/19th	Western United States
Sir Martin Lindsay, 1st Baronet	Scottish	20th	East Greenland
João de Lisboa	Portuguese	15th/16th	Indian Ocean, Brazil, Uruguay and Argentina
St. George Littledale	English	19th	Central Asia and North America
David Livingstone	Scottish	19th	Southern and East Africa
Louis-Philippe Loncke	Belgian	21st	Australia, the Andes and Iceland
Jim Lovell	American	20th	Outer Space
Alexander Mackenzie	Scottish Canadian	18th/19th	Canada
Ferdinand Magellan	Portuguese	15th/16th	1st circumnavigation, Philippines, Strait of Malacca, Indian Ocean
Jacques Mahu	French-Dutch	16th	Cape Verde islands
Alessandro Malaspina	Italian-Spanish	18th	Pacific Ocean
Teoberto Maler	German-Italian	19th	Mesoamerica (Mayan remains)
George Mallory	English	20th	Mount Everest
Lancelotto Malocello	Italian	13th/14th	Lanzarote (Canary Islands)
Albert Hastings Markham	British	19th	Arctic
Lourenço Marques	Portuguese	16th	Mozambique
Jacques Marquette	French	17th	Mississippi River
Álvaro Martins	Portuguese	15th	Newfoundland, Cape of Good Hope
Pedro Mascarenhas	Portuguese	16th	Indian Ocean, Diego Garcia
John Minor Maury	American	19th	Darién Gap
Douglas Mawson	Australian	20th	Antarctica
Robert McClure	Irish	19th	Arctic
Robert McCormick	British	19th	Arctic and Antarctic Oceans
Álvaro de Mendaña	Spanish	16th	Pacific Ocean
António Lopes Mendes	Portuguese	19th	Brazil, India
Cristóvão de Mendonça	Portuguese	16th	East Asia, Australasia
Pedro de Mendoza	Spanish	16th	South America
Jorge de Menezes	Portuguese	16th	Papua New Guinea
Archibald Menzies	Scottish	18th/19th	Pacific Ocean, circumnavigation
Alexander von Middendorff	Russian-Baltic German	19th	Siberia, Far East, Lapland, Fergana Valley
Ejnar Mikkelsen	Danish	20th	Greenland
Nicholas Miklouho-Maclay	Russian	19th	New Guinea
Thomas Mitchell	Scottish	19th	Australian interior
Richard Mohun	American	19th/20th	Congo Free State
Pierre Dugua, Sieur de Mons	French	16th/17th	North America
George Fletcher Moore	Irish	19th	Australia
John Moresby	English	19th	New Guinea coast
Ivan Moskvitin	Russian	17th	First European to reach the Sea of Okhotsk
António Mota	Portuguese	16th	Japan
Henri Mouhot	French	19th	South East Asia
Francisco Antonio Mourelle	Spanish	18th	Pacific Northwest and Pacific Ocean
Bimal Mukherjee	Indian	20th	circumnavigation
Ludvig Mylius-Erichsen	Danish	20th	Greenland
Gustav Nachtigal	German	19th	Africa
Naddoddur	Norse Viking	9th	Iceland
Nain Singh Rawat (Pundit Brothers)	Indian	19th	Tibet, Himalayas and Central Asia
Fridtjof Nansen	Norwegian	19th/20th	Arctic
José María Narváez	Spanish	18th	Pacific Northwest
Nearchus	Greek	4th BC	Arabian Sea, Persian Gulf
Nehsi	Egyptian	15th BC	Land of Punt
Arthur Henry Neumann	English	19th	Africa
Gennady Nevelskoy	Russian	19th	Sakhalin
Jean Nicolet	French	17th	Northwest Territory (United States)
Joseph Nicollet	French-American	19th	Mississippi and Missouri Rivers
António Noli	Portuguese	15th	Cape Verde islands
Adolf Erik Nordenskiöld	Finnish	19th	Arctic
Tenzing Norgay	Nepalese	20th	Mount Everest
Fernão de Noronha	Portuguese	15th/16th	Atlantic Ocean
João da Nova	Galician-Portuguese	16th	Atlantic and Indian Oceans
Paulo Dias de Novais	Portuguese	16th	Angola
Kazimierz Nowak	Polish	20th	Africa
Vanessa O'Brien	American and British	20th/21st	Mountaineering and Challenger Deep in Marianas Trench
Sebastián de Ocampo	Spanish	16th	Caribbean, Gulf of Mexico
Addison O'Dea	American	21st	The Sahara
Odoric of Pordenone	Italian	14th	Persia, India and China
Peter Skene Ogden	Canadian	19th	Snake River country, Western United States
Alonso de Ojeda	Spanish	15th/16th	South America (north), Caribbean
Juan de Oñate	Spanish	16th	American Southwest
Francisco de Orellana	Spanish	16th	South America, Amazon River
Simone Orlandini	Italian	21st	Arctic, Tibet
Íñigo Órtiz de Retes	Spanish	16th	Papua New Guinea
John Oxenham	English	16th	Panama, Pacific Ocean
John Oxley	English	19th	Australia
Pedro Páez	Spanish	16th/17th	Ethiopia
Juan Pardo	Spanish	16th	Southeastern United States
Mungo Park	Scottish	18th/19th	West Africa (Niger River)
William Parry	English	19th	Arctic
James Ohio Pattie	American	19th	Western United States
Fiann Paul	Icelandic	21st	Arctic, Antarctic, Oceans
Nathaniel Pearce	English	19th	Ethiopia
Robert Peary	American	19th/20th	Arctic
Paul Pelliot	French	19th/20th	central Asia
Diogo Fernandes Pereira	Portuguese	15th/16th	Madagascar, Mascarenes (Réunion, Mauritius, and Rodrigues)
Duarte Pacheco Pereira	Portuguese	15th	Atlantic Ocean, Brazil
Bartolomeu Perestrelo	Portuguese	15th	Madeira Islands
Juan Pérez	Spanish	18th	Pacific Northwest
Maksim Perfilyev	Siberian Cossack	17th	Eastern Siberia, first Russian to reach Transbaikalia
Ivan Petlin	Siberian Cossack	17th	First Russian to reach China
Auguste Piccard	Swiss	20th	Earth's atmosphere, the deep sea
Jacques Piccard	Swiss	20th	the deep sea
Antonio Pigafetta	Italian (Venetian)	16th	Survived the 1st circumnavigation of the world
Zebulon Pike	American	19th	Louisiana Purchase (United States)
Alonso Alvarez de Pineda	Spanish	16th	Gulf Coast
Fernão Mendes Pinto	Portuguese	16th	India, Far East, Japan
Serpa Pinto	Portuguese	19th	Southern Africa
Martin Alonzo Pinzón	Spanish	15th	Caribbean
Vicente Yáñez Pinzón	Spanish	15th/16th	Caribbean, Brazil
Luís Pires	Portuguese	15th	abortive voyage to Brazil
Francisco Pizarro	Spanish	16th	Hispaniola, Panama, Peru
Fernão do Pó	Portuguese	15th	West African coast
Marco Polo	Italian (Venetian)	13th/14th	China, Mongol Empire, India
Juan Ponce de León	Spanish	15th/16th	Florida
Peter Pond	American	18th/19th	Canada interior
Fedot Popov	Russian	17th	The first European expedition through the Bering Strait
António da Silva Porto	Portuguese	19th	Angola interior
Gaspar de Portolà	Spanish	18th	Alta and Baja California
Posidonius	Greek	1st BC	Gaul
Sydney Possuelo	Brazilian	20th/21st	Amazon
Panayotis Potagos	Greek	19th	Africa
Grigory Potanin	Russian	19th	Inner Asia
John Wesley Powell	American	19th	Western United States
Vassili Poyarkov	Russian	17th	First Russian explorer of the Amur region
Mandil Pradhan	Nepalese	21st	Himalayas
Gavriil Pribylov	Russian	18th	Pribilof Islands
Vasili Pronchishchev	Russian	18th	Great Northern Expedition
Tatiana Pronchishcheva	Russian	18th	The first female Arctic explorer
Nathaniel Hale Pryor	American	19th	western United States
Nikolai Przhevalsky	Russian	19th	Central Asia
Peter Puget	English	19th	Puget Sound
Pytheas	Greek	4th BC	Northern Europe
Zhang Qian	Chinese	2nd BC	Central Asia
Pedro Fernandes de Queirós	Portuguese	16th/17th	Oceania
Gonzalo Jiménez de Quesada	Spanish	16th	From Santa Marta to the Bogotá savanna; quest for El Dorado
Hernán Pérez de Quesada	Spanish	16th	Caquetá, Colombia; quest for El Dorado
Manuel Quimper	Spanish	18th	Pacific Northwest
Emil Racoviță	Romanian	19th/20th	Antarctica
John Rae	Scottish Canadian	19th	Northwest Passage, Canada (Arctic)
Sir Walter Raleigh	English	16th/17th	Virginia, Orinoco River
Knud Rasmussen	Danish	20th	Arctic
Piri Reis	Turkish	15th/16th	Mediterranean Sea
Matteo Ricci	Italian	16th	China
Mario Rigby	Turks and Caicos Islander	21st	Africa
Arthur Rimbaud	French	19th	Horn of Africa (Abyssinia)
Luigi Robecchi	Italian	19th	Africa
Diogo Rodrigues	Portuguese	16th	Mascarene Islands
Nicholas Roerich	Russian	20th	Central Asia, Northeast Asia
Jacob Roggeveen	Dutch	18th	South Pacific (Easter Island)
Cândido Rondon	Brazilian	19th/20th	Brazilian interior (Amazon Basin)
James Clark Ross	English	19th	Arctic, Antarctic
Sir John Ross	Scottish	19th	Arctic
John Ross	Scottish Australian	19th	Northern Territory
William of Rubruck	Flemish	13th	Central Asia
Nikolay Rudanovsky	Russian	19th	Sakhalin
Henry Russell	Irish	19th	Pyrenees
Ahmad ibn Rustah	Persian	10th	Russia, Scandinavia, Arabia
João de Sá	Portuguese	15th/16th	India, African coast
Álvaro de Saavedra	Spanish	16th	Papua New Guinea, Caroline Islands, Marshall Islands
Edward Sabine	Irish	19th	Arctic
Sacagawea	Lemhi Shoshone	18th/19th	Western United States
Anatoly Sagalevich	Russian	20th/21st	Explorer of the World Ocean, seabed at the North Pole
Kira Salak	American	20th/21st	Papua New Guinea, Mali, Bhutan
Alonso de Salazar	Spanish	16th	Marshall Islands, Pacific Ocean
Agustín Lizárraga	Peruvian	20th	Machu Picchu
Gadiel Sánchez Rivera	Peruvian	21st	Amazon, Lake Titicaca
Sándor Kőrösi Csoma	Hungarian	19th	Tibet
Yakov Sannikov	Russian	19th	New Siberian Islands
João de Santarém	Portuguese	15th	São Tomé and Príncipe islands
Gavril Sarychev	Russian	18th/19th	Sea of Okhotsk, Baltic Sea, Aleutian Islands
Martin Sauer	English	18th	Siberia, Alaska
Rabban Bar Sauma	Turco-Mongol	13th	Europe, Middle East
Johann Schiltberger	German	15th	Central Asia
Adolf Schlagintweit	German	19th	Central Asia
Eduard Schlagintweit	German	19th	Central Asia
Emil Schlagintweit	German	19th	Central Asia
Hermann Schlagintweit	German	19th	Central Asia
Robert Schlagintweit	German	19th	Central Asia
Ulrich Schmidl	German	16th	Río de la Plata
Willem Schouten	Dutch	17th	South Pacific (Cape Horn, Tonga Islands, Wallis and Futuna)
Georg August Schweinfurth	Baltic German	19th	East and Central Africa
Robert Falcon Scott	English	19th/20th	Antarctica (South Pole)
Scylax of Caryanda	Greek	6th BC	Indus River, Indian Ocean, Red Sea
Tibor Sekelj	Croat	20th	Argentina
Mirko and Stjepan Seljan	Croat	20th	Ethiopia, South America
Frederick Courtney Selous	English	19th	Africa
Symon Semeonis	Hiberno-Norman	14th	Jerusalem, Albania
Gomes de Sequeira	Portuguese	16th	Caroline Islands, Pacific Ocean
João Serrão	Portuguese	15th/16th	1st Circumnavigation (also later its co-captain general); commanded the ship Santiago in the Atlantic and the Concepcion across the Pacific, Strait of Malacca, Indian Ocean
Francisco Serrão	Portuguese	15th/16th	Indonesia
Ernest Shackleton	English-Irish	20th	Antarctica
Robert Barkley Shaw	English	19th	Central Asia
Eric Shipton	English	20th	Mount Everest, southern Patagonia
Tanaka Shōsuke	Japanese	17th	Mexico
Diogo Silves	Portuguese	15th	Azores
James Simpson	English	20th	North Greenland
Pero de Sintra	Portuguese	15th	West African coast, Sierra Leone
Pierre-Jean De Smet	Belgian	19th	North America
Jedediah Smith	American	19th	Western United States, Rocky Mountains
John Smith	English	17th	North America
William Smith	English	19th	South Shetland Islands
Eugene Smurgis	Russian	20th	Arctic Ocean
J. Dewey Soper	Canadian	20th	Canadian Arctic
Hernando de Soto	Spanish	16th	Central America, Southern United States
Martim Afonso de Sousa	Portuguese	16th	Brazilian interior
John Hanning Speke	English	19th	East Africa
Hans Staden	German	16th	Brazil
Ed Stafford	English	21st	Amazon
William Grant Stairs	Canadian	19th	Central Africa
Henry Morton Stanley	Welsh	19th	East Africa
Vilhjalmur Stefansson	Icelandic Canadian	20th	Canadian Arctic
Marc Aurel Stein	Hungarian-British	19th/20th	Central Asia
John Lloyd Stephens	American	19th	Middle East, Mesoamerica (Mayan remains)
Paweł Strzelecki	Polish-British	19th	the Americas, Australia (Gippsland)
John McDouall Stuart	Scottish	19th	Australian Interior
Charles Sturt	British	19th	Australian Interior
Gardar Svavarsson	Swedish	9th	Iceland
Anders Svedlund	Swedish	20th	Oceans
Otto Sverdrup	Norwegian	19th/20th	Arctic
Ignacije Szentmartony	Croat	18th	Amazon River
Abel Tasman	Dutch	17th	Australasia, including Tasmania
António Raposo Tavares	Portuguese	17th	Paraguay River, part of the Andes mountain range, Grande River, Mamoré River, Madeira River, Amazon River (Brazil, Paraguay, Bolivia) Union of La Plata Basin to the Amazon River – circumnavigation of Brazil.
Jean-Baptiste Tavernier	French	17th	Persia, India
Mikhail Tebenkov	Russian	19th	Alaska, Aleutian Islands, Amur River
Pedro Teixeira	Portuguese	17th	Amazon River
Tristão Vaz Teixeira	Portuguese	15th	Madeira Islands
Wilfred Thesiger	English	20th	Africa, Middle East
David Thompson	Welsh–English	18th/19th	Western Canada, Pacific Northwest
Guðríður Þorbjarnardóttir	Icelandic	11th	North America
Harold William Tilman	English	20th	Himalayas, Patagonia
Yermak Timofeyevich	Russian	16th	Siberia
Tenjiku Tokubei	Japanese	17th	South East Asia, India
Eduard Toll	Baltic German	19th	Arctic
Luis Váez de Torres	Spanish Galician	16th/17th	Australasia
Nuno Tristão	Portuguese	15th	West African coast, Guinea-Bissau
Petrus Johannes Truter	Dutch	19th	Bechuanaland
Hasekura Tsunenaga	Japanese	17th	Mexico, Europe
Benjamin of Tudela	Jewish Navarrese	12th	Mediterranean Sea, Arabian Peninsula, Red Sea, Persian Gulf
Andrés de Urdaneta	Spanish	16th	Pacific Ocean, Manila Galleon route
Jules Dumont d'Urville	French	19th	Antarctica
Cayetano Valdés y Flores	Spanish	18th	Pacific Northwest
George Vancouver	English	18th	Pacific coast of North America
Ludovico di Varthema	Italian	15th/16th	Arabian Peninsula, Indian Ocean, Southeast Asia
Gonçalo Velho	Portuguese	15th	Azores
François de La Vérendrye	French Canadian	18th	Western Canada
Louis-Joseph Gaultier de La Vérendrye	French Canadian	18th	Great Plains
Pierre Gaultier de Varennes, sieur de La Vérendrye	French	18th	Great Plains
Giovanni da Verrazzano	Italian	16th	East Coast of the United States
Amerigo Vespucci	Italian	15th/16th	Eastern South American coast, Caribbean
Flóki Vilgerðarson	Norse Viking	9th	Iceland
Ruy López de Villalobos	Spanish	16th	Pacific Ocean, Philippines
Vandino and Ugolino Vivaldi	Italian	13th	Africa, in a failed attempt to reach India
Sebastián Vizcaíno	Spanish	16th	Northwest Pacific, California Coast
Willem de Vlamingh	Dutch	17th	Southwest Australian coast
Maarten Gerritsz Vries	Dutch	17th	Northwest Pacific (Hokkaido, Sakhalin)
Lionel Wafer	Welsh	17th	Malay Archipelago, Isthmus of Panama
Jean-Frédéric Waldeck	French	19th	Mesoamerica (Mayan remains)
Thomas Walker	American	18th	Eastern United States
Samuel Wallis	British	18th	First recorded visit to Tahiti
Gino Watkins	English	20th	East Greenland & Labrador
Langdon Warner	American	20th	the Silk Road
Alfred Wegener	German	20th	Greenland
John White	English	16th	Roanoke Island
Jim Whittaker	American	20th	Mount Everest, Antarctica
Frederick Whymper	English	19th	Alaska, Kamchatka, Yukon
Charles Wilkes	American	19th	Pacific Ocean
Edward Adrian Wilson	English	19th/20th	Antarctica
Ernest Henry Wilson	English	19th/20th	East Asia, East Africa, Central and South America, Australia, New Zealand
James Wilson	British	18th	Pacific Islands
Thomas Braidwood Wilson	Scottish Australian	19th	Australia
Harry de Windt	French	19th/20th	Eurasia
Fanny Bullock Workman	American	19th/20th	Himalaya
Ferdinand von Wrangel	Baltic German	19th	Northern Russia
Xuanzang	Chinese	7th	Indian subcontinent, Central Asia
John Young	Scottish-English	18th	Hawaii
Sir Francis Younghusband	British	19th/20th	Central Asia
Topa Inca Yupanqui	Inca	15th	Pacific
João Gonçalves Zarco	Portuguese	15th	Madeira Islands
Gonzalo García Zorro	Spanish	16th	Colombia
Karl Helbig	German	20th	Java, Sumatra, Borneo, Central America
John Lawson	English	18th	North Carolina, South Carolina

== See also ==
- Age of Discovery
- Astronaut/Cosmonaut/Taikonaut
  - International Space Station
  - List of people who have walked on the Moon
- Bandeirantes
- Chronology of European exploration of Asia
- Conquistador
- Exploration
- List of explorations
- List of lost expeditions
- List of female explorers and travelers
- List of maritime explorers
- List of Russian explorers
- List of travelers
- Maritime timeline
- Portuguese discoveries
- Radhanites
- Silk Road
- Spice trade
- The Exploration Museum
- Timeline of maritime migration and exploration
- Trans-Saharan trade
- Travel literature
