= Sebastián de Ocampo =

Spanish navigator and explorer

Sebastián de Ocampo was a Spanish navigator and explorer. He is believed to have been the first navigator to have circumnavigated the island of Cuba in 1508.

Under the authority of the Governor of Hispaniola, Ocampo sailed along the northern coast of the island through the Old Bahama Channel and around the western point, Cape San Antonio. The voyage took eight months, and was against the Gulf Stream. Europeans had already frequented Cuba by the time Ocampo embarked on his journey, but his circumnavigation confirmed that the area was indeed surrounded by water, and not a peninsula as was speculated. Ocampo returned to Hispaniola with news of the body of water that lay beyond. Before that, and after the Spanish discovery of the Antilles, several maps portrayed what latter-day interpreters have assumed to be the Gulf of Mexico, thereby disputing the actual discovery date. He died at an old age in a year no one is sure of.

== See also ==
- List of explorers
- Explorations (disambiguation)
- History of Cuba
