= Mario Rigby =

Canadian-Turks and Caicos Islander adventure explorer and author

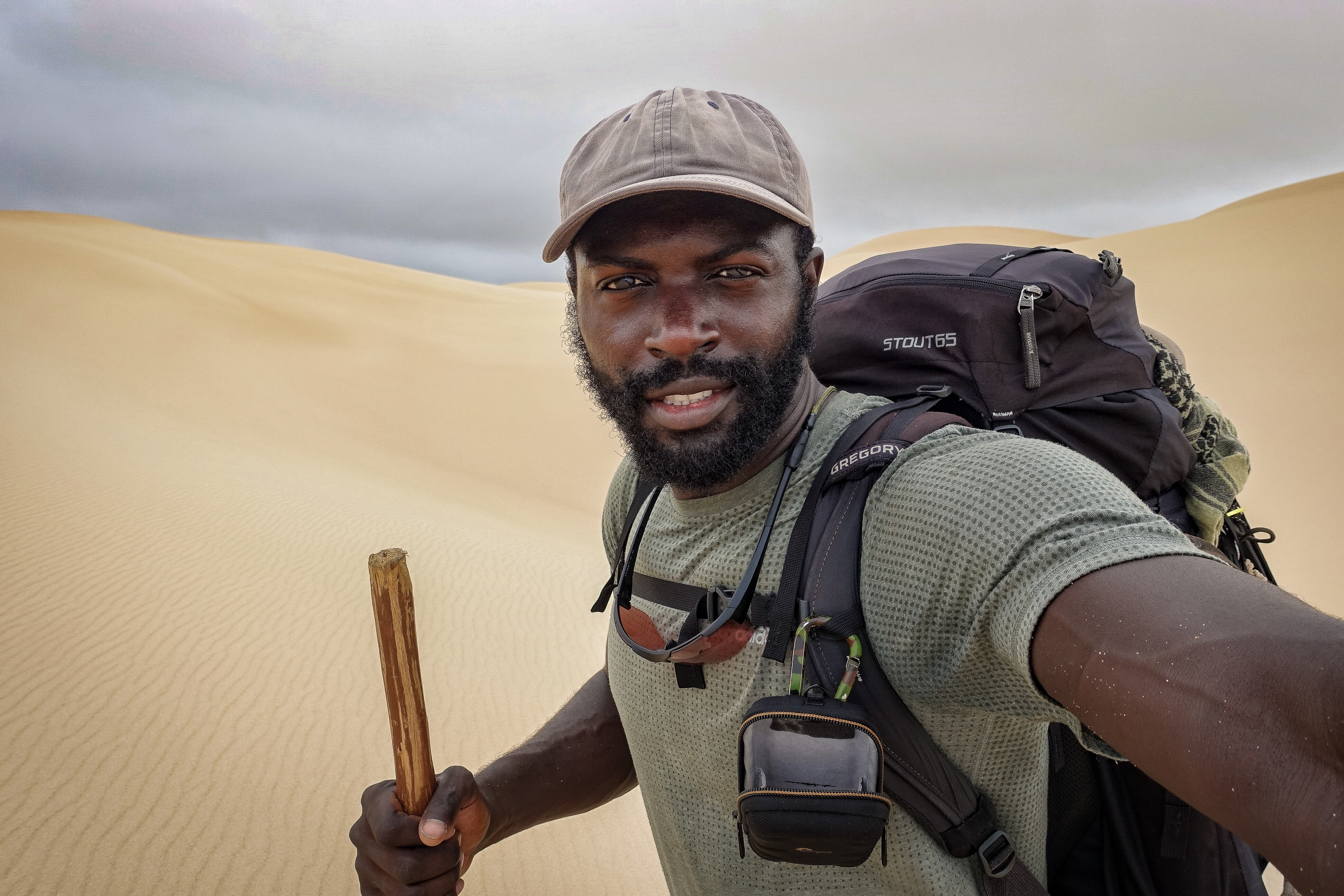
Mario Rigby

Mario Rigby is a Canadian-Turks and Caicos Islander adventure explorer, author, speaker, and former professional track and field athlete currently based in Toronto, ON. From 2015 to 2017, he completed an epic two year long walk across Africa, from Cape Town to Cairo entitled Crossing Africa. Mario is an advocate for the inclusion of diversity in the outdoors and encourages POC (people of colour) to explore the outdoors more often. Rigby leads hikes, small expeditions and speaking engagements between major projects.

Rigby was born on 24 November 1985 in Grand Turk Island, Turks and Caicos Islands to Zemar Stingl. He is the oldest of two sons born to Stingl, and he is of Jamaican and Bahamian descent. Shortly after his brother was born, the family relocated to Stuttgart, Germany where they resided for several years before returning to the Caribbean. The family's first move to Canada was to Hamilton, Ontario. Rigby ran competitive track and field for Turks and Caicos from age 14-26 and competed in multiple world championships and IAAF tournaments.

After completing high school in Hamilton, he moved to London, ON when he was 18, and attended Western University. He later moved to Toronto where he became a fitness trainer and ran his own gym in downtown Toronto.

== Adventures ==
=== Walk across Africa ===
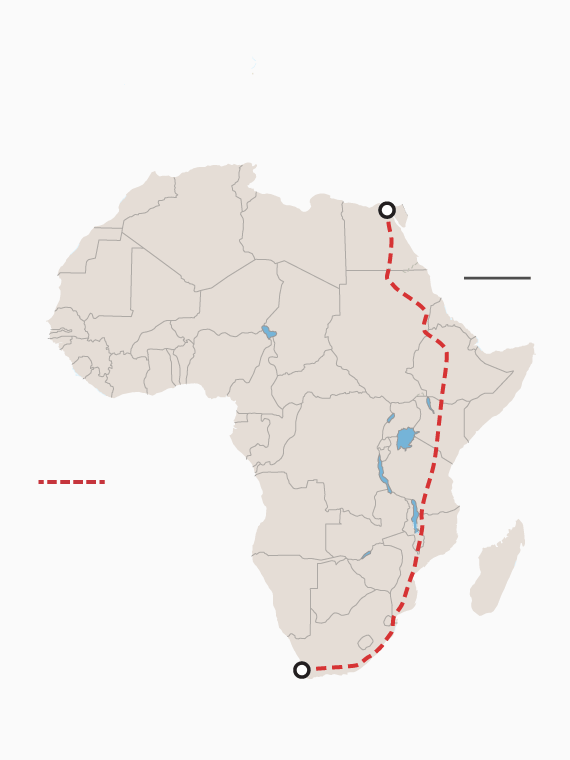
Map of walk across Africa

In early 2015, Rigby decided he wanted to "shatter stereotypes that set narrow limits on what he can aspire to and where he can go". He began to research and train for an epic two-year long walk across the continent of Africa. "Rigby started training slowly. First, he walked from his home near Queen and Ossington to the Eaton Centre, then up to Bloor Street. Once that five-kilometre trip felt easy, he kept increasing the distance, walking from Toronto to Hamilton and, eventually, from Toronto to Montreal".

By November 2015, he flew to Cape Town, South Africa, and embarked on a journey that took him through South Africa, Mozambique, Malawi, Tanzania, Kenya, Ethiopia, Sudan, and Egypt. He walked most of the way, only switching his routine to kayak through Lake Malawi, the ninth largest in the world, and second deepest in Africa. He completed the adventure by early 2018 and returned to Toronto in March 2018.

Rigby's Crossing Africa Expedition garnered him international acclaim and coverage from digital and print media around the world. A feature article in the Toronto Star was one of the top stories on their website for 2 weeks. He was also interviewed on multiple national Canadian network shows such as The Marilyn Dennis Show, The Social, and CTV National News.

=== Cycle across Canada ===
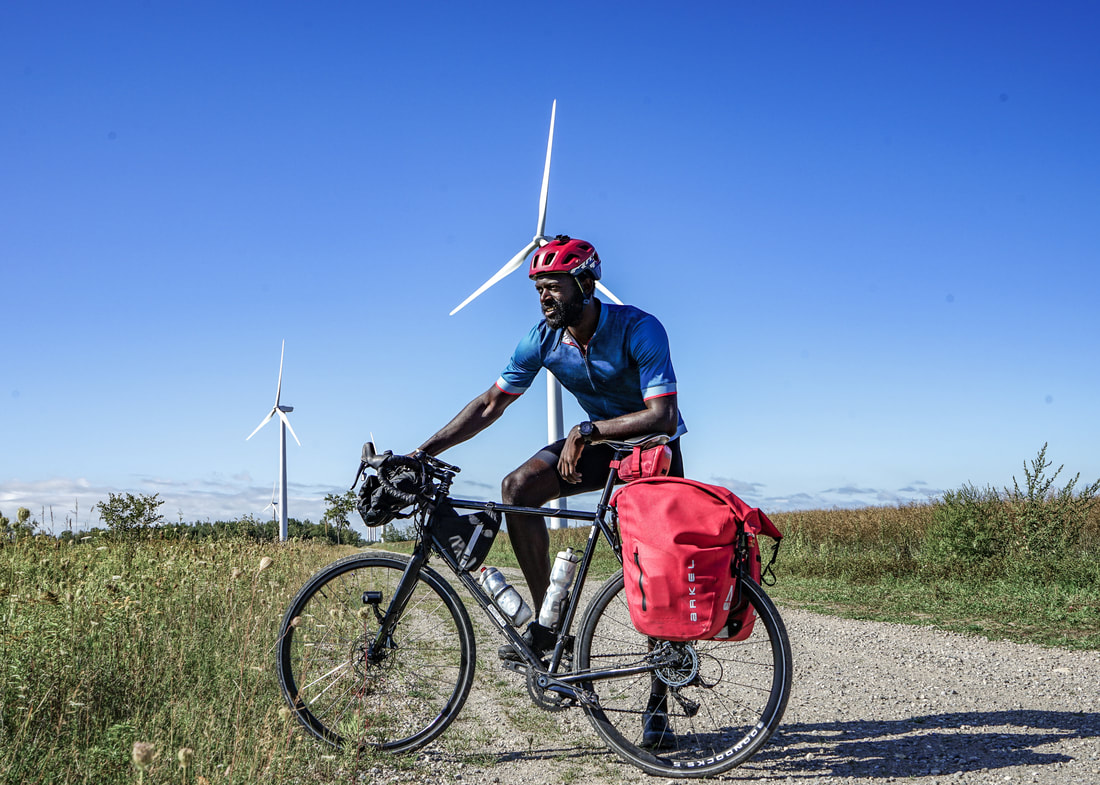

Mario completed a solo and unsupported cycling tour across Canada and the United States from Victoria, British Columbia to St. John's, Newfoundland. The tour began 19 July and ended 18 October. A walk in the park compared to Crossing Africa but this was an entirely different challenge on its own for Rigby. Training throughout the year and joining charity bike tours to gain experience is how Mario prepared for his tour. Mario kept his route live and trackable on Strava for people to follow along his journey.

MEC (Mountain Equipment Co-op) saw the importance in representation of diversity within the outdoor industry and partnered with Mario to help make this tour feasible for him.

PURPOSE

- Help identify representation of diversity in the outdoor industry.
- Inspiring people to enjoy adventure and exploration for the great outdoors.
- Promote human powered adventures for the sake of reducing CO_{2} emissions and living sustainably.

=== Toronto to Montreal walk ===
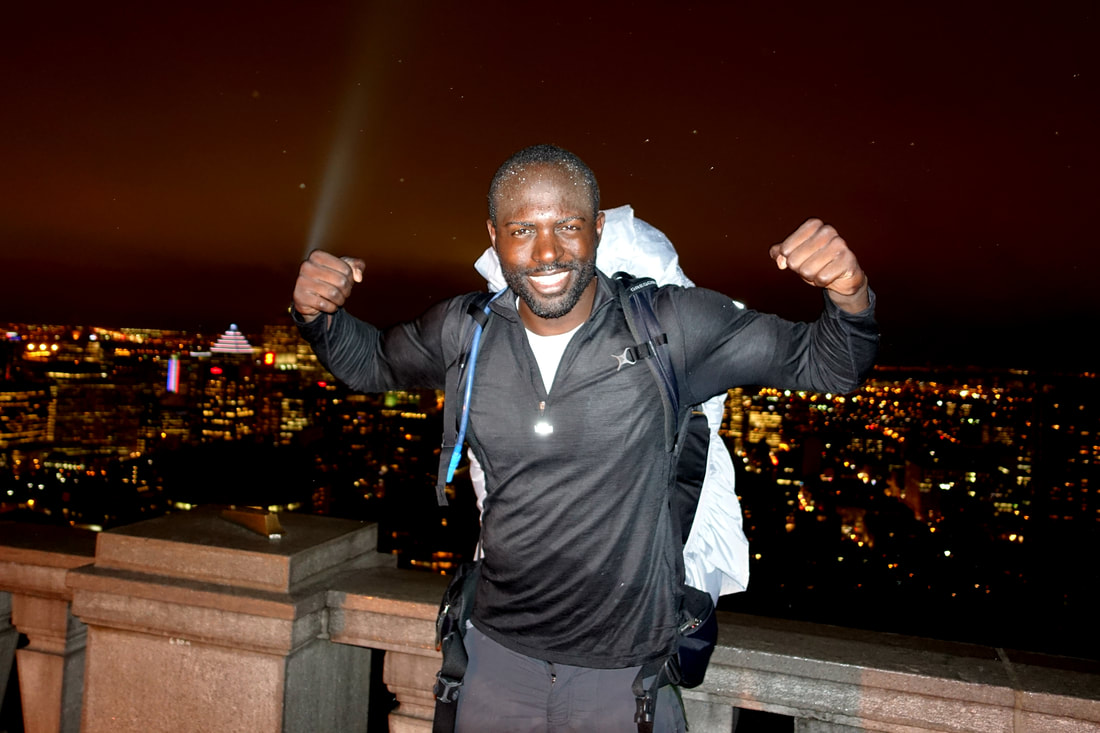

Mario Rigby en route on foot for the 60 km from Toronto to Hamilton in July 2015 Foster-Laroque suggested the journey to Rigby in preparation for his upcoming quest to cross the continent of Africa from Cape Town to Cairo, by foot, sail and paddle only.

Walking from the CN Tower in Toronto to the summit of Mount Royal in Montreal

Donna Foster-Larocque in action © Donna Foster-Laroque/blogIn an interview with CBC's Andie Bennett, Foster-Larocque explained the journey. "We’re trying to mimic exactly what his walk is going to be so that means a back-pack, carrying all of our fuel, the sleeping bag, the tents, our little stove burners, the lamps, the thermal clothing, everything that we can think of that will be on the walk we’ll do together so that he’ll have more experience when he does the trek across Africa." Mario Rigby, a Toronto-based personal trainer and former professional track and field athlete, is setting out on the two-year journey on 24 November 2015.

He says he is doing it to test his limits and connect with his heritage. The sometime model was born in Turks and Caicos, and has plans to document the Africa crossing in several media. As for the current quest, Rigby arrived in Kingston, Ontario, last night, sharing his fatigue on Twitter. Just beyond the half-way point now, Rigby is expected to arrive atop Mount Royal in Montreal on 13 or 14 November. The 500 kilometre trip from Toronto to Montreal is one many Canadians are familiar with, but only from the point of view of a vehicle. It may be ideal for Mario Rigby as he gets physically and psychologically ready to embark on the 10,000 kilometre trek across Africa.

By Carmel Kilkenny Wednesday 4 November 2015

== Documentaries ==
=== Turks & Caicos adventures ===
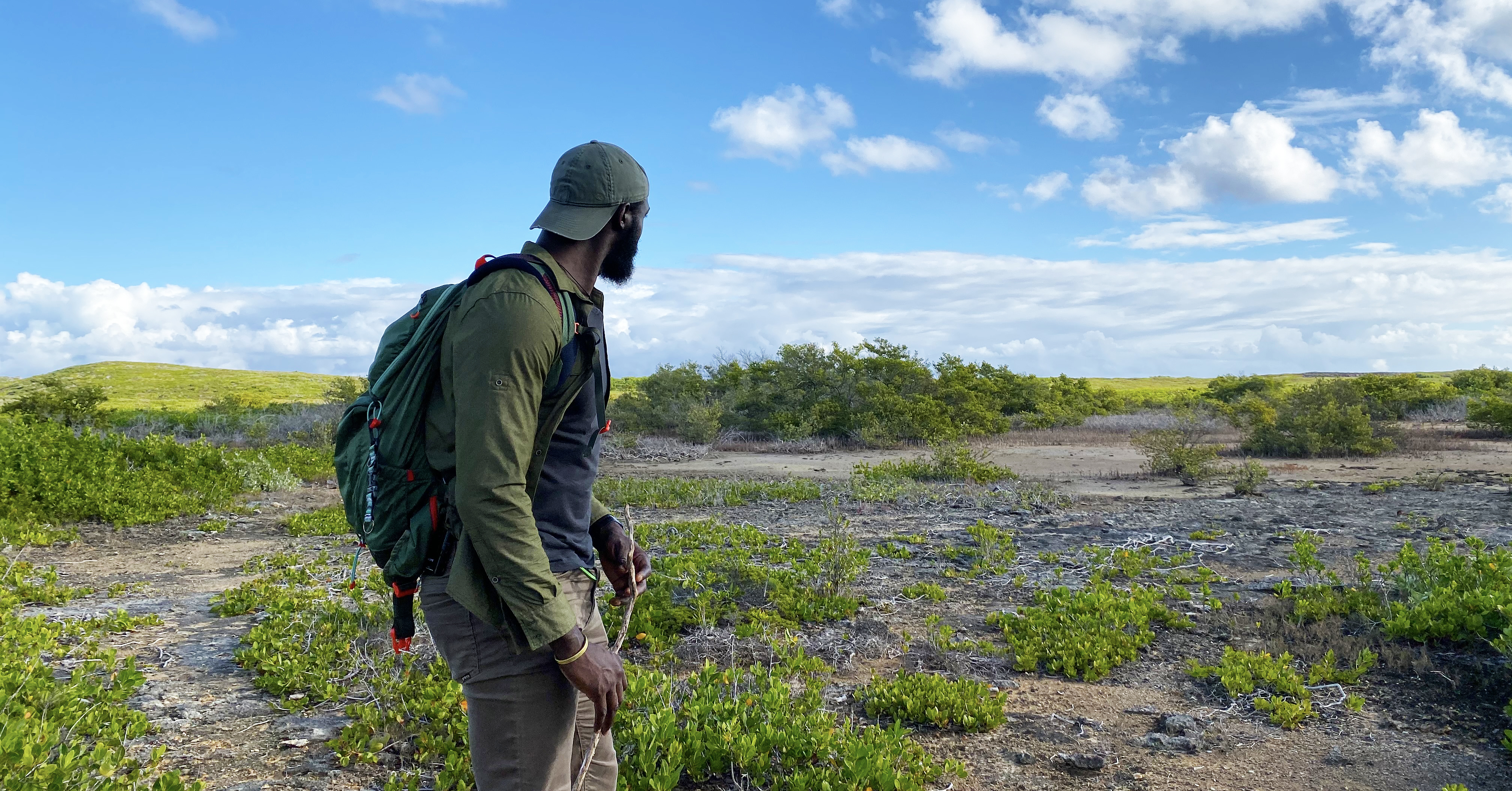

Mario is home to chronicle new adventures in the Turks and Caicos

Between globe-trotting explorations to remote parts of the world in 2020, Mario shares breathtaking and heart-pumping local adventures with our readers and followers at @turkscaicosmag Diving into history, culture and natural wonders, the series offers a dynamic perspective on the diverse beauty of the islands’ through his eyes of adventure and exploration.

Revisiting some of Mario's favourite spots and exploring new horizons of his homeland, Mario will venture to the islands’ most rugged landscapes, revealing historical significance of sites, as well as expounding on the islands’ rich culture in this visual storytelling series.

== Recognition ==
MIPAD Award Rigby has been chosen as one of 200 nominees for the 2018 Most Influential People of African Descent (MIPAD) global 100 list to recognize the positive contributions made by people of African descent, worldwide, across 4 categories. MIPAD is a unique global list that identifies, in total, 200 outstanding individuals under 40, with 100 inside Africa, 100 outside Africa in the Diaspora across 4 categories; Politics & Governance, Business & Entrepreneurship, Media & Culture, Humanitarian & Religious.

The Explorer's Club The Explorer's Club honoured Mario Rigby as a club member at the exclusive club in 2020.

Toronto Star Feature The Toronto Star (Feature Article) titled "He wanted young black people to be brave so he walked and kayaked across Africa for two years" was a full feature article that chronicled the many adventures experiences Mario faced during his walk across Africa for two and a half years.

== Talks ==
Mario has delivered dozens of talks for schools and organizations all over the world to encourage them to overcome and conquer fears. Being an advocate for the environment, Rigby also educates about the importance of saving our planet, and our role as individuals to bridge the gaps between humanity.

== See also ==
Rigby is currently living in Toronto working on his memoir on Crossing Africa, and preparing for his next expeditions.
