= Robert Hottot =

Robert Hottot (1884, Paris - 1939) was a French explorer.

In 1908–1909, Hottot organised in association with the Muséum national d'histoire naturelle in Paris an expedition along the Congo River to Lake Chad. One of the expedition members was Léon Poutrin. After the expedition and his marriage he lived in various places in France, then in Jersey and finally in Oxford.

He was sometime President of the Oxford University Anthropological Society and a Fellow of the Royal Anthropological Institute of Great Britain and Ireland. His zoological Botanical and ethnographic collections are mostly in Paris (Muséum national d'histoire naturelle and Musée du quai Branly) as was his agreement with the French Government but a small collection of insects from Equatorial Africa is in the Oxford University Museum of Natural History and some expedition papers and early stereo photographs are in the Pitt Rivers Museum.

== Works ==
Partial list

- Hottot, R. 1956 (prepared for publication by Frank Willett). Teke fetishes. Royal Anthropological Institute of Great Britain and Ireland Journal. 86:25–36.
