= List of women explorers and travelers =

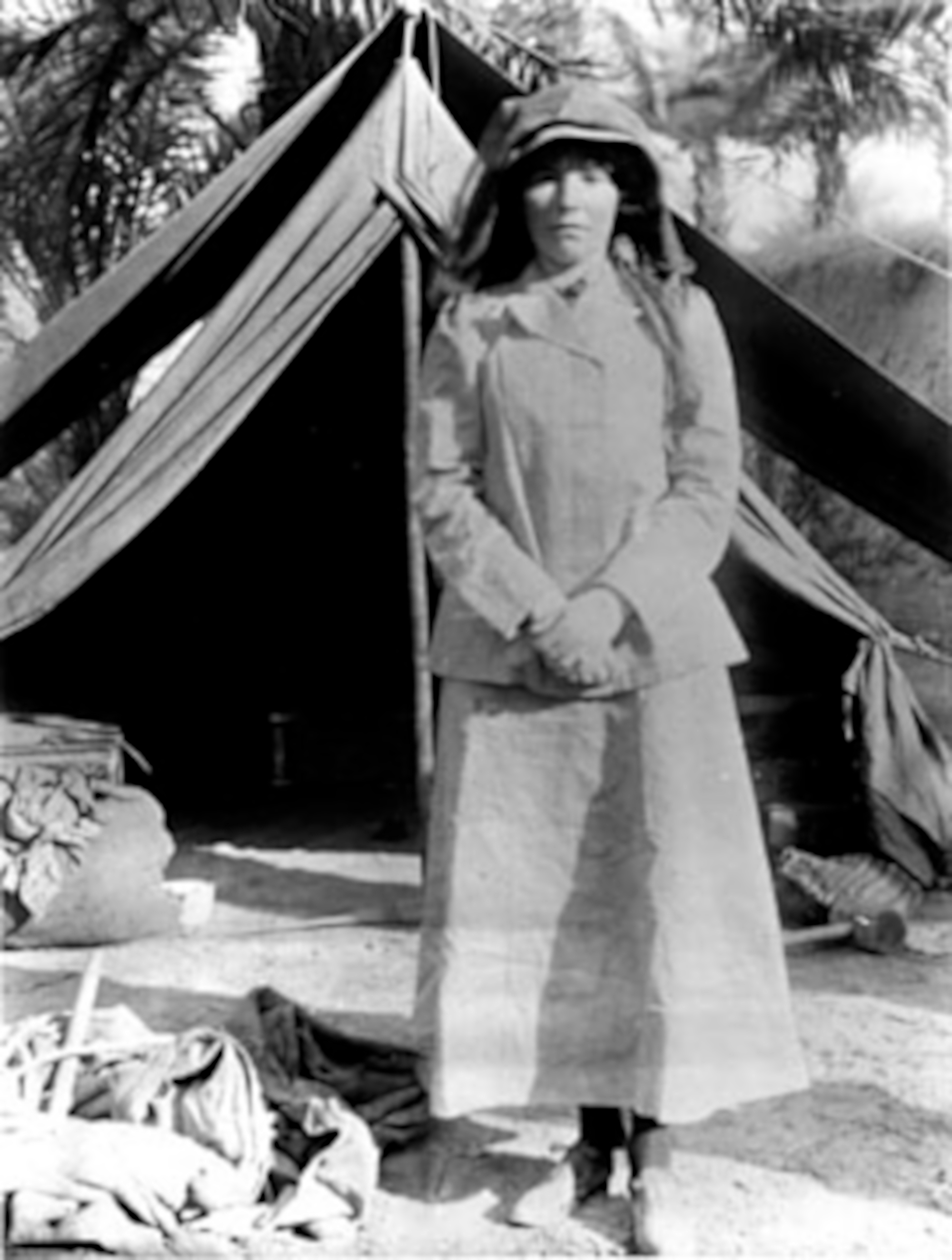
English writer Gertrude Bell in Iraq, 1909

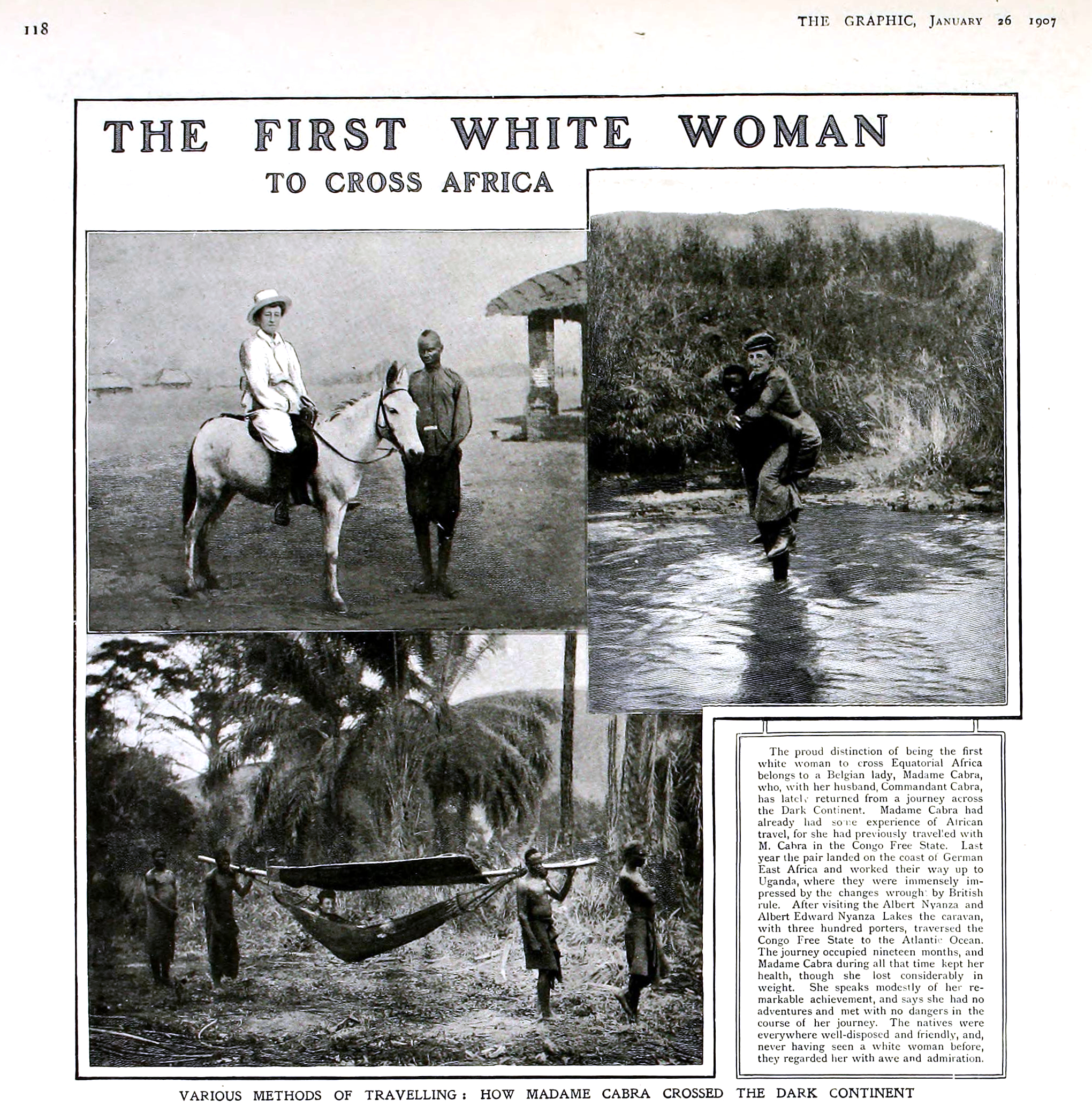
Belgian Berthe Cabra

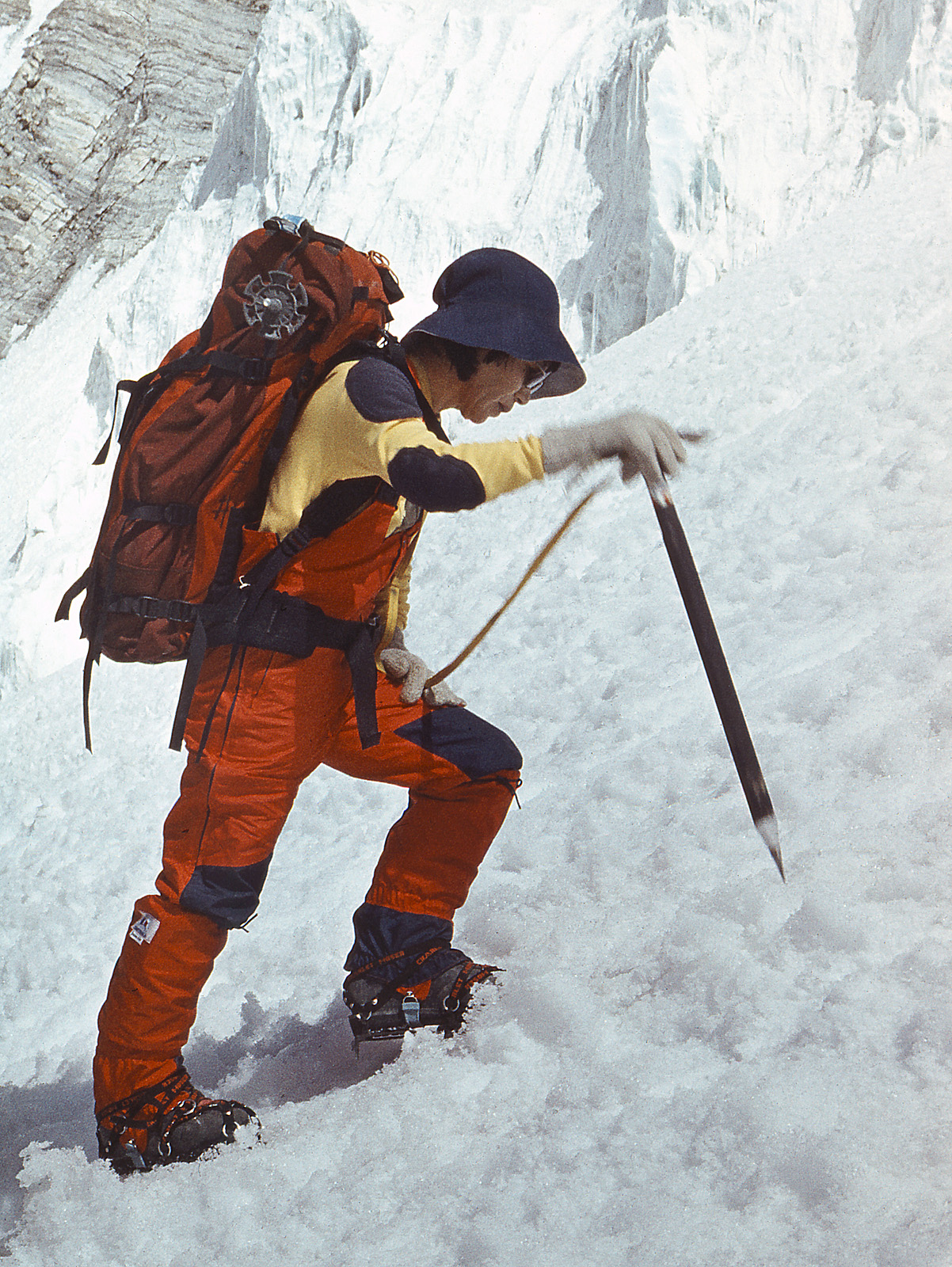
Japanese climber Junko Tabei

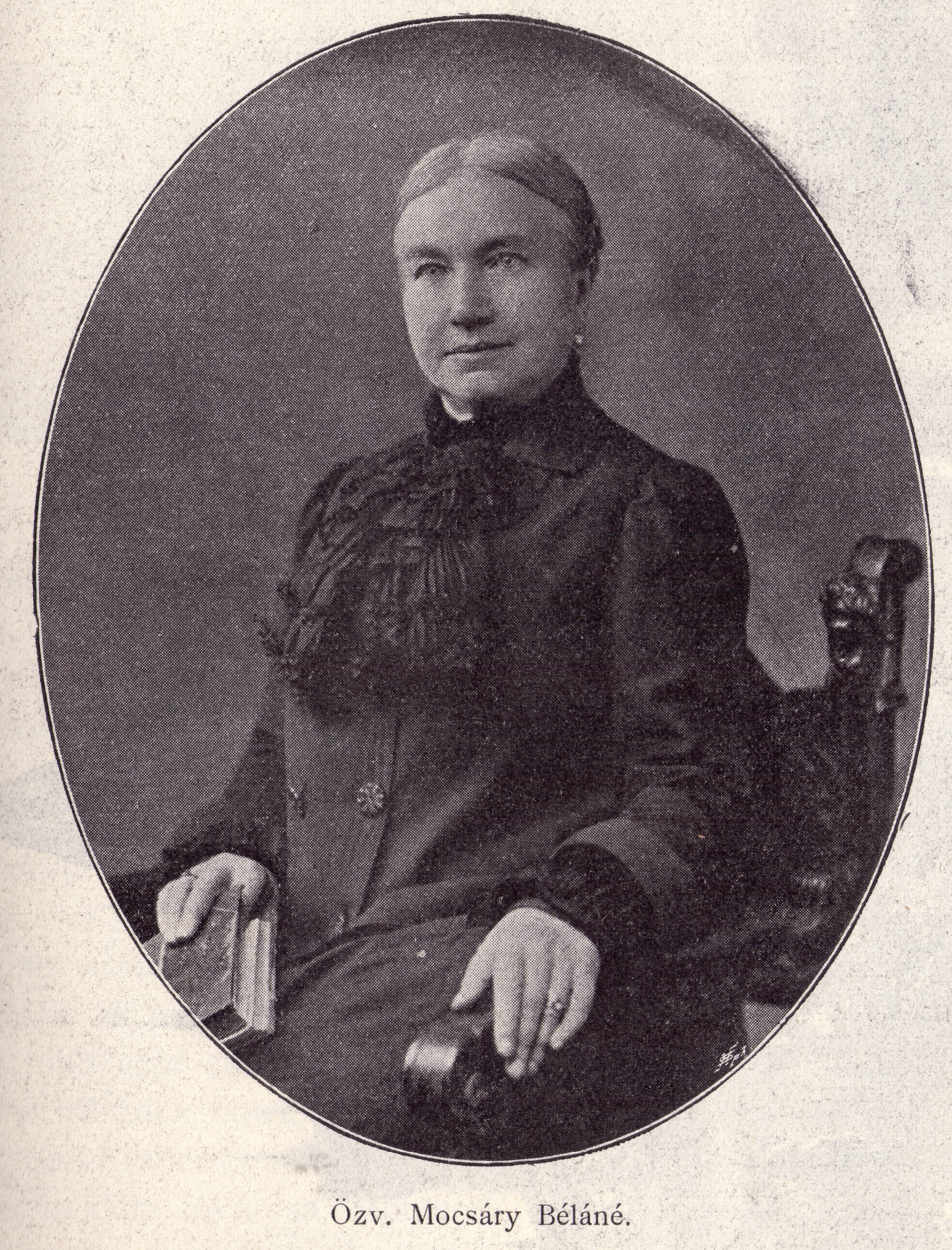
Hungarian geographer Béláné Mocsáry

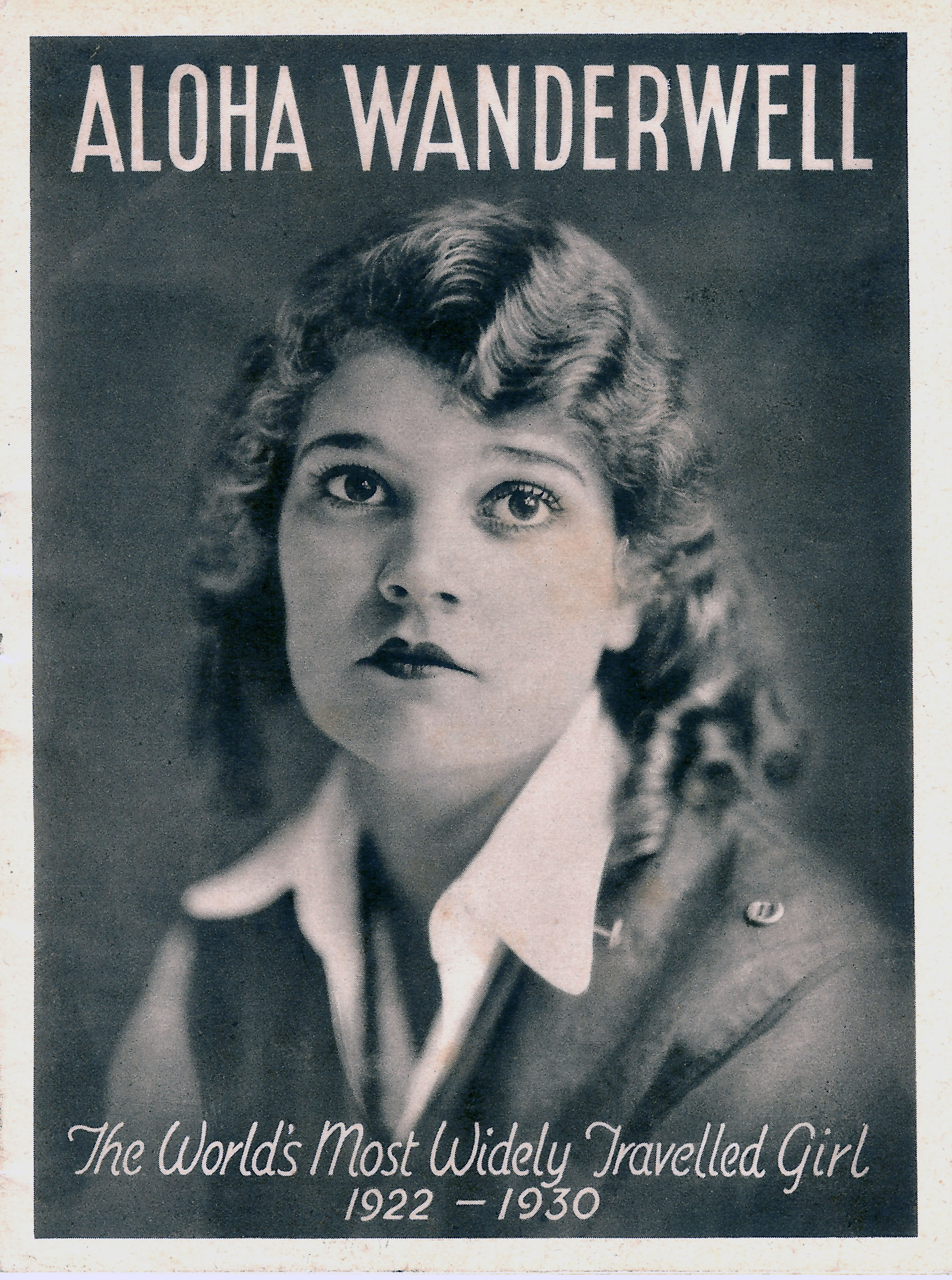
Canadian-born Aloha Wanderwell

The women listed below are or were explorers or world travelers. They include naturalists, sailors, mountain climbers, dog sledders, swimmers, pilots, and underwater explorers. Astronauts are not included here but in the list of women astronauts.

Name	Nationality	Born	Died	Achievement/s
Harriet Chalmers Adams	American	1875	1937	Explored and photographed South America, Asia, South Pacific
Tania Aebi	American	1966		Held the record as the youngest person and first American woman to sail solo around the world (with stops and assistance)
Alexis Alford	American	1998		Youngest person to travel to every country in the world
Felicity Aston	British	1977		First person to ski alone across the Antarctic land-mass using only personal muscle power, as well as the first woman to cross the Antarctic land-mass alone
Dominick Arduin	French	1960	2004	Disappeared on her attempt to become the first woman to ski alone to the North Pole
Florence Augusta Merriam Bailey	American	1863	1948	American ornithologist and nature writer, who conducted extensive field work in the American West
Ann Bancroft	American	1955		First woman to travel over the ice cap to the North and South Poles
Jeanne Baré	French	1740	1807	First woman (disguised as a man) to circumnavigate the world
Jean Batten	New Zealander	1909	1982	First person to fly between England and New Zealand solo - broke other records
Carol Beckwith	American	1945		Photographer, author, and filmmaker known for documenting the tribal cultures of Africa, most notably in partnership with Australian photographer Angela Fisher
Gertrude Bell	British	1868	1926	Explored and mapped the region of Syria, Mesopotamia, Asia Minor, Arabia
Gertrude Benham	British	1867	1938	Explorer, hiker and mountaineer; Truda Peaks of Mount Rogers is named after her
Mabel Bent	Anglo-Irish	1847	1929	Explored and excavated with her husband James Theodore Bent in the Eastern Mediterranean, South Africa and Southern Arabia
Laura Bingham	British	1992		Executed expedition to cross continent of South America with no money
Isabella Bird	British	1831	1904	Explorer, writer and naturalist who travelled by herself through North America, Hawaii, Japan, Korea, China, Vietnam, Singapore, Malaysia, India, Persia, Kurdistan, Turkey, and Morocco
Nancy Bird-Walton	Australian	1915	2009	Australian aviation pioneer
Nellie Bly	American	1864	1922	Pioneering journalist who travelled around the world in 72 days, the first person to do so
Alessandra Boarelli	Italian	1838	1908	Italian mountaineer and the first woman to summit Monviso in the Alps in 1864
Laurence Bougault	French	1970	2018	French poet and long-distance horseback adventurer in Africa, Middle East and Europe
Louise Bourbonnaud	French	1847	1915	French philanthropist, explorer and writer who traveled alone through North and South America and the Far East
Louise Arner Boyd	American	1887	1972	Explored Greenland and the Arctic
Beatrix Bulstrode	British	1869	1951	Journalist and writer who traveled through China and Mongolia in 1911–1913
Susan Butcher	American	1954	2006	Dog musher in Alaska
Berthe Cabra	Belgian	1864	1947	Belgian traveller, first European woman to travel across central Africa from East to West
Calamity Jane	American	1852	1903	American frontierswoman and professional scout, known for her claim of being an acquaintance of Wild Bill Hickok and for fighting Indigenous peoples of the Americas
Charlotte Cameron	American	1872 or 1873	1946	American traveller and author
Renata Chlumska	Czech and Swedish	1973		Climbed Mount Everest, kayaked and bicycled around lower 48 states of USA
Krystyna Chojnowska-Liskiewicz	Polish	1936	2021	First woman to sail solo around the world
Kay Cottee	Australian	1954		First woman to sail solo, non-stop around the world
Octavie Coudreau	French	c. 1870	c. 1910	Early explorer and geographer of the Amazon region in Brazil and French Guiana
Aimée Crocker	American	1864	1941	Heiress, writer spent a decade exploring the Far East in the 1890s; toured the interior of Java and Borneo
Sophia Danenberg	American	1972		First black woman to reach summit of Mount Everest
Anne-France Dautheville	French	c.1943		First woman to motorcycle solo around the world
Alexandra David-Néel	French	1868	1969	Travelled to Tibet while closed to foreigners
Robyn Davidson	Australian	1950		2,700 km (1,700 mi) camel trek from Alice Springs to the west coast of Australia
Cassandra De Pecol	American	1989		Traveled to all sovereign nations on a trip from July 24, 2015, to February 2, 2017; she thus obtained the Guinness World Record for "Fastest Person (Female) to Travel to All Sovereign Nations" and is the first documented woman, fastest American, and youngest American to do such a trip
Laura Dekker	Dutch, German, and New Zealander	1995		Youngest person to sail around world solo
Eva Dickson	Swedish	1905	1938	Swedish explorer, aviator, travel writer and rally driver; first woman to cross the Sahara by car
Lady Hay Drummond-Hay	British	1894	1946	First woman to circumnavigate the world by air (by zeppelin)
Edith Durham	British	1863	1944	Explored Albania and the Balkans
Amelia Earhart	American	1897	1937	First woman to fly solo across Atlantic
Lucy Shepherd	British	1992		Filmmaker, author and explorer of jungles, polar regions and mountains. Shepherd spent 50 days traversing unexplored Amazon rainforest on foot alongside an Indigenous team
Isabelle Eberhardt	Swiss	1877	1904	Swiss explorer and writer in Algeria, who converted to Islam and traveled freely dressed as a man
Gertrude Ederle	American	1905	2003	First woman to swim English Channel
Ginny Fiennes	British	1947	2004	First woman to be awarded the Polar Medal, and architect of the Transglobe Expedition
Enid Gordon-Gallien	British	c. 1887	1931	Explored and mapped Kalambo Falls
Barbara Hillary	American	1931	2019	First African American woman to reach North Pole
Dorothy Hosmer	American	1911	2008	Photographer and travel writer, first woman freelance contributor to the National Geographic magazine
Amy Johnson	British	1903	1941	Pioneering aviator who set long-distance flying records
Osa Johnson	American	1894	1953	Made films of and wrote books about travels in Africa, South Pacific, Borneo
Gerlinde Kaltenbrunner	Austrian	1970		First woman to climb all fourteen eight-thousander mountains without supplementary oxygen
Alma Maximiliana Karlin	Slovene	1889	1950	World traveler, writer, poet, polyglot and theosophist; second European woman to circle the world solo; in an eight-year travel, she explored North and South America, Oceania, Australia, East Asia, and India
Mary Kingsley	British	1862	1900	Ethnographer and explorer of West Africa
Belinda Kirk	British	c. 1974		Founder of Explorers Connect; has travelled across Africa, Nicaragua, and the Chinese Taklamakan Desert; captained the first all-female rowing team to circumnavigate Britain non-stop
Lyuba Kutincheva	Bulgarian	1910	1998	Bulgarian traveler and polyglot who traveled for almost a decade (1929–1938) through the Middle East, Far East, northern Africa and Europe
Miriam Lancewood	Dutch	1983		Explored the wild nature for decades in Europe, New Zealand, Australia, India, ect. Author of several books that describe her way of life living from what nature has to offer. 14: Adventurer Miriam Lancewood, interview 5 November, 2017 in The Guardian, UK https://www.theguardian.com/global/2017/nov/05/wild-at-heart-how-one-woman-and-her-husband-live-out-in-the-woods
Gertrude Sanford Legendre	American	1902	2000	American socialite who was a noted explorer and big-game hunter; contributed rare specimens from Africa, Iran, Southeast Asia, Canada, and Alaska to natural history museums
Annie Londonderry	Latvian American	1870	1947	First woman to bicycle around the world
Ella Maillart	Swiss	1903	1997	Explorer and travel writer in Asia from the late 1920s through to World War II; wrote Forbidden Journey – From Peking to Kashmir
Charlotte Mansfield	British	1881	1936	Wrote Via Rhodesia (1911) about her travels in Southern Africa
Beryl Markham	British	1902	1986	British-born Kenyan aviator (one of the first bush pilots), adventurer, racehorse trainer and author; first woman to fly solo across the Atlantic from east to west
Sarah Marquis	Swiss	1972		Swiss adventurer and explorer who walked 16,000 km (10,000 mi) across Asia, Siberia and Australia
Nicole Maxwell	American	1906	1998	Traveled the Amazon jungle gathering plants for natural remedies and medical use, reportedly amassing over 600 plants; wrote Witch Doctor's Apprentice: Hunting for Medicinal Plants in the Amazon
Elizabeth Sarah Mazuchelli	British	1832	1914	Reportedly first western woman to see Mount Everest; wrote The Indian Alps and How We Crossed Them
Annette Meakin	British	1867	1959	First Englishwoman to cross the Trans-Siberian Railway; wrote about this in The Ribbon of Iron; travelled in Russian Turkestan and other parts of Russia
Ynes Mexia	Mexican-American	1870	1938	Mexican botanist and explorer who started her career at age 55; discovered one new genus (Mexianthus) and many new species of plants
Jerrie Mock	American	1925	2014	First woman pilot to circumnavigate the world, flew solo in 1964 in her plane Spirit of Columbus from and to the Port Columbus International Airport in Ohio
Béláné Mocsáry	Hungarian	1845	1917	Hungarian geographer and travel writer who journeyed solo to four continents in the early 1900s
Dervla Murphy	Irish	1931	2022	Irish travel writer known for cycling alone through Europe, Iran, Afghanistan, Pakistan to India
Marianne North	British	1830	1890	Prolific English Victorian biologist and botanical artist
Vanessa O'Brien	American and British	1964		First woman to reach Earth's highest (Mt. Everest 8,848m) and lowest points (Challenger Deep 10,925m)
Ida Pfeiffer	Austrian	1797	1858	Travelled alone around the world in 1847, published books of her numerous travels
Dorothy Pine	American	1920	2011	Possibly first woman to visit all 193 UN-recognised countries
Anésia Pinheiro Machado	Brazilian	1904	1999	Second Brazilian licensed female pilot in Brazil
Odette du Puigaudeau	French	1894	1991	made three trips to northern Africa to conduct field research among the nomads of the western Sahara region and eventually moved to Morocco
Teresa Remiszewska	Polish	1928	2002	first Polish woman to make a solo sailing voyage around the Baltic Sea, using the yacht Zenit, taking a 690-mile route
Kate Rice	Canadian	1882	1963	First woman prospector in Northern Canada, writer, and trapper well known for her dog sled abilities
Ruth Robertson	American	1905	1998	American photojournalist, pilot and explorer who led the successful expedition which measured Angel Falls, as the highest waterfall in the world.
Wanda Rutkiewicz	Polish	1943	1992	Polish mountain climber, first woman to successfully summit K2
Vefa de Saint-Pierre	French	1872	1967	Global voyager and hunter traveling across North and South America and Australia, writing about her adventures
Kira Salak	American	1971		Travelled in Mali and Papua New Guinea
Annemarie Schwarzenbach	Swiss	1908	1942	Journalist and photographer, travelled to Iran, Afghanistan, Africa
Eliza Scidmore	American	1856	1928	Journalist and travel writer on Alaska and Far East; introduced idea of Japanese cherry trees to Washington, D.C.
Beryl Smeeton	British	1905	1979	Mountaineer, cruising sailor, overland traveller
Annie Smith Peck	American	1850	1935	First person to climb Mount Nevado Huascarán in the Andes
Stephanie Solomonides	Cypriot	1982		First Cypriot person to reach North and South Poles
Woni Spotts	American	1964		First Black woman to hold a world record for travel to every country and continent by September 2018
Hester Stanhope	British	1776	1839	Conducted first modern archaeology in Holy Land; travelled dressed as a man (unveiled)
Freya Stark	British and Italian (French born)	1893	1993	Travelled within and wrote about the Middle East, including the Arabian deserts, Afghanistan
Matilda Coxe Stevenson	American	1849	1915	Ethnologist and geologist who explored the Rocky Mountain region and the Southwest U.S.
Clärenore Stinnes	German	1901	1990	First woman to circumnavigate the world by automobile
Rosie Swale-Pope	Swiss, Irish, and British	1946		Has run, walked and sailed around the world
Junko Tabei	Japanese	1939	2016	First woman to reach summit of Mount Everest
Annie Edson Taylor	American	1838	1921	First person to survive a trip over the Niagara Falls in a barrel
Gudrid Thorbjarnardóttir	Icelandic	980	1019	With her husband, led an expedition to North America
Alexine Tinne	Dutch	1835	1869	Dutch explorer in Africa and the first European woman to attempt to cross the Sahara
Adeline Van Buren	American	1889	1949	Along with her sister Augusta Van Buren, the first women to ride solo motorcycles across the continental US
Augusta Van Buren	American	1884	1959	Along with her sister Adeline Van Buren, the first women to ride solo motorcycles across the continental US
Gabrielle Maud Vassal	British	1880	1959	Naturalist in Vietnam, Congo, Gabon
Aloha Wanderwell	Canadian	1906	1996	First woman to drive around the world
Jessica Watson	Australian and New Zealander	1993		Youngest person to sail non-stop and unassisted around the world (but did not fulfil WSSRC criteria)
Fanny Bullock Workman	American	1859	1925	American cartographer, explored glaciers in Himalayas

== See also ==
- Age of Discovery
- Exploration
- List of Antarctic women
- List of explorations
- List of explorers
- List of lost expeditions
- List of travelers
- List of women astronauts
- Women in space
