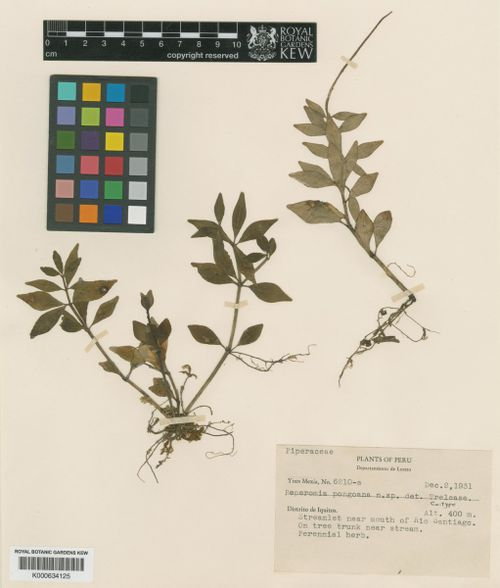

Scientific classification
- Kingdom: Plantae
- Clade: Tracheophytes
- Clade: Angiosperms
- Clade: Magnoliids
- Order: Piperales
- Family: Piperaceae
- Genus: Peperomia
- Species: P. pongoana

Binomial name
- Peperomia pongoana Trel.

= Peperomia pongoana =

Species of plant

Peperomia pongoana is a species of terrestrial or epiphytic herb in the genus Peperomia that is native to Peru. It grows on wet tropical biomes. Its conservation status is threatened.

== Description ==
The type specimen were collected at Pongo de Manseriche, Peru at an altitude of 400 meters above sea level.

Peperomia pongoana is a moderately small, erect, branching herb that is glabrous except for a transient puberulence on the petioles and stems. The stem is 1–2 mm thick and grooved when dry. The leaves are in whorls of 3–4 at the nodes. They are lanceolate, obtuse, with an acute base, measuring 15–25 mm long and 5–10 mm wide, 3-nerved, and pale and somewhat papillose on the underside. The petiole is 2–5 mm long. The terminal and upper axillary spikes are filiform, 60 mm long, with a 5 mm peduncle. The floral bracts are elliptic-peltate (rather than round-peltate).

== Taxonomy and naming ==
It was described in 1936 by William Trelease in Publications of the Field Museum of Natural History, Botanical Series 13, from specimens collected by Ynes Mexia.

The epithet is derived from the type locality.

== Distribution and habitat ==
It is native to Peru. It grows as a terrestrial or epiphytic herb. It grows on wet tropical biomes.

== Conservation ==
This species has been assessed as threatened in a preliminary report.
