= Nina Floy Bracelin =

American botanist (1890–1973)

- Born: March 24, 1890; Star Lake, Minnesota, United States
- Died: July 8, 1973 (aged 83); Berkeley, California
- Occupations: Botanist, plant collector, scientific illustrator
- Years active: 1929-1952

Academic background
- Education: University of California, Berkeley

Academic work
- Institutions: University of California, Berkeley; United States Department of Agriculture; California Academy of Sciences

Nina Floy Bracelin was a botanist, plant collector, and scientific illustrator.

A fuchsia, Fuchsia bracelinae, is named after her. A willow, Salix lesiolepis bracelinae, is named after her. She was given a lifetime membership to the California Academy of Sciences.

She worked extensively with Ynes Mexia and with Alice Eastwood.

The standard author abbreviation Bracelin is used to indicate this person as the author when citing a botanical name.
