= Kate Rice =

Canadian prospector

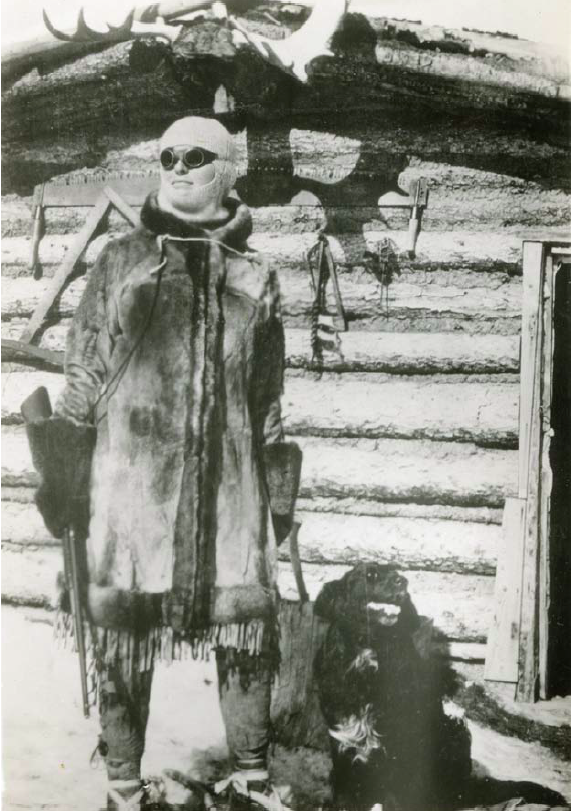
- Kate Rice outside her cabin on Wekusko Lake
- Born: December 22, 1882; St. Marys, Ontario, Canada
- Died: January 2, 1963 (aged 80); Minnedosa, Manitoba, Canada
- Other names: Mooniasquao, "The Red Lady", "Lady of the Lake"
- Education: University of Toronto
- Occupations: Prospector, Writer, Trapper, Math Professor
- Known for: First woman prospector

Kate Rice (December 22, 1882 – January 3, 1963) was a Canadian prospector, adventurer, and writer from Ontario who homesteaded, prospected and mined in northern Manitoba. She garnered widespread attention for her adventurous life, brilliant mind, statuesque beauty, and for succeeding in the mineral industry, which very few women were engaged with at the time.

== Early life and family ==
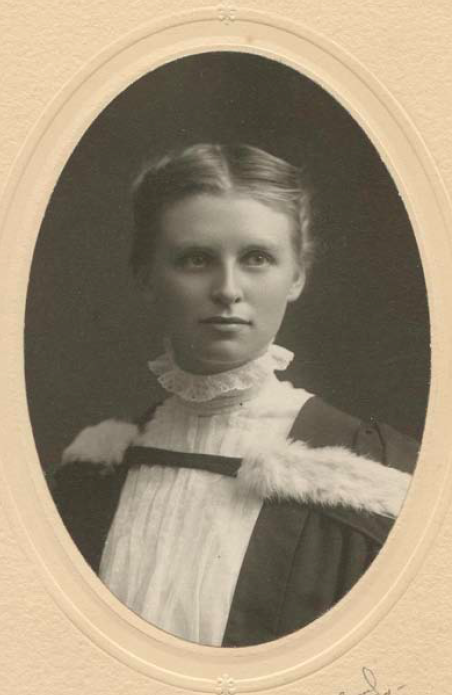
Rice at the University of Toronto

Kathleen Creighton Starr Rice was born in 1882 to Henry Lincoln Rice (1857–1933) and Charlotte "Lottie" Carter Rice (1862–1941), an upper-middle-class family in St. Marys, Ontario. Her father struggled with the changing business climate as a grain merchant who had inherited full shares in Carter Milling Co. after the death of his father-in-law, founder George Carter (1826–1899), who was a native of Tipperary, Ireland.

Her paternal grandfather, Rev. Dr. Samuel Dwight Rice (1815–1884), was a progressive Methodist Minister who had founded a college for women in Hamilton. H.L. Rice taught his daughter to canoe and to camp along the St. Mary's River, at the age of six, regaled her with tales of Daniel Boone, and imparted a life-long taste for adventure and the outdoors.

== Education and career ==
Rice attended the University of Toronto, winning the Edward Blake Scholarship twice. She studied Mathematics, Physics and Astronomy, graduating in 1906.

In 1908, Rice moved west to Tees, Alberta, where she taught at a summer school. She then took a position as a Professor of Mathematics at Albert College, in Belleville, Ontario, then taught in Yorkton, Saskatchewan during 1911 and 1912. She there began to explore the Canadian Rockies, and took up mountaineering, mainly in the Cascade Mountains. This became her passion, and she later joined the Alpine Club Of Canada.

At the age of 29, Rice decided she wanted to homestead, and to participate in the opening of Canada's "new frontier" in the North. Since, until 1929, women were not considered legal persons in Canada, and so were prevented from owning property or holding legal title to homesteads, Rice enlisted her brother, Lincoln, to purchase 6 km (3.7 mi) for her, in his name, north of The Pas, Manitoba. Rice began to farm in 1913.

== Prospecting ==
Soon after Rice moved to The Pas, there was word of gold being discovered 90 km (56 mi) north on Beaver Lake. Rice began studying prospecting and read everything she found on geology. She befriended local Cree, learned their language, and learned to hunt and trap animals. In 1914, Rice borrowed money, a "grubstake", from an old college friend, and hired a Cree guide to take her north to Beaver Lake by dogsled. She then traveled further north by canoe to Brochet to begin prospecting. On this first foray Rice discovered zinc showings at Reindeer Lake, but did not stake the claim, as there was no railway to the area and it would be difficult to develop.

In 1915, she took her own dog team to explore the Beaver Lake area where she went on to stake her first claims. During this time Rice hired "Old Isaac" a local Cree Elder, to teach her how to trap, hunt, mush dogs, and shoot. The local Cree called her "Mooniasquao" ("white woman").

The following year, Rice entered into a partnership with Richard "Dick" Woosey. Woosey was a veteran of the British 18th Royal Hussars Regiment who had fought in the Boer War, in India and along the Afghan border. The two built a remote cabin together and worked as a team until Woosey's death in 1940. While there was frequent speculation about their personal relationship, Rice always insisted it was strictly professional. In 1917, Rice staked more claims at Herb Lake and had them surveyed, proved, and assessed. For several decades afterward, Rice prospected the Wekusko Lake, Herb Lake, and Snow Lake areas, as well as in the Burntwood and Flin Flon mineral belts.

In 1928, Rice visited Toronto, where she began to garner media attention as "...a most picturesque feminine visitor" who was making a name for herself in the notoriously rugged world of northern trapping and prospecting. (Rice was hard to overlook, standing six feet tall with bobbed golden blonde hair.) For years afterwards, the Toronto Star would hound her while she was on her regular visits south to see her parents and international papers as far away as Australia would regularly record her exploits. Rice occasionally wrote well-received articles for the Toronto Star about topics of more interest to her than to tabloid journalism.

Rice was once offered $500,000 for one of her claims, but decided to hold out for twice that amount. Unfortunately, the buyer eventually walked away and she was only able to sell it for $20,000 to International Nickel (INCO). Rice and Woosey were later sued by C. E. Hermann, a former associate, for breach of contract involving another claim that was valued (for a time) at $5 million. Her many copper and nickel discoveries ultimately led to the development of large mining operations and the creation of the mining hub of Thompson, Manitoba.

== Later years ==
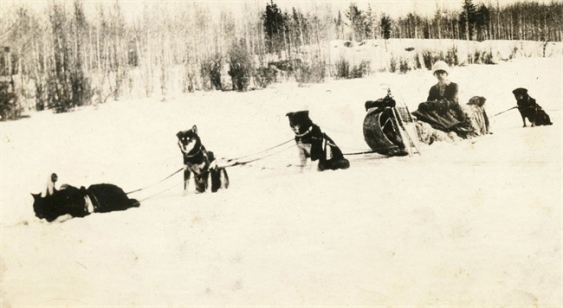
Rice with her sled dog team

From 1940 onwards, Rice lived in her log cabin on her island on Wekusko Lake, writing, gardening, fishing, trapping, and prospecting in her small 12 ft canvas canoe "Duckling". She wrote several articles in scientific journals about meteorological and astronomical observations she had made in her travels through Canada's north. She became well known, as well, for her ability to raise and train sled dogs, and for her skill in mushing them without resorting to the use of a whip.

After so many years living in isolation on her island, Rice became worried for her own sanity. She left the wilderness in 1960 at the age of 77 to check into the Brandon Mental Institution. After examination, the doctors assured her she was not crazy, but rather was "just a prospector". Nonetheless, in 1962 Rice moved herself into a nursing home in Minnedosa, Manitoba where she died a year later. Penniless in the end, she was buried in an unmarked grave.

== Recognition ==
The island upon which Rice lived on Wekusko Lake was officially recognized as Rice Island in 1946. In 2013, a plaque was installed on the island that read: "In Memory of Kathleen 'Kate' Rice. With the aurora borealis illuminating her pioneering trail, her courage and ethics spoke volumes, while her deeds and prospecting helped define the North we know."

In 2009, the Snow Lake newspaper, Underground Press, spearheaded a fundraising campaign to erect a headstone on Rice's grave in Minnedosa which read "Prospector and Pioneer of the North, Extraordinary Woman of the Wilds". A similar stone was erected in The Pas on Dick Woosey's grave.

The Canadian Mining Hall of Fame inducted Kate Rice in 2013.

A relative donated Rice's papers, including an unpublished memoir and drawings, to the University of Manitoba Archives.

== See also ==
- History of Manitoba
- List of Female Adventurers
