= Cassandra De Pecol =

American author, traveler, activist, and speaker

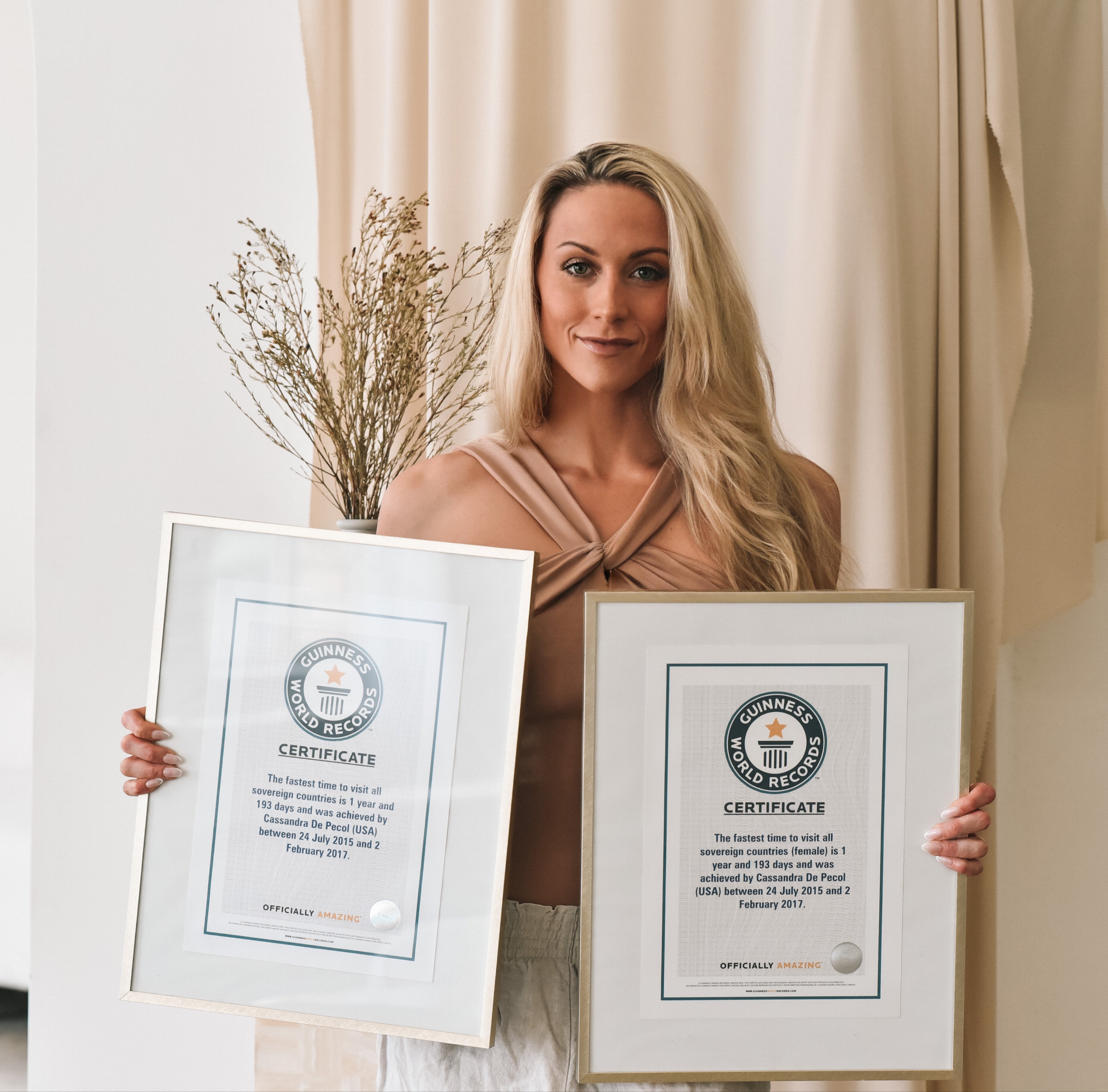
- De Pecol holding her two Guinness World Records
- Born: June 23, 1989 (age 37)
- Occupations: Author, activist, traveler, speaker, social media influencer
- Years active: 2014–present
- Website: cassiedepecol.com

Cassandra De Pecol (born June 23, 1989) is an American author, traveler, activist, and speaker. In 2017, she set Guinness World Records in two categories: "Fastest time to visit all sovereign countries" and "Fastest time to visit all sovereign countries—Female". Both records were broken in 2019.

== Career ==
=== World travel and Guinness record ===
From July 24, 2015, to February 2, 2017, De Pecol traveled to every sovereign nation in the world. In 2017, De Pecol had two Guinness World Records: "Fastest time to visit all sovereign countries" and "Fastest time to visit all sovereign countries - Female". In 2019, both records were beaten by Taylor Demonbreun.

While traveling, she spoke to over 16,000 university students in 40 countries, and acted as an ambassador of peace for the International Institute of Peace Through Tourism and SKAL international.

Though she planted trees to help offset her carbon footprint, she was criticized for taking a large number of flights, as well as for spending only a little time in each country.

The trip around the world cost about US$111,000 and was funded by sponsors that De Pecol obtained throughout the expedition. De Pecol filmed her travels and uploaded them in her social media pages.

=== Other ventures ===
As a public speaker, she spoke in various events like; TEDxMile High, World Domination Summit and Future Leaders in Travel Retreat.

In July 2018, De Pecol released her memoir, Expedition 196: A Personal Journal from the First Woman on Record to Travel Every Country.

== Lawsuit ==
In 2022, De Pecol was sued by Travelers United regarding advertising claims. The lawsuit was dismissed with prejudice in August 2026.

== Reality television appearance ==
On December 8, 2013, DePecol appeared on the show Naked and Afraid in a special called "Double Jeopardy".

== See also ==
- Dorothy Pine
