= Taylor Demonbreun =

American world traveler

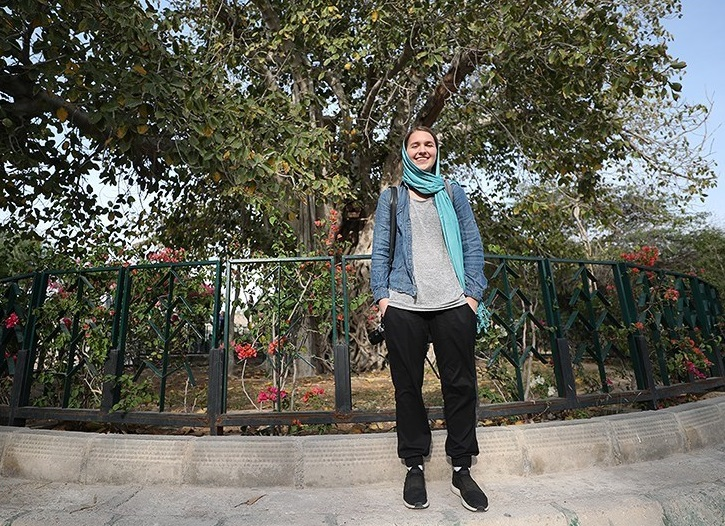
- Taylor Demonbreun in 2018
- Born: October 21, 1994 (age 31); Alabama, U.S.
- Occupation: World traveler
- Website: trekwithtaylor.com

Taylor Demonbreun (born October 21, 1994) is an American world traveler who formerly held the Guinness World Record for the fastest time to visit every sovereign country in the world. Demonbreun set this record on December 7, 2018, after traveling for one year and 189 days, having started on June 1, 2017. The record was previously held by Cassandra De Pecol. She was 24 years old when she achieved the record. She previously held the record as the youngest person to travel to all the world's countries.

Demonbreun is from Tuscaloosa, Alabama, United States.
