= Charlotte Cameron =

American born British author

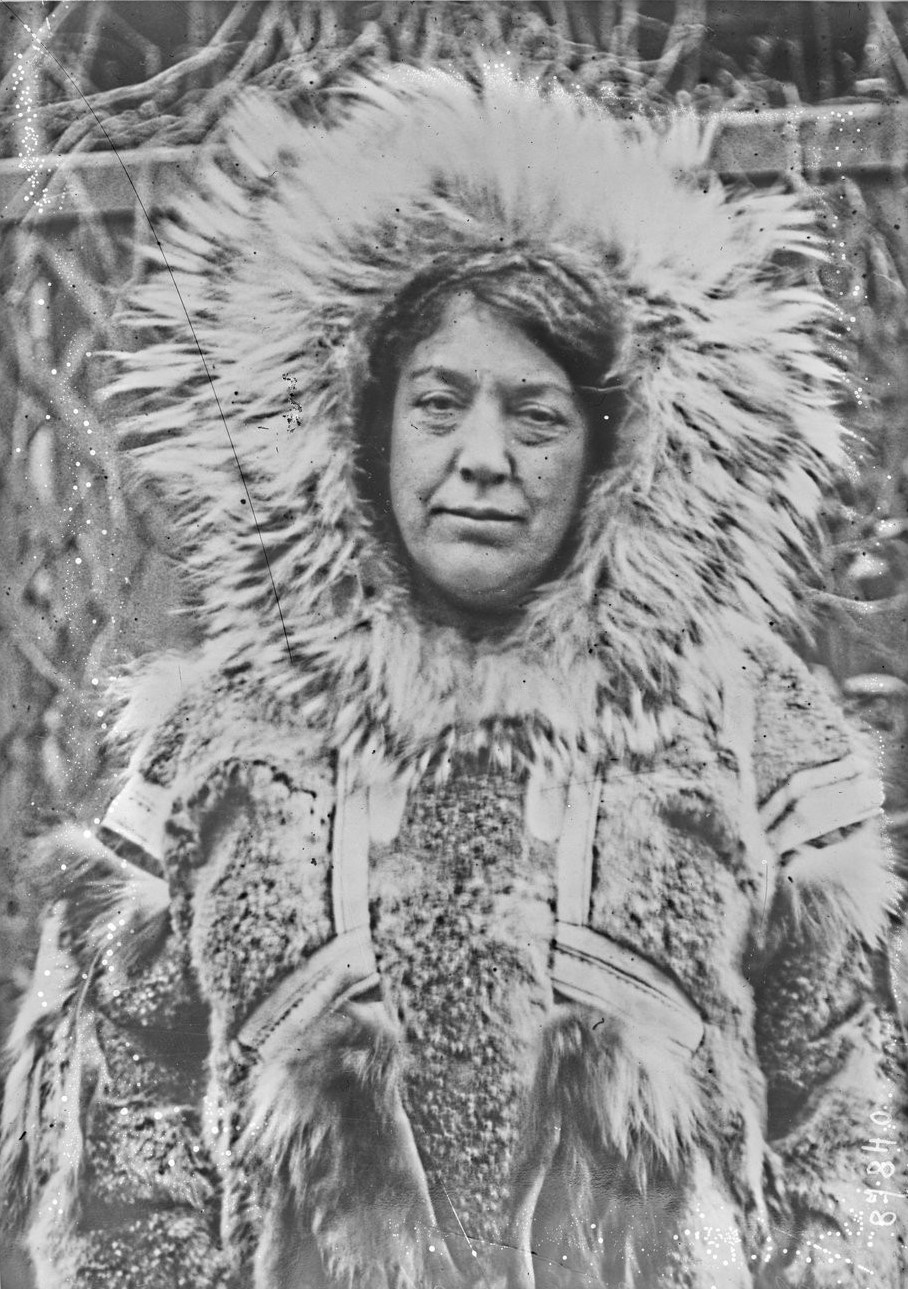
- in 1923
- Born: April 14, 1869; Rhode Island
- Died: December? 1946; UK
- Occupation: Travel writer
- Writing career
- Pen name: Charlotte Cameron

Charlotte Cameron FRGS OBE (née Almy, 1869/1872 or 1873 – 9 December 1946) was an American traveller, imposter and author. She reinvented herself as Charlotte Cameron devising a husband and new parents to establish herself as of British nationality,

== Biography ==
Cameron was actually born in Portsmouth, Rhode Island, USA. She was the daughter of Frances (Fanny) Sisson Faulkner, a suffragette (1847-1920) and Jacob Wales-Almy, a captain in the Royal Navy (1838 - 1919). They divorced and she was brought up by her mother and her family. She took the last name of Almy-Wales from her maternal grandmother who had been born into the Wales family. She married a prosperous Scottish born farmer named John Sanderson. However, he was already married and when the debts mounted he disappeared. In around 1900 she came to Britain and reinvented herself as born in the British city of Portsmouth and the widow of a man named Major Donald Cameron of the 42nd Highlanders and the daughter of a Royal Navy Captain.

Cameron travelled extensively and wrote about her travels. She travelled to Scotland in 1893, and in 1904 travelled as a companion to a wealthy Englishwoman. In 1913 the Royal Geographical Society finally admitted the absurdity of publishing papers by women but not accepting them as members. Cameron was among the 163 women admitted as fellows that year. A 1996 review of those admitted started with Cameron and Mary Hall noting that they had both crossed Africa.

In 1918 she visited her mother in Portsmouth (in America) and she gave public talks about her travels. She was en route to Hawaii. She told reporters that she was "Lady Cameron" and a fifth generation person from London. In 1921 she visited Australia.

Cameron received the Order of the British Empire following the First World War.

== Death and legacy ==
Cameron died on 9 December 1946 in London, England. Her 2024 biographer notes that Cameron was a travellor and not an explorer. She quotes Cameron's own boast that she travelled every well-trodden path to the very end... but did not go further. It was said that her books ere not of the first quality.

== Personal life ==
Cameron had two marriages: first to the bigamous John W. Sandison (1851–1916) in Manhattan in 1894. Her second husband was Auguste Ernest George Jacquemard de Landresse (b. 1872/3); they married on 29 May 1901, when she gave her name as Charlotte Wales Almy Cameron. They separated in 1903 but they never divorced although she began the proceedings.

== Publications ==
- Cameron, C. (1911). A passion in Morocco. A novel. Stanley Paul & Co: London.
- Cameron, C. (1912). A woman's winter in South America. Boston: Small, Maynard.
- Cameron, C. (1912). A Durbar bride. London: Stanley Paul.
- Cameron, C. W.-A. (1913). A woman's winter in Africa: A 26,000 mile journey. London: S. Paul & Co.
- Cameron, C. (1916). Zenia: Spy in Togoland. London: T. Werner Laurie.
- Cameron, C. (1920). A cheechako in Alaska and Yukon. London: T. FisherUnwin.
- Cameron, C. (1923). Two Years in Southern seas, by Charlotte Cameron. London: T. Fisher Unwin.
- Cameron, C. (1924). Wandering in South-Eastern seas, by Charlotte Cameron. London: T. Fisher Unwin.
- Cameron, C. (1925). Mexico in revolution, an account of an English woman's experiences & adventures in the land of revolution. London: Seeley, Service & Co.
