= Sarah Marquis =

Swiss adventurer and explorer (born 1972)

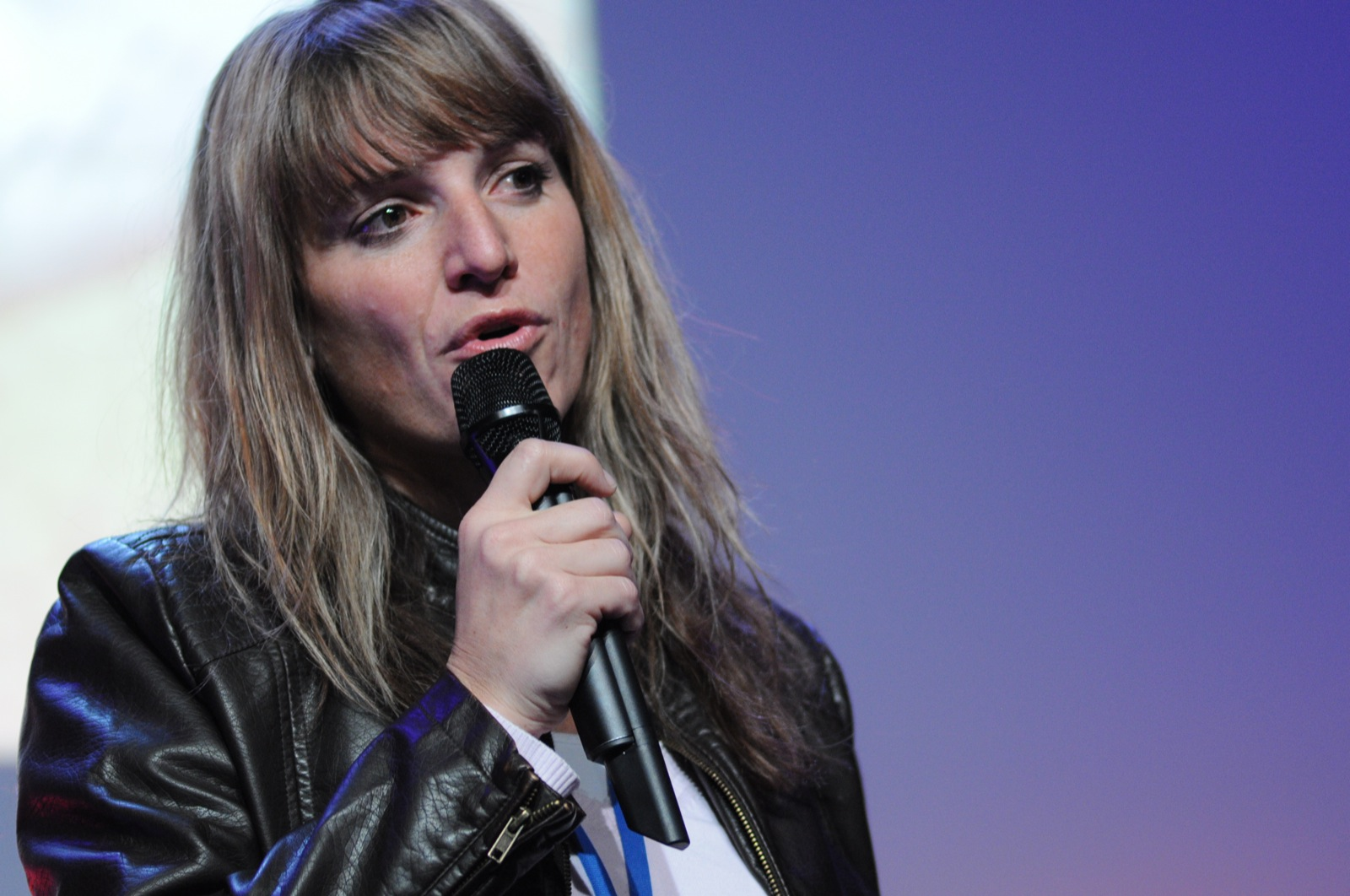
- Sarah Marquis speaking on February 25, 2009
- Born: June 20, 1972 (age 53); Montsevelier, Switzerland
- Occupations: Adventurer, explorer
- Website: www.sarahmarquis.com

Sarah Marquis (born June 20, 1972) is a Swiss adventurer and explorer. From 2010 to 2013, she walked 20,000 kilometres (12,000 mi) alone from Siberia to the Gobi Desert, into China, Laos, Thailand, and then across Australia. In 2011, she gave a TED talk.

== Early life ==
Marquis and her two brothers were raised in Montsevelier, a village in the Canton of Jura in northern Switzerland. Her father worked as a watchmaker for Swatch and her mother was a housewife. She began exploring at a young age, and at sixteen years old she took up a job with a European train company so that she would be able to travel for free. At age seventeen she traveled to Turkey, where she rode a horse across the Central Anatolia Region.

== Adventuring ==
Marquis cites a trip she took to New Zealand in her twenties as the first time she "actually got in touch with the wild": she spent a month in Kahurangi National Park without bringing any food. Her subsequent travels included canoeing through Algonquin Provincial Park in Canada, camping in Patagonia, and hiking the United States' Pacific Crest Trail in 2000. In 2002–2003, she walked seventeen months inside Australia's outback, covering 8,700 miles (14,000 km). In 2006, she followed part of the Andes from Chile to Machu Picchu 7000 km for eight months.

In 2010, Marquis began a walk from Siberia through Asia and, traveling by boat from Thailand, across Australia. She pulled a 120-pound (54 kg) cart containing her clothes, equipment and supplies. She was evacuated in Mongolia in 2011 after developing a periodontal abscess and returned to her exact location where she continued her journey. Along the route, she was harassed by a group of Mongolian men on horseback, threatened by Laotian drug dealers, and contracted dengue fever. For reasons of security, she sometimes disguised herself as a man and tried not to leave tracks so as not to be followed. She completed her journey in May 2013, when she arrived at a particular tree in the Nullarbor Plain that she had identified on her previous trip to Australia. In total, she walked for approximately 20,000 kilometres (12,000 mi) on her three-year journey.

In 2015, Marquis walked 500 miles across Kimberley in Western Australia where she passed three months and survived in the wilderness.

== Controversies ==
She received the help of a guide and her brother to place water caches along parts of her route. The guide revealed that she used a bike for 500 km and the guide transported her by pick-up to the foot of a volcano. The TV show « Mise au point » of the Télévision suisse romande revealed Sarah Marquis didn't mention this in her book (La voie des Andes).

In April 2024, the fact-checking show Vraiment (Really?) on Radio Télévision Suisse cast doubt her 2018 expedition across Tasmania. After the first revelations of 2010, she had claimed to carry a tracker to prove her walks. She refuses to share her GPS data even to the journalist, adding doubts on the wilderness and off-the-beaten-track status of her trek. It is found she followed marked trails used by recreational hikers. The scientific part of her expedition and collaboration with CSIRO is called into question as her alleged encounter with a Tasmanian tiger, extinct since 1936.

== Awards ==
- 2013 - National Geographic Adventurers of the Year prizes for 2014.

== Books ==
- 2007 - La voie des Andes
- 2014 - Sauvage par Nature ("Wild by nature")
