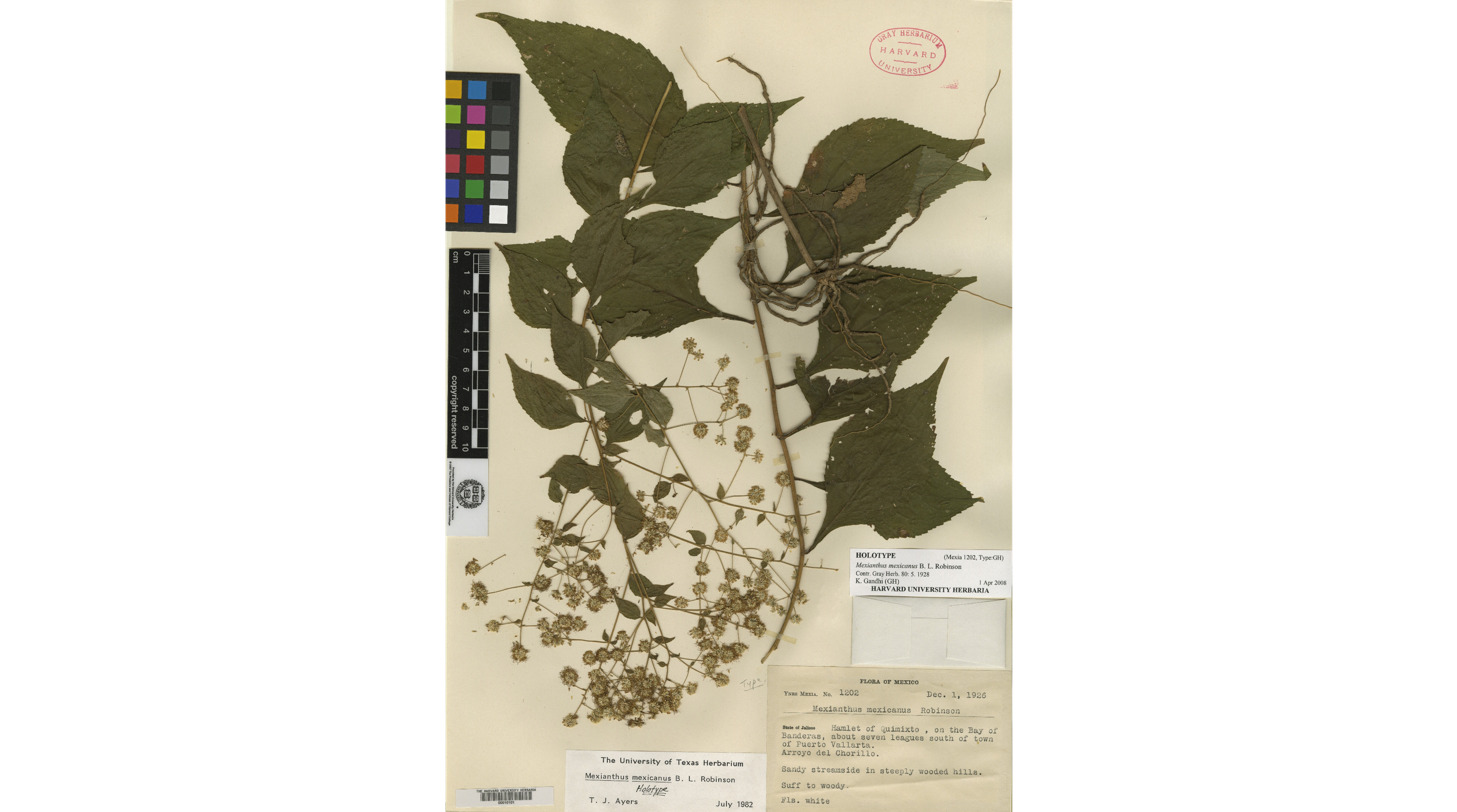
- Holotype specimen

Scientific classification
- Kingdom: Plantae
- Clade: Embryophytes
- Clade: Tracheophytes
- Clade: Angiosperms
- Clade: Eudicots
- Clade: Asterids
- Order: Asterales
- Family: Asteraceae
- Subfamily: Asteroideae
- Tribe: Eupatorieae
- Genus: Mexianthus; B.L.Rob.
- Species: M. mexicanus

Binomial name
- Mexianthus mexicanus B.L.Rob.

= Mexianthus =

Genus of flowering plants

Mexianthus is a genus of Mexican flowering plants in the tribe Eupatorieae within the family Asteraceae.

The genus is named in honor of its discoverer, Mexican-American plant collector Ynés Mexía.

Species

There is only one known species, Mexianthus mexicanus, native to the State of Jalisco in western Mexico.
