= Berthe Cabra =

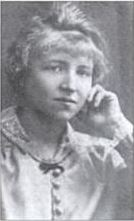
Berthe Cabra c. 1900

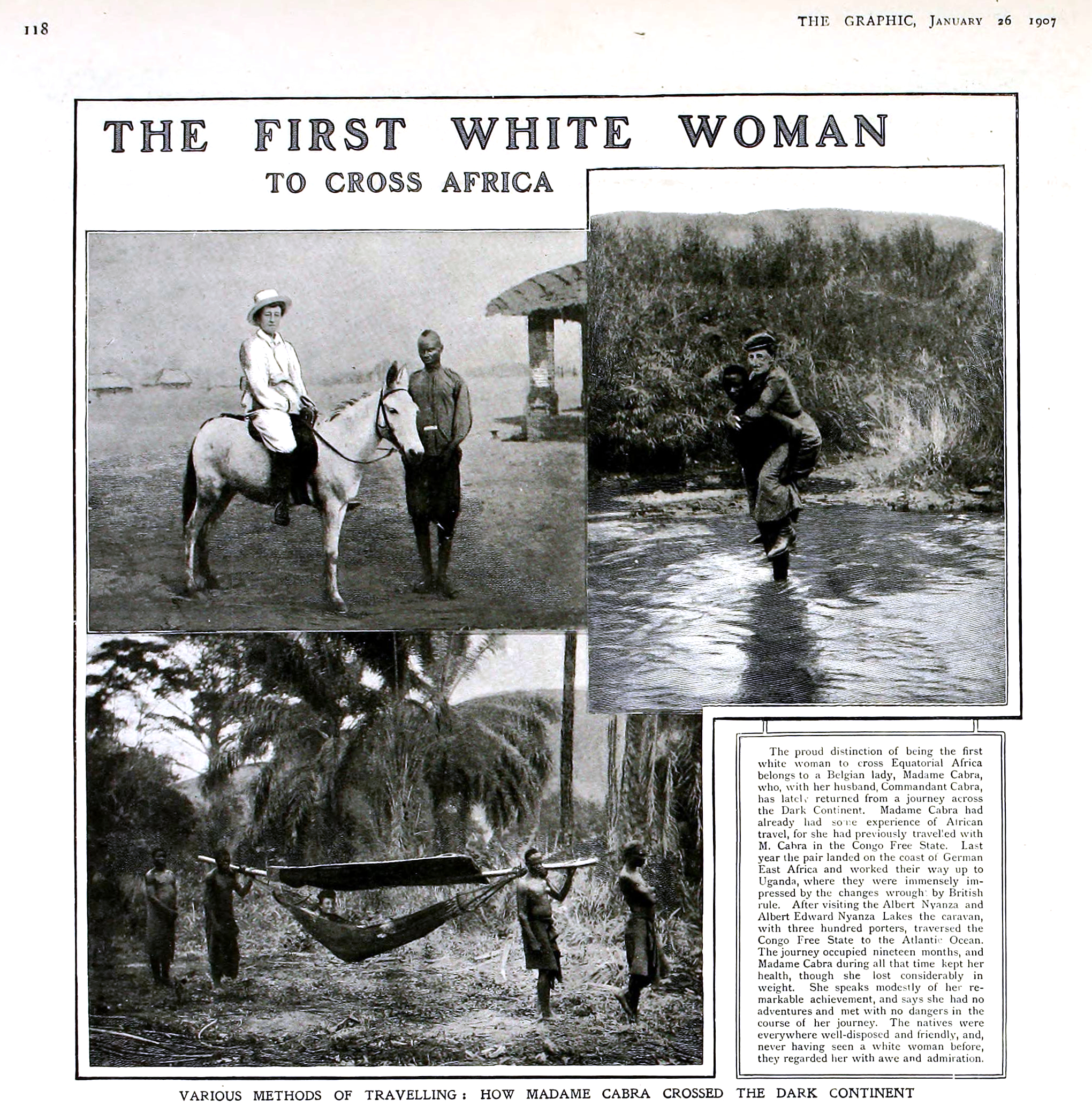
The Graphic (1907) on Madame Cabra's travels

Berthe Jeanne Euphrosyne Wilhelmine Cabra née Gheude de Contreras (27 June 1864, Berchem – 26 January 1947) was a Belgian married to Commander Alphonse Cabra of the Belgian army and the first European woman to travel across Africa from west to east over land. She made her journeys between 1905 and 1906.

== Life ==
Berthe Gheude de Contreras was the daughter of Jean-Martin Gheude and d'Euphrosyne d'Alcantara de Contreras. She married Alphonse Cabra on 25 April 1901 and travelled with him to visit the Manyanga region in 1903. His mission was to delineate the boundary between Belgian Congo and the French colonies. Alphonse suggested that her presence helped in establishing better relations with the French. In 1905 Alphonse was to make another trip to the Eastern Province and territory of Ruzizi-Kivu. King Leopold II allowed Berthe to accompany Alphonse despite his reluctance. The couple left Brussels on 10 April 1905 and travelled from Napoli aboard the Margraff and reached Mombasa in East Africa. They used the railway line to and crossed Lake Victoria using the SS Sybil. They then moved to the foot of Stanley Falls and then down the Congo River to Matadi and finally Boma reaching in October 1906. Berthe's diaries included details on the habits of the people and she acted as a secretary for her husband writing letters for him. One of her letters caused some misunderstanding with the East India Company and may have contributed to difficulties in Alphonse Cabra's colonial career.

The also collected artefacts during the trip which are part of the Royal Museum of Central Africa in Tervuren. The trip earned fame for Madame Cabra and she was a famous figure in the newspapers. The couple settled in Berchem where Berthe died on 26 January 1947.

Cabra received the Chevalier of the Order of the Crown in 1925, Knight of the Order of Leopold in 1926 and the Order of the African Star in 1929. In 1932, she founded a scholarship of 50,000 francs at the Colonial University of Belgium in Antwerp.
