= Béláné Mocsáry =

Hungarian geographer

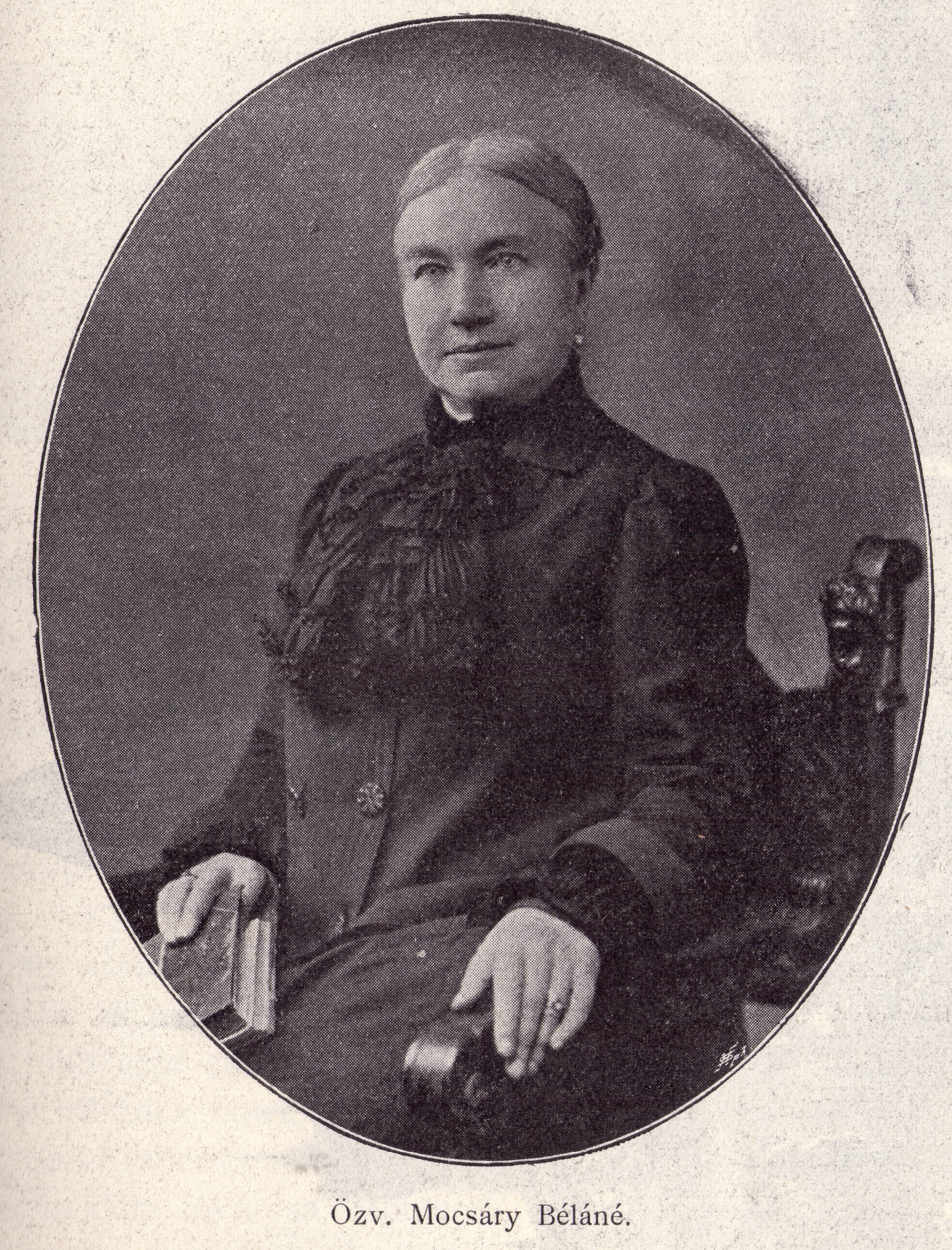
- Born: Mária Fáy; 21 October 1845; Pomáz, Hungary
- Died: 31 July 1917 (aged 71); Nagyfalva, Hungary
- Occupations: Traveler, writer, lecturer
- Known for: Travel writing
- Spouse: Béla Mocsáry
- Parents: Ignác Fáy (father); Franciska Kenessey (mother)

Béláné Mocsáry (1845–1917) was a Hungarian geographer and one of the first people from her country to write extensively about her journeys to Europe, Asia, Africa and North and South America. Sometimes she called herself Mrs. Bélán Mocsáry, Mária Fáy.

== Biography ==
She was born in Pomáz, Pest County, Hungary, on 21 October 1845 with the name Mária Fáy. The daughter of landowners Ignác Fáy and Franciska Kenessey, her mother died when Maria was only one year old, so her father and her father's former guardian, the writer András Fáy, jointly took charge of her upbringing. The financial resources for her lessons were provided by income from the family's land holdings. Between the ages of eight and twelve, she lived in Pest, and then returned home to her father's house in Pomáz, and learned several foreign languages, handicrafts and piano. When she was 14 years old, Maria's father took her to visit Venice, Italy, which ignited her passion for travel, which would keep her on the move for the rest of her life.

She married Béla Mocsáry in 1862 and she adopted her compound name: Béláné Mocsáry Mária Fáy. With her husband, she lived in a small village in Nógrád County, where she enjoyed gardening. In their spare time, the couple would travel extensively, notably visiting Switzerland, Italy, France, Belgium, England, and Germany. However, her husband died in 1890 and Béláné Mocsáry, who had no children, never remarried. Instead, she leased her estates and began a life of travel and travel writing:

Me, who did not know what the sweet hug of a mother was like, whose married life was not blessed by fate with a child whom I could overwhelm with my love, in my solitude I searched for consolation and found peace in the beauties of nature and the dangers of traveling.

In January, 1893, together with her sister, Mocsáry traveled to the Balkans and the Middle East, visiting Greece, Turkey, Palestine and Egypt, even reaching Nubia on the Nile River. It was during that trip that she learned English, which would become helpful on future expeditions.

A few months after her return, she began her first solo journey to fulfill her childhood desire to see India, the Himalayas and the island of Ceylon (now Sri Lanka). The entire trip took her three months. Her first book India and Ceylon's Notes contained 80 photos taken by the author and was published in 1899 by Athenaeum R. Company in Budapest. The book was released again in 1901 and 1902 in expanded form. All the financial proceeds from her books went to charitable organizations benefitting Hungarian housewives and orphans.

After spending some time at home, Mocsáry embarked on transatlantic voyages and twice traveled to North America: once to the United States in 1896, including Alaska, and then to Mexico in 1904. From Mexico, she had planned to continue her journey around the world, but that route closed because of the ongoing Russo-Japanese war (1904–1905). Instead, she went to South America visiting Córdoba, Orizaba, Mexico City, Cuernavaca, Acapantzingo, Guanajuato, and Querétaro.

In her last years, Mocsáry resided on her estate in Nagyfalva (now known as Mogersdorf, Austria). She died there on 31 July 1917.

In some sources, Mocsáry is referred to as "the first Hungarian traveler," which is not true, but she was a very well known traveler of her time.

== Membership ==
Throughout her travels, she was encouraged by the Hungarian Geographical Society of which she was a member. (When the society was founded in 1872, it admitted women as members and claims to have been the first scientific society to do so.) Mocsáry is known to have delivered lectures about her travels to society members at the specific request of their president.

== Selected publications ==
=== Articles ===
According to Venkovits, "Mrs. Mocsáry published travelogues both in the form of newspaper articles and books, illustrated with photographs taken during her journeys. Her articles were published in Ország-Világot (The Country and the World) and Magyar Szalon (English, "Hungarian Salon") as well as in the "Séták a nagyvilágban" (Strolls in the World) section of Uj idõk (English, "New Times")."

=== Books ===
- Mocsáry, Béláné. India and Ceylon's Notes (1899)
- Mocsáry, Béláné. Journey to the East (1901)
- Mocsáry, Béláné Fáy Maria. My Journey on the West Coast of North America. (1902)
- Mocsáry, Béláné. My Journey to Mexico: Travel Notes (1905)
