= Dorothy Pine =

American traveler (1920–2011)

Dorothy May Pine (April 24, 1920 – August 16, 2011) was an American woman who is likely the first woman in the world to travel to every country.

She was born on April 24, 1920, in Lawrence, Kansas, United States, and in later life "when asked what her favorite destination in the world was, her answer would always be Lawrence, Kansas". She had a degree in nutrition from the University of Kansas and was a member of the Kappa Phi sorority.

Her husband Robert Eugene Pine – whom she married on July 26, 1942 – was a naval aviator, and the couple lived on many naval bases around the world. In retirement, they traveled extensively and in 2006 they were recognised by the Colorado Senate and Colorado House of Representatives as the world's most traveled couple.

She died on August 16, 2011, having suffered from Alzheimer's disease in her last years.
