= USS AFDB-2 =

Large auxiliary floating drydock of the US Navy

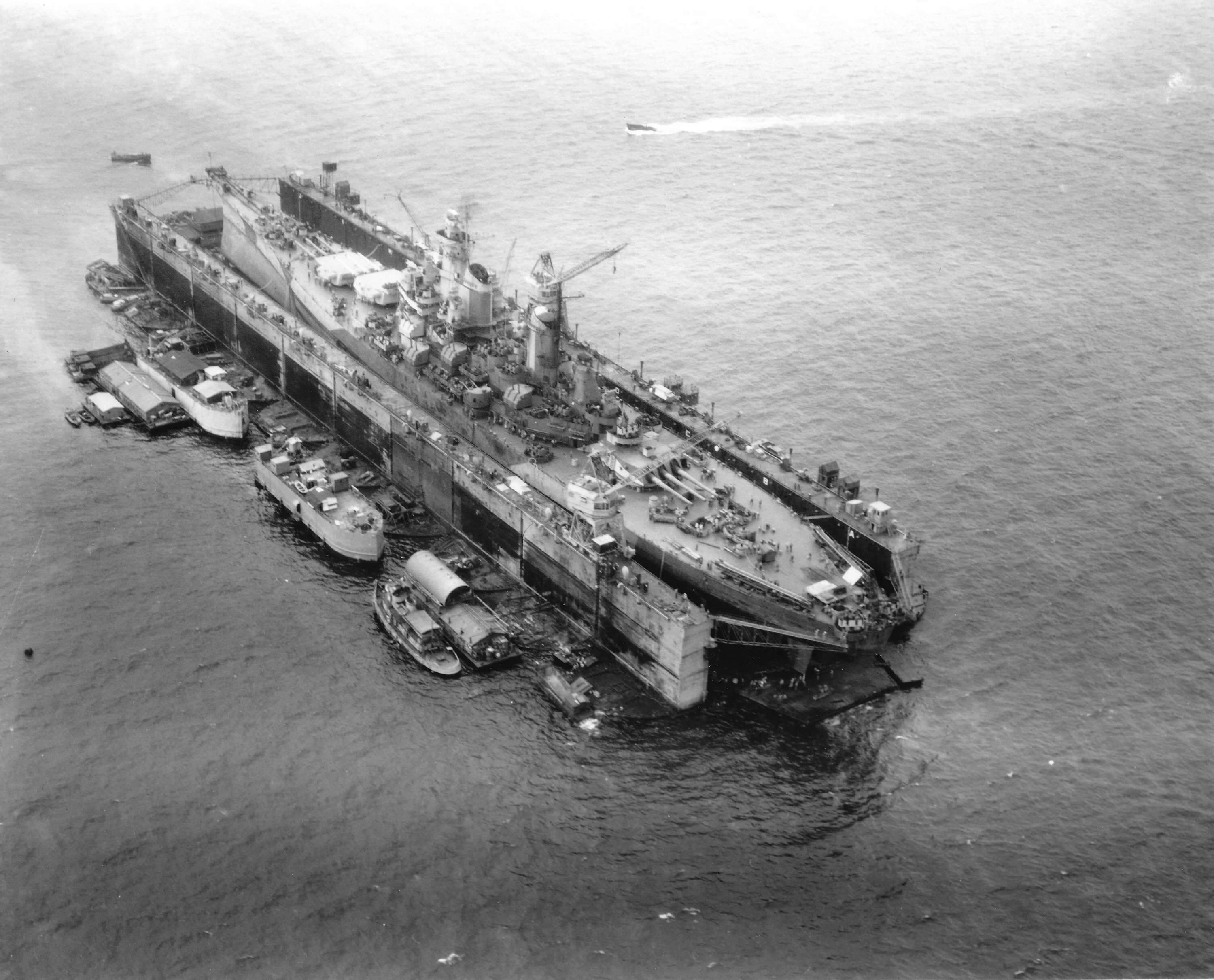
- USS ABSD-2 repairing the USS Iowa in 1945

History

United States
- Name: USS AFDB-2 - ABSD-2
- Owner: US Navy
- Builder: Mare Island Naval Shipyard in Vallejo, California
- Laid down: 1942 and 1943
- Completed: April of 1944
- Commissioned: 14 August 1943
- Recommissioned: August of 1946 to AFDB-2
- Decommissioned: January 1947 from US Navy
- Honors and awards: American Campaign Medal Asiatic-Pacific Campaign Medal World War II Victory Medal National Defense Service Medal
- Fate: See Post-war for fate of each of the 10 sections

General characteristics
- Displacement: 38,500 (in ten sections)
- Length: 927 ft (283 m) (in ten sections)
- Beam: 256 ft 0 in (78.03 m)
- Height: 9 ft (2.7 m) floated, 78 ft (24 m) flooded
- Propulsion: None
- Capacity: 90,000 tons lift
- Complement: 690 officers and men
- Armament: None

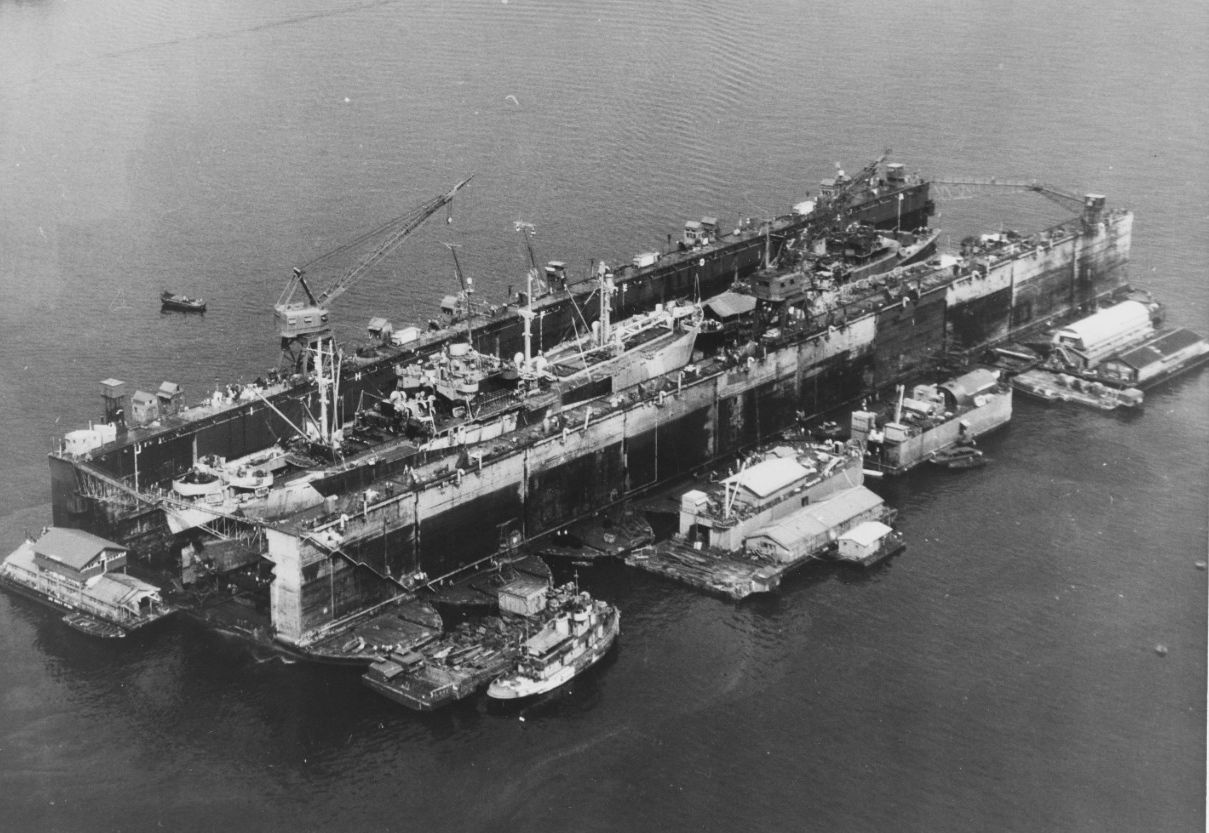
USS ABSD-2 at Seeadler Harbor

USS ABSD-2, later redesignated as AFDB-2, was a ten-section, non-self-propelled, large auxiliary floating drydock of the US Navy. Advance Base Sectional Dock-2 (Auxiliary Floating Dock Big-2) was constructed in sections during 1942 and 1943 by the Mare Island Naval Shipyard in Vallejo, California for World War II. Her official commissioning ceremony took place on 14 August 1943 with CDR Joseph J. Rochefort in command. With all ten sections joined, she was 927 feet (283 m) long, 28 feet (8.5 m) tall (keel to welldeck), and with an inside clear width of 133 feet 7 inches (40.72 m). ABSD-2 had a traveling 15-ton capacity crane with an 85-foot (26 m) radius and two or more support barges. The two side walls were folded down under tow to reduce wind resistance and lower the center of gravity. ABSD-2 had six capstans for pulling, each rated at 24,000 lbf (110,000 N) at 30 ft/min (0.15 m/s), four of the capstans were reversible. There were also 12 ballast compartments in each section.

== World War II ==
The ABSD-2 floating drydock departed 2 May 1944 and made the voyage across the Pacific Ocean in convoys. USS ABSD-2 sections arrived 22 June 1944 and then were reassembled at Espiritu Santo Naval Base, Espiritu Santo, New Hebrides (now Vanuatu), in the South Pacific Ocean. Once assembled on 13 September 1944 she was moved for operation at Seeadler Harbor (also called Port Seeadler), at Admiralty Islands in the Bismarck Archipelago, to the north of New Guinea also called the Manus Islands, after the largest island there at Manus Naval Base. USS ABSD-2 sister ship USS ABSD-4 also worked at Seeadler Harbor during the war. ABSD-2 repaired the large ships in the US Navy and United Kingdom's Royal Navy during World War II. Able to lift 90,000 tons ABSD-2 could raise large ships like aircraft carriers, battleships, cruisers, and large auxiliary ships, out of the water for repair below the ship's waterline. She was also used to repair multiple smaller ships at the same time. Ships in continuous use during war need repair both from wear and from war damage from naval mine and torpedoes. Rudders and propellers are best serviced on dry docks. Without ABSD-2 and her sister ships at remote locations, months could be lost in ships returning to a home port for repair. ABSD-2 had provisions for the repair crew, such as bunk beds, meals, and laundry. ABSD-2 had power stations, ballast pumps, repair shops, machine shops, and mess halls to be self-sustaining. ABSD-2 had two rail track moveable cranes able to lift tons of material and parts for removing damaged parts and installing new parts.

Some of the ships repaired: USS ABSD-2 repaired the battleship USS Mississippi BB-41 on 12 October 1944. On 2 December 1944 the USS Claxton (DD-571) a Fletcher-class destroyer entered ABSD-2 for repair after a kamikaze attack that damaged her off Leyte on 1 November 1944. ABSD-2 repaired the USS Canberra (CA-70) a Baltimore-class cruiser after an attack on 13 October 1944 from an aerial torpedo. ABSD-2 repaired USS Killen (DD-593) also a Fletcher class destroyer with kamikaze damage from an attack off Leyte on 1 November 1944. ABSD-2 repaired the USS Sumter (APA-52) a Sumter-class attack transport on 15 February 1945 for normal repairs. The USS Trinity (AO-13) a Patoka replenishment oiler was in her dry dock from 11 April 1945 to April 18 for normal repairs as she was in continuous use though the war. AFDB-2 repaired the USS Iowa (BB-61) in 1945 before she returned to the States for refit. Due to the Iowa's 37 ft 2 in (11.33 m) draft when full loaded, the battleship had to unload much of her ammunition and fuel oil before entering AFDB-2. The torpedo damaged USS Houston and USS Reno were both repaired at the same time on 8 January 1945.

== Attacked ==
Near the end of the war, on 22 April 1945, a Mitsubishi A6M Zero two seater plane piloted by Shimbo, with Ensign Chuhei Okubo in the second seat, overflew Seeadler Harbor at 14,000 feet (4,300 m). They saw what they thought were two "aircraft carriers", but were actually empty floating dry docks ABSD-2 and ABSD-4. On 27 April 1945 a Nakajima B5N piloted by Takahashi dropped an aerial torpedo. It hit one of the pontoon tanks in section G, damaging the dry dock. She was repaired and returned to service.

After the war ABSD-2 was decommissioned in January 1947

== Post-war ==
Five of ABSD-2 sections, A, B, C, E, F, G, and I were disposed of in various manners in 1990. At the time of this writing, three of her sections, D, F, and H, are still in service.

- Sections A and G were sold for scrapping on 13 July 1990.
- Section B and C were disposed of in support of a fleet training exercise on 13 July 1990.
- Section D was reclassified as a Miscellaneous ship IX-522 om 16 August 1996 and now is currently disposition of NAVSEA as an inactive ship at the On-Site Maintenance Office of Pearl Harbor, Hawaii. In September 2020 it was listed for sale as excess inventory.
- Section F was reclassified as a Miscellaneous ship IX-524 on 19 July 1990, currently disposition at the Pacific Missile Range Facility at Kekaha, Hawaii.
- Sections E and I were sold by the Defense Reutilization and Marketing Service (DRMS) for reuse and conversion on 13 July 1990.
- Section H was reclassified a Miscellaneous ship IX-535 on 10 October 2002 and is currently disposition at Naval Sea Systems Command (NAVSEA) as an inactive ship at the On-Site Maintenance Office, Pearl Harbor, HI.
- Section J was disposed of in support of Fleet training exercise on 13 July 1990.

== Commanding officers ==
- Commander Rochefort, Joseph John, USN from 14 August 1943 to 25 June 1944
- Captain Richardson, George Victor, USNR from 25 June 1944 to 1 April 1945
- Commander. Lawrence, William Raymond, USNR from 1 April 1945 to 24 December 1945
- Commander Lee, Joseph Epps, USNR from 24 December 1945 to 28 February 1946

== Image gallery ==
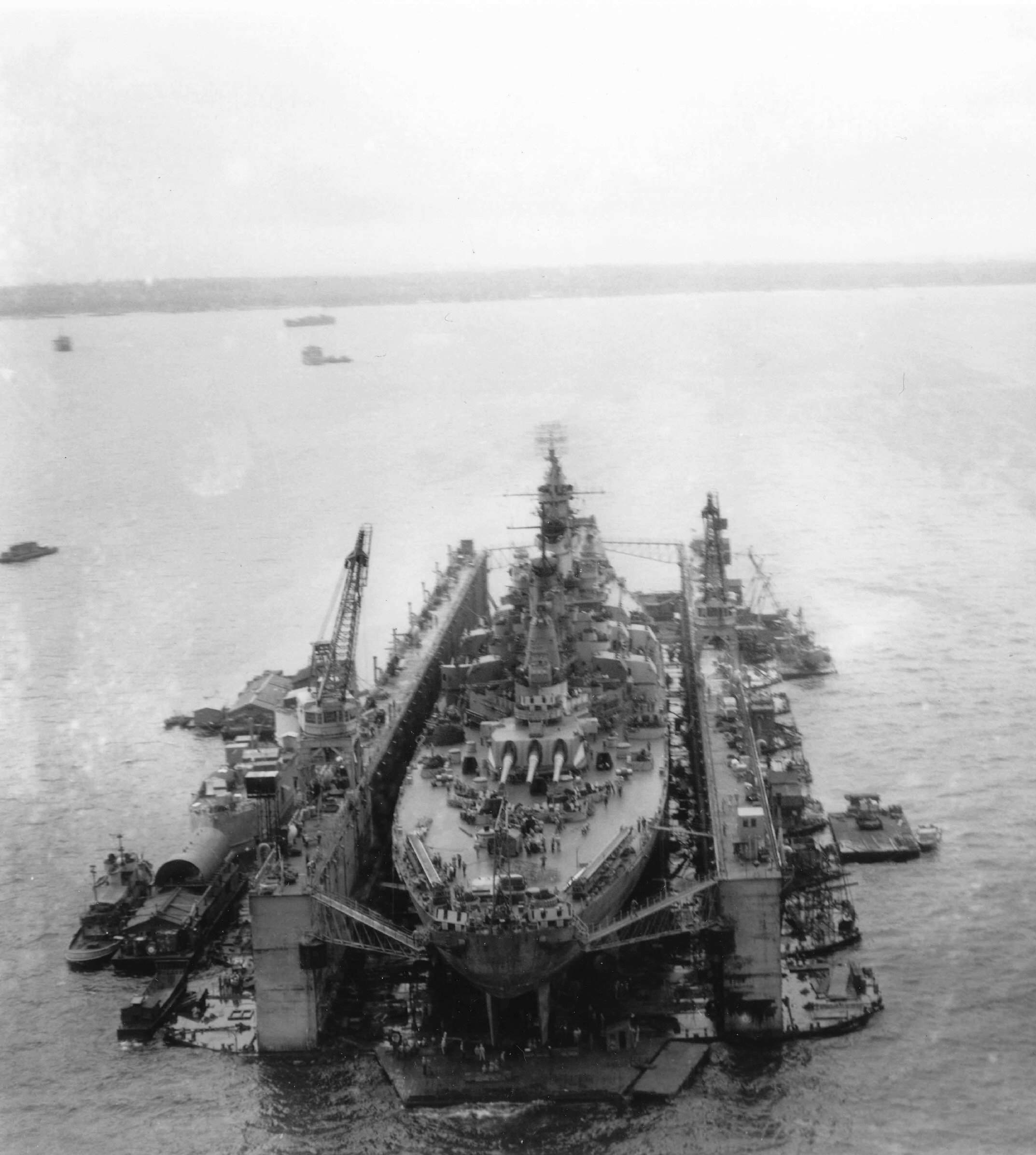
USS ABSD-2 at Manus, Admiralty Islands with USS Iowa (BB-61) in 1945

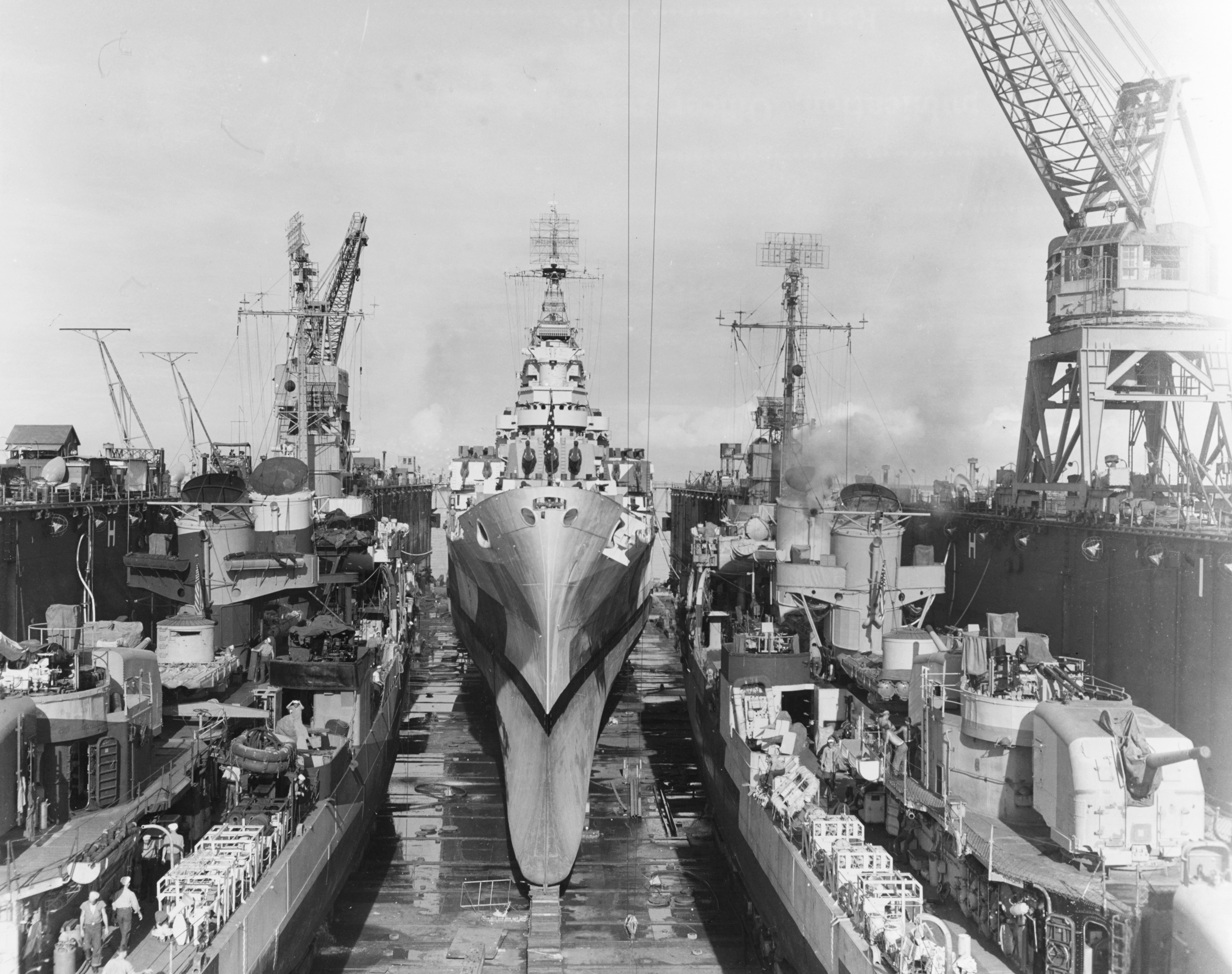
USS ABSD-2 at Manus on 2 December 1944 repaired both the USS Canberra (CA-70) at right, and USS Killen (DD-593) after battle damage off Leyte

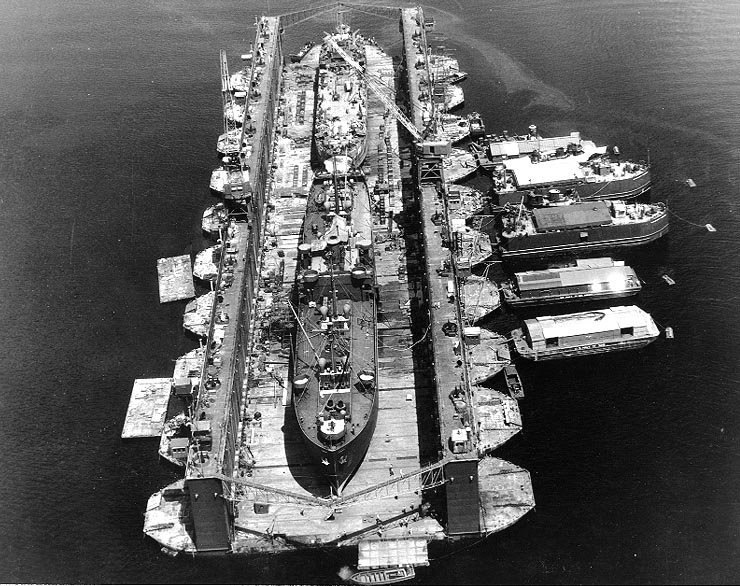
Sister ship: USS Artisan (ABSD-1) with USS Antelope (IX-109) and LST-120 in the dock at Espiritu Santo, New Hebrides Islands, 8 January 1945

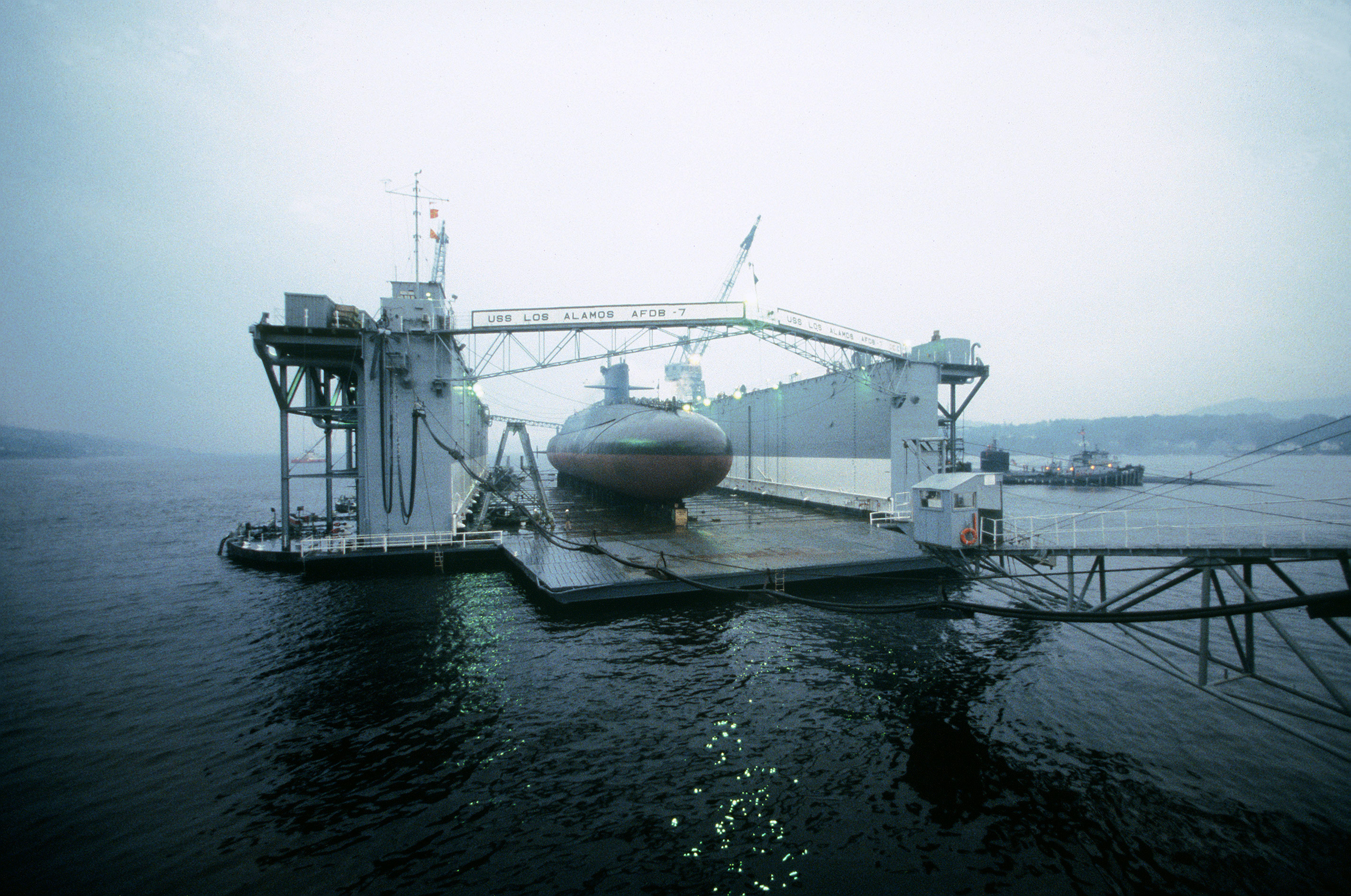
Sister ship: Los Alamos (AFDB-7), with a repaired submarine at Holy Loch, Scotland in 1985

== See also ==
- Dry dock
- Heavy-lift ship
- Hughes Mining Barge
- PD-50, Russia's largest floating dry dock.
- Semi-submersible naval vessel
- Semi-submersible platform
- List of auxiliaries of the United States Navy
