= Seeadler Harbor =

Harbor on Manus Island, Papua New Guinea

Coordinates: 2°01′13″S 147°21′52″E

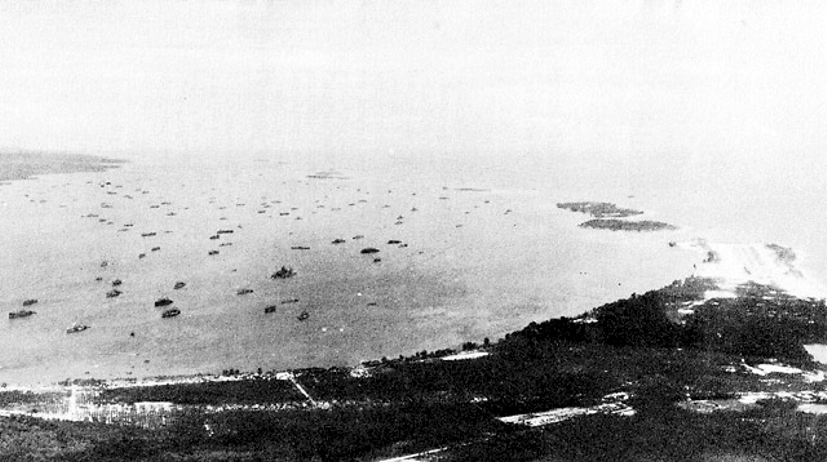
Aerial view of Seeadler Harbor, c. 1945

Seeadler Harbor, also known as Port Seeadler, is located on Manus Island, Admiralty Islands, Papua New Guinea and played an important role in World War II. In German, "Seeadler" means sea eagle, pointing to German colonial activity between 1884 and 1919 in that area. The bay was named in 1900 after the German cruiser SMS Seeadler.

== History ==
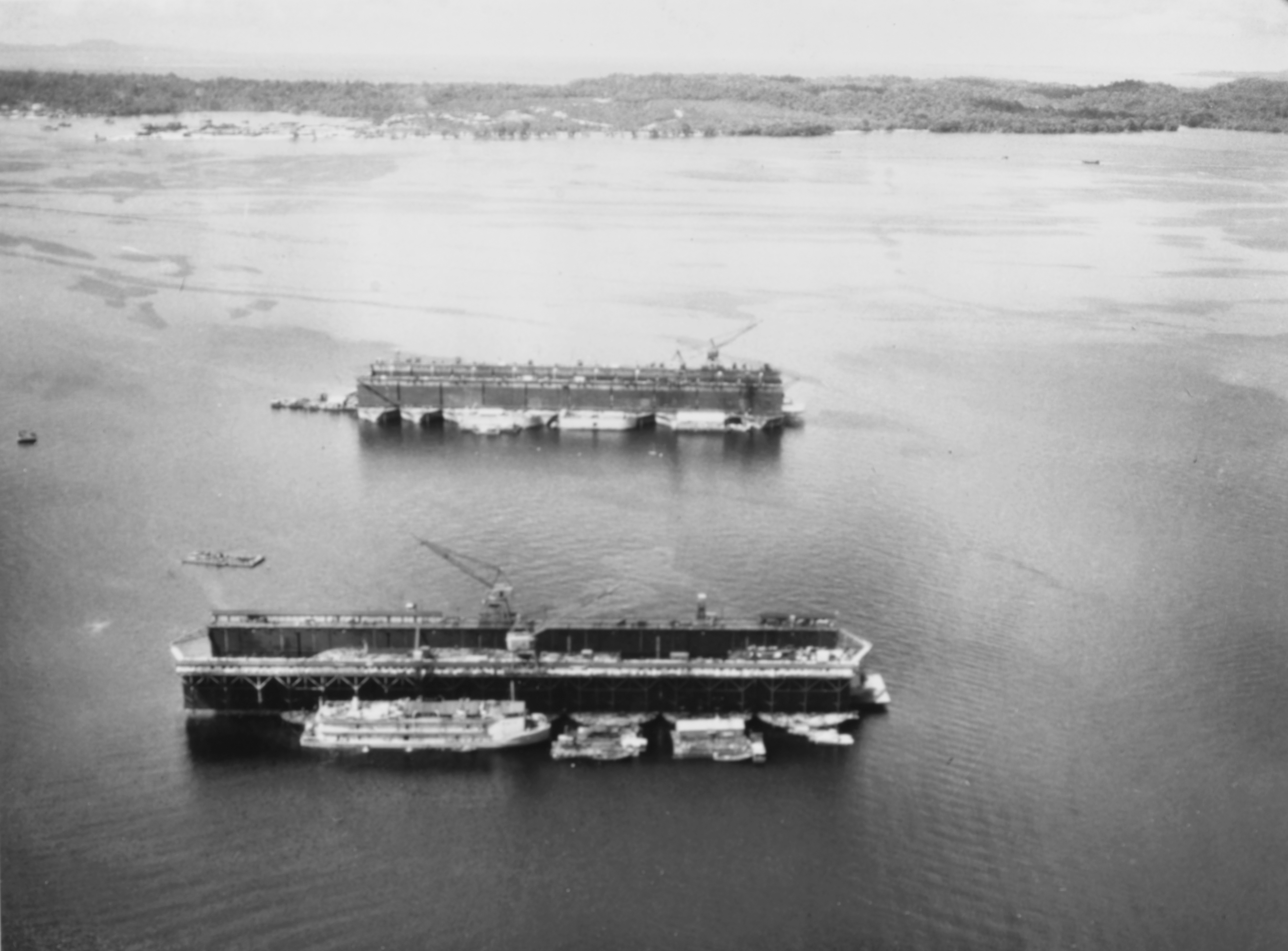
ABSD-4 background in Seeadler Harbor with ABSD-2 (foreground) in September 1945

On 29 February 1944, General Douglas MacArthur led Operation Brewer to take the islands from the Japanese who had occupied them beginning in 1942. The islands were secured by the Americans on 19 March 1944, who then built a large base at Seeadler Harbor including wharves and an airbase, Manus Naval Base. This US Naval Advance Base served as a staging area for further World War II operations in New Guinea and the Philippines.

USS Mount Hood exploded accidentally while moored in Seeadler Harbor on 10 November 1944. The ship was carrying ammunition and the tremendous explosion caused 432 fatalities, 371 wounded, damage to surrounding ships and base from debris and sinking or severely damaging 22 smaller craft.

A Japanese Mitsubishi A6M reconnaissance aircraft reported "two large aircraft carriers" at Seeadler Harbor on 22 April 1945, which were actually the U.S. Navy's Large Auxiliary Floating Dry Docks USS ABSD-2 and USS ABSD-4. Two Nakajima B5N torpedo bombers attacked the floating drydocks five nights later. Both were hit but received only moderate damage to a single pontoon each.

The wrecks of the sections of large auxiliary floating drydock USS ABSD-4 and an Imperial Japanese ship amongst others are located within the harbor.

== Gallery ==
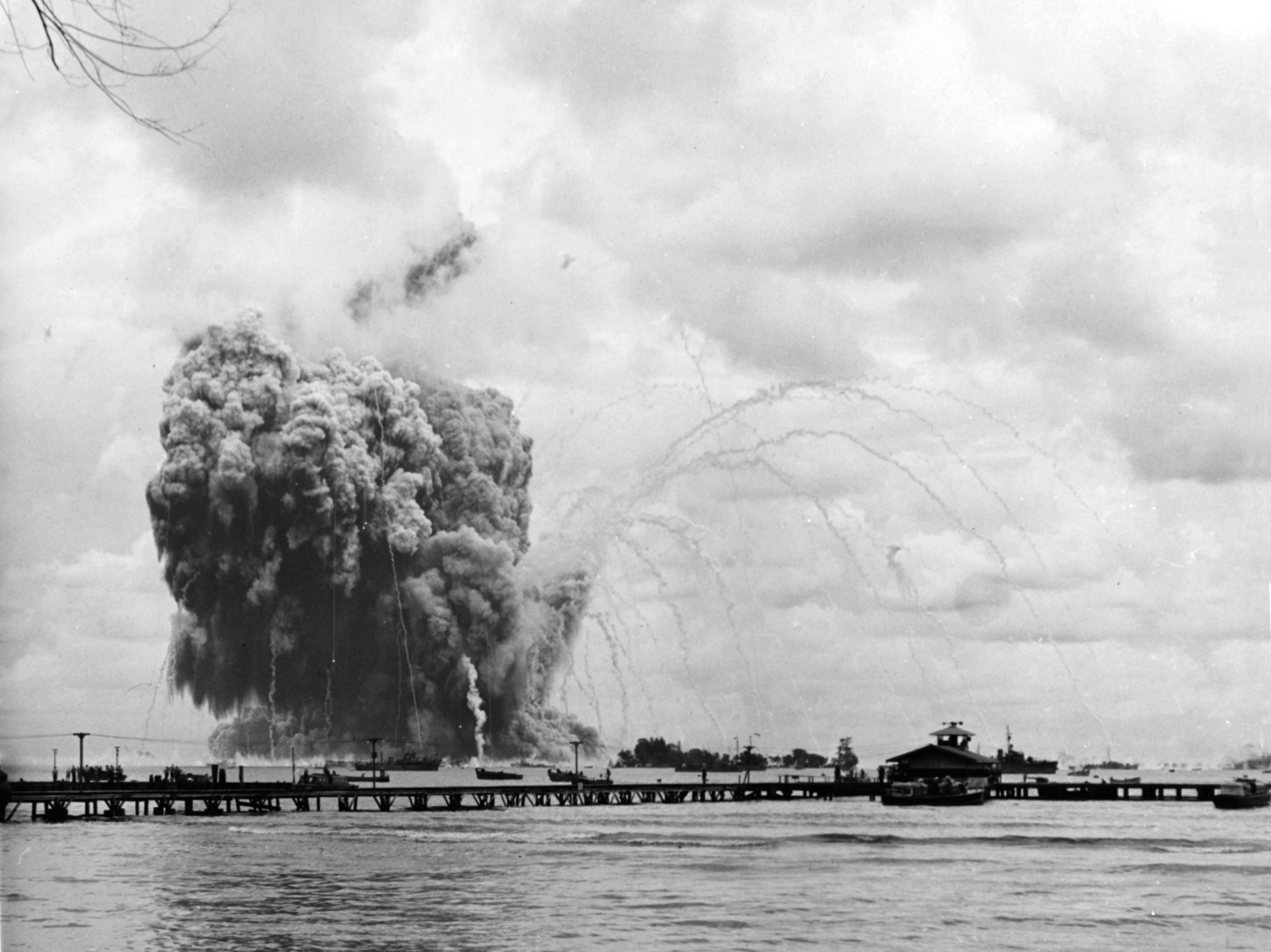
USS Mount Hood explodes: the smoke trails are left by fragments ejected by the explosion.

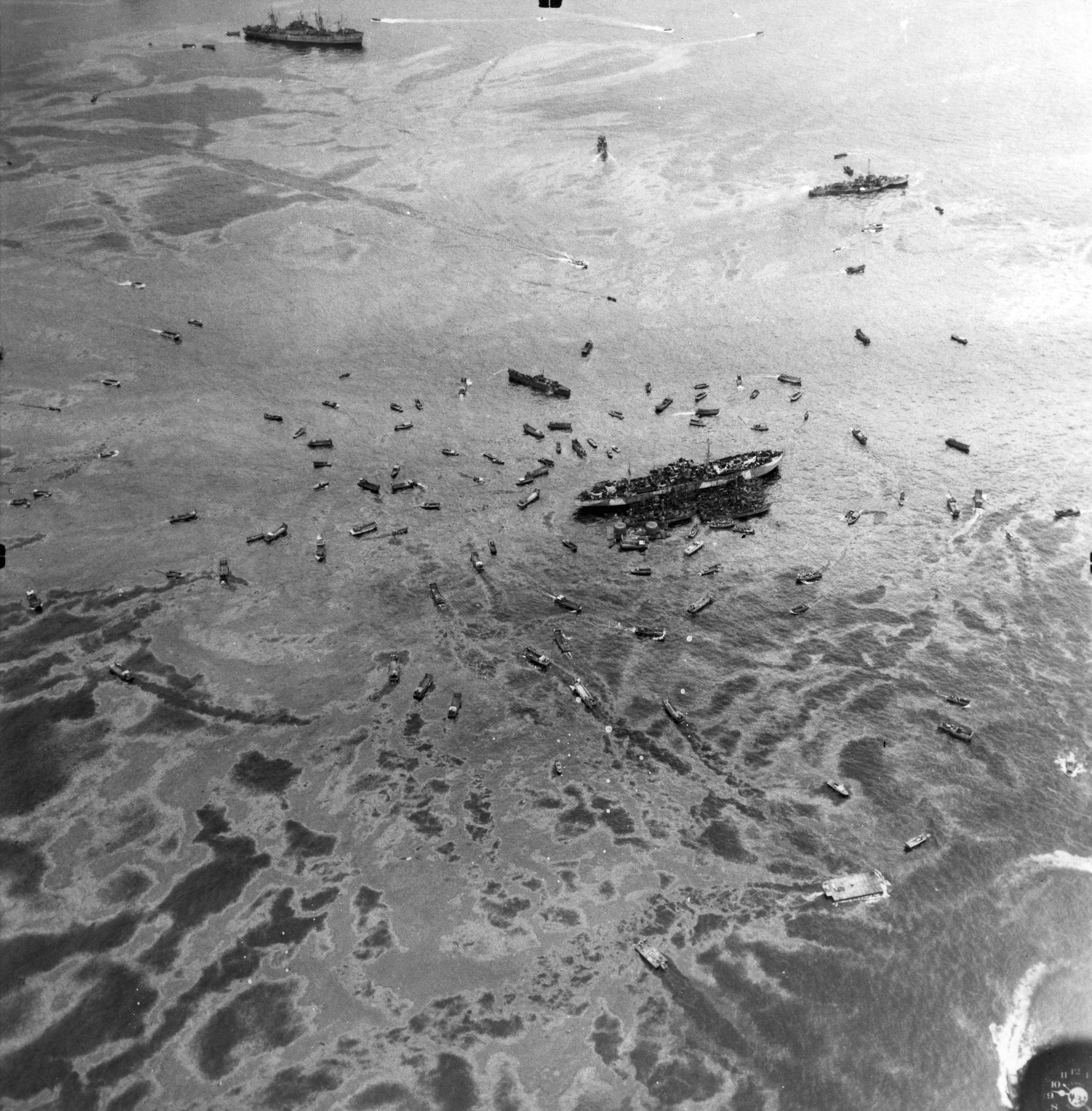
Aerial view of USS Mindanao after the explosion of Mount Hood at Seeadler Harbor on November 10, 1944

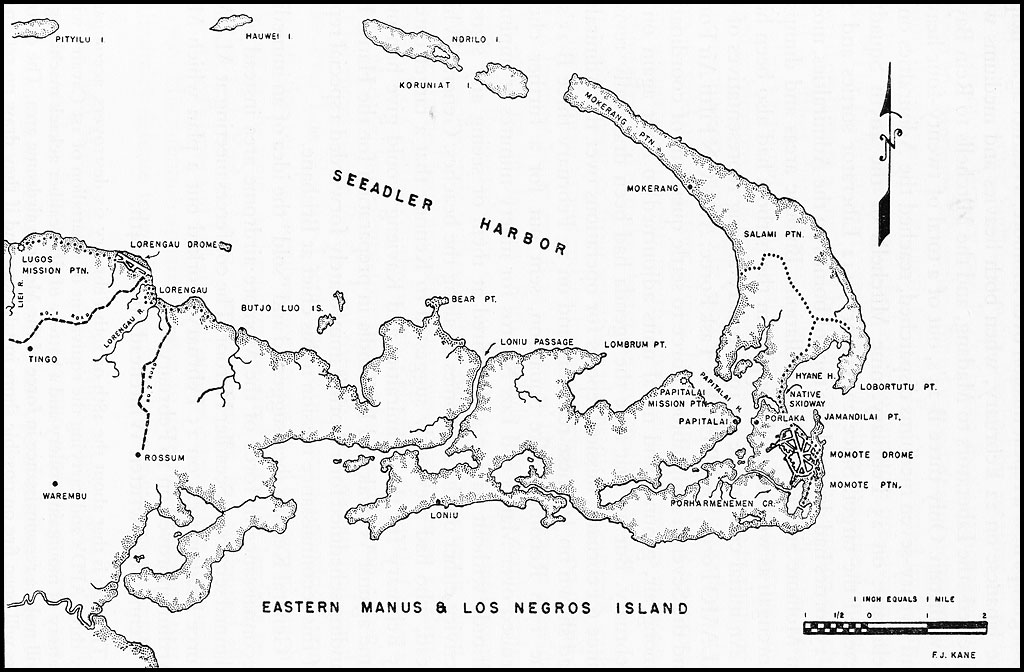
US Navy map Manus Naval Base in 1945

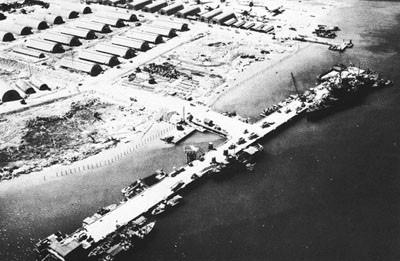
Ship Repair Facilities Manus Naval Base at Lombrum in 1944. Built by 46th Seabees

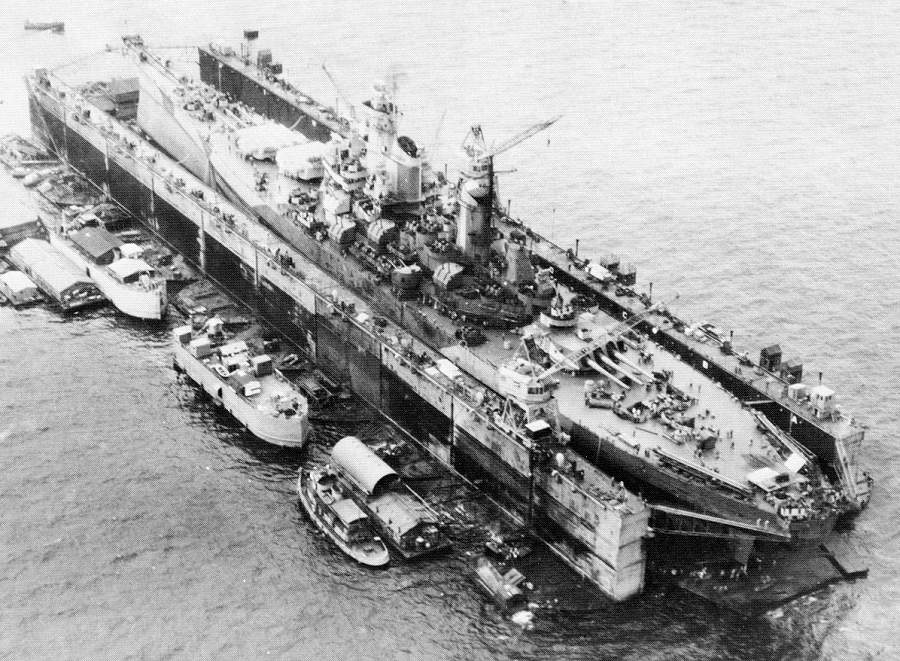
USS Iowa being repaired at Manus Naval Base on December 28, 1944

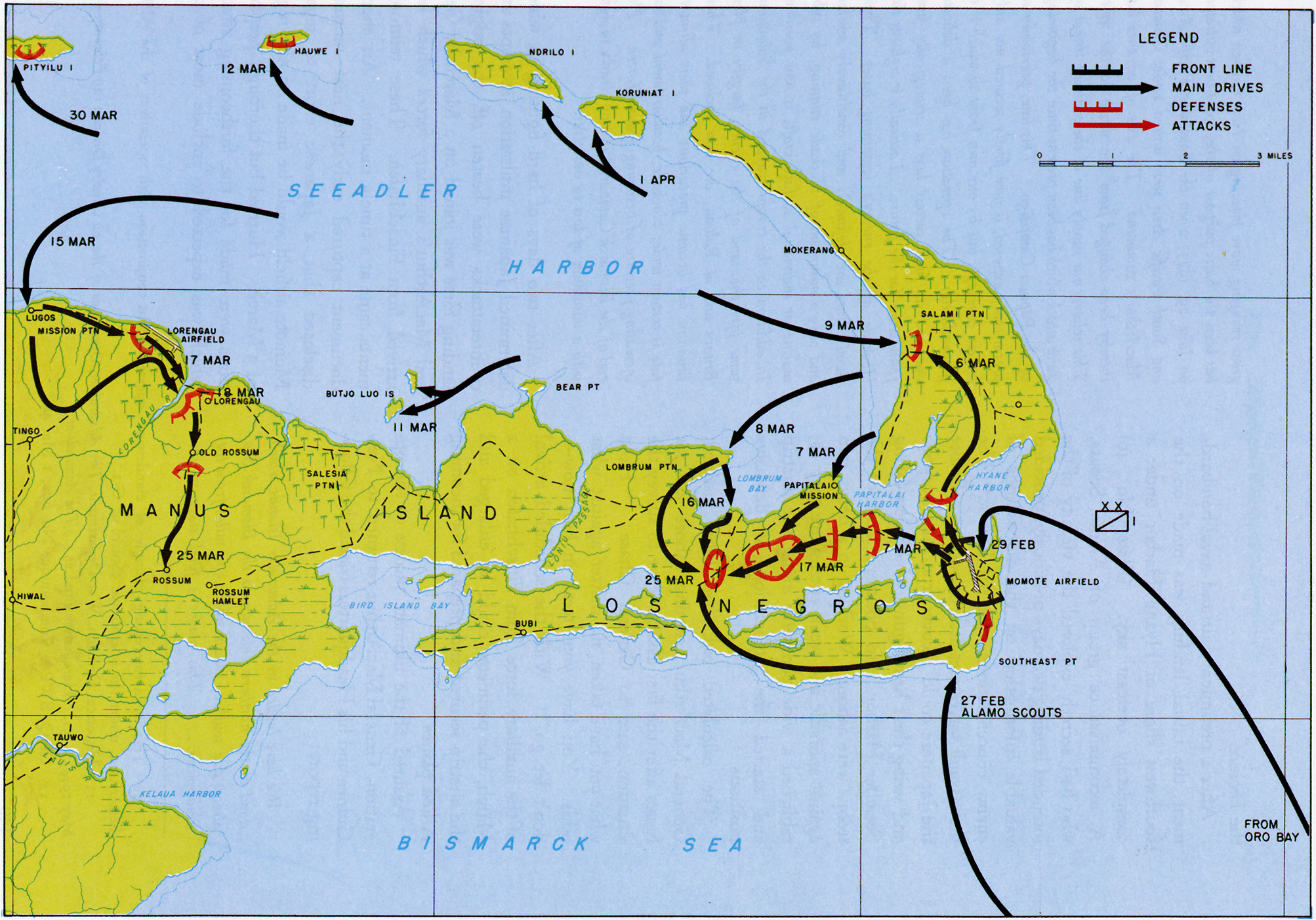
Map Admiralty Islands operations, February 29 to May 30, 1944

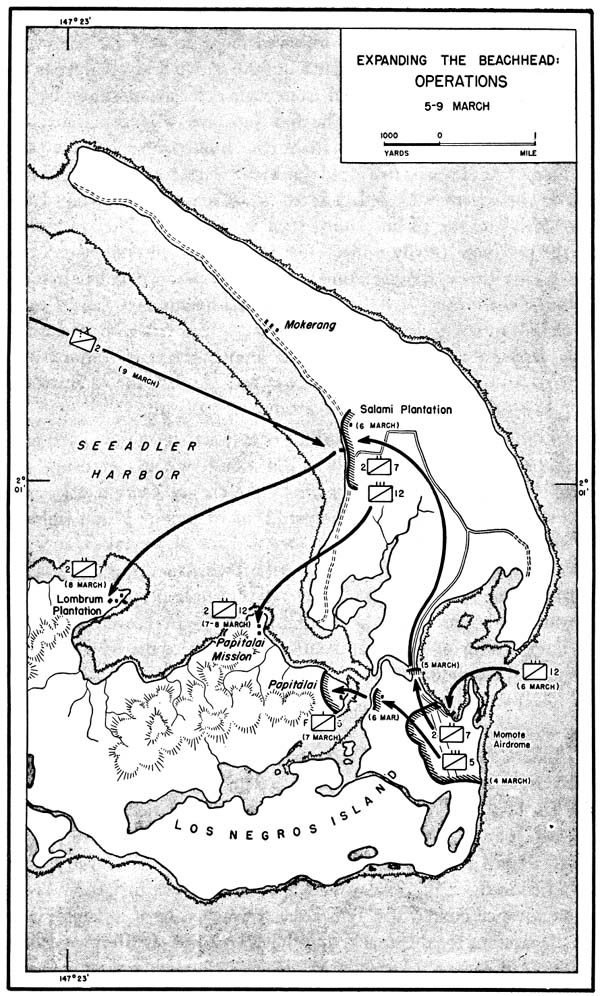
Admiralty Islands map 1944

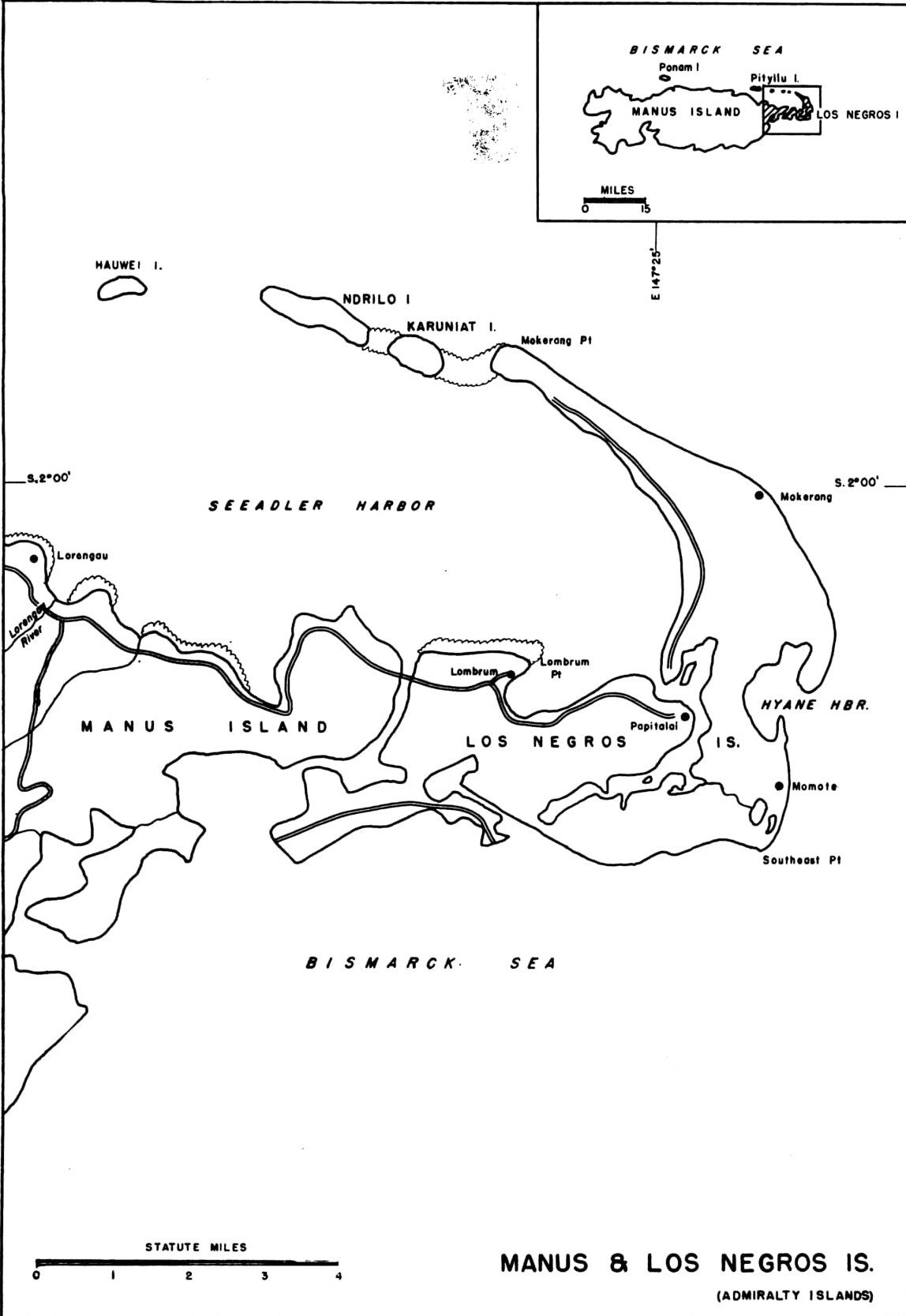
Map of Manus and Los Negros

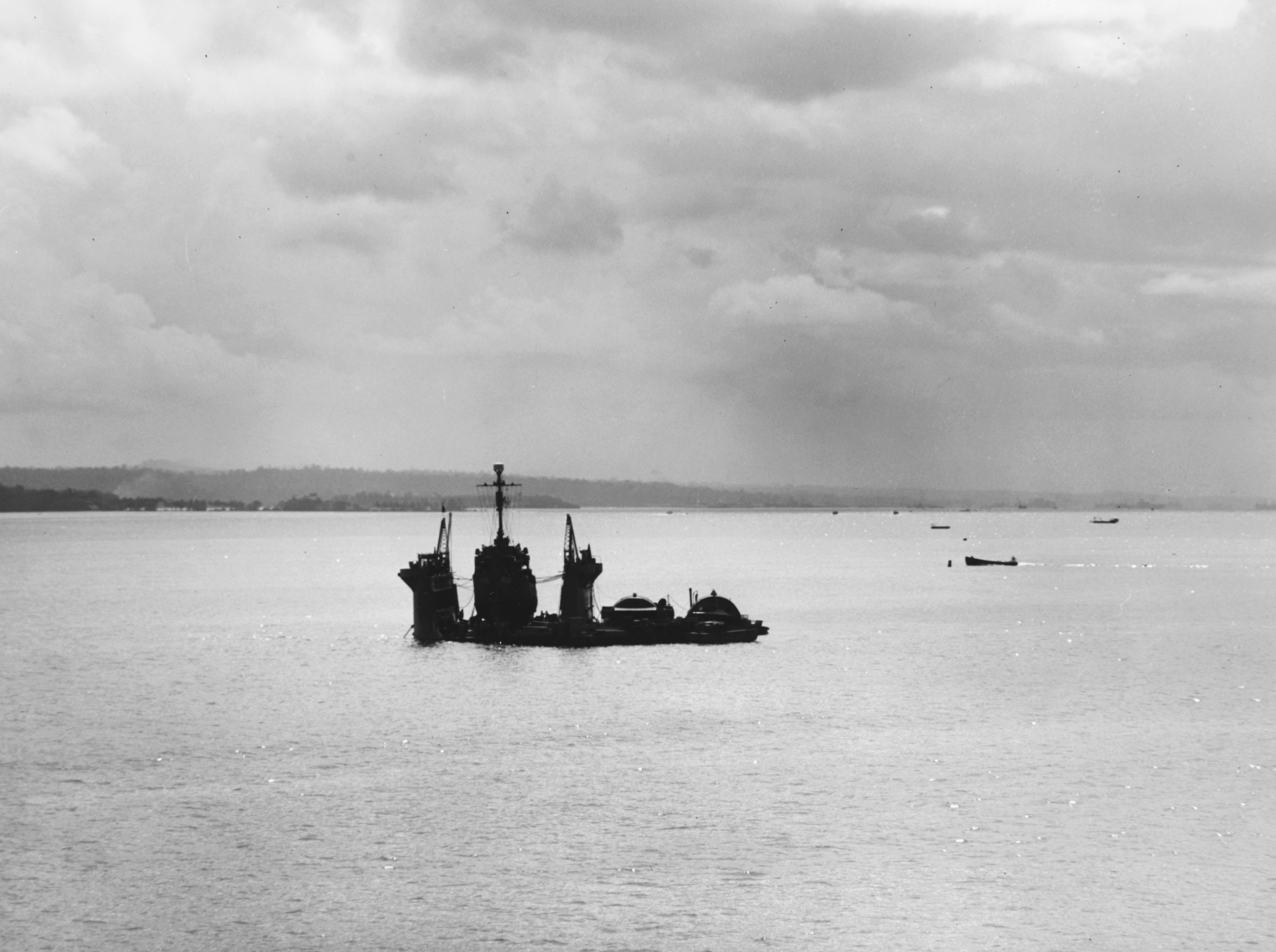
Small Auxiliary Floating Dry Dock, repairing submarine chaser PC-1121 at Seeadler Harbor in September 1944

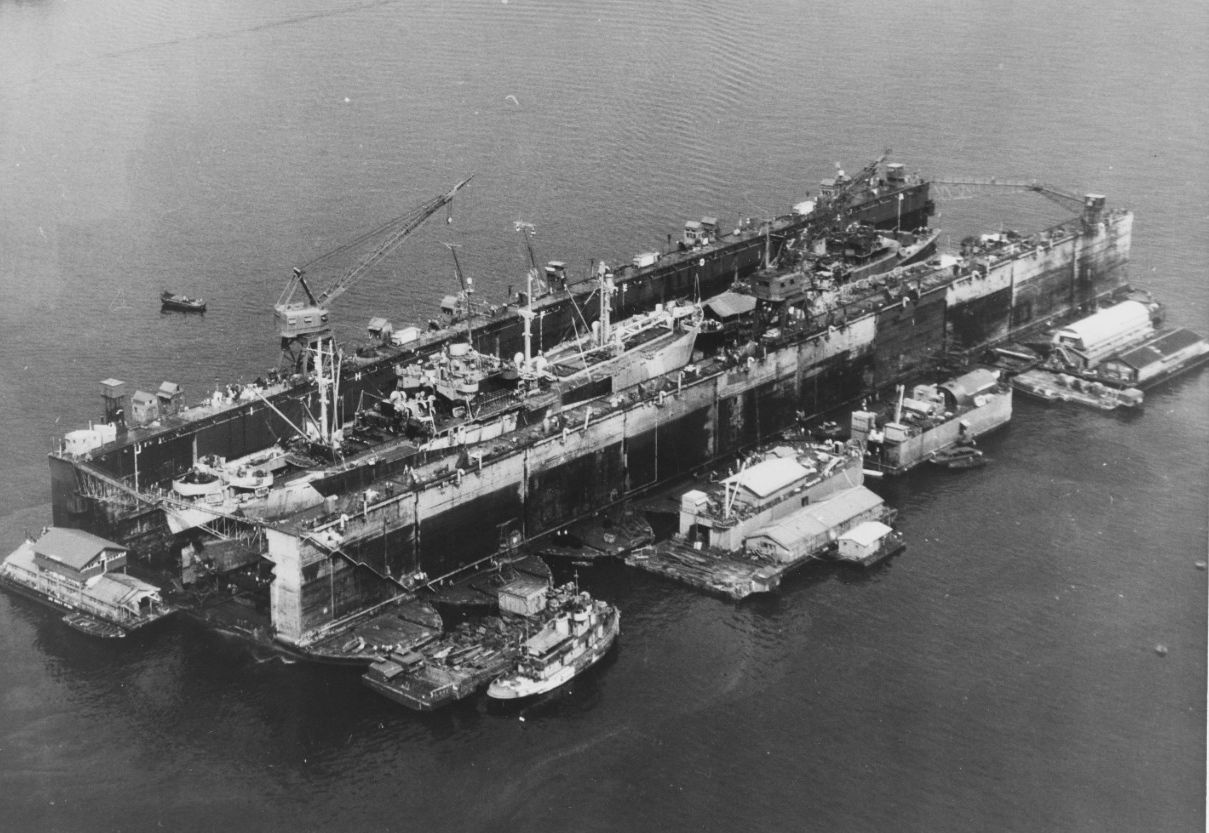
US Navy floating Dry Dock Number 4 in Seeadler Harbor 1945, surrounded by floating barges with workshops and a tugboat, repairing seaplane tender and Navy Liberty ship

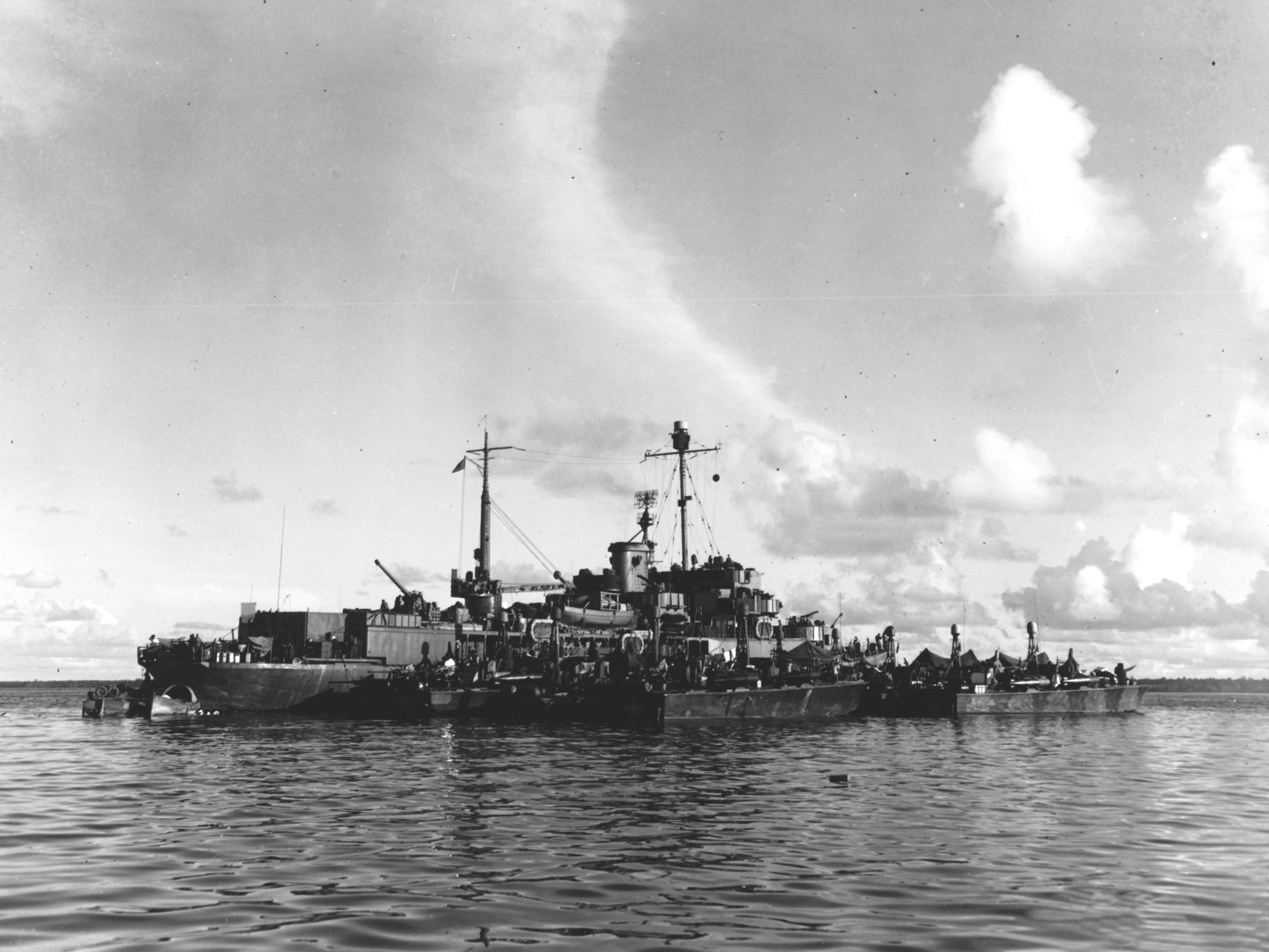
USS Oyster Bay tending PT boats in Seeadler Harbor on March 25, 1944

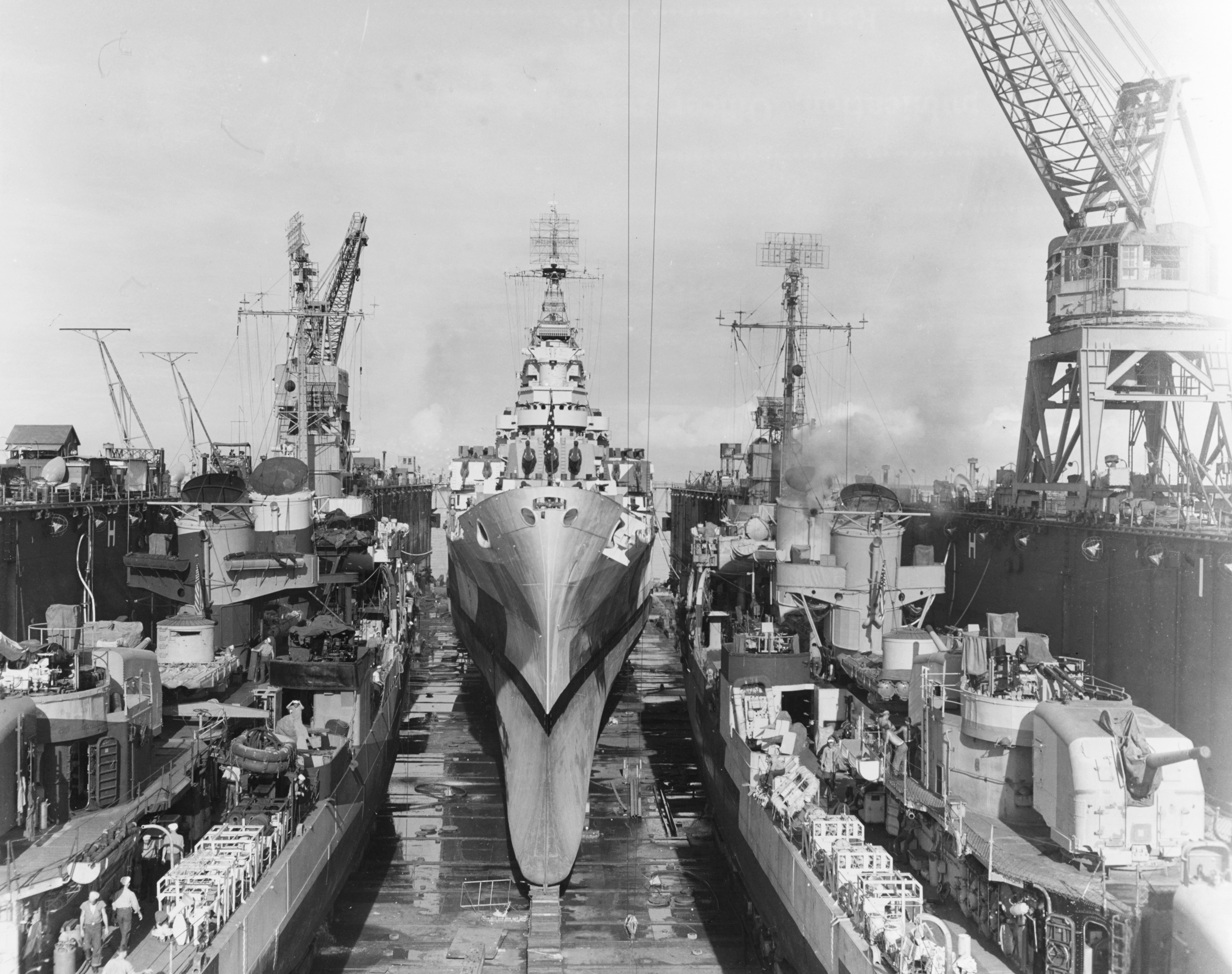
USS Claxton, Canberra and Killen in floating dry dock ABSD-2 on December 2, 1944

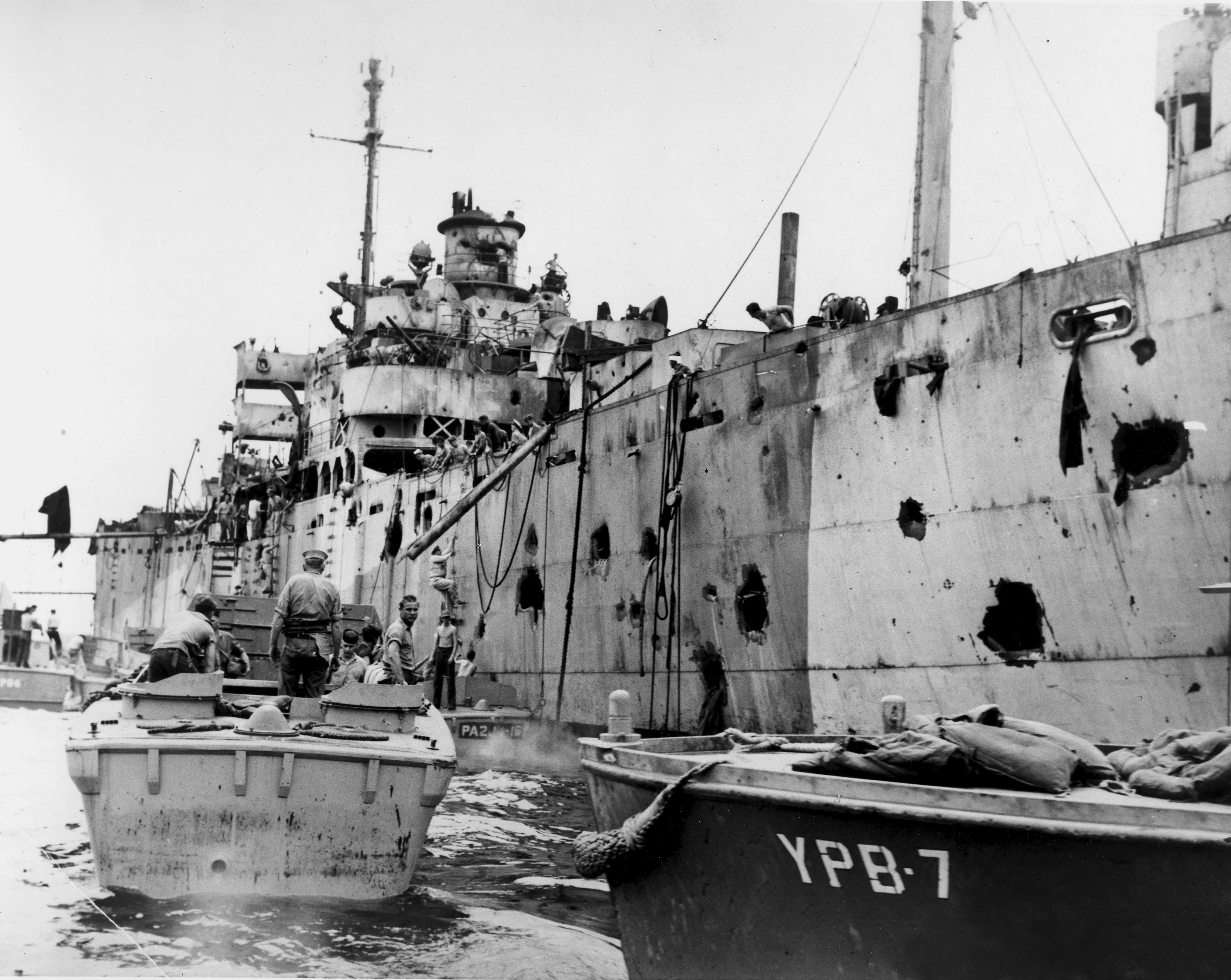
Mindanao damaged by the explosion of Mount Hood in Seeadler Harbor on November 10, 1944
