= USS ABSD-4 =

Large auxiliary floating drydock of the US Navy

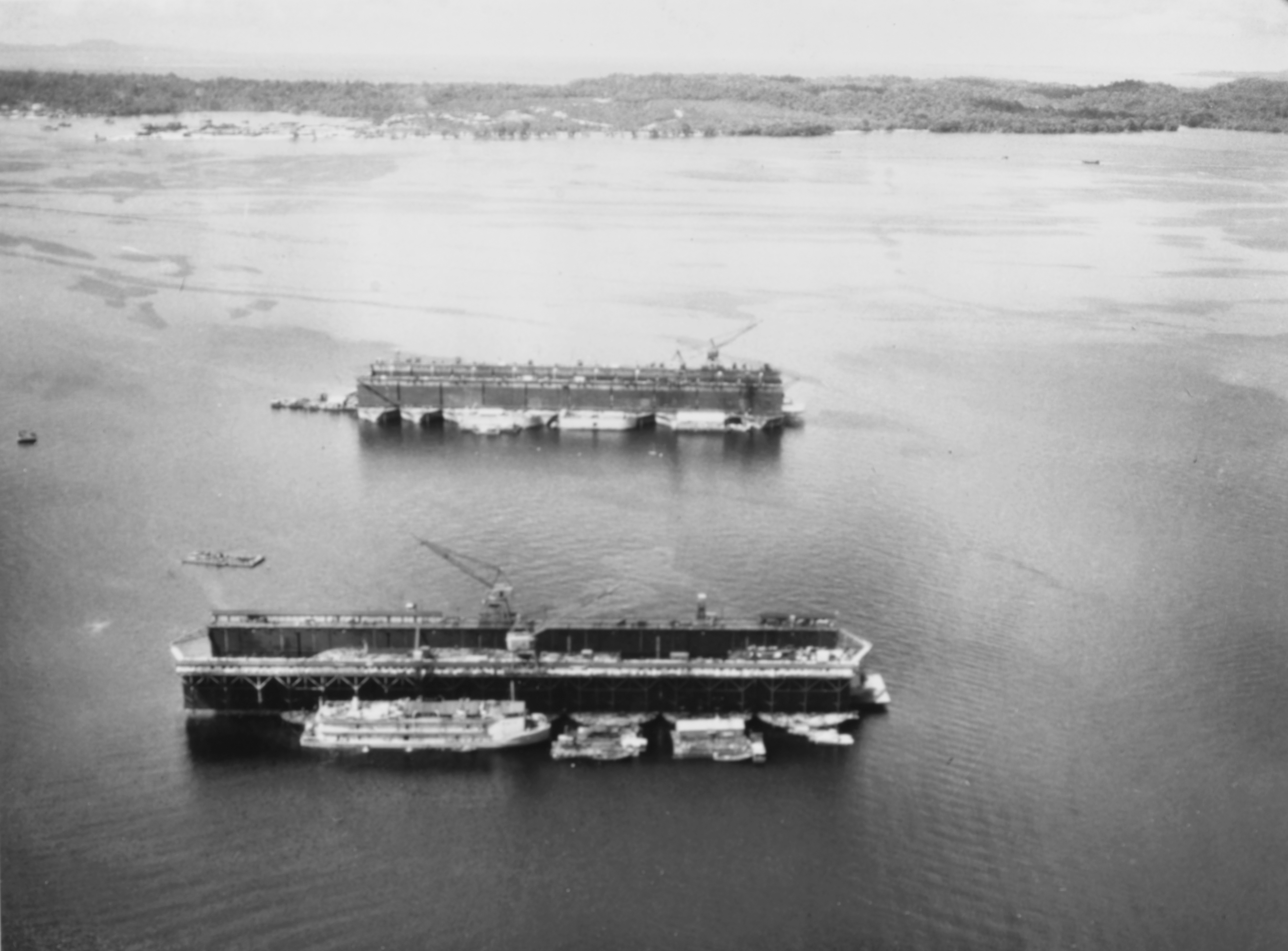
- ABSD-4 background in Seeadler Harbor with ABSD-2 (foreground) in September 1945

History

United States
- Name: USS AFDB-4 - ABSD-4
- Owner: US Navy
- Builder: Mare Island Naval Shipyard in Vallejo, California
- Laid down: 1942 and 1943
- Completed: 1944
- Recommissioned: 1946 to AFDB-4
- Out of service: 30 April 1945
- Stricken: 15 April 1989
- Honors and awards: American Campaign Medal Asiatic-Pacific Campaign Medal World War II Victory Medal National Defense Service Medal
- Fate: Partly sunk in place at Lombrum Naval Base

General characteristics
- Displacement: 38,500 (in ten sections)
- Length: 927 ft (283 m) (in ten sections)
- Beam: 256 ft 0 in (78.03 m)
- Height: 9 ft (2.7 m) floated, 78 ft (24 m) flooded
- Propulsion: none
- Capacity: 90,000 tons lift
- Complement: 690 officers and men
- Armament: none

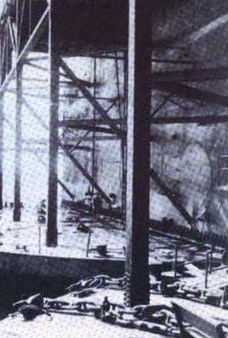
USS ABSD-4 ballast pontoons and moor chains at Seeadler Harbor at Admiralty Islands

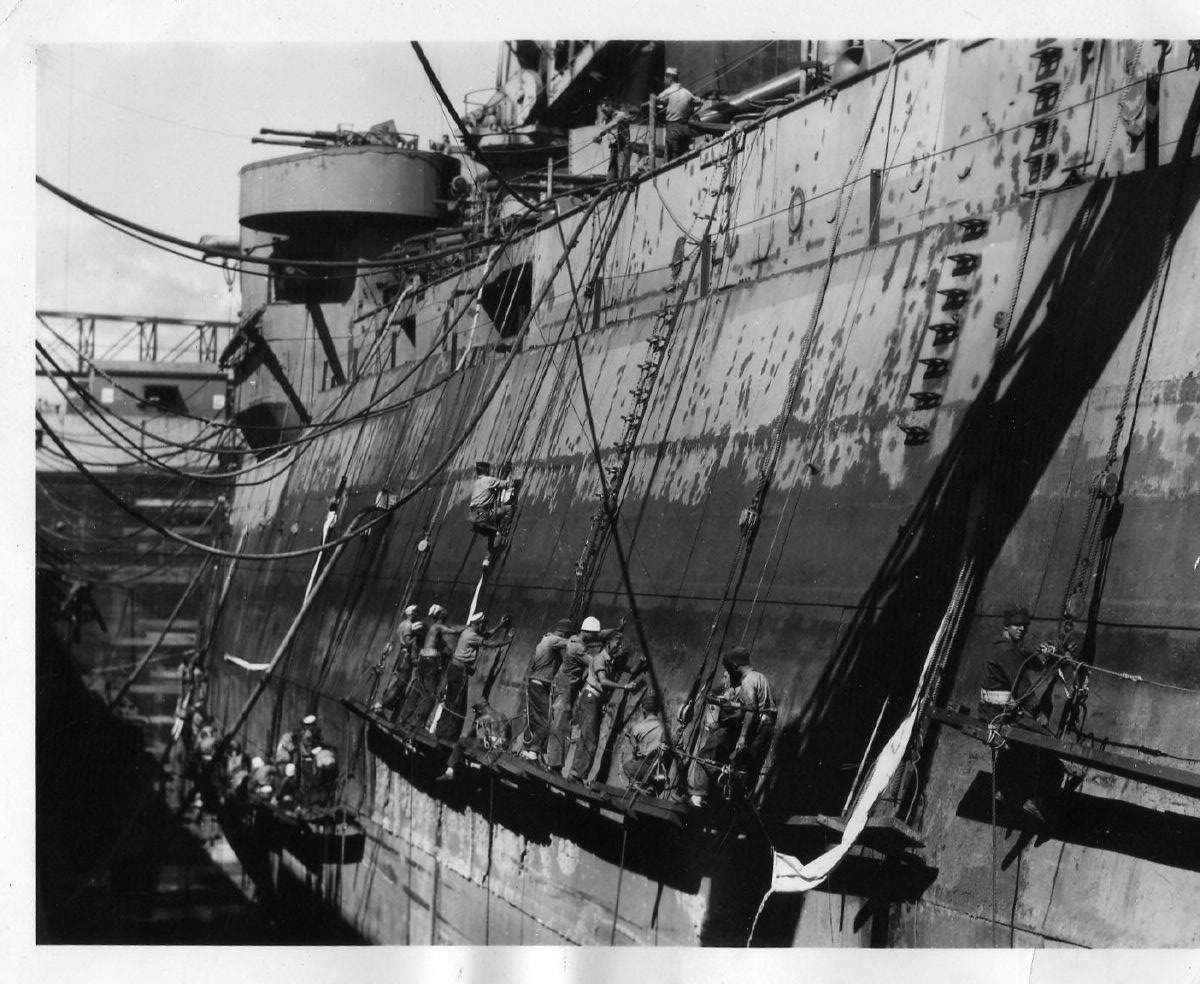
USS New York (BB-34) repaired ABSD-4 in March 1945. New York here is cleaned and painted

USS ABSD-4, later redesignated as AFDB-4, was a nine-section, non-self-propelled, large auxiliary floating drydock of the US Navy. Advance Base Sectional Dock-4 (Auxiliary Floating Dock Big-4) was constructed in sections during 1942 and 1943 by the Mare Island Naval Shipyard in Vallejo, California for World War II. With all ten sections joined, she was 927 feet long, 28 feet tall (keel to welldeck), and with an inside clear width of 133 feet 7 inches. ABSD-4 had a traveling 15-ton capacity crane with an 85-foot radius and two or more support barges. The two side walls were folded down under tow to reduce wind resistance and lower the center of gravity. ABSD-4 had 6 capstans for pulling, each rated at 24,000 lbf (110,000 N) at 30 ft/min (0.15 m/s), 4 of the capstans were reversible. There were also 4 ballast compartments in each section.

== World War II ==
The ABSD-4 floating drydock departed California in 1944 and made the voyage across the Pacific Ocean in convoys in 48 days. USS ABSD-4 sections were reassembled at Espiritu Santo Naval Base at Espiritu Santo, New Hebrides (now Vanuatu), in the South Pacific Ocean. Once assembled in the fall of 1944 she was moved for operation at Seeadler Harbor (also called Port Seeadler), at Admiralty Islands in the Bismarck Archipelago, to the north of New Guinea also called the Manus Islands, after the largest island there, at Manus Naval Base. USS ABSD-4 sister ship USS ABSD-2 also worked at Seeadler Harbor during the war. ABSD-4 repaired the large ships in the US Navy and United Kingdom's Royal Navy during World War II. Able to lift 90,000 tons ABSD-2 could raise large ships like, aircraft carriers, battleships, cruisers, and large auxiliary ships, out the water for repair below the ship's waterline. She was also used to repair multiple smaller ships at the same time. Ships in continuous use during war need repair both from wear and from war damage from naval mine and torpedoes. Rudders and propellers are best serviced on dry docks. Without ABSD-4 and her sister ships, at remote locations months could be lost in a ships returning to a home port for repair. ABSD-4 had provisions for the repair crew, such bunk beds, meals, and laundry. ABSD-4 had power stations, ballast pumps, repair shops, machine shops, and mess halls to be self-sustaining. ABSD-2 had two rail track moveable cranes able to lift tons of material and parts for removing damage parts and install new parts.

Some of the ships repaired:

- USS Duluth (CL-87) repaired storm damaged on 10 June 1945 completed repairs 5 July, back in service.
- USS New York (BB-34) repaired early March 1945, repaired propellers and repainted. Due to the USS New York 29 ft 7 in (9.02 m) draft with a full load, the battleship had to unload much of her ammunition and fuel oil before entering AFDB-4.
- USS Allen M. Sumner (DD-69) repaired on 20 Jan. 1945

== Attacked ==
Near the end of the war on April 22, 1945, at 2pm a Mitsubishi A6M Zero two seater plane piloted by Shimbo and Ensign Chuhei Okubo in the second seat, overflew Seeadler Harbor at 14,000 feet. They saw what they thought were two "aircraft carriers", but here actually empty floating dry docks ABSD-4 and ABSD-2. On April 27, 1945, at about 11:15pm a three Nakajima B5N a Japanese Zero fighter aircraft of the Imperial Japanese Navy flying from Truk flew over ABSD-4, one plane dropped an aerial torpedo and it hit one of the pontoons tanks of ABSD-4 damaging the dry dock. At the time of the attacked ABSD-4 was repairing a cargo ship, Landing Ship, Tank (LST) ship and a seaplane tender ship. The seaplane tender was loaded with ammunition and under an emergency repair. She was repaired and returned to service. On the same day shortly after ABSD-4 was hit, ABSD-2 was hit by an aerial torpedo into pontoon tank in section G, damaging the dry dock. ABSD-2 was repaired and returned to service.

== Post-war ==
After the war ABSD-4 was reclassified AFDB-4 and was taken out of service. ABSD-4 was left in Seeadler Harbor off Lombrum Point at Lombrum Naval Base. ABSD-4 was officially decommissioned and struck from the US Navy register on 15 April 1989. ABSD-4 is now a shipwreck that is partially sunk. The outer walls of the ABSD-4 remain above the water line. She rest at Lombrum, Papua New Guinea, GPS coordinates: 2.043333°S 147.406667°E.

== See also ==
- Dry dock
- Heavy-lift ship
- Hughes Mining Barge
- PD-50 Russia's largest floating dry dock.
- Semi-submersible naval vessel
- Semi-submersible platform
