= USS Mount Hood (AE-11) =

US Navy ammunition ship

Coordinates: 2.02833°S 147.355°E

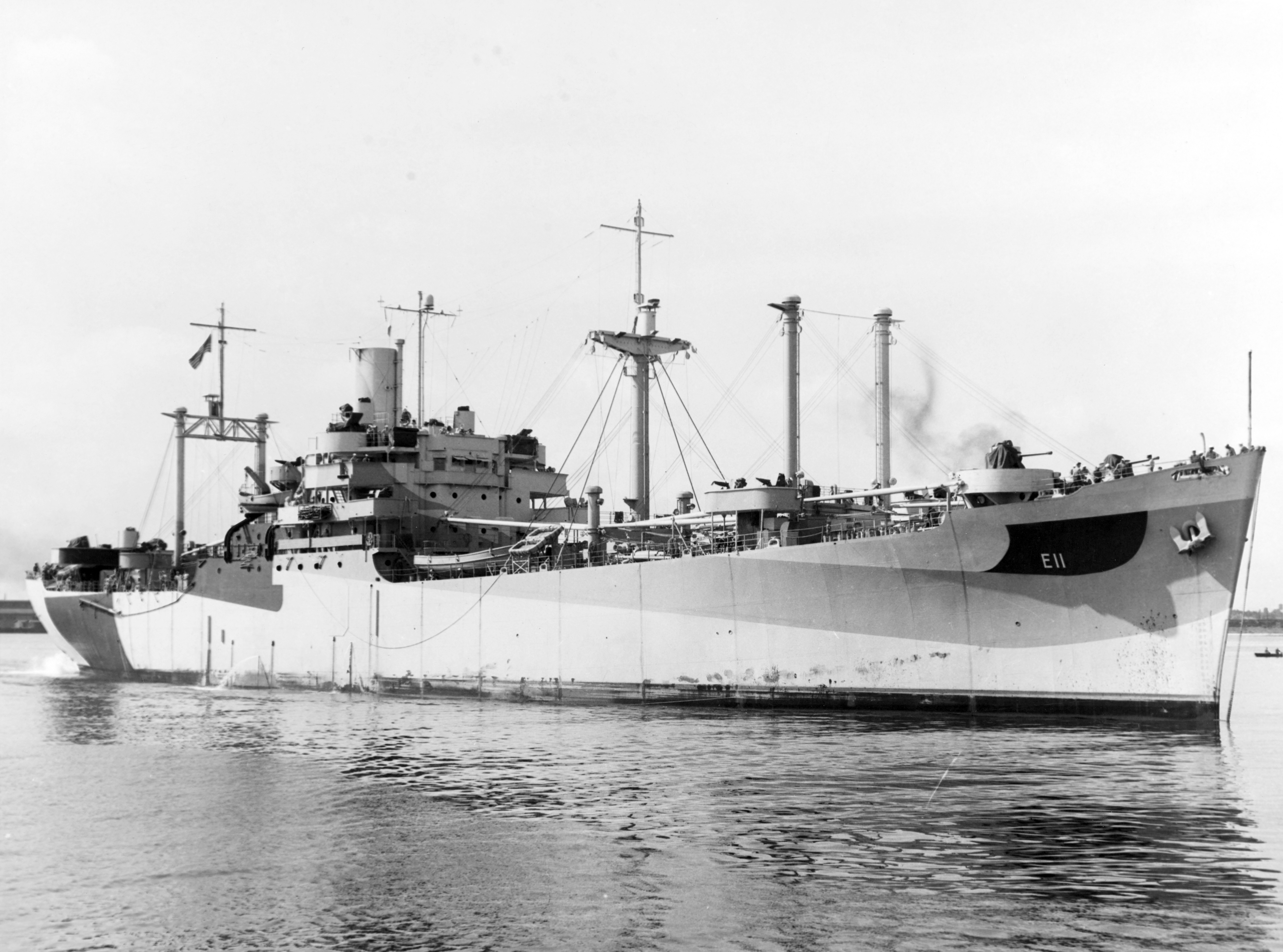

History

United States
- Name: USS Mount Hood (AE-11)
- Namesake: Mount Hood
- Builder: North Carolina Shipbuilding Co.; Wilmington, North Carolina
- Laid down: 28 September 1943 as SS Marco Polo
- Launched: 28 November 1943
- Sponsored by: Mrs. A. J. Reynolds
- Acquired: 28 January 1944
- Commissioned: 1 July 1944
- Stricken: 11 December 1944
- Fate: Exploded on 10 November 1944

General characteristics
- Class & type: Mount Hood-class ammunition ship (Type C2-S-AJ1)
- Displacement: 13,910 long tons (14,130 t)
- Length: 459 ft 2 in (140 m)
- Beam: 63 ft (19.2 m)
- Draft: 28 ft 3 in (8.6 m)
- Propulsion: Geared turbine; 1 × shaft; 6,000 shp (4.5 MW)
- Speed: 16 knots (30 km/h)
- Capacity: 7,700 long tons (7,800 t) deadweight
- Complement: 267 officers and enlisted
- Armament: 1 × 5"/38 caliber dual-purpose gun; 4 × 3"/50 caliber dual purpose guns; 4 × 40 mm AA guns (2x2); 10 × 20 mm AA gun mounts

USS Mount Hood (AE-11) was the lead ship of her class of ammunition ships for the United States Navy in World War II. She was the first ship named after Mount Hood, a volcano in the Cascade Range in the US state of Oregon. On 10 November 1944, shortly after 18 men had departed for shore leave, the rest of the crew were killed when the ship exploded in Seeadler Harbor at Manus Island in Papua New Guinea. The ship was obliterated while also sinking or severely damaging 22 smaller craft nearby.

== Service history ==
The Hood was built as Marco Polo, a cargo ship constructed under a US Maritime Commission contract (as MC hull 1356), by the North Carolina Shipbuilding Co., Wilmington, North Carolina.

The ship was renamed Mount Hood on 10 November 1943; launched on 28 November 1943; sponsored by Mrs. A. J. Reynolds; acquired by the Navy on a loan-charter basis on 28 January 1944; converted by the Norfolk Shipbuilding & Dry Dock Co., Norfolk, Virginia, and the Norfolk Navy Yard; and commissioned on 1 July 1944.

Following an abbreviated fitting out and shakedown period in the Chesapeake Bay area, ammunition ship Mount Hood reported for duty to ComServFor, Atlantic Fleet, on 5 August 1944. Assigned to carry cargo to the Pacific, she put into Norfolk, where her holds were loaded. On 21 August, as a unit of Task Group 29.6, she transited the Panama Canal on the 27th, and continued on, independently, via Finschafen, New Guinea. Mount Hood arrived at Seeadler Harbor, in Manus Island of the Admiralty Islands, on 22 September. Assigned to ComSoWesPac, she commenced dispensing ammunition and explosives to ships preparing for the Philippine offensive.

=== Disaster ===
On 10 November, the ship was lying in Berth 380, in the central part of the harbor near the harbor entrance, instead of being moored well away from the main anchorage. This was done for reasons of convenience, as it afforded her calmer water, shortened the boating distances for ammunition transfer, and allowed cruisers to come directly alongside her for munitioning. She was loaded with an assortment of munitions, including 100 and 250 lb (45 and 113 kg) bombs, 5, 6, 8, and 14 in (13, 15, 20, and 36 cm) shells and powder charges, .30 cal., .50 cal machine-gun and 20 mm cannon cartridges, aerial depth charges, and rocket projectiles and motors for a total of approximately 3,800 tons of ammunition. The ship was surrounded by small craft, including several medium-sized LCM landing craft. All five of her hatches were open, and 500 lb bombs were being loaded into #3 Hold. At 08:30 hours on 10 November 1944, a party consisting of communications officer, Lt. Lester H. Wallace, and 17 men left the ship and headed for shore to collect the ship's mail. At 08:55, while this party was walking on the beach, the ship exploded. Even at a distance of 4,600 yards (4,200 m) from the ship, the force of the explosion knocked Wallace and most of his men from their feet. Scrambling back into their boat, they headed back to the ship, only to turn around again shortly thereafter as "There was nothing but debris all around...".

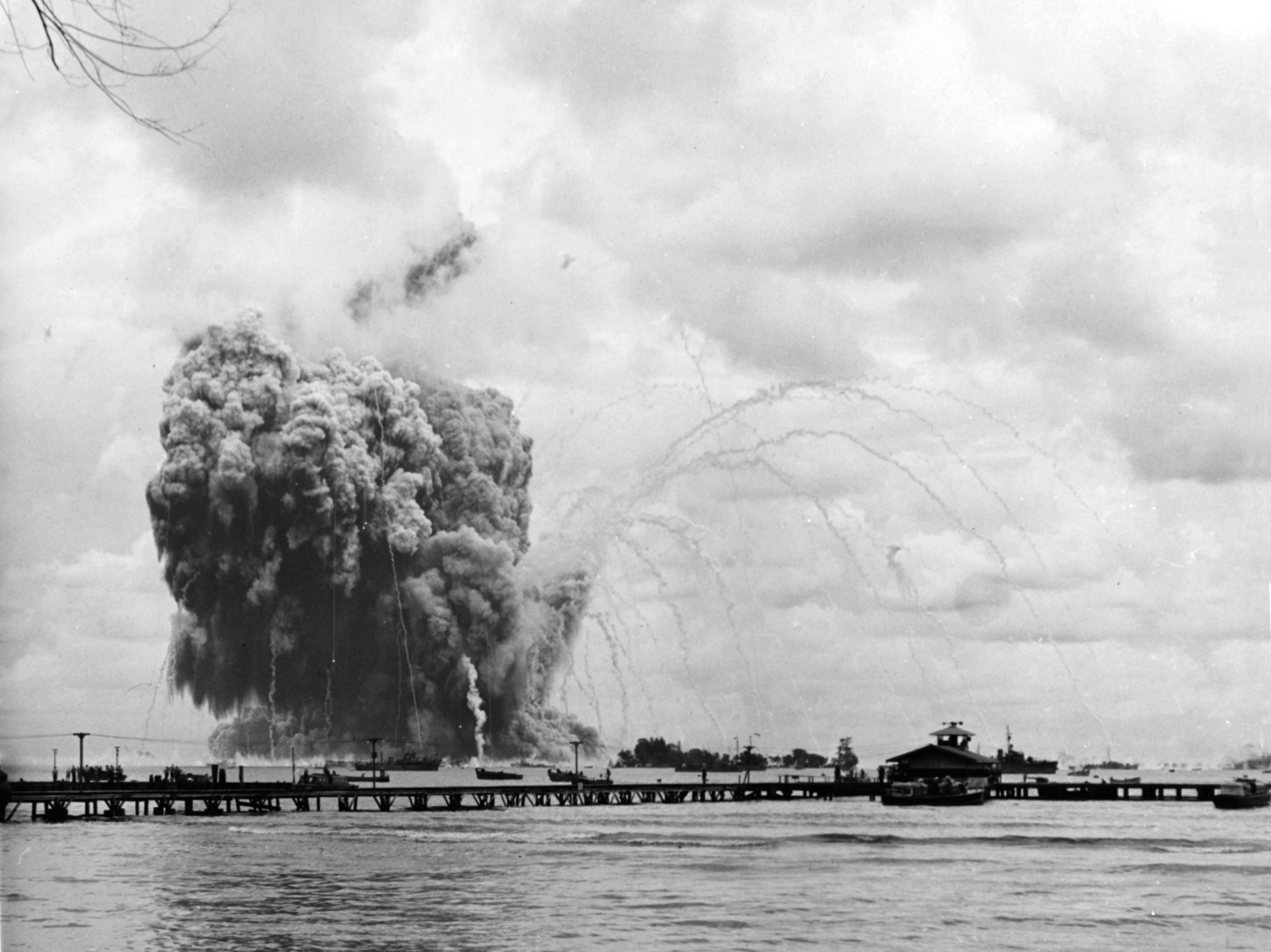
Mount Hood explodes: the smoke trails are left by fragments ejected by the explosion.

Mount Hood had been anchored in about 114 feet (35 m) of water. The initial explosion caused flame and smoke to shoot up from amidships to more than masthead height. Within seconds, the bulk of her cargo detonated with a more intense explosion. Mushrooming smoke rose to 7,000 ft (2,100 m), obscuring the ship and the surrounding area for a radius of approximately 500 yd (460 m). Mount Hood's former position was revealed by a trench in the ocean floor 300 ft (91 m) long, 50 ft (15 m) wide, and 30–40 ft (9–12 m) deep. The largest remaining piece of the hull was found in the trench and measured no bigger than 16 by 10 ft (5 by 3 m). No other remains of Mount Hood were found except fragments of metal which had struck other ships in the harbor and a few tattered pages of a signal notebook found floating in the water several hundred yards away. No human remains were recovered of the 350 men aboard Mount Hood or small boats loading alongside at the time of the explosion. The only survivors from the Mount Hood crew were Lt. Wallace and the 17 enlisted men who had left the ship a short time before the explosion. Two of the crew were being transferred to the base brig for trial by court martial, and the remainder of the party were visiting the base chaplain or picking up mail at the base post office. Charges against the prisoners were dropped following the explosion.

The concussion and metal fragments hurled from the ship caused casualties and damage to other ships and small craft within 2,000 yd (1,800 m). The repair ship Mindanao, which was broadside-on to the blast, was the most seriously damaged. All personnel topside on Mindanao were killed outright (including a crewman from Mount Hood who had been working on Mindanao at the time of the explosion—he was the only one of Mount Hood's deceased crew members who was positively identified). Dozens more men were killed or wounded below decks as numerous heavy fragments from Mount Hood penetrated the side plating. Eighty-two of Mindanao's crew died. 22 small boats and landing craft were sunk, destroyed, or damaged beyond repair, while damage to other vessels required more than 100,000 man-hours to repair; a further 371 sailors from ships in the harbor were injured.

=== Inquiry ===
A board convened to examine evidence relating to the disaster was unable to ascertain the exact cause. However, the official Navy report noted that the vessel had a "relatively inexperienced crew," with a "lack of leadership among the officers, and lack of discipline among the crew," as well as "a general lack of posting safety regulations for handling ammunition, and instruction of the crew therein." As a result, the report noted, this lack of training "was reflected in rough and careless handling of ammunition and lack of enforcing prohibition of smoking in boats alongside the U.S.S. Mount Hood. The stowage condition of boosters, fuzes and detonators in number one hold was dangerous. In holds numbers two and three there were stowed broken rocket bodies from which some of the powder had spilled." The report further noted that "Pyrotechnics and napalm were stowed in an open temporary wood and tar paper hut on deck under hazardous conditions near the hatch to number four hold." This was also near the most likely source of the accident, as the initial explosion occurred "amidships near number three or four hold." The report concluded that "the most likely cause of the explosion was careless handling of ammunition" aboard the ship.

After only a little over four months' service, Mount Hood was struck from the Naval Register on 11 December 1944.

== List of ships damaged ==
The following ships were damaged by the explosion of Mount Hood:

- Abarenda (IX-131)
- Alhena (AKA-9)
- Argonne (AG-31)
- Aries (AK-51)
- Cacapon (AO-52)
- Cebu (ARG-6)
- Kyne (DE-744)
- Lyman (DE-302)
- Mindanao (ARG-3)
- Oberrender (DE-344)
- Petrof Bay (CVE-80)
- Piedmont (AD-17)
- Potawatomi (ATF-109)
- Preserver (ARS-8)
- Saginaw Bay (CVE-82)
- Talbot (APD-7)
- Walter C. Wann (DE-412)
- Young (DD-580)
- YF-681
- YMS-1
- YMS-140
- YMS-238
- YMS-243
- YMS-286
- YMS-293
- YMS-319
- YMS-335
- YMS-340
- YMS-341
- YMS-342
- YMS-39
- YMS-49
- YMS-52
- YMS-71
- YMS-81
- YO-77

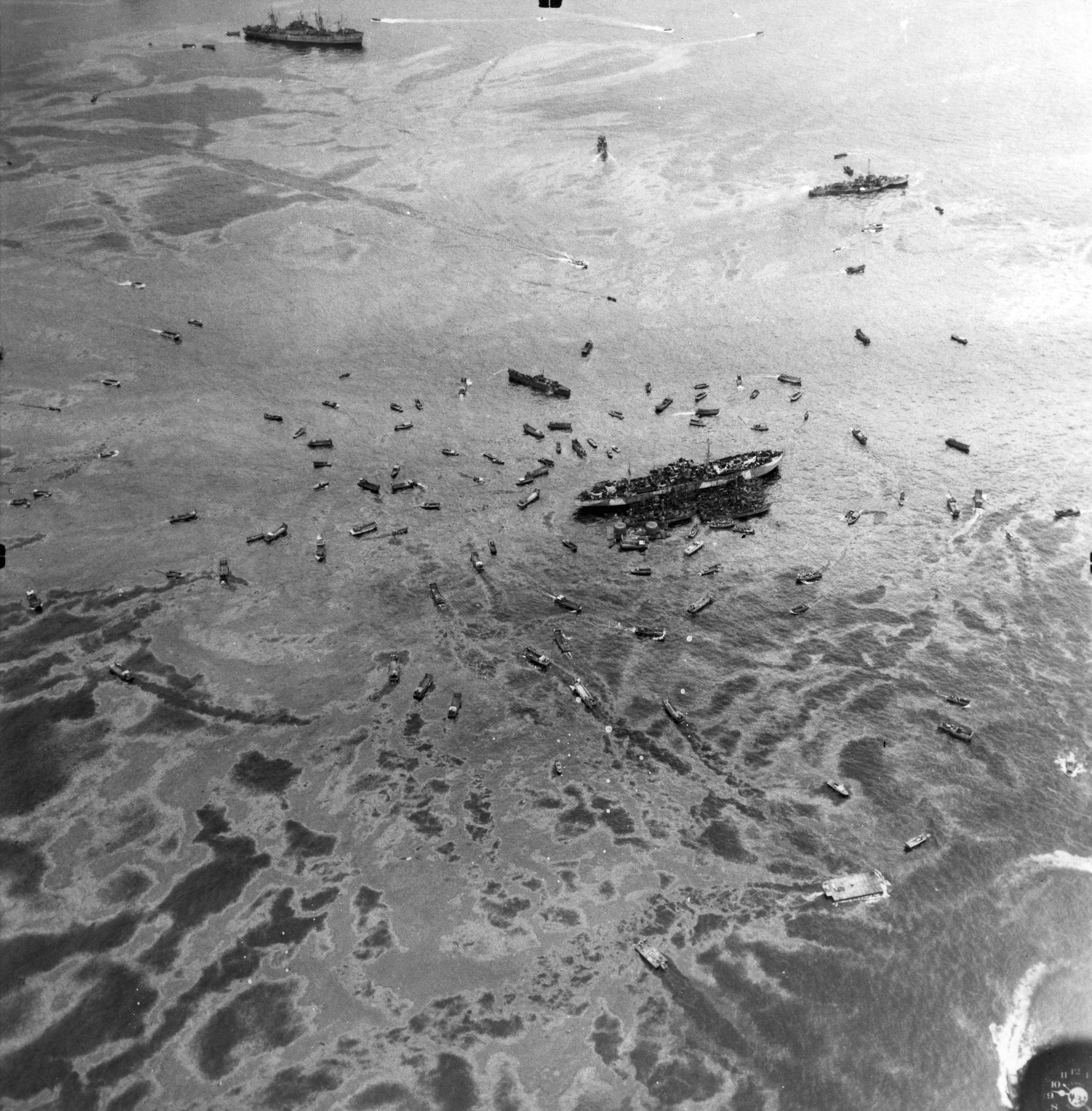
Explosion of Mount Hood in Seeadler Harbor, Manus, Admiralty Islands, 10 November 1944. Small craft gathered around Mindanao during salvage and rescue efforts shortly after Mount Hood blew up about 350 yards (320 m) away from Mindanao's port side. Mindanao, and seven motor minesweepers (YMS) moored to her starboard side, were damaged by the blast, as were the Alhena (in the photo's top left center) and Oberrender, (top right). Note the extensive oil slick, with tracks through it made by small craft.

In addition to the above ships, nine medium landing craft (LCM) and a pontoon barge moored alongside Mount Hood were also destroyed, and 13 small boats or landing craft were sunk or damaged beyond repair.

== See also ==
- West Loch disaster
- USS Serpens (AK-97)
- Port Chicago disaster
- List of accidents and incidents involving transport or storage of ammunition
