= USS Mindanao (ARG-3) =

US Navy Luzon-class internal combustion engine repair ship in service 1943-1947

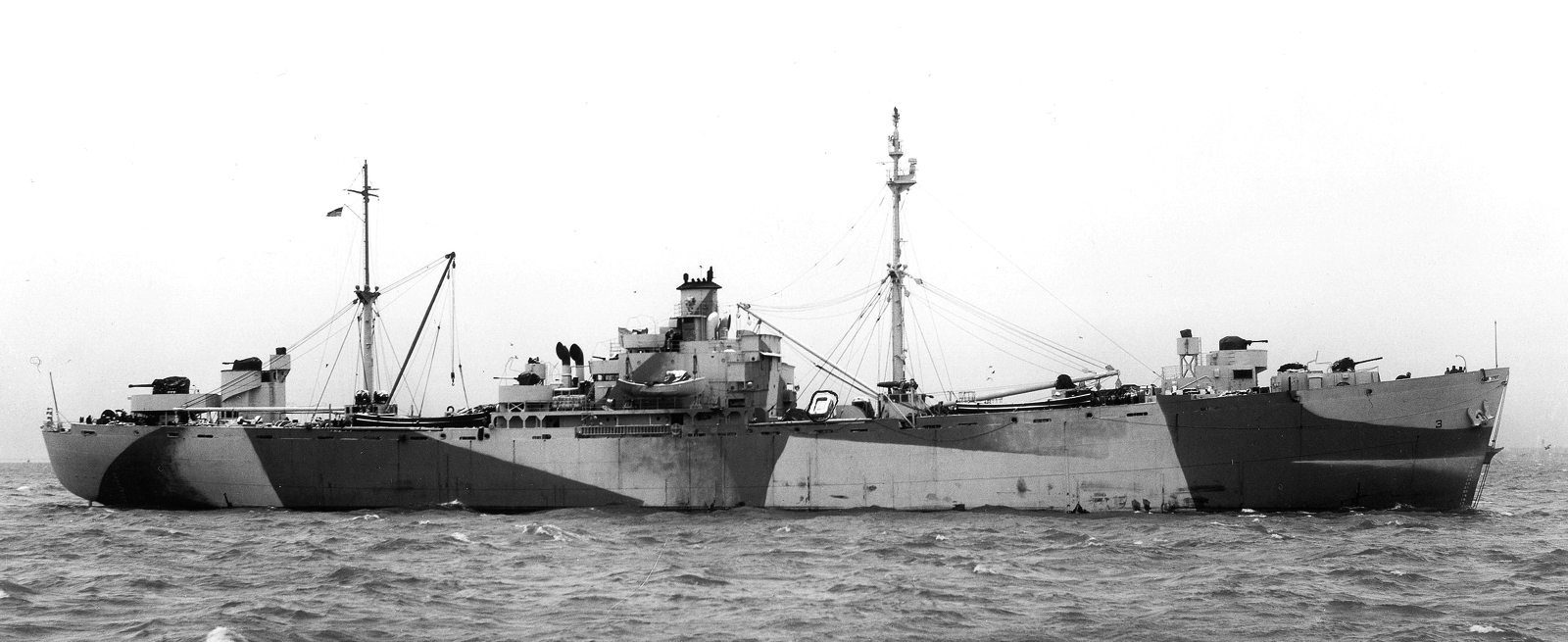
- USS Mindanao on 16 December 1943

History

United States
- Name: Elbert Hubbard; Mindanao
- Namesake: Elbert Hubbard; Mindanao
- Ordered: as a Type EC2-S-C1 hull, MCE hull 983
- Builder: Bethlehem-Fairfield Shipyard, Baltimore, Maryland
- Yard number: 2133
- Laid down: 11 April 1943
- Launched: 13 May 1943
- Acquired: 20 May 1943
- Commissioned: 6 November 1943
- Decommissioned: 17 May 1947
- Stricken: 1 September 1961
- Identification: Hull symbol: ARG-2; Code letters: NPYG
- Fate: Laid up in National Defense Reserve Fleet, Beaumont, Texas, 9 May 1961; Laid up in National Defense Reserve Fleet, James River, Lee Hall, Virginia, 28 September 1976; Reefed 11 November 1980

General characteristics
- Class & type: Luzon-class Internal Combustion Engine Repair Ship
- Type: Type EC2-S-C1
- Displacement: 4,023 long tons (4,088 t) (light load); 14,350 long tons (14,580 t) (full load)
- Length: 441 ft 6 in (134.57 m)
- Beam: 56 ft 11 in (17.35 m)
- Draft: 23 ft (7.0 m)
- Installed power: 2 × Babcock & Wilcox header-type boilers, 220 psi (1,500 kPa) 450 °F (232 °C); 2,500 shp (1,900 kW)
- Propulsion: 1 × General Machine Corporation vertical triple expansion engines; 1 x propeller
- Speed: 12.5 kn (23.2 km/h; 14.4 mph) (ship's trials)
- Complement: 31 officers, 552 enlisted
- Armament: 1 × 5 in (127 mm)/38 caliber dual purpose (DP) gun; 1 × 3 in (76 mm)/50 caliber (DP) gun; 2 × twin 40 mm (1.6 in) Bofors anti-aircraft (AA) gun mounts; 12 × single 20 mm (0.8 in) Oerlikon cannons AA mounts

USS Mindanao (ARG-3) was a Luzon-class internal combustion engine repair ship in service with the United States Navy from 1943 to 1947. She was sunk as an artificial reef in 1980.

== History ==
=== Construction ===
Mindanao was named for the Island of Mindanao, second largest and southernmost island in the Philippines, it was the second U.S. Naval vessel to bear the name. She was laid down 11 April 1943, as the liberty ship SS Elbert Hubbard, under a Maritime Commission (MARCOM) contract, MCE hull 983, by the Bethlehem-Fairfield Shipyard, Inc., in Baltimore, Maryland; launched 13 May 1943; sponsored by Mrs. C. R. Spalding; acquired by the Navy on 20 May 1943; and commissioned as Mindanao on 6 November 1943.

=== Pacific Theater of Operations ===
After shakedown in Chesapeake Bay, Mindanao joined Task Group 29.7 (TG 29.7) on 20 December 1943, and sailed for Cuba, the Panama Canal, and Nouméa, New Caledonia, arriving 27 January 1944, to report for duty with Service Squadron South Pacific. The repair ship immediately found herself with more than enough work. On 25 February, she sailed to continue her vital task at Espiritu Santo, and in September she arrived at Manus to serve the forces staging for the Philippine campaign.

==== Mount Hood explosion ====
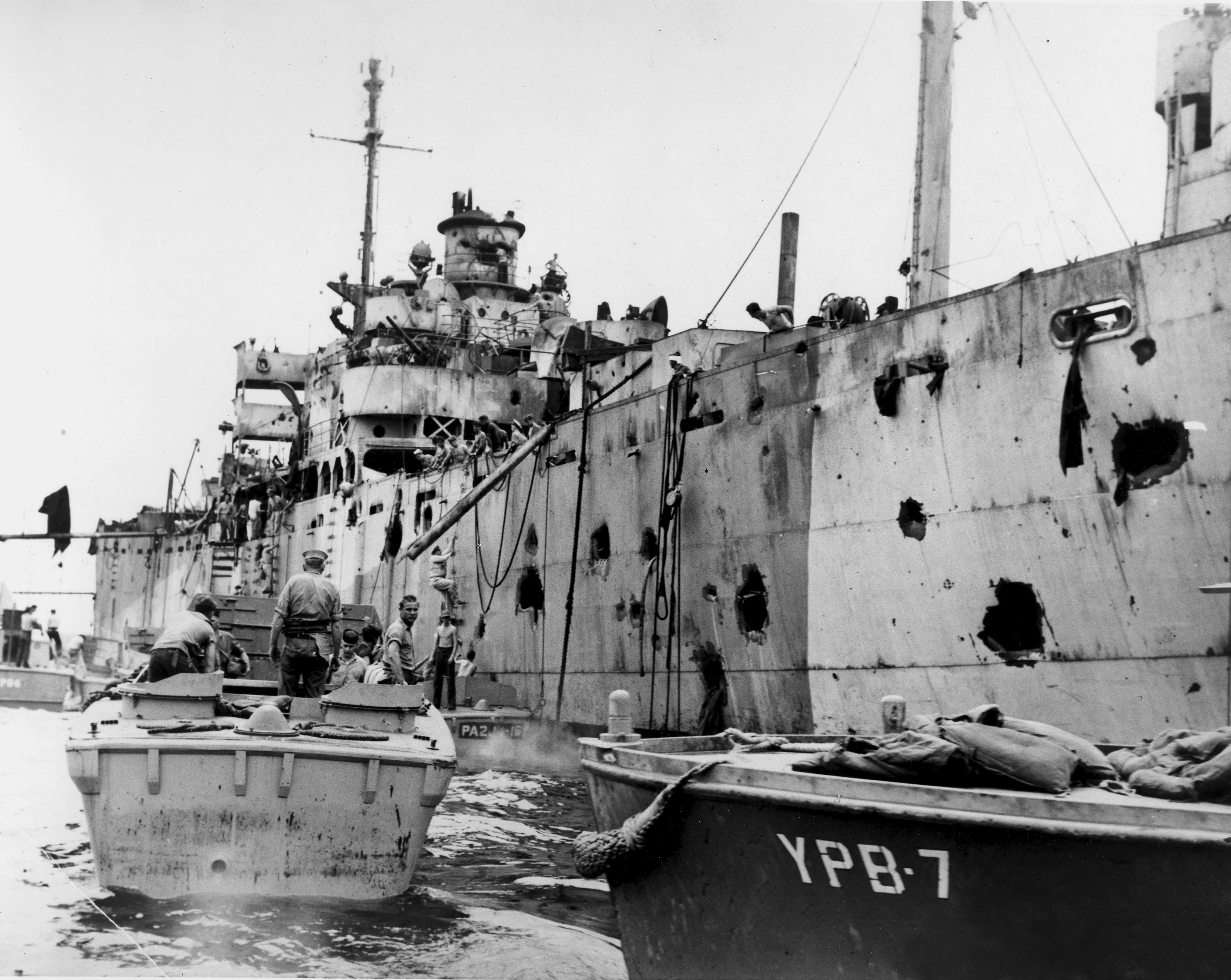
Salvage and rescue work underway on Mindanao shortly after Mount Hood blew up about 350 yd (320 m) away. Note the heavy damage to Mindanao's hull and superstructure, including large holes from fragment impacts. View looks forward from alongside her port quarter. Mindanao had 180 crewmen killed and injured by this explosion. She was under repair until 21 December 1944. Small craft alongside or nearby include (from left) YPB-6 (probable identification), two LCVPs and YPB-7.

Now with TG 30.9, she was anchored in Seeadler Harbor on the morning of 10 November, when at about 08:50 the ammunition ship Mount Hood blew up. Mindanao, 350 yd (320 m) away, suffered extensive damage particularly to her superstructure, and aft. Of her crew, 82 were killed and 98 wounded. The survivors, with Seabees from shore, immediately began to aid the wounded and clear the debris, a job which took seven days. Repairs began on 18 November, performed by her own crew with aid again from Seabees, as well as men and equipment from Medusa. By 21 December, Mindanao was ready to resume her key function in repairing engines for other ships.

After a brief voyage to the Solomon Islands in February and March 1945, Mindanao arrived at Ulithi 27 March, to prepare ships for the Okinawa campaign. There she served until 9 October, when she sailed for periods of duty at Okinawa and Shanghai.

=== Decommissioning and fate ===
Her duty supporting the occupation forces complete, Mindanao got underway for home 26 March 1946. She called at San Pedro, Los Angeles; Balboa and Colón, in the Panama Canal Zone; New Orleans, Louisiana; and Galveston, Texas, before arriving Orange, Texas, on 12 July. She decommissioned there 17 May 1947, to join the Atlantic Reserve Fleet, and remained at Orange, even after being struck from the Naval Vessel Register and transferred to the Maritime Commission (MARCOM) in 1961. On 9 May 1961, she joined the National Defense Reserve Fleet at Beaumont, Texas, where she remained until 19 April 1976, when she was withdrawn by the Navy to have her equipment removed. On 28 September 1976, Mindanao entered the James River NDRF, Lee Hall, Virginia, until she was finally withdrawn 12 March 1980, to become part of Florida's artificial reef program.

On 11 November 1980, the ex-Mindanao was scuttled to form an artificial reef off Daytona Beach, Florida, in 85-foot-deep (26 m) water at 29°12.00′N 80°44.87′W, 11 mi (18 km) northeast of Ponce de León Inlet.

== Bibliography ==
=== Online resources ===
- "Mindanao II (ARG-3)". Dictionary of American Naval Fighting Ships. Naval History and Heritage Command. 10 August 2015. This article incorporates text from this source, which is in the public domain.
- "Bethlehem-Fairfield, Baltimore MD". ShipbuildingHistory.com. 14 August 2008.
- "USS Mindanao (ARG-3)". NavSource. 3 March 2017.
- "MINDANAO (ARG-3)". United States Department of Transportation. Archived from the original on 12 December 2019.
- "Artificial Reef Sites Information". Volusia County Reef Research Dive Team Inc. 17 April 2008.
