= USS Kyne =

Cannon-class destroyer escort

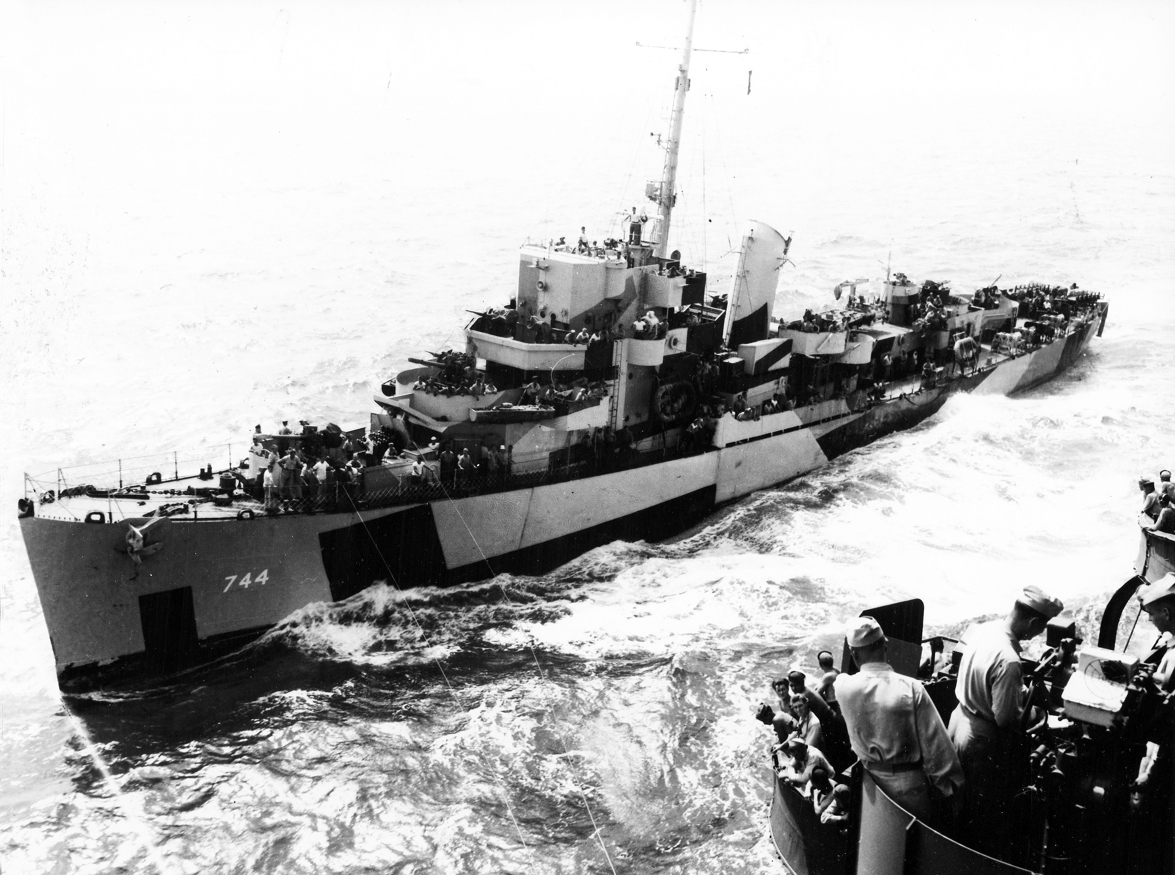

History

United States
- Name: USS Kyne
- Namesake: Elden Francis Kyne
- Builder: Western Pipe and Steel Company, Los Angeles, California
- Laid down: 16 April 1943
- Launched: 15 August 1943
- Commissioned: 4 April 1944
- Decommissioned: 14 June 1946
- Recommissioned: 21 November 1950
- Decommissioned: 17 June 1960
- Stricken: 1 August 1972
- Honors and awards: 6 battle stars (World War II)
- Fate: Sold for scrapping, 1 November 1973

General characteristics
- Class & type: Cannon-class destroyer escort
- Displacement: 1,240 long tons (1,260 t) standard; 1,620 long tons (1,646 t) full
- Length: 306 ft (93 m) o/a; 300 ft (91 m) w/l
- Beam: 36 ft 10 in (11.23 m)
- Draft: 11 ft 8 in (3.56 m)
- Propulsion: 4 × GM Mod. 16-278A diesel engines with electric drive, 6,000 shp (4,474 kW), 2 screws
- Speed: 21 knots (39 km/h; 24 mph)
- Range: 10,800 nmi (20,000 km) at 12 kn (22 km/h; 14 mph)
- Complement: 15 officers and 201 enlisted
- Armament: 3 × single Mk.22 3"/50 caliber guns; 1 × twin 40 mm Mk.1 AA gun; 8 × 20 mm Mk.4 AA guns; 3 × 21-inch (533 mm) torpedo tubes; 1 × Hedgehog Mk.10 anti-submarine mortar (144 rounds); 8 × Mk.6 depth charge projectors; 2 × Mk.9 depth charge tracks

USS Kyne (DE-744) was a Cannon-class destroyer escort built for the United States Navy during World War II. She served in the Pacific Ocean and provided escort service against submarine and air attack for Navy vessels and convoys. She earned six battle stars during the war.

She was named in honor of Elden Francis Kyne who was killed in action on 9 August 1942, when the heavy cruiser Astoria (CA-34) was sunk by Japanese naval forces during the Battle of Savo Island. Kyne was laid down on 16 April 1943, by the Western Pipe and Steel Company, Los Angeles, California; launched on 15 August 1943, sponsored by Mrs. Alma Marion Kyne, widow of Ens. Kyne; and commissioned on 4 April 1944.

== World War II Pacific Theatre operations ==
After shakedown along the U.S. West Coast, Kyne cleared Los Angeles, California, on 6 June 1944, to join the Pacific Fleet. Following training and escort duty at Pearl Harbor, Kyne was underway 12 August to screen a task force which brought material and ships for the impending Palau Islands invasion. She departed Manus on 15 September as escort to transports filled with garrison troops and supplies, landing at Peleliu on 20 September. Kyne sailed the same day as escort to a convoy carrying wounded Marines from the scene of battle.

For the next three months the destroyer escort continued screening operations out of Ulithi for a fleet logistic support unit which replenished both Task Force 38 and Task Force 58. She was damaged by the November 1944 USS Mount Hood (AE-11) explosion. Departing Ulithi on 2 January 1945, Kyne provided escort service for refueling operations in support of the Luzon landings on 6 January. She remained on station in the Philippines before returning Ulithi on 21 January to prepare for the Iwo Jima landings.

Operating together with support units, she departed Ulithi on 8 February to provide a screen for refueling operations during the Iwo Jima invasion. When that island was secure, giving the United States an air strip vitally needed as base for future B-29 raids on Japan, Kyne returned Ulithi on 5 March. Sailing again on 25 March as a screen to oilers, she made her way to Okinawa – the last step on the road to Japan. She continued screen and patrol operations for the support unit throughout most of the Okinawa campaign, returning to Ulithi on 21 May.

Kyne cleared San Pedro Bay, Philippine Islands, on 26 June to screen escort carriers as they provided air support for the invasion near Balikpapan, Borneo. Following the Borneo landings, she returned to the logistic support group during July as planes of the fleet rained fire on the Japanese home islands.

The full naval logbook of the Kyne from 4/4/44-11/30/45 is available online.

== End-of-War activity ==
Upon cessation of hostilities on 14 August and, after 43 days at sea, Kyne arrived at Tokyo Bay on 28 August as part of the occupation force. Departing Yokosuka, Japan, on 2 October, the destroyer escort arrived Philadelphia, Pennsylvania, on 23 November via Pearl Harbor and Long Beach, California. Kyne decommissioned at Green Cove Springs, Florida, on 14 June 1946.

== Post-War decommissioning ==
During 1947 Kyne was designated in service, in reserve, and operated as a reserve training ship out of Fort Schuyler, New York She recommissioned on 21 November 1950 and was assigned to the 3rd Naval District as a reserve training ship. For the next nine years, Kyne provided the training necessary to maintain a well-drilled reserve, ready to defend the nation during any crisis. Kyne decommissioned on 17 June 1960, at New York and she remained in the Atlantic Reserve Fleet at Philadelphia until she was sold for scrapping on 1 November 1973.

== Awards ==
Kyne received six battle stars for World War II service.
