= USS Young (DD-580) =

Fletcher-class destroyer

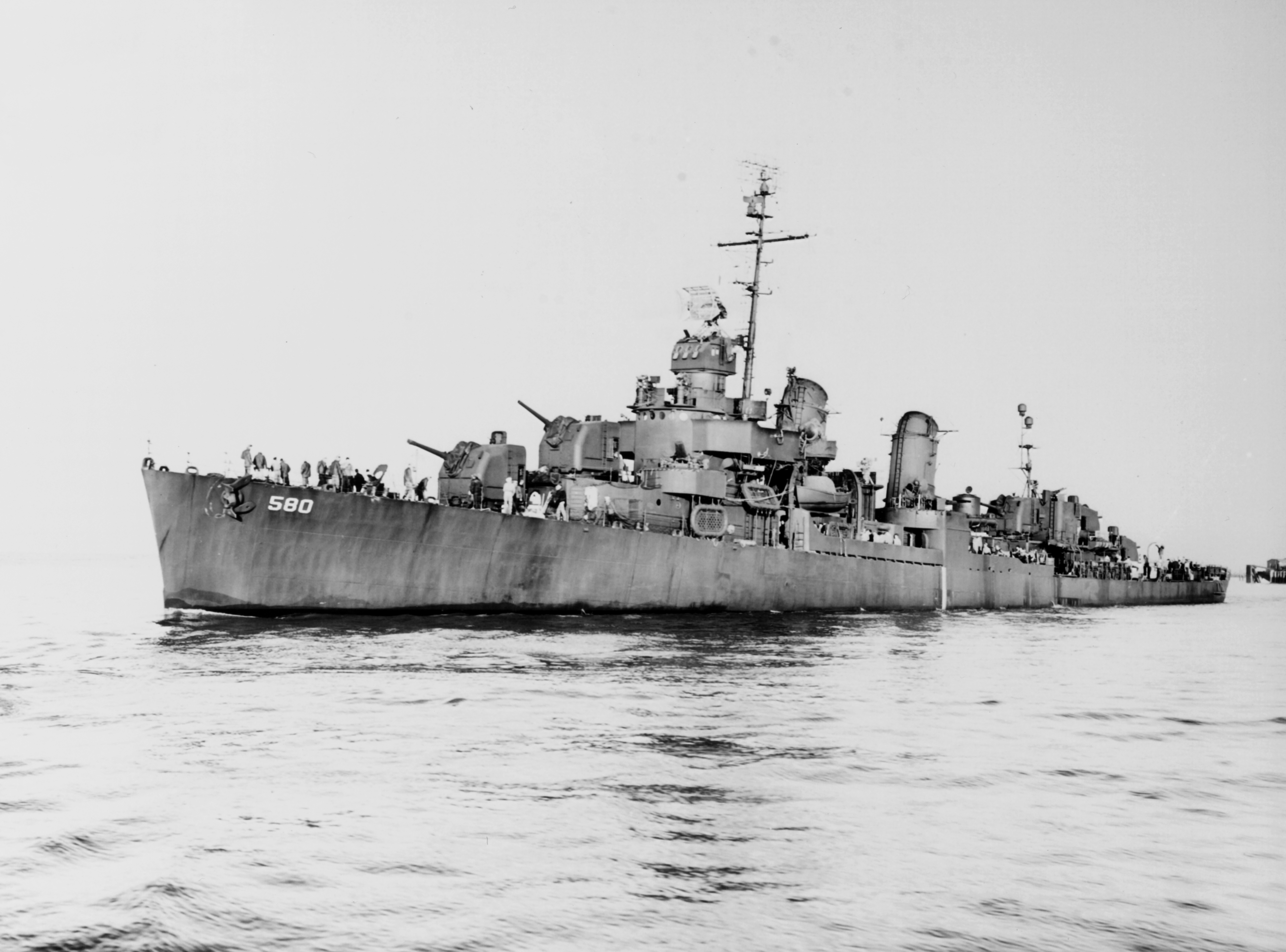
- USS Young (DD-580) off the Mare Island Navy Yard, California, 26 July 1945

History

United States
- Name: USS Young
- Namesake: Lucien Young
- Builder: Consolidated Steel Corporation
- Laid down: 7 May 1942
- Launched: 15 October 1942
- Commissioned: 31 July 1943
- Decommissioned: January 1947
- Stricken: 1 May 1968
- Fate: Sunk as a target, 6 March 1970

General characteristics
- Class & type: Fletcher-class destroyer
- Displacement: 2,050 tons
- Length: 376 ft 6 in (114.8 m)
- Beam: 39 ft 8 in (12.1 m)
- Draft: 17 ft 9 in (5.4 m)
- Propulsion: 60,000 shp (44,742 kW); 2 propellers
- Speed: 35 knots (65 km/h; 40 mph)
- Range: 6,500 nmi (12,038 km) at 15 knots (28 km/h)
- Complement: 273
- Armament: 5 × 5 in (127 mm), 10 × 40 mm AA guns, 7 × 20 mm AA guns, 10 × 21 in (533 mm) torpedo tubes, 6 × depth charge projectors, 2 × depth charge tracks

USS Young (DD-580), a Fletcher-class destroyer, was the second ship of the United States Navy of that name. She was the first to be named for Rear Admiral Lucien Young (1852–1912).

Young was laid down on 7 May 1942 at Orange, Texas, by the Consolidated Steel Corp. The ship was launched on 15 October 1942, sponsored by Mrs. J. M. Schelling and commissioned on 31 July 1943.

== Service history ==
=== 1943 ===
Following a shakedown cruise in the Gulf of Mexico and the Caribbean Sea, USS Young briefly operated out of Guantanamo Bay, Cuba. During that assignment, she formed part of the escort for the battleship USS Iowa when Iowa carried President Franklin D. Roosevelt across the Atlantic on the first leg of his journey to the Teheran Conference of November 1943. In the midst of that voyage, the destroyer received orders instructing her to head for the Pacific theater. She transited the Panama Canal on 24 November and reported for duty with the Pacific Fleet. She arrived in Pearl Harbor early in December and received orders assigning her to the small U.S. 9th Fleet in the northmost Pacific Ocean. USS Young remained at Pearl Harbor for several weeks, and she then headed for the Aleutian Islands, where she arrived in mid-January 1944.

=== 1944 ===
The arrival of USS Young in Alaskan waters, however, came some three months after the Aleutians campaign ended. Her duties for the next eight months, therefore, consisted of escort and patrol missions spiced with an occasional bombardment of Japanese installations in the Kuril Islands. She was an element of Rear Admiral Wilder D. Baker's striking force on 2 February 1944 when that unit conducted the first bombardment of Japanese home territory in the Kurils. She twice returned to those islands in June, shelling Matsuwa on the 13th and Paramushiro on the 26th. Otherwise, her only enemy during the first eight months of 1944 proved to be the foul Aleutians weather.

During September, she returned to the United States for an overhaul. Upon completing repairs, the destroyer departed San Francisco Bay on 6 October, bound for the western Pacific. Reporting in at Manus Island in the Admiralty Islands late in the month, she was damaged by the November 1944 USS Mount Hood (AE-11) explosion.

After receiving orders to join the escort of a supply convoy bound for the newly invaded Philippines, she reached Leyte Island on 18 November in the midst of an enemy air attack on the invasion fleet. She and her colleagues in the convoy screen combined to splash three of the attacking aircraft.

On 19 December, Young departed Leyte with 10 other destroyers in the screen of the first Mindoro resupply echelon. The unit came under enemy air attack early in the morning of the 21st but encountered no concerted air opposition until near dusk. At about 17:18, a raid of five kamikazes broke through the combat air patrol, and three of the suicide planes succeeded in their missions, hitting LST-460, LST-479, and the Liberty ship SS Juan de Fuca. Both LSTs had to be abandoned, but Juan de Fuca continued on and reached Mindoro safely with the convoy on 22 December. During the return voyage, enemy planes returned to harass the convoy but failed to inflict damage. During the approach to and the retirement from Mindoro, Young claimed a total of five unassisted splashes and two assists.

=== 1945 ===
USS Young's first amphibious assault came during the invasion of Luzon in January 1945. During the main landing on 9 January, she served as a unit of the screen for the landing craft of Attack Group "Baker" and covered part of the landings at Lingayen Gulf itself. The assault went off practically unopposed, in an example of the new Japanese tactics of fighting an amphibious force inland with conventional infantry tactics rather than trying to smash the landing at the beach. Since the American troops encountered no real resistance until they had advanced inland well beyond the range of destroyer guns, Young and her accompanying warships had little to do at Lingayen Gulf.

That pattern repeated itself at Zambales later in the month when Young, in reconnoitering the landing area, encountered a small boat embarking a Filipino guerrilla lieutenant who informed the destroyer that the area had already been secured by his forces. The Zambales landing went off without a shot being fired.

During operations around Subic and Manila Bays, the warship joined USS Nicholas in destroying two Japanese 17-foot (5.2 m) suicide boats sent in from Corregidor to break up the Mariveles occupation force on 14 February. Two days later, she participated in the reduction and capture of the source of those boats—Corregidor. She bombarded "The Rock" before the assault and then helped silence enemy batteries on Caballo Island when they opened up on the landing craft. Later that morning, she threaded her way through mine-infested waters to provide gunfire support for the troops taking the island fortress.

During the following weeks, USS Young conducted patrols out of Subic Bay. In April, she supported one of the U.S. Army's landings on Mindanao, but that operation, thanks to strong Moro guerrilla activity, proved to be another walkover. She continued her patrol operations in the Philippines until the end of the third week in May at which time she received orders to return to the United States for repairs. Steaming via Eniwetok Atoll and Pearl Harbor, Hawaii, she arrived in San Francisco Bay on 12 June and began a 47-day overhaul at the Mare Island Navy Yard.

Late in July, USS Young completed her post-overhaul trials and, early in August, she headed back toward Pearl Harbor. However, by the time of her arrival, hostilities had already ceased. Instead of continuing westwards, she began operations in the Hawaiian Islands area as escort and plane guard for the aircraft carrier USS Saratoga. On 25 September, she departed Hawaii in company with various units of the U.S. 3rd Fleet en route to the East Coast for the 1945 Navy Day celebration. On 27 October, Young arrived in New York City, where President Harry Truman reviewed the assembled ships.

Young remained in New York until 1 November when she steamed towards Charleston, South Carolina, where she was placed in reserve on 31 January 1946. Finally decommissioned sometime in January 1947, the destroyer remained in reserve until 1 May 1968, at which time her name was stricken from the Navy list. On 6 March 1970, USS Young was sunk as a target off the mid-Atlantic coast. USS Young earned five battle stars during World War II.
