= USS Killen =

Fletcher-class destroyer

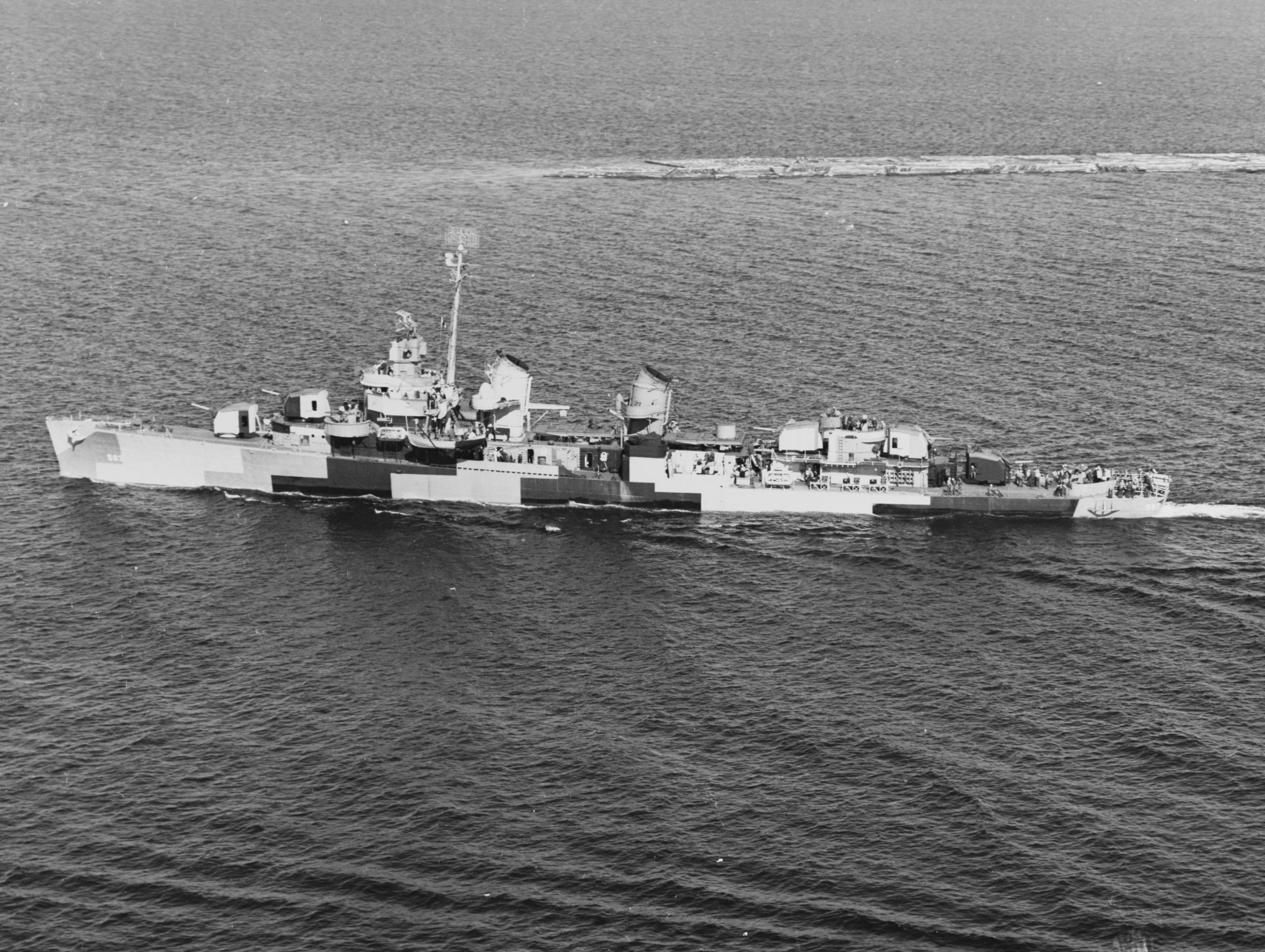
- USS Killen (DD-593) off Richmond Beach, Washington, 8 June 1944.

History

United States
- Name: Killen
- Namesake: Edward Killen
- Builder: Puget Sound Naval Shipyard
- Laid down: 26 November 1941
- Launched: 10 January 1943
- Commissioned: 4 May 1944
- Decommissioned: 9 July 1946
- Stricken: 1 June 1963
- Fate: Sunk as a target, 15 April 1975

General characteristics
- Class & type: Fletcher-class destroyer
- Displacement: 2,050 tons
- Length: 376 ft 6 in (114.7 m)
- Beam: 39 ft 8 in (12.1 m)
- Draft: 17 ft 9 in (5.4 m)
- Propulsion: 60,000 shp (45 MW); 2 propellers
- Speed: 35 knots (65 km/h; 40 mph)
- Range: 6500 nmi. (12,000 km) at 15 kt
- Complement: 329
- Armament: 5 × 5 in (130 mm), 4 × 40 mm AA guns, 4 × 20 mm AA guns, 10 × 21 inch (533 mm) torpedo tubes, 6 × depth charge projectors, 2 × depth charge tracks

USS Killen (DD-593), was a Fletcher-class destroyer of the United States Navy.

== Namesake ==
Edward Killen joined the Navy on 5 May 1801 as a seaman aboard the schooner USS Enterprise. Accompanying her to the Mediterranean he was promoted to Master's Mate on 9 November 1803. He volunteered for Lieutenant Stephen Decatur's expedition into Tripoli Harbor on 16 February 1804 to destroy USS Philadelphia, a United States frigate captured by Tripolitan pirates in the First Barbary War. After successfully completing this mission on USS Intrepid, Killen served on board Enterprise until his death on 24 July 1806.

== Construction and commissioning ==
Killen was launched on 10 January 1943, by the Puget Sound Navy Yard, Bremerton, Washington; sponsored by Mrs. Inez Cowdrey; and commissioned on 4 May 1944 at Hunters Point Naval Shipyard. Comdr. H. G. Corey in command.

== World War II ==
After shakedown Killen cleared Port Angeles, Wash. on 19 August 1944, escorted a convoy from Pearl Harbor and arrived at Manus, Admiralty Islands on 14 September. Following training exercises the destroyer departed Hollandia on 12 October with the Central Philippine Attack Force that arrived off San Pedro Bay on the 20th. For the next 5 days she gave day and night fire support to troops ashore on Leyte, and during one 30-minute period on the 21st silenced three enemy artillery positions. When the Japanese Navy decided to contest the landings in the Battle of Leyte Gulf, Killen's squadron engaged the enemy at Surigao Strait. On the morning of 25 October, at 03:25, she launched five torpedoes toward battleship Yamashiro. One hit, slowing her to 5 knots (9.3 km/h), enabled other American destroyers to maneuver for the kill. In the widespread fleet actions for Leyte, covering hundreds of thousands of nautical miles, the U.S. Fleet reduced the Japanese Fleet to an ineffective force thus greatly speeding up the advance toward Japan and end of the war.

Killen resumed antiaircraft screen. While on patrol off Leyte on 1 November she was attacked by seven enemy aircraft. The destroyer splashed four raiders before a bomb from one of the attackers found its mark in Killen's port side, killing 15. After temporary repairs at San Pedro Bay and Manus, she steamed into Hunter's Point, Calif., on 15 January 1945, for overhaul.

Returning to Manus on 9 May, the destroyer sailed the next day for convoy escort and patrol duty in the Philippines. Killen formed part of the screen for the cruiser USS Nashville carrying General Douglas MacArthur to nearly every island in the chain to give his "I have returned" speech.

Lacking the propulsion system necessary to operate with the fast carriers around Okinawa, Killen was kept in the south with the cruiser fleet. She steamed into Brunei Bay, Borneo, on 10 June with the assault forces, and supported the troops with prelanding bombardment. She resumed exercises on 15 June before arriving off Balikpapan, Borneo, on 27 June for fire support missions. After silencing enemy shore batteries on Borneo, Killen prepared for the final phase of the Pacific war as she arrived Manila on 14 July. She cleared that port 2 weeks later, and joined the North Pacific Force in the Aleutian Islands.

Upon the cessation of hostilities the destroyer was assigned to the occupation forces in the Japanese islands. Departing Adak on 31 August, Killen took up station at Ominato in northern Honshū, and supported the occupation forces until 14 November, when she sailed to Puget Sound. From there she proceeded to San Diego, arriving on 2 April, and decommissioning on 9 July 1946.

== Target ship ==
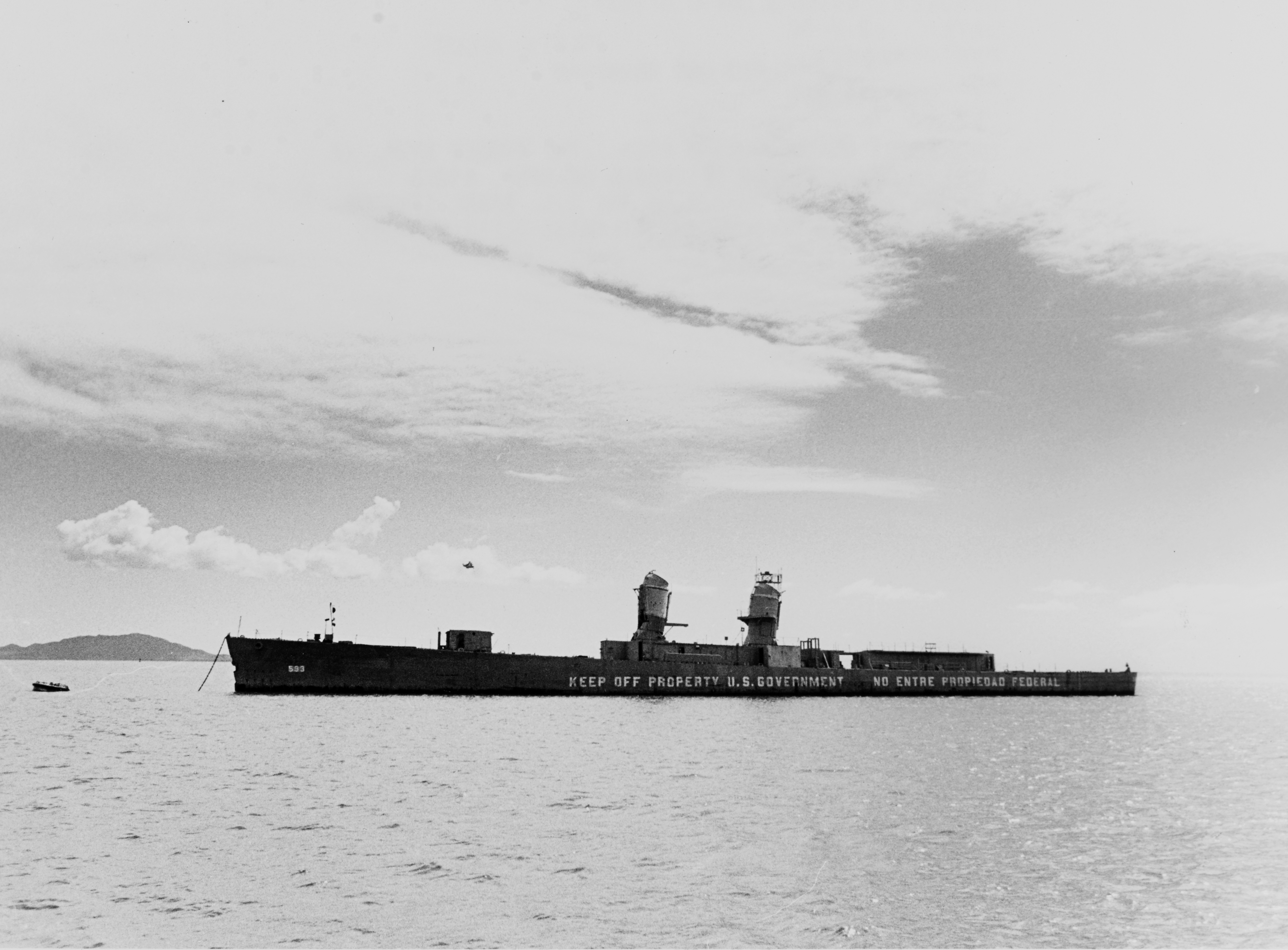
Killen as a target ship moored off Roosevelt Roads, Puerto Rico, 2 February 1970.

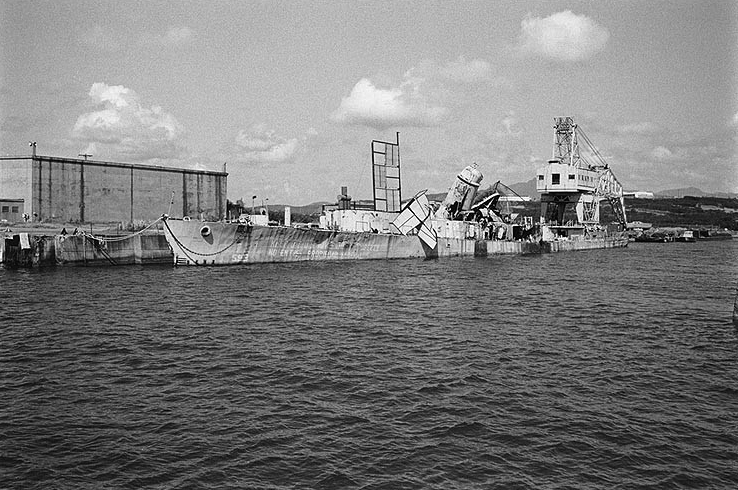
Hulk of Killen tied up at Roosevelt Roads, 1975.

The veteran destroyer served as a target ship during the atom bomb tests in 1958 (Operation Hardtack I, shots WAHOO and UMBRELLA), and in 1962 engaged in high explosive tests in the Chesapeake Bay to assess the structural effects of the ship's nuclear exposures. Killen was struck from the Navy List and sent to the US Naval Station at Roosevelt Roads, P.R. in January 1963 to be used as a target ship for missile and gunnery practice off the nearby Puerto Rican island of Vieques where she was eventually sunk/scuttled in a shallow bay in 1975 and still lies today.

Studies and site visits made in 1999 by a Puerto Rican marine archaeologist and the University of Georgia discovered nearly two hundred steel barrels of unknown origin and contents among the wreckage of Killen. Based on government descriptions of the nuclear tests in the Pacific, some scientists and Vieques environmental activists have been concerned that nuclear-fallout cleaning materials were likely stored inside those barrels and improperly disposed, possibly entering the local environment prior to sinking or exposing contaminants to the animals and habitat of Bahia Salina del Sur in Vieques after sinking.

In 2003–2004, a Virginia-based company called Underwater Ordnance Recovery (UOR), in cooperation with the University of Georgia, was contracted by the Commonwealth of Puerto Rico's Justice Department to again study the wreck. Nothing unexpected was found. In conclusion, the barrels were probably just used for ballast & buoyancy during Killen's career as a target, and were never a danger at all. UOR's final conclusion, issued in March 2004, was that Killen presented minimal to no environmental danger and should be left alone as it is now serving as an artificial reef for sea life.

== Awards ==
Killen received two battle stars for World War II service.
