= Naval Base Manus =

Major US Navy Base on Manus Island, Papua New Guinea

Manus Naval Base
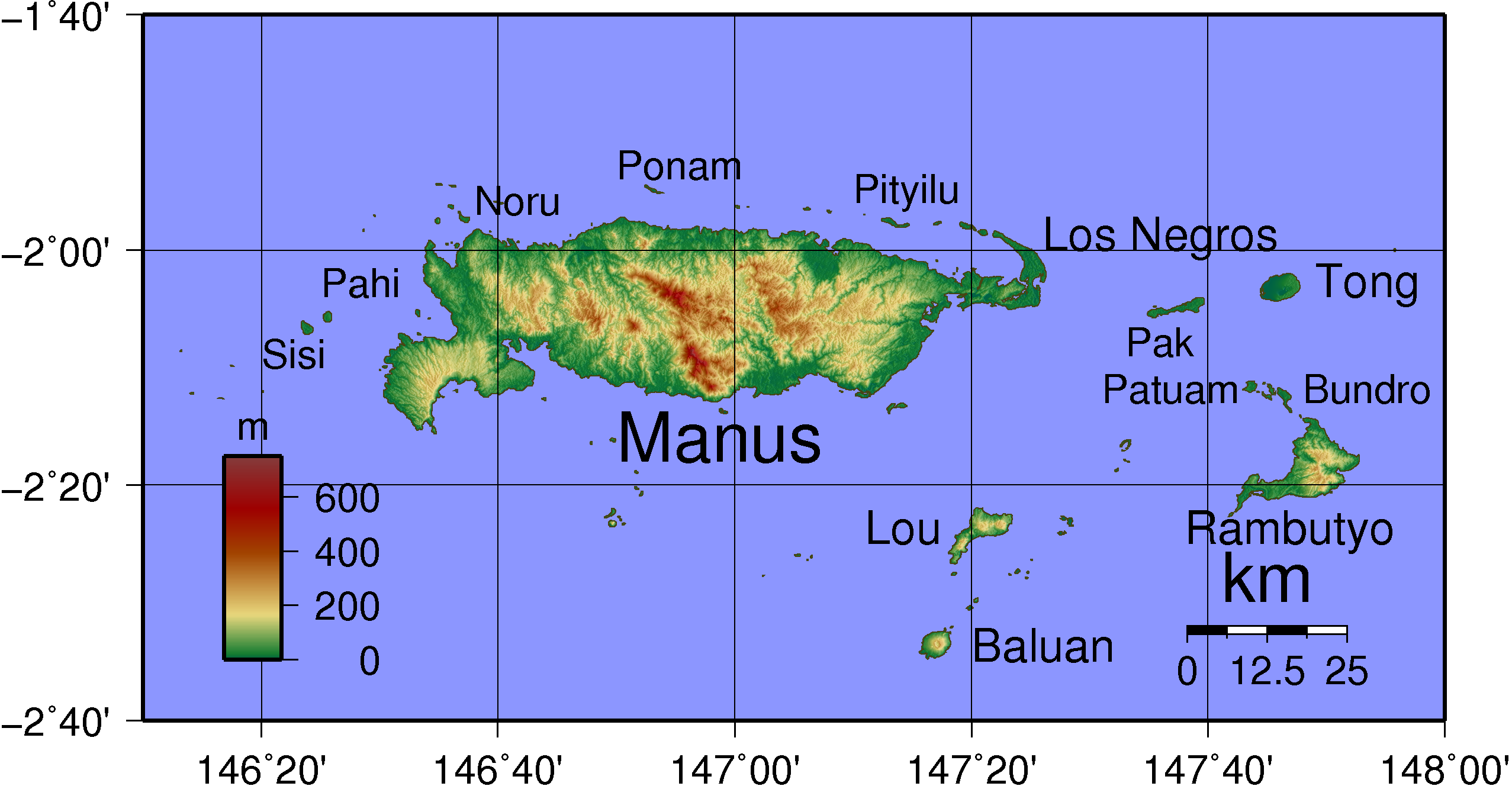
- Location of the Manus Naval Base on Manus Island among the Admiralty Islands; Base was on the east end of the island

- Location within Papua New Guinea

Geography
- Coordinates: 2°01′50″S 147°16′20″E
- Archipelago: Admiralty Islands
- Area: 2,100 km^{2} (810 sq mi)
- Length: 100 km (60 mi)
- Width: 30 km (19 mi)
- Highest elevation: 718 m (2356 ft)
- Highest point: Mt. Dremsel
- Naval Base Administrative: United States Navy; 1944-1947
- Largest settlement: Lorengau; Largest bases: Seeadler Harbor; Lombrum Naval Base

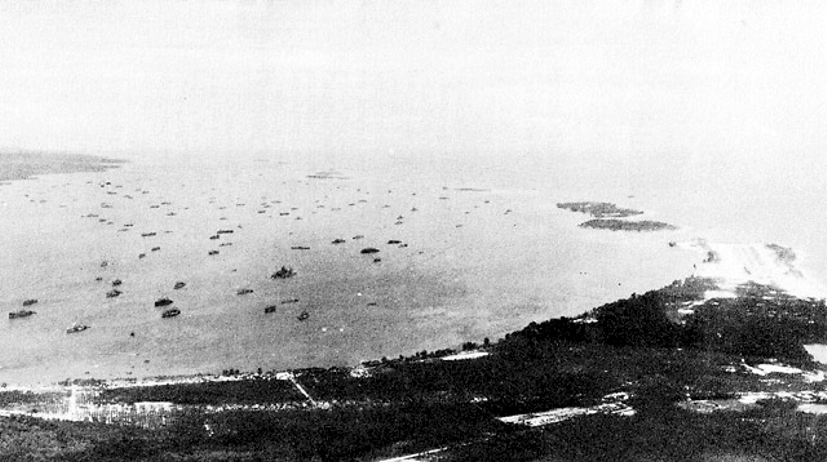
Aerial view of Seeadler Harbor in 1945, with US Navy Fleet Anchorage

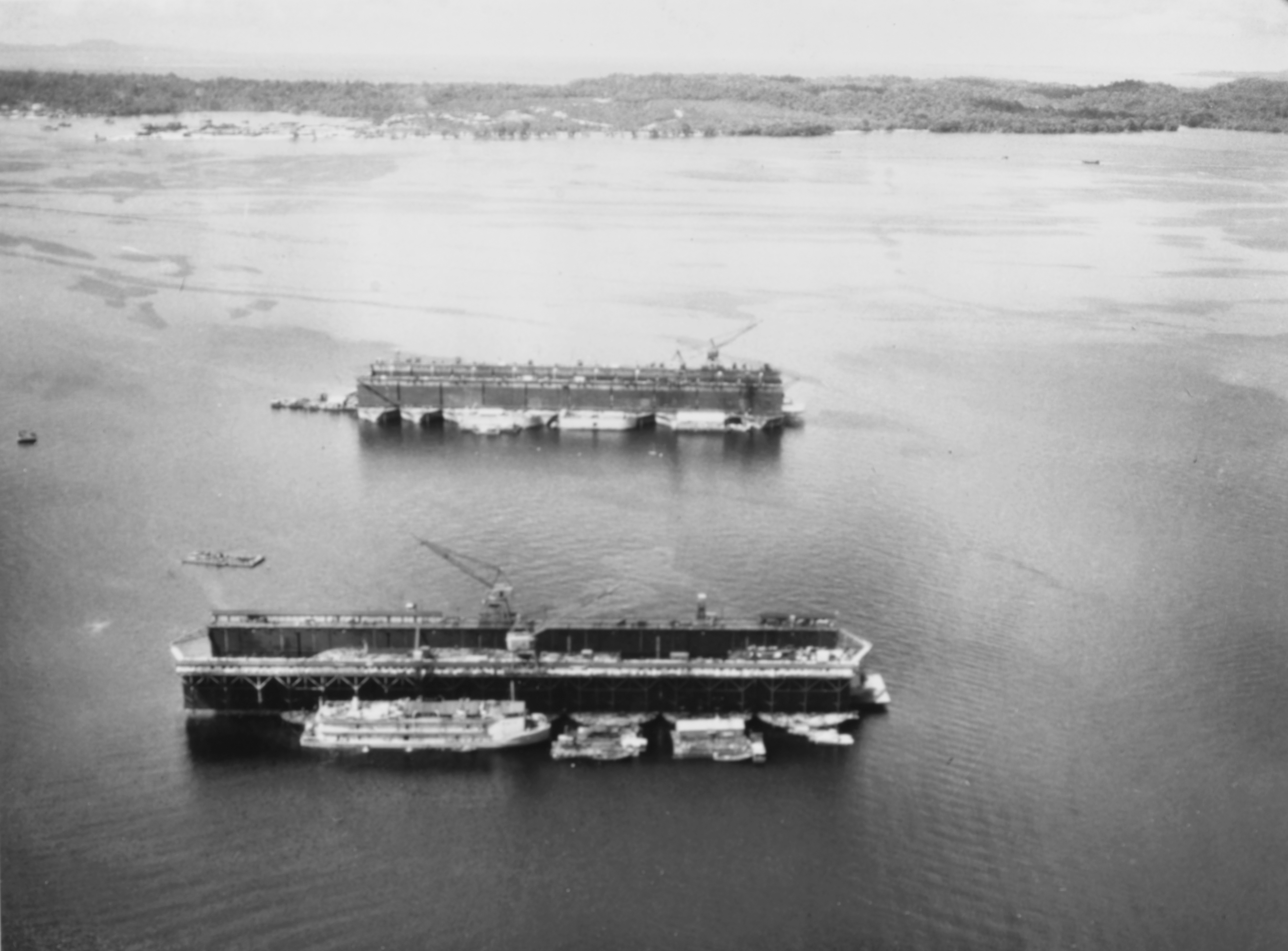
Floating ship repair dock ABSD-4 background in Seeadler Harbor with ABSD-2 (foreground) in September 1945

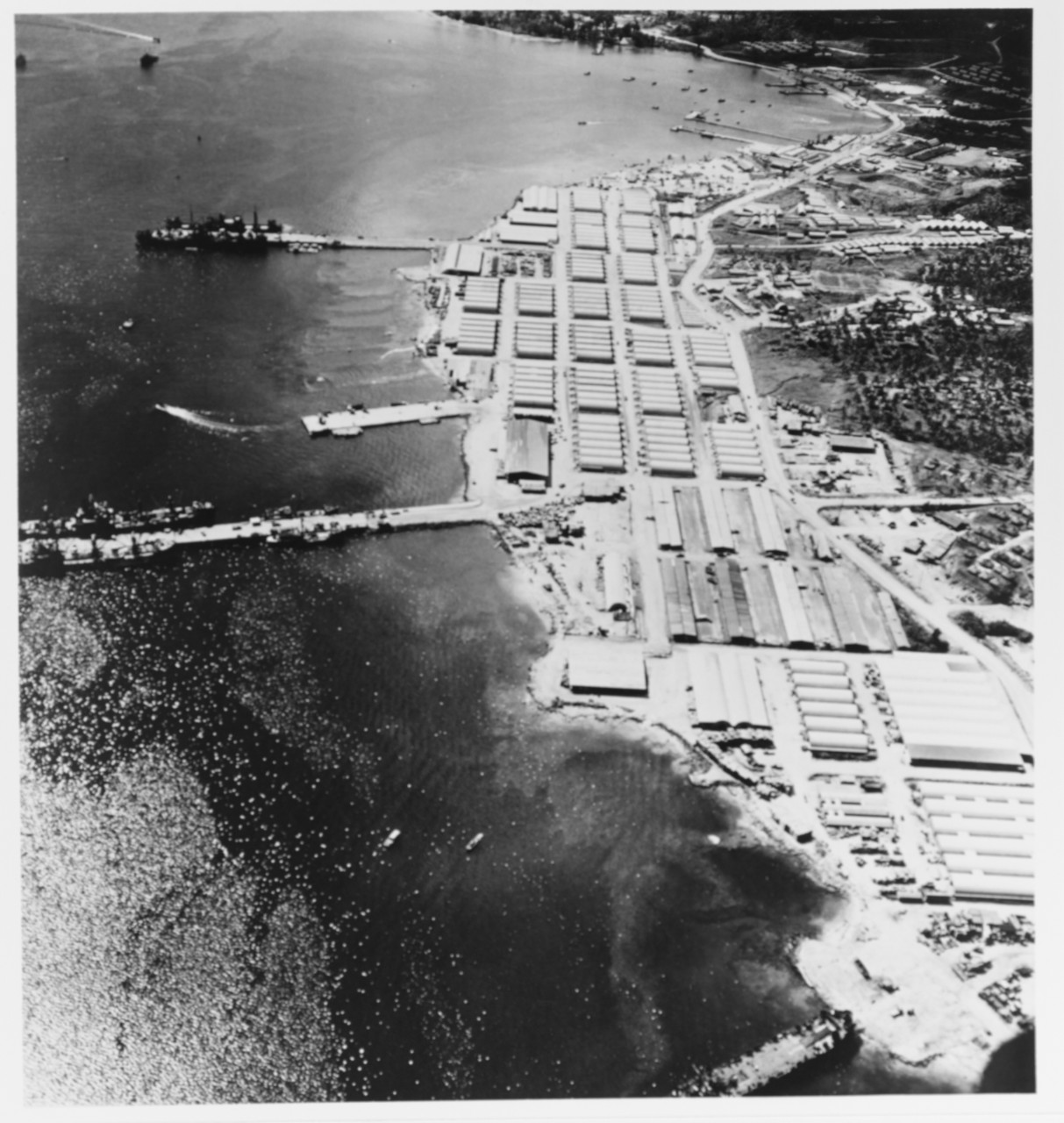
Manus Naval Base, Naval supply depot with piers and quonset Hut warehouses on September 18, 1945

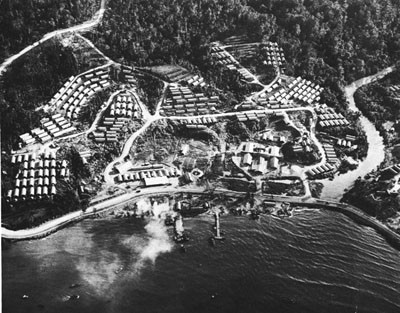
Naval Receiving Station, Lorengau, Manus, November 1944

Manus Naval Base was a number of bases built after the World War II Battle of Manus by United States Navy on the Manus Island and a smaller island just east, Los Negros Island in the Admiralty Islands chain. The major naval base construction started with the Los Negros landings on February 28, 1944. The Navy repaired and did the expansion of the airfields on the Admiralty Islands. United States Navy Seabee built or repaired the facilities on the islands. The large Manus Naval Base, also called the Admiralty Island base, supported United States Seventh Fleet, Southwest Pacific command, and part of the Pacific Fleet. The base was abandoned by the US Navy after the war.

== History ==
Japanese called Los Negros Island the Hyane Island and had built some facilities on the two islands. Manus Island was picked for a major air and sea base as it was near Empire of Japan strong points: 387 miles to Rabaul, 694 miles to Truk, 273 miles Kavieng and 244 miles to Wewak. The other reason was Manus Island's Seeadler Harbor, which offered the largest and most protected Southwest Pacific fleet anchorage.

By March 1944 the beaches were secured enough that the Seabees started construction. The first airfield captured was Hyane Airfield which was renamed Momote Airfield. While the airfield was captured the outlining area still had fighting and the airfield was attacked two times while under construction. Hyane Airfield has one 4,000-foot runway in poor condition. On March 10, fighter planes began using the Momote Airfield. Seabees completed all Momote Airfield construction and improvements on June 1, 1944 and turned the 7,800-feet runway Momote Airfield over to the United States Army Air Forces. The newly built air base had a camp, 90 fighters and 80 bombers, a tank farm with 17,000-barrel aviation gasoline that was filled from a small T1 tanker harbor and an ammunition depot. On April 1, 1944 Seabees started construction at Mokerang Airfield on Los Negros Island with the US Army engineers. The existing runway was improved to 8,000 feet and a new second 8,000 feet runway was built. Built at Mokerang Airfield were: a base camp, supply depot, repair depot, and a 30,000-barrel tank farm.

At Hyane Harbor Seabees constructed a 500-bed evacuation hospital for the US Army. For the US Navy, at Hyane Harbor Seabees built a waterfront complex: two cargo ship wharves, a repair pier, 800-foot ship refueling pier, and a ship unloading and repair crane. Also starting on June 19, 1944, at Hyane Harbor was a pontoon assembly depot, as it was found that shipping pontoon flat, unassembled took a lot less space in ships. The pontoon depot had a personnel camp and warehouses. For the US Army and Navy a large aviation supply depot was built. For the Navy a 5,000 runway was built and a 7,000-barrel aviation-gasoline tank farm. To support the activity at Hyane Harbor a small-boat repair depot and camp was built. As the built up in the Pacific continued in April 1944, two new camp constructions were started on Los Negros Island: Papitalai Point and one at Lombrum Point. At Papitalai Point Seabee 58th Battalion built a base camp, depot, a PT boat overhaul base, fuel oil and diesel tank farm. Seabee started work at Lombrum Point on April 17, 1944, which become Lombrum Naval Base. At Lombrum Point Seabee built seaplane repair base, a ship repair base, and a Landing craft repair base. Each base required the building of camps, depots, piers and shops. Landing craft base supported LCT, LSM, and a host of smaller landing craft. For ship repair, different sized Auxiliary floating drydocks were towed to the base. The largest USS AFDB-2 and USS ABSD-4 were able to drydock battleships.

Also at Lombrum Point Seabee built a seaplane base with a concrete seaplane ramp and 8,000-barrel tank farm. At the captured coastal Lorengau Airfield a large supply depot was built. Lorengau Airfield was a 3,500-foot grass runway and due to lack of space, it was not improved, but a support camp and depot was built at the Lorengau Airfield. Navy Base headquarters was built at Lorengau, near the mouth of Lorengau River. At the Lorengau Navy Base Seabee built a 1,000-bed Navy Hospital 15. The headquarters also had a camp for 5,000 men incoming Troops. Pityilu Airfield, on Pityilu Island was built to support aircraft carriers, with a training center and storage of 350 spare fighter planes for later aircraft carrier use. Ponam Airfield on Ponam Island was also built to support aircraft carrier fighter planes.

After the war, most bases were abandoned in 1946 and 1947. Momote Airfield became Momote Airport. Some bases were turned over to the Royal Australian Navy and later to the Papua New Guinea Defence Force.

== Bases and facilities ==
- Seeadler Harbor Large fleet anchorage (some times called Manus Island Harbor or Manus Harbor)
- Lombrum Seaplane Base, with PBY Catalina, JRF Goose, PBM Mariner (VPB-71, VPB-52), VP-33 and VPB-34 PBY-1 Patrols and air-sea rescue, and FAW-17 Patrol and Reconnaissance
- PT Boat Base
- Submarine chaser base
- Pityilu Island fleet recreation center for up to 10,000 troops.
- Lombrum Naval Base (HMPNGS Tarangau)
- Advanced Base Construction Depot (ABCD) - Seabee Camp
- Mokerang, floating Liberty ship dock, a fixed Liberty dock, and a pile dock
- LST landing beach
- USS Hope (AH-7), USS Bountiful (AH-9) and USS Refuge (AH-11) hospital ships
- Lorengau Naval Depot
- Naval Air Station Receiving station, Lorengau
- Salami, communication center
- Koruniat Island, on 4 April 1944, the 5th Cavalry established a base on this island.
- Crash boat base
- Ammunition depots
- Base and Fleet Headquarters
- Post office FPO# 3205 SF Manus Island
- Quartermaster depot
- Medical center
- 128 storage depot buildings
- 50 refrigerator storage units
- 5 miles of road
- Water-supply systems able to produce 4,000,000 gallons per day
- Many piers and Pontoons docks
- Sawmill
- Coral quarries for fill
- Power Plants
- Radar Stations
- Mess halls
- Tankers: USS Caribou, USS Alameda, USS Arethusa, USS Leopard and USS Armadillo

*Repair Base

- Major ship repair base with Large auxiliary floating drydock USS ABSD-4 and ASDB-2
- USS ARD-19 Floating dry dock
- USS White Sands (ARD-20)
- Service Squadron - Lombrum
- Part depots - Lombrum
- Machine shops
- Engineering camp
- Chemical Engineering Camp
- Motor pool
- USS Argonne (AS-10)
- USS Mindanao (ARG-3)
- USS Medusa (AR-1)
- USS Briareus (AR-12)
- USS Vestal
- USS Cebu (ARG-6)
- USS Fortune (IX-146)
- USS Aviation, parts ship
- USS Piedmont (AD-17)
- USS Sierra (AD-18)
- USS Whitney (AD-4)
- USS Amycus
- USS Current (ARS-22)
- USS Apache (ATF-67)
- USS Chimaera (ARL-33)
- USS Currituck (AV-7)
- USS Creon (ARL-11)
- USS Oyster Bay (AGP-6)
- USS Euryale
- USS Tangier (AV-8)
- USS San Pablo (AVP-30)
- USS Willoughby (AGP-9)
- USS Wright (AV-1)

== Airfields ==
- Mokerang Airfield two 8,000 feet bomber runways, Army and Navy use.
- Momote Airfield (Hyane Airfield) 7,800-feet foot runway, turned over to US Army, after war Momote Airport.
- Lorengau Airfield 3,500 foot grass runway, not used, became supply depot.
- NAS Ponam Airfield on Ponam Island was built by the US Navy in June 1944. This was an aircraft carrier fighter plane overhaul base, has one coral-surfaced 5,000 foot runway. Ponam Airfield did anti-submarine warfare patrols. Later became HMS Nabaron, after the US Navy closed base on September 1, 1947. It was also used by the Royal Navy in March–April 1945, camp was at 1.914413°S 146.887171°E.
  - Based at Ponam Airfield was:
  - 78th Naval Construction Battalion
  - 140th Battalion
  - ACORN 28 - Seabee unit
  - VMF-312 (24 x FG Vought F4U Corsair unit)
  - VP-130 (15 Lockheed Ventura [PV-1] unit)
  - VC-75 (Grumman F4F Wildcat unit)
  - Carrier Aircraft Service Unit 42
  - Carrier Aircraft Service Unit 13
  - Carrier Aircraft Service 587
  - Mobile Naval Air Base 4, (Royal Navy)
- NAS Pityilu Airfield, on Pityilu Island Built by US Navy in 1944, 5,500 feet runway. aircraft carrier fighter plane training base, with storage of 350 spare planes. Complete camp for 5,000 troops. Was later transferred to the Royal Navy, camp is at 1.960412°S 147.222106°E
  - Based at Pityilu Airfield was:
  - VPB-146 (PV-1, Lockheed Ventura unit)
  - ACORN 28
  - VJ-2 (JM-1 detachment Able, Martin B-26 Marauder unit)
  - Carrier Aircraft Service Unit 42
  - Carrier Aircraft Service Unit 13
- US Navy 5,000 foot x 150 feet runway with 7,000-barrel aviation-gasoline storage
  - VR-13 Naval Air Transport Service, Brisbane to Manus, with R4D-5 and RY-2 planes
  - VPB-117 with PB4Y-1 Liberators
  - VB-106 with PB4Y-1 Liberators

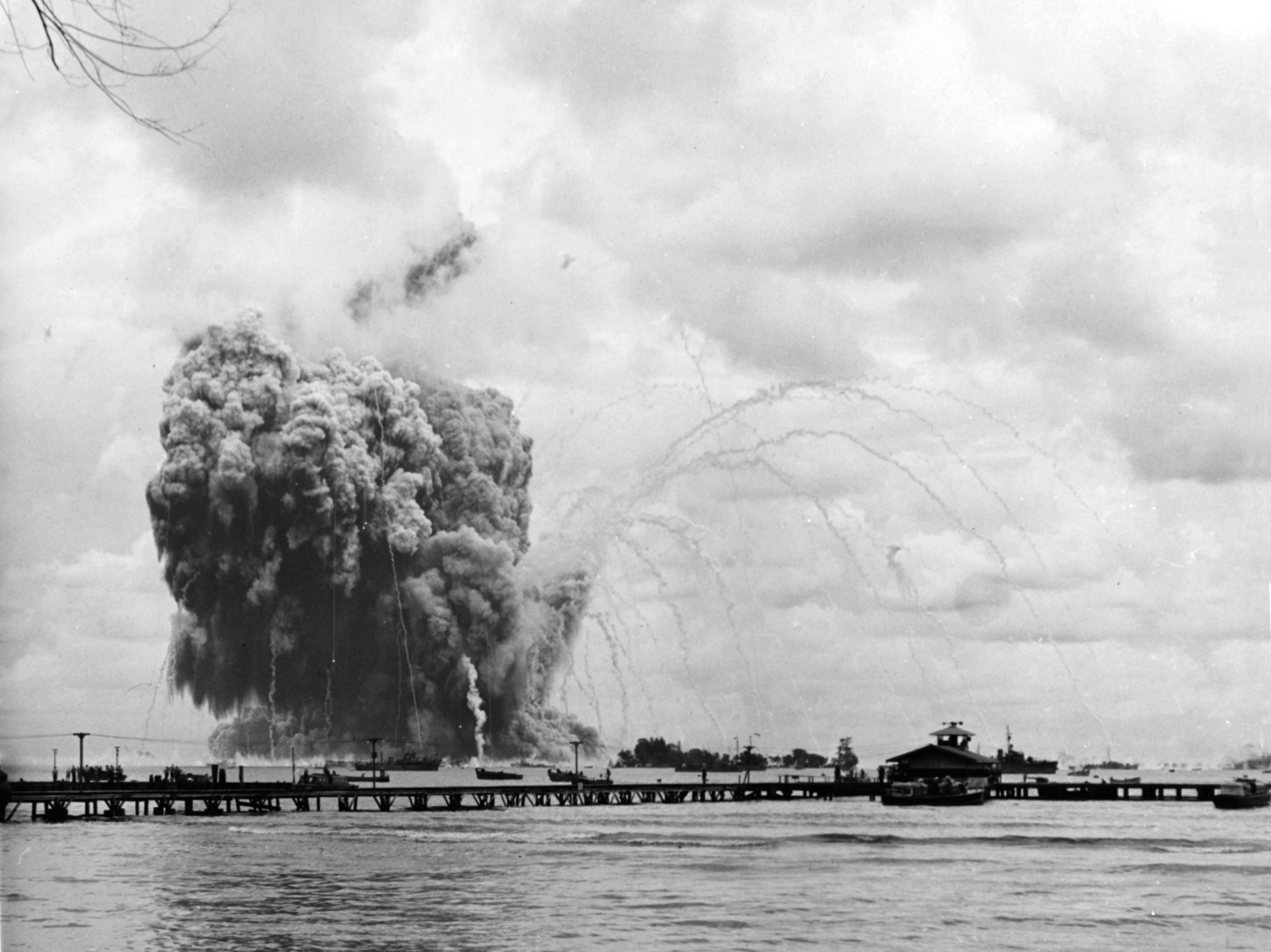
Mount Hood explodes: the smoke trails are left by fragments ejected by the explosion.

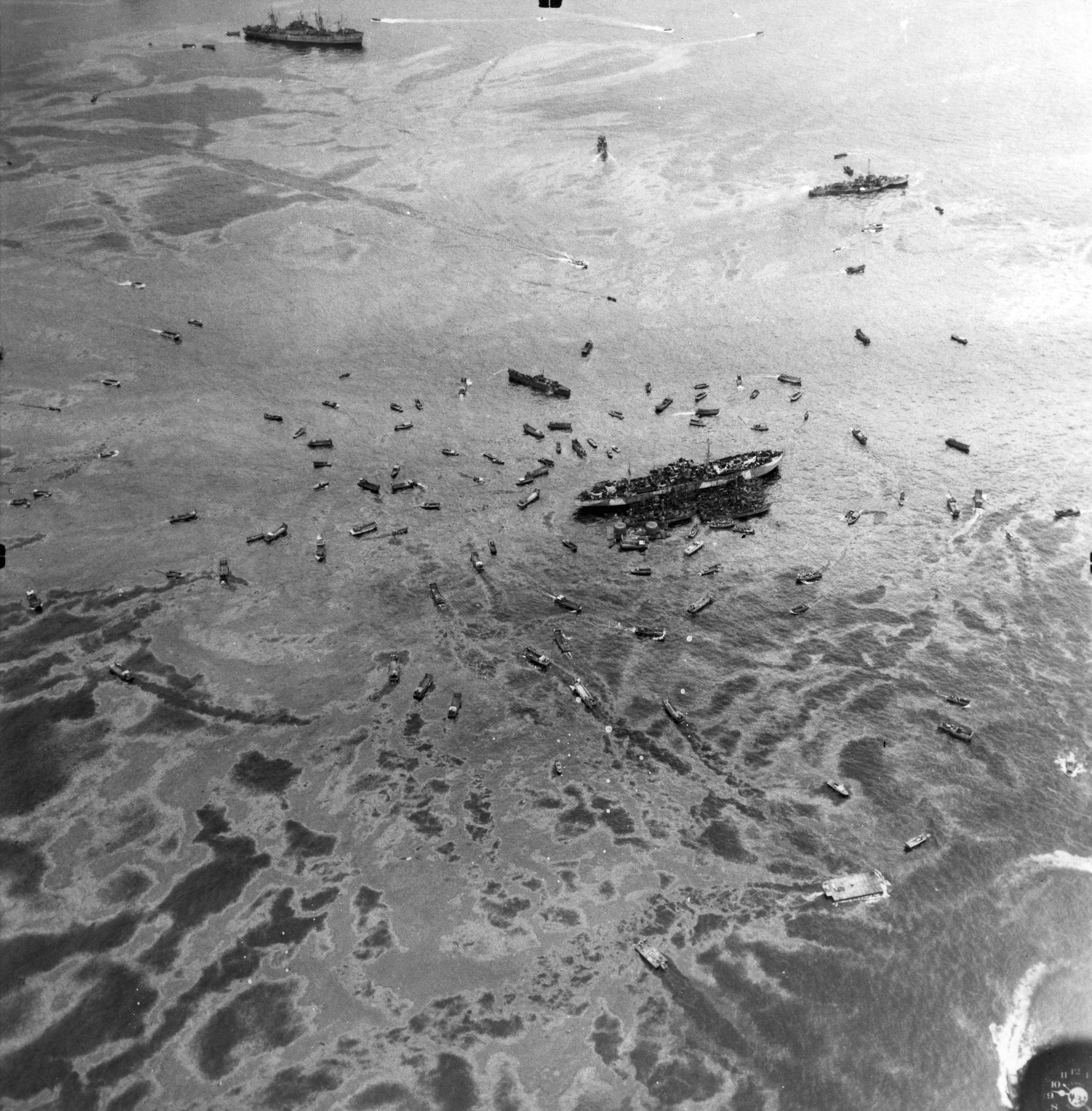
Aerial view of USS Mindanao (ARG-3) after the explosion of USS Mount Hood (AE-11) at Seeadler Harbor on November 10, 1944

== Attacks and losses ==
- USS Mount Hood (AE-11), an ammunition ship, exploded on November 10, 1944 in Seeadler Harbor. The 350 men on the ship were killed. She damaged nearby ships, including the USS Mindanao which had 180 crewmen killed and injured by the explosion.
- USS ABSD-4 was attacked on April 22, 1945, Mitsubishi A6M Zero thought that the large floating dock was an aircraft carrier and damaged the dry dock.
- USS AFDB-2 was attacked on April 22, 1945 also, damaging section G.

== Seabees units ==
- Seabees working on Manus Naval Base:
- 2nd Naval Construction Regiment: 11th, 58th and 71st Naval Construction Battalion
- 5th Naval Construction Regiment: 35th, 44th, and 57th Battalions
- 40th Battalion
- 46th Battalion
- 78th Battalion
- 17th Battalion
- 58th Battalion
- 104th Battalion
- 20th Special Battalion
- 21st Special Battalion
- 22nd Special Battalion
- 63rd Battalion
- 140th Battalion
- 561 Construction Battalion
- 587 Construction Battalion
- 621 Construction Battalion
- PAD 1 - Navy Pontoons Battalion

== Post war ==
On January 1, 1950 Royal Australian Navy (RAN) founded HMAS Seeadler, HMPNGS Tarangau (PNG Defence Force Base Lombrum) at the former US Naval Base. The new base replace the older base at Dreger Harbour, near Finschhafen. to replace the RAN base at Dreger Harbour, near Finschhafen. The base was renamed HMAS Tarangau, the name of the former Dreger Harbour base, on 1 April 1950.

- Monument 1st Calvary Division Memorial - Los Negros
- Remains AFDB / ABSD Auxiliary Floating Dry Dock 2 - Los Negros
- Remains AFDB / ABSD Auxiliary Floating Dry Dock 4
- Ship wreck Wrecks LCVP Landing Crafts - Los Negros
- Ship Wreck "USS Mount Hood (AE-11)" - Los Negros
- Japanese Shipwreck - Los Negros 2.030551°S 147.382715°E.

== Gallery ==
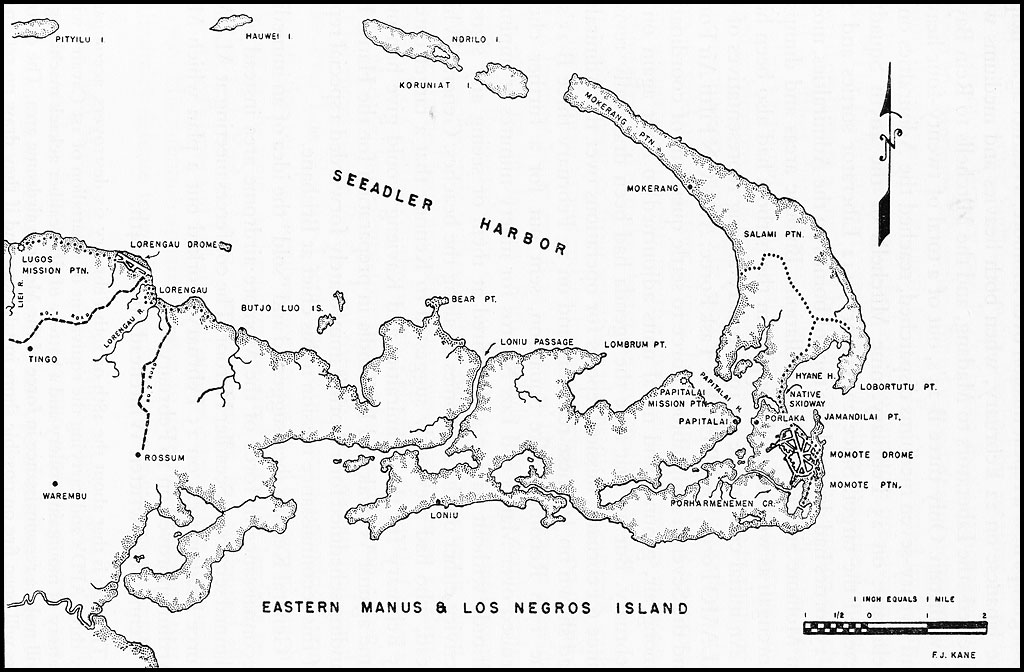
US Navy map Manus Naval Base in 1945

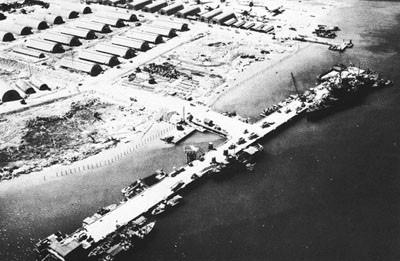
Ship Repair Facilities Manus Naval Base at Lombrum in 1944. Built by 46th Seabees

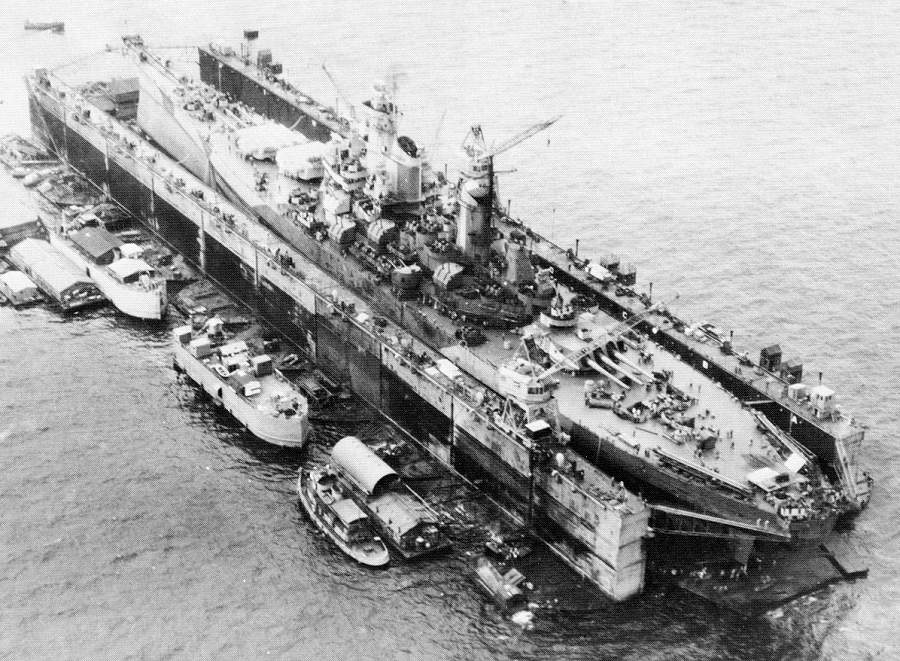
USS Iowa battleship being repaired at Manus Naval Base on December 28, 1944

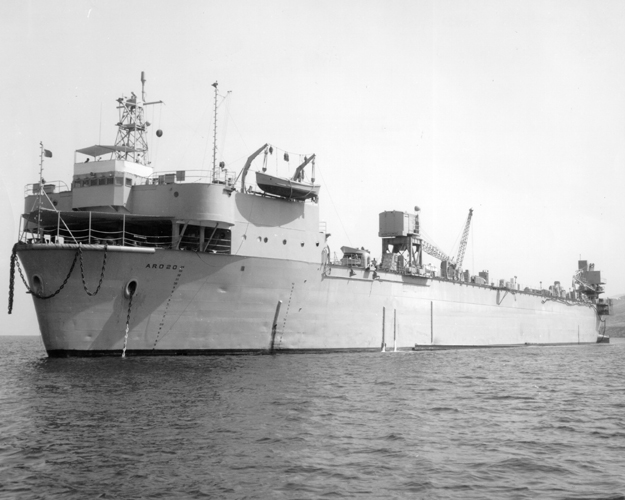
ARD-20 floating repair dry dock, for repairing subs, destroyers, and small vessels

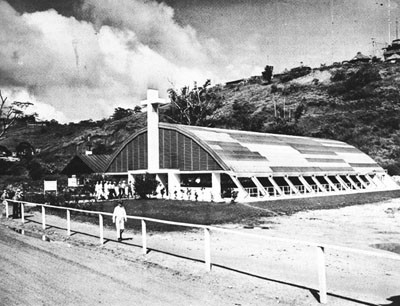
Manus Naval Base Chapel. Chapel dedication services on Easter morning, April 1, 1945

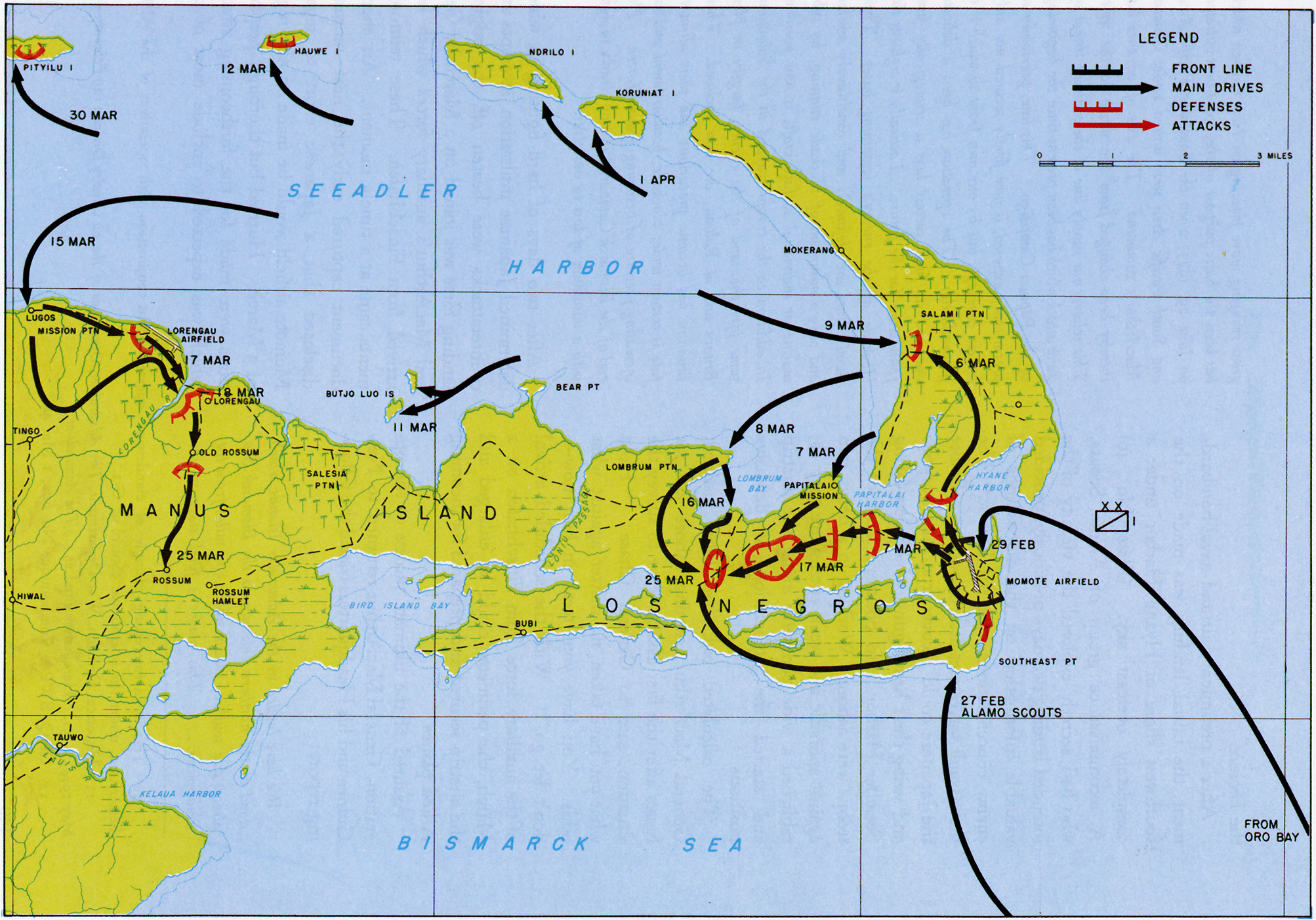
Map Admiralty Islands operations, 29 February to 30 May 1944

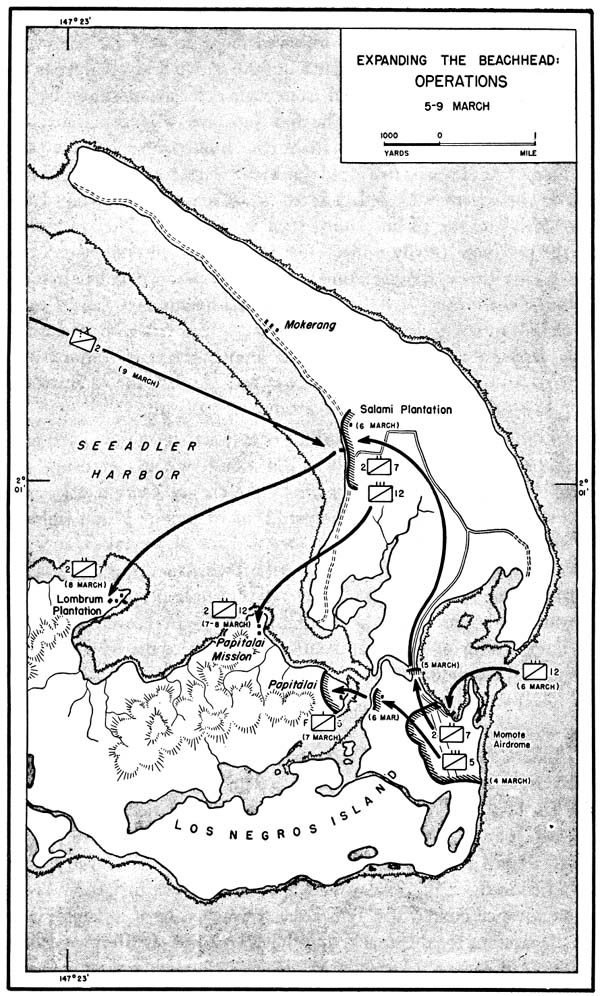
Admiralty Islands map 1944

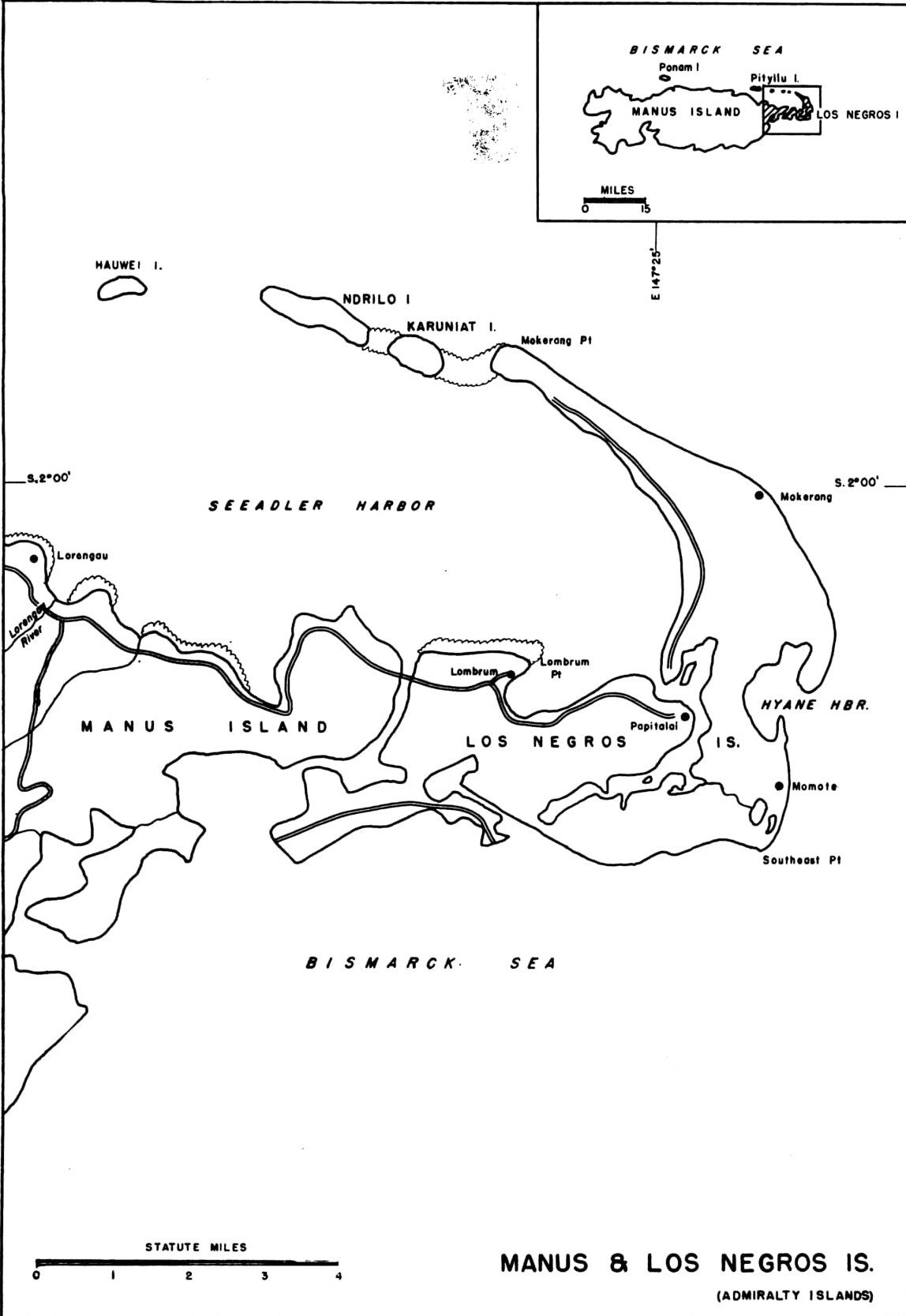
Map of Manus and Los Negros

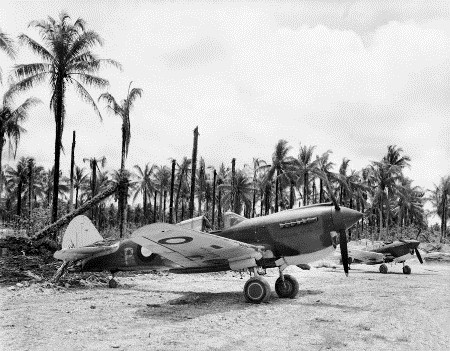
RAAF Kittyhawks on Momote Airfield, 8 March 1944

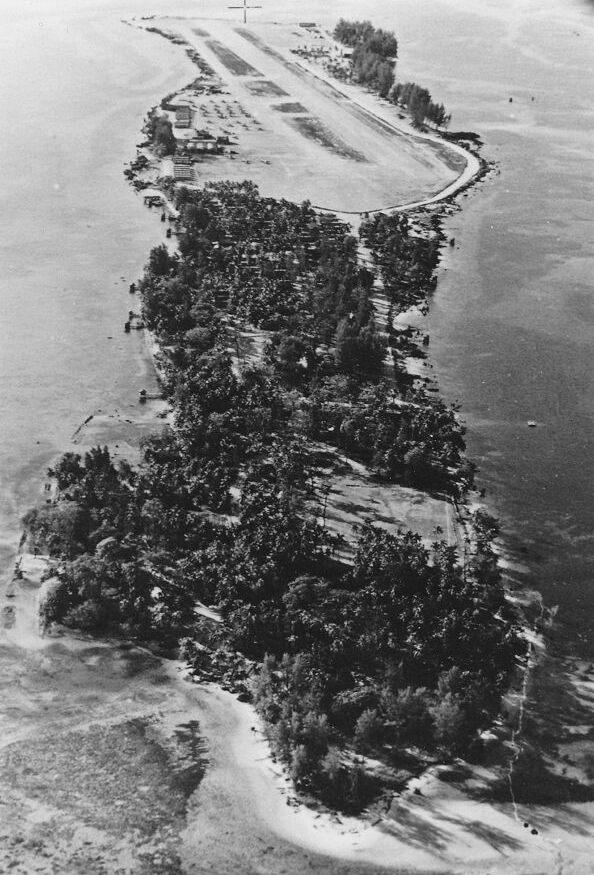
Ponam Island with runway and base.

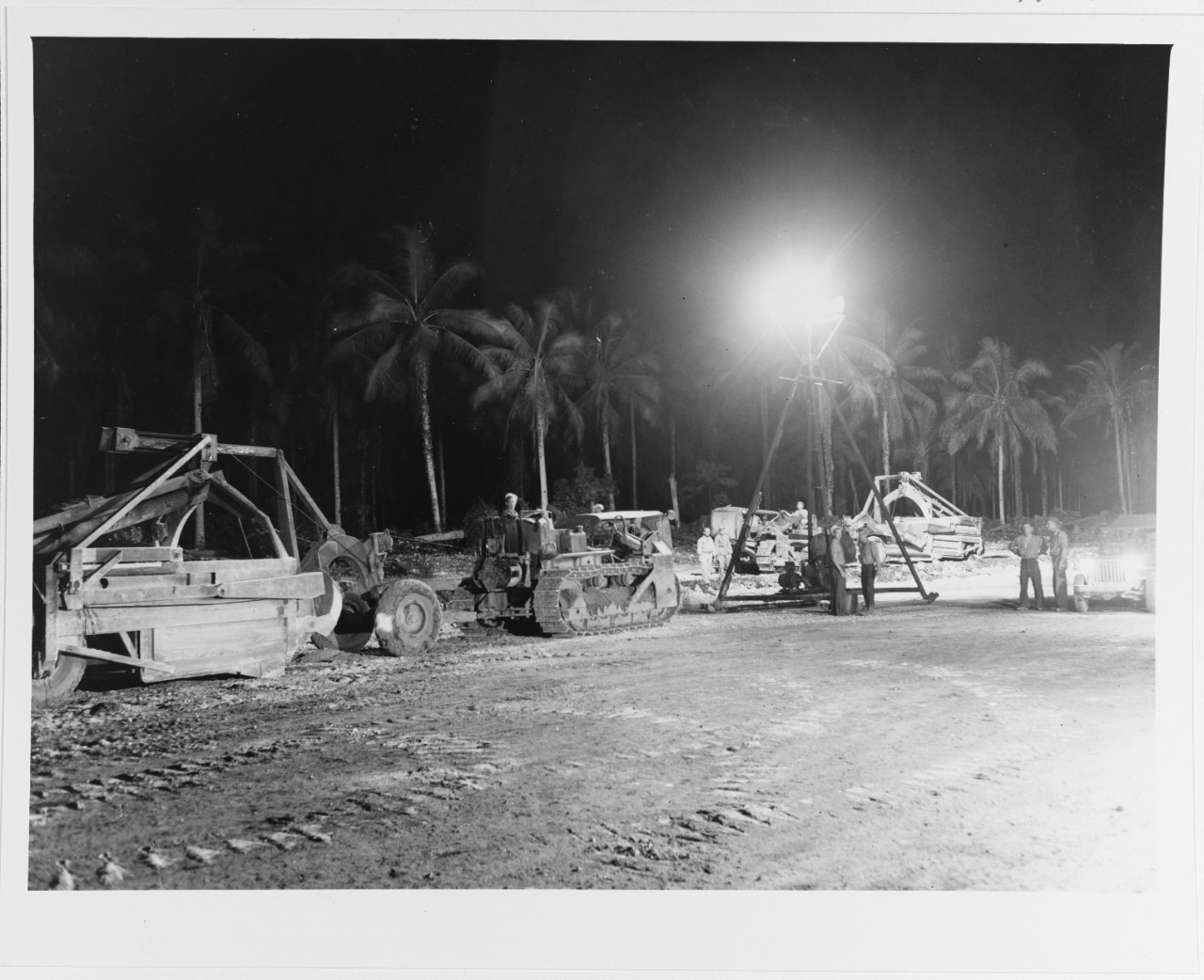
Momote Airfield with Seabees working at night in 1944. CB 40 worked day and night on the Los Negros Momote Airfield.

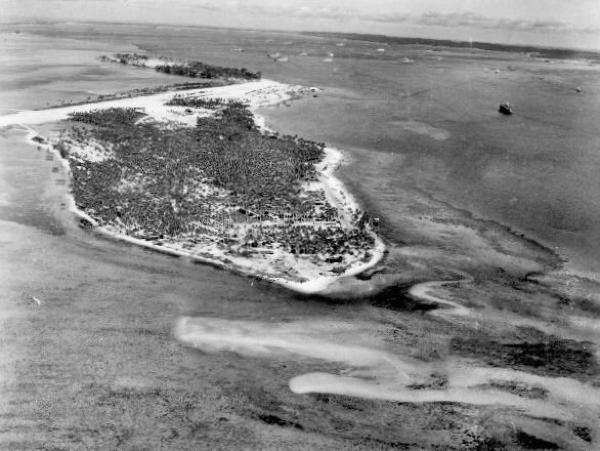
Pityilu Island with air base.

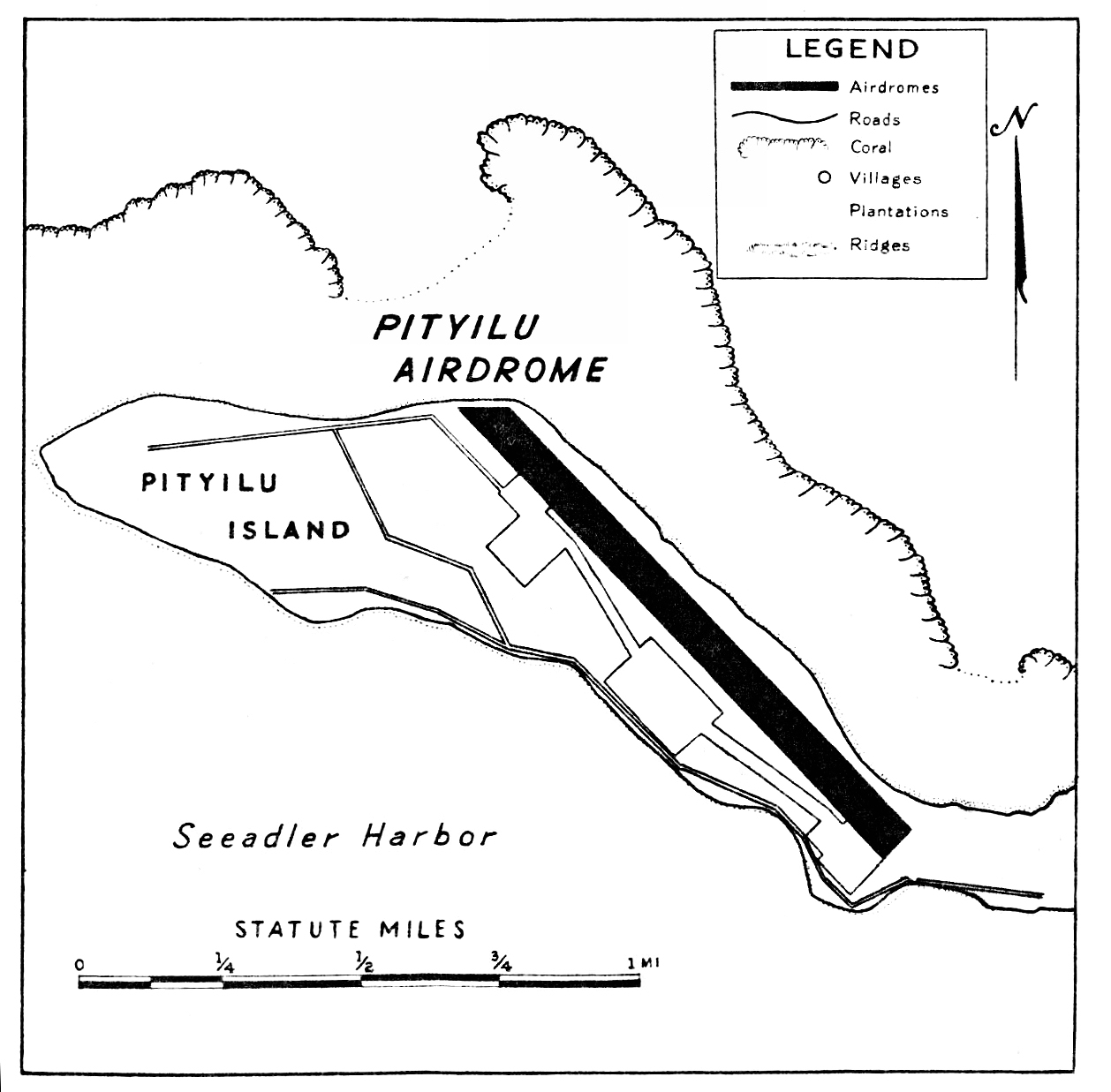
Map Pityilu Island with air base 1944

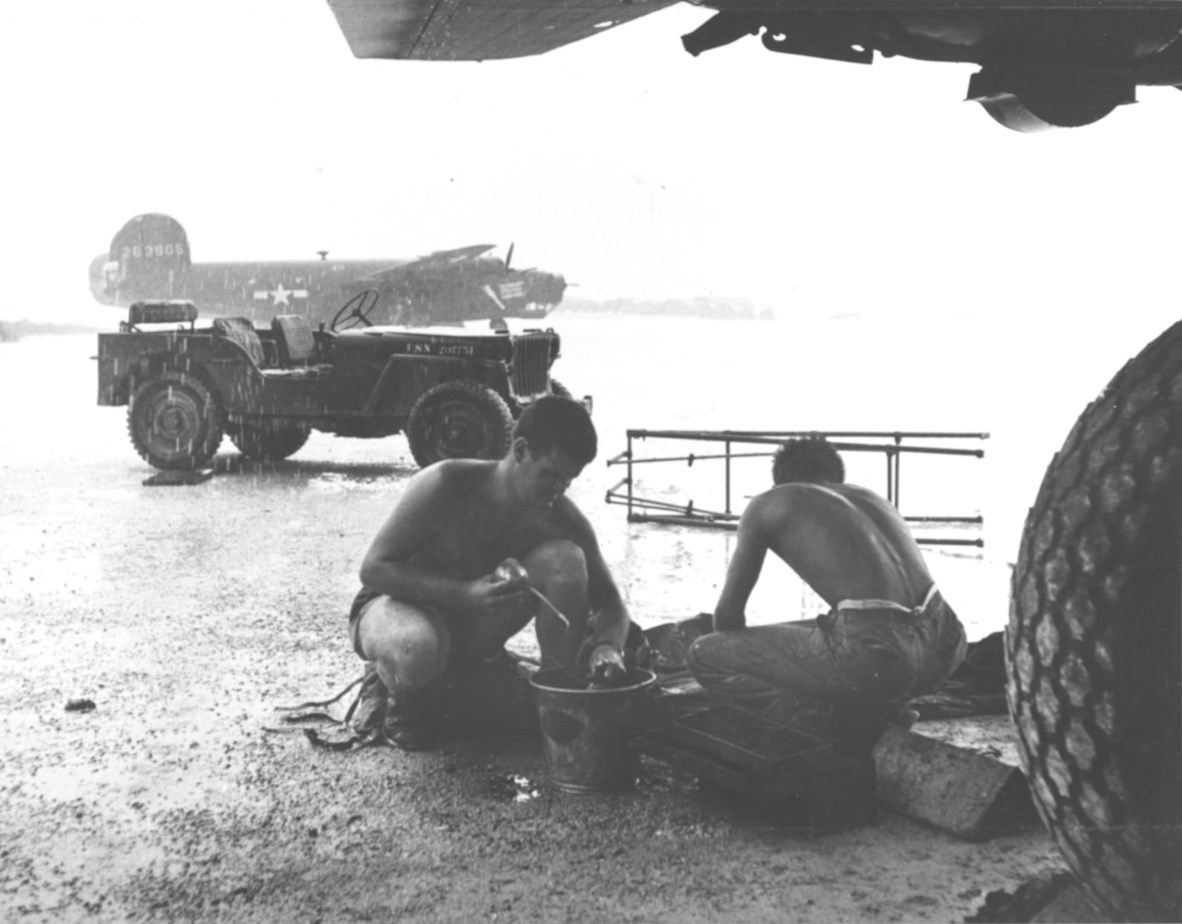
US Navy maintenance crews VB-106 clean engine parts under an airplane wing while raining at Momote Airstrip in March 1944

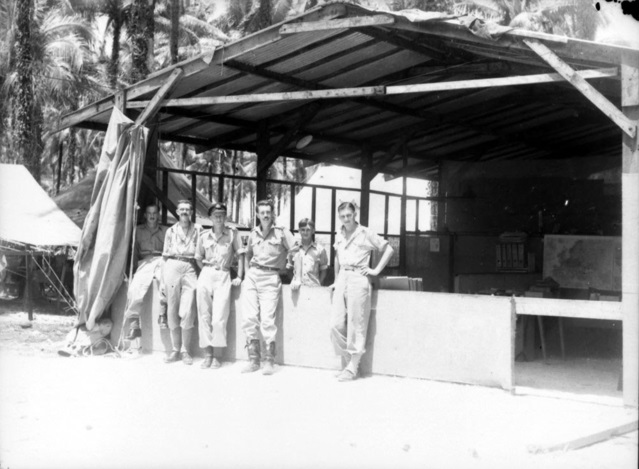
No. 71 Squadron RAAF on Los Negros base

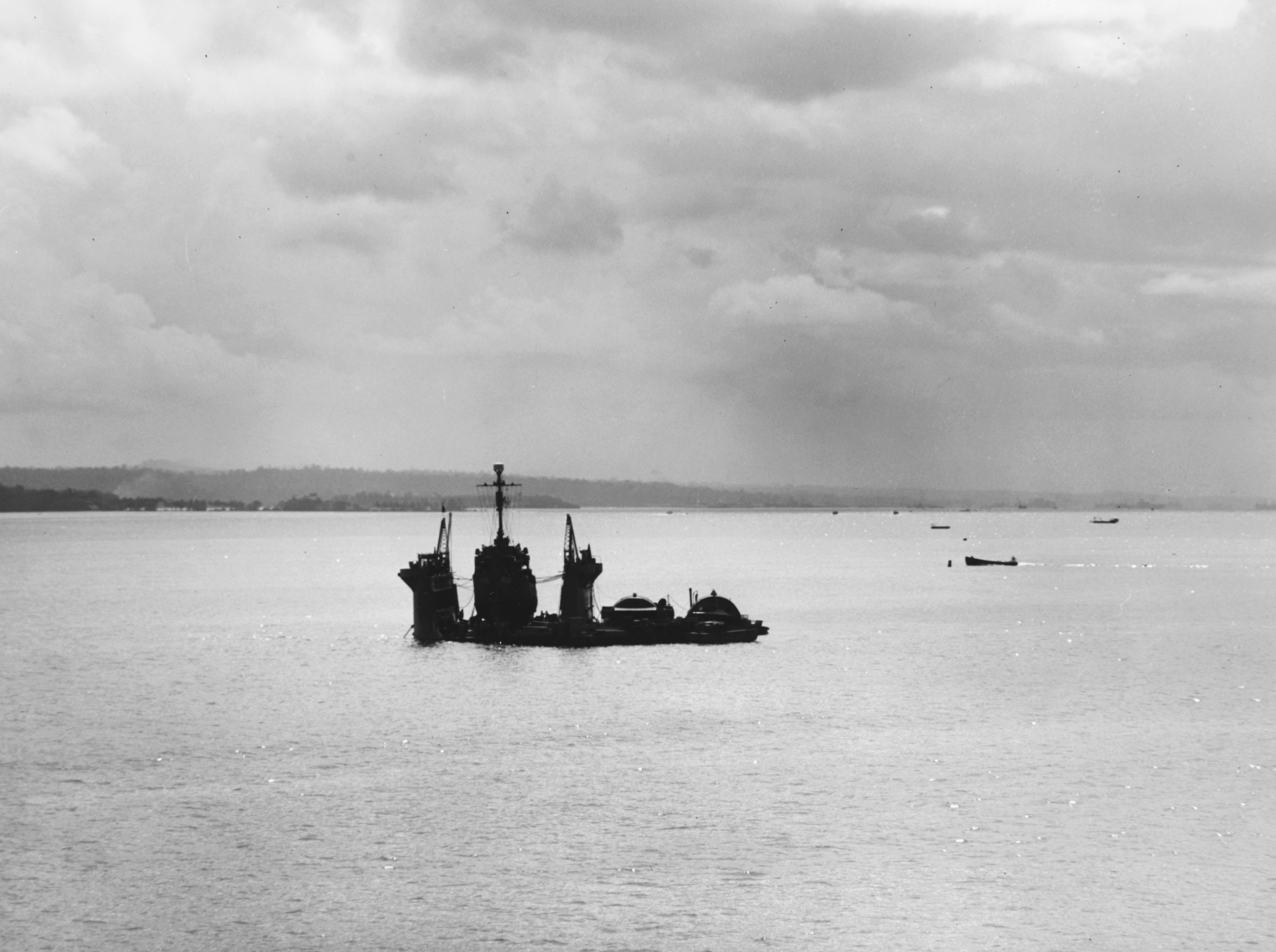
Small Auxiliary Floating Dry Dock, repairing submarine chaser PC-1121 at Seeadler Harbor in September 1944

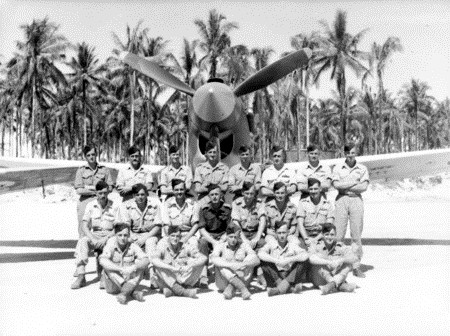
No. 76 Squadron RAAF

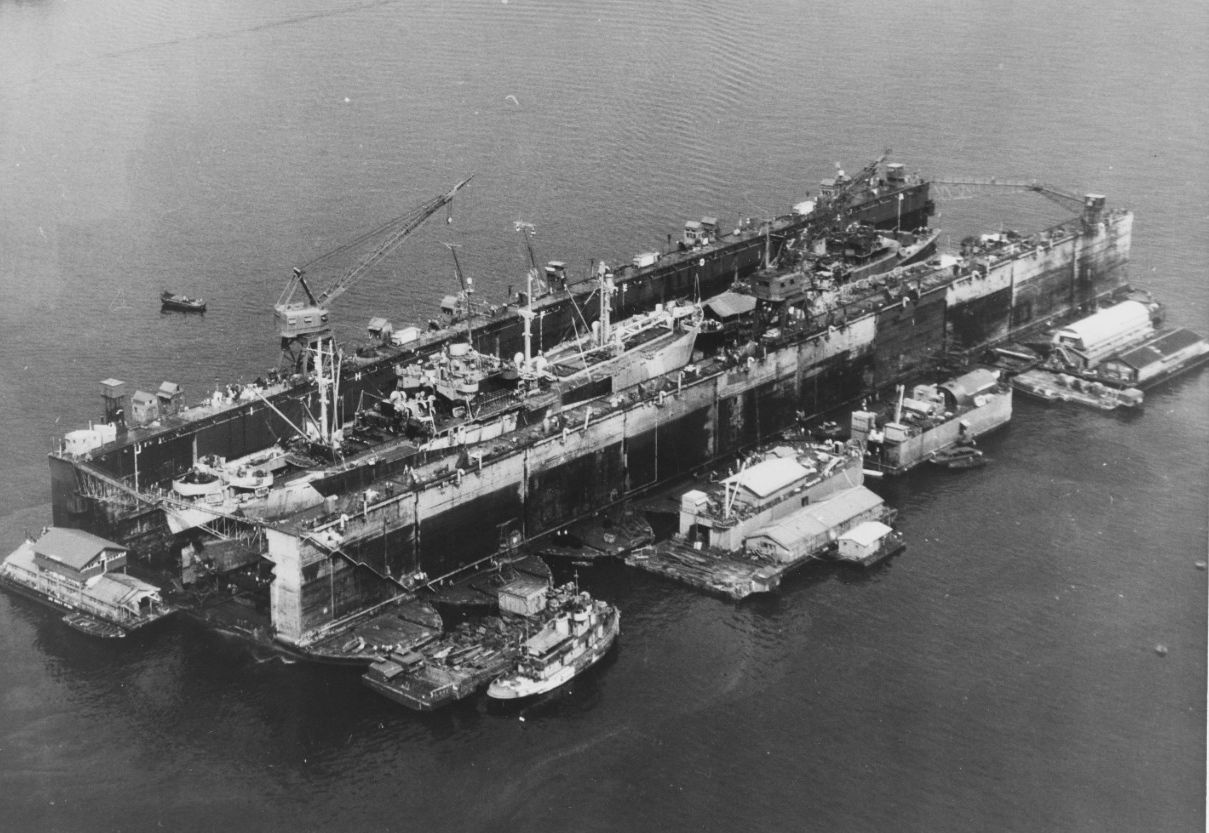
US Navy floating Dry Dock Number 4 in Seeadler Harbor 1945, surrounded by floating barges with workshops and a tugboat, repairing seaplane tender and Navy Liberty ship

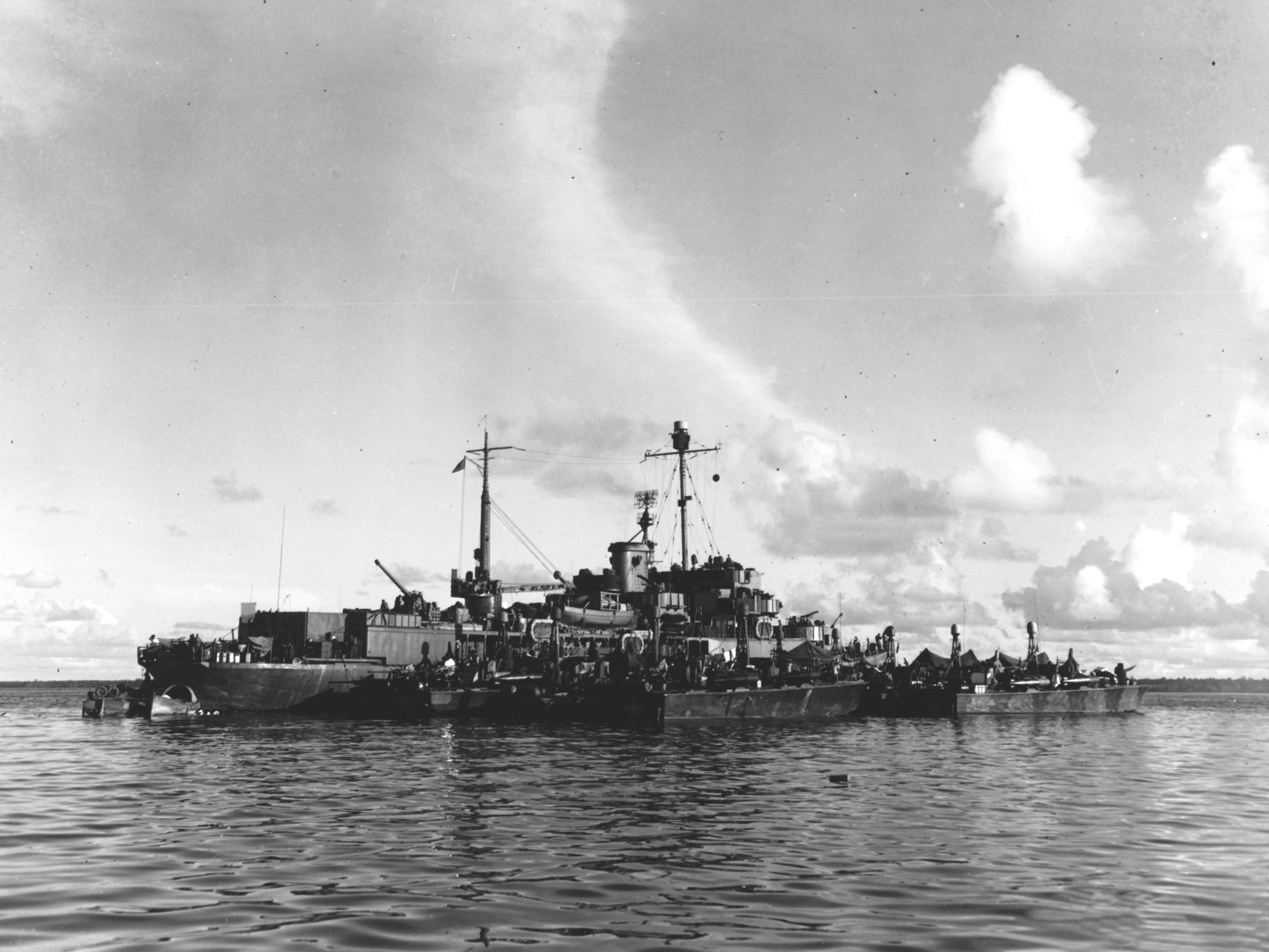
USS Oyster Bay (AGP-6) tending PT boats in Seeadler Harbor on March 25, 1944

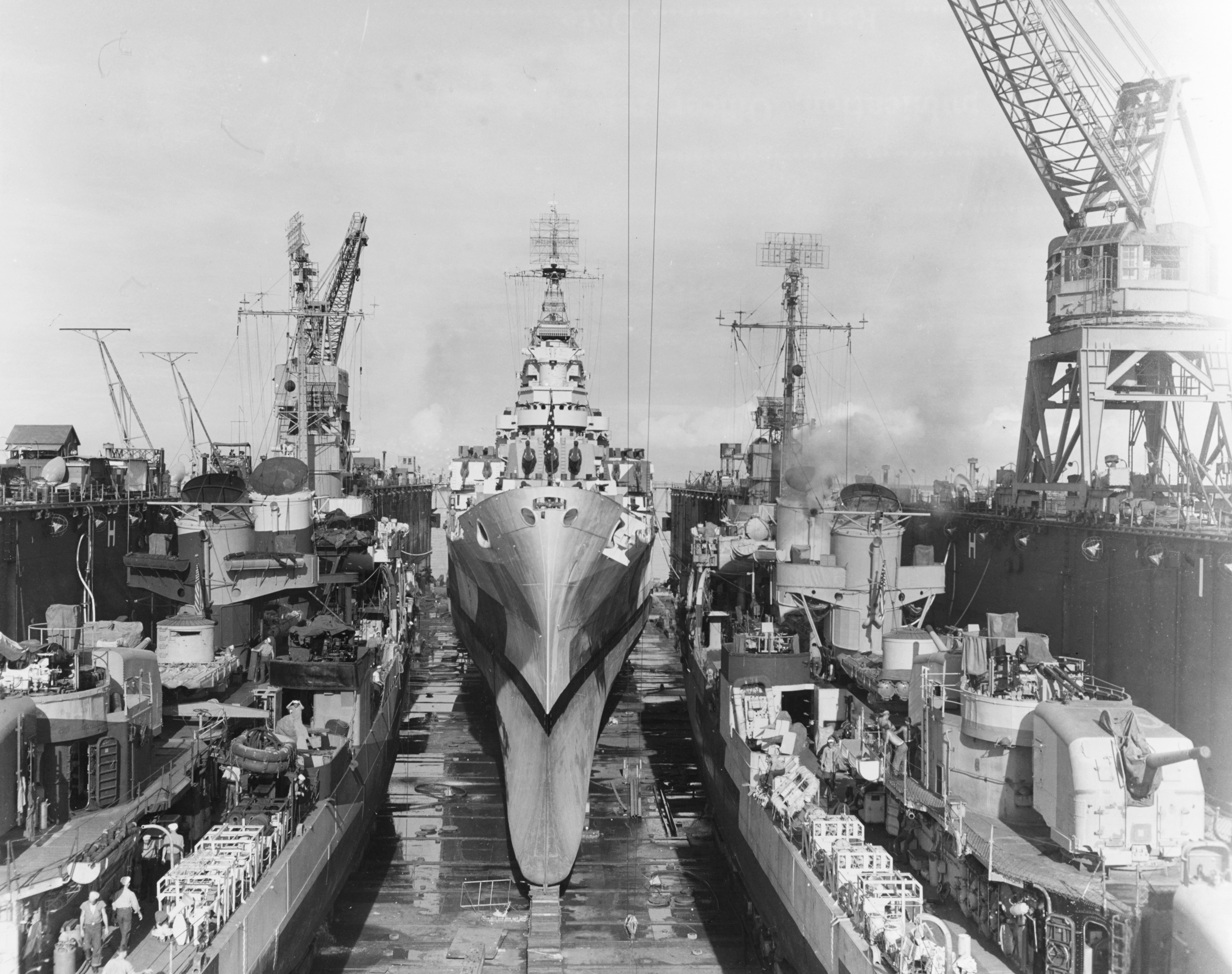
USS Claxton (DD-571), USS Canberra (CA-70) and USS Killen (DD-593) in floating dry dock ABSD-2 on 2 December 1944

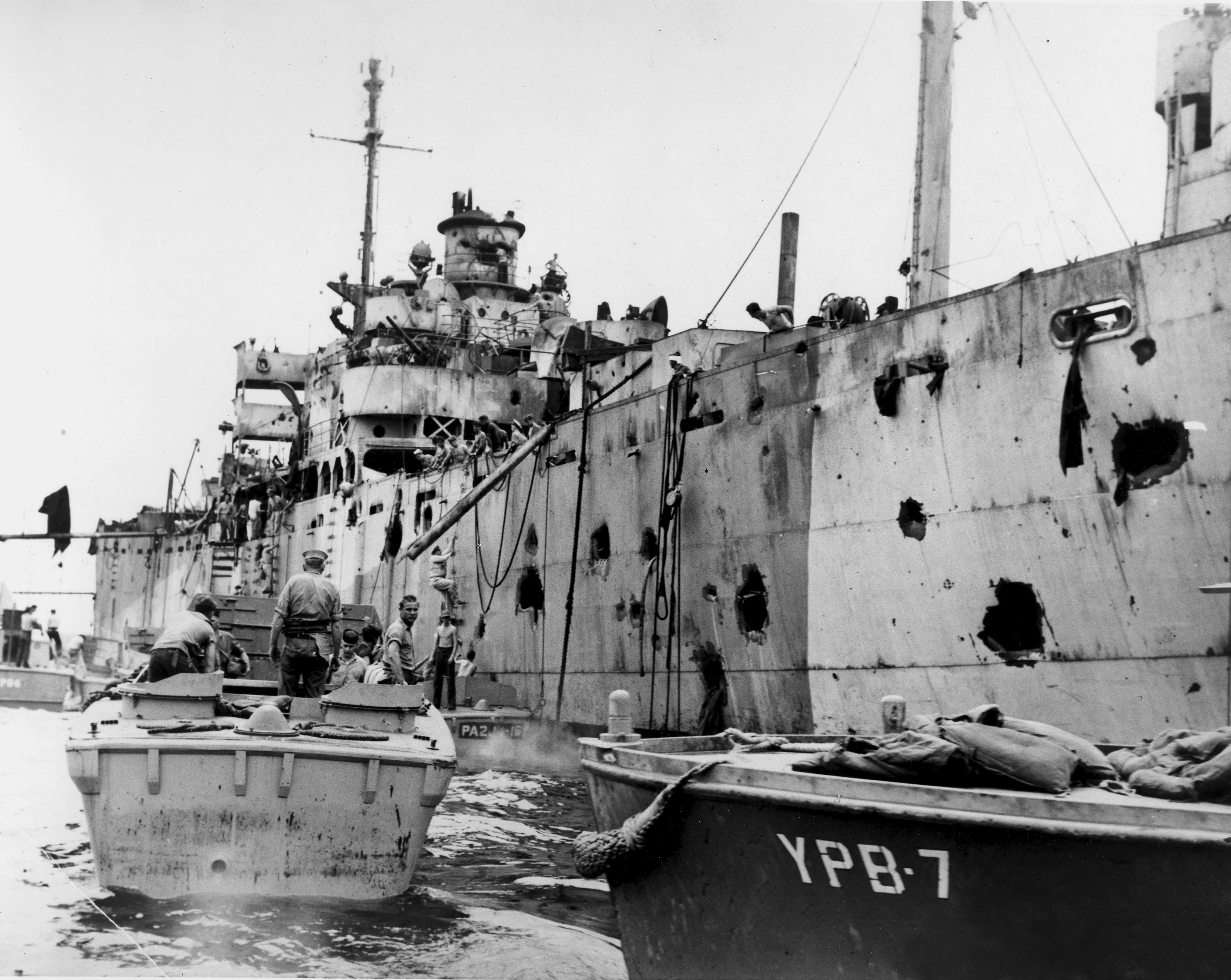
USS Mindanao (ARG-3) damaged by the explosion of USS Mount Hood (AE-11) in Seeadler Harbor on November 10, 1944

== See also ==
- U.S. Naval Base Subic Bay
- Espiritu Santo Naval Base
- US Naval Advance Bases
- Naval Advance Base Saipan
- Manus Regional Processing Centre
