= VP6 (disambiguation) =

VP6 is a video compression format owned by Google and created by On2 Technologies.

VP6 may also refer to:

- VP-6, Patrol Squadron 6, a maritime patrol squadron of the United States Navy
- VP6, a viral protein; for example in Rotavirus
