= VP-6 =

Patrol Squadron 6
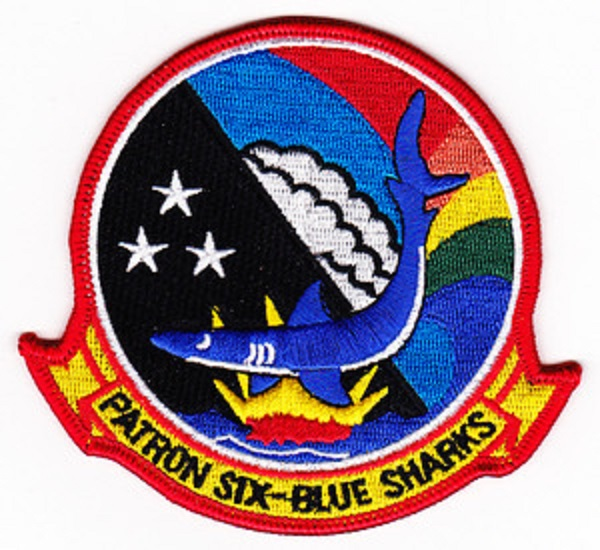
- VP-6 insignia 1987
- Active: 15 July 1943 – 31 May 1993
- Country: United States of America
- Branch: United States Navy
- Type: squadron
- Role: Maritime patrol
- Part of: United States Navy/Naval Air Forces/Patrol Wing
- Nickname(s): Mad Foxes; Blue Sharks
- Engagements: World War II; Korean War; Vietnam War

Aircraft flown
- Patrol: PV-1 Ventura; PV-2 Harpoon; P2 Neptune; P-3 Orion

VP-6 was a long-lived Patrol Squadron of the U.S. Navy, nicknamed the Blue Sharks. Originally established as Bombing Squadron VB-146 on 15 July 1943, it was redesignated Patrol Bombing Squadron VPB-146 on 1 October 1944, redesignated VP-146 on 15 May 1946, redesignated Medium Patrol Squadron (Landplane) VP-ML-6 on 15 November 1946, redesignated VP-6 on 1 September 1948 and disestablished on 31 May 1993. It was the third squadron to be designated VP-6, the first VP-6 was disestablished on 3 May 1926 and the second VP-6 was disestablished on 20 June 1945.

== Operational history ==
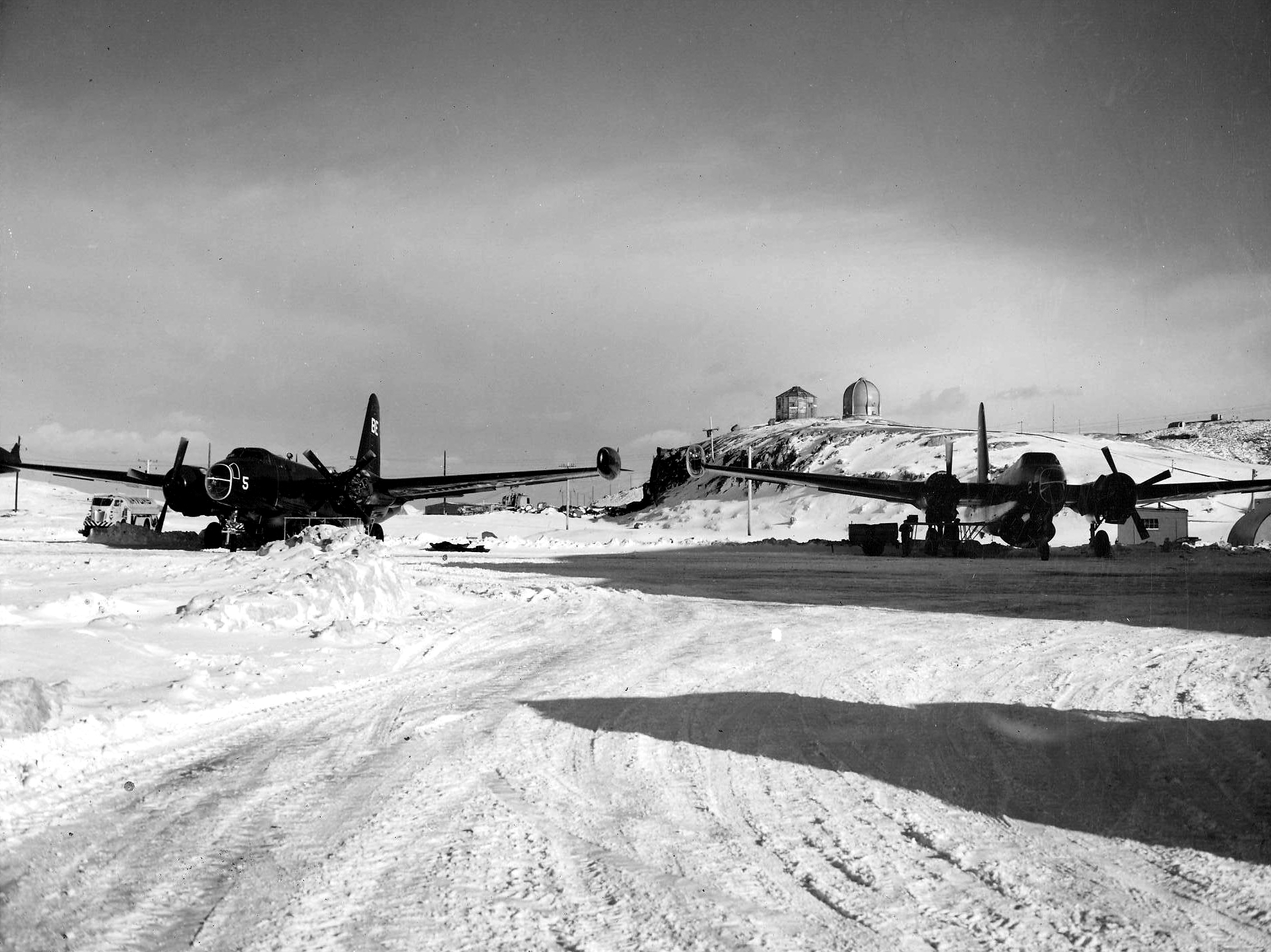
VP-6 P2V-5s at NAS Kodiak in 1954

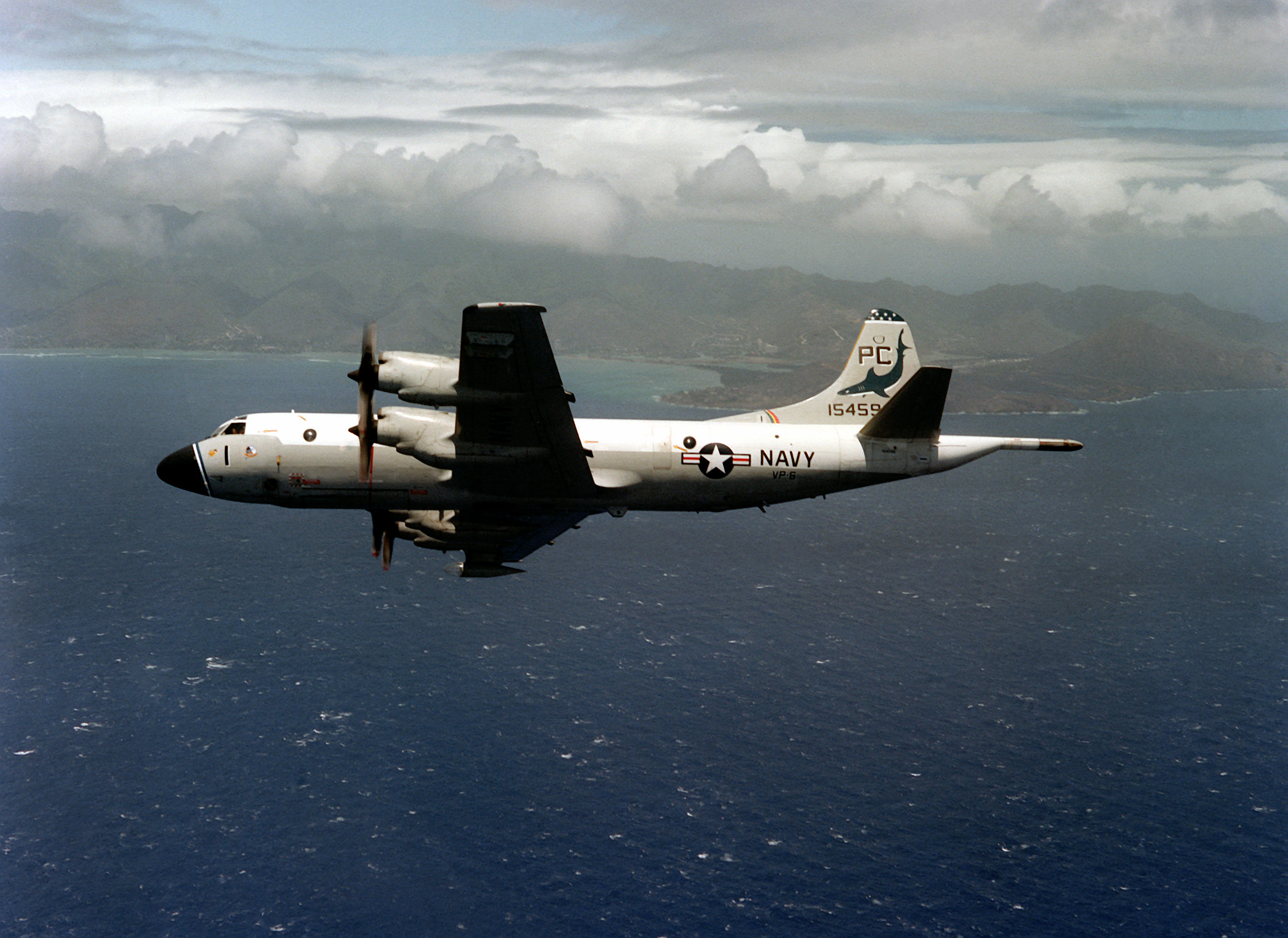
VP-6 P-3B off Oahu in 1978

- 15 July 1943: VB-146 was established at NAS Whidbey Island, Washington to fly the PV-1 Ventura. On 5 December 1943, the squadron moved to NAS Alameda, California, for final training prior to combat deployment. On 22 December all squadron aircraft, equipment and personnel were embarked aboard USS Coral Sea for conveyance to NAS Kaneohe Bay, Hawaii.
- 29 August 1943: Lieutenant Commander Ralph R. Beacham and his crew of five were lost between Bellingham and Everett, Washington, in inclement weather during a routine instrument training flight in a PV-1 (BuNo. 34637). A search for the aircraft was begun when it became overdue, but the dense tree cover in the mountains and poor visibility due to bad weather conditions prevented the search teams from finding the aircraft or crew.
- 28 December 1943: VB-146 commenced combat training while conducting actual wartime patrols off the coasts of the Hawaiian islands, convoy patrol duties in the Central Pacific and advanced base patrols from Midway Island and Johnston Atoll.
- 9 April 1944: VB-146 aircrews received training in air-to-ground rocket firing and advanced Anti-submarine warfare (ASW) techniques.
- 8 June 1944: The squadron was deployed to the South Pacific area of the Admiralty Islands, conducting combat operations from Palmyra, Kanton, Funafuti, Espiritu Santo and Pityilu. On 24 June, while based at Pityilu Island, the squadron was placed under Task Force 70.2 for operational control.
- 19 October 1944: VPB-146 deployed to Morotoi to conduct sector searches and strikes on Japanese shipping.
- 1 December 1944: VPB-146 deployed to Mokerang Airfield, Los Negros Island. Duties included 800 miles (1,300 km) search sectors, ASW patrol and antishipping missions in support of the Morotoi landings and the Leyte, Philippines occupation. Upon arrival at Mokerang one half of the squadron personnel were given R&R to Australia.
- 18 February 1945: VPB-146 departed the combat zone for return to NAS Kaneohe Bay, and on to NAS San Diego, California.
- 15 April 1945: VPB-146 was reformed and commenced familiarization training on the new PV-2 Harpoon at NAS Moffett Field, California.
- September 1946: Orders were received for deployment to Naval Base Pearl Harbor, Hawaii. The squadron arrived on 2 October 1946, and was stationed at NAS Barbers Point. Over the next several months duties consisted of search and ASW exercises with the fleet.
- 7 November 1946: A detachment of squadron aircraft was sent to NAS Alameda, for deployment to Mexico City to participate in an air demonstration for the presidential inauguration ceremonies. Upon completion of the detail, the detachment ferried PV-2s to NAS Quonset Point, Rhode Island, before returning to NAS Barbers Point on 13 December 1946.
- 12 December 1947: VP-ML-6 was notified of a change in permanent home base to NAS Whidbey Island, Washington. The first elements of squadron personnel boarded USS Suisan for return to the continental United States on 12 January 1948. The squadron officially detached from FAW-2 on 30 January 1948.
- 30 January 1948: VP-ML-6 began transition training to the P2V-2 Neptune at NAAS Miramar, California.
- April 1950: New P2V-3 and P2V-3N aircraft were received as replacements for the older P2V-2 aircraft flown by the squadron.
- 28 June 1950 – 12 February 1951: VP-6 deployed to Korea as the first patrol squadron in the theater of operations, and the first to fly the P2V Neptune in combat. During this tour the squadron operated from Johnson AFB, Japan from 7 July–6 August 1950; from Tachikawa Air Base, Japan, from 6 August 1950 – 12 February 1951; and a detachment at NAS Atsugi, Japan, from 5 January–12 February 1951. Patrols were flown over the Yellow Sea and Sea of Japan, and in support of the Inchon landings.
- 29 July 1950: Two squadron P2V-3s, piloted by Lieutenant Commander R. L. Ettinger and Lieutenant William J. Pressler, sighted a train along the Korean coast near Chongjin. The two crews destroyed the train with 5-inch rockets and 20-mm bow guns.
- 13 August 1950: Two squadron Neptunes, led by Lieutenant Command E. B. Rogers, attacked several boats and barges engaged in minelaying near Chinnampo. Three boats and two barges were sunk. Roger's P2V was holed six times by enemy fire. On the same day, other VP-6 aircraft damaged two surface craft near Wonsan.
- 16 August 1950: A squadron P2V piloted by Ensign William F. Goodman, attacked an enemy patrol vessel near Chinnampo. The starboard engine of his aircraft was damaged by enemy fire and was ditched near the enemy shoreline. The entire crew was rescued by the Royal Navy cruiser HMS Kenya. As a result of this loss, patrol aircraft were no longer assigned attack missions in Korea. 1 Aug 1951: During the squadron's second combat deployment to Korea it moved to NAF Naha, Okinawa, to conduct aerial reconnaissance off the China Coast under the operational control of FAW-1.
- 6 November 1951: A squadron P2V-3W was shot down with the loss of all hands (10 aircrewmen) by Russian fighter aircraft while on patrol in the Sea of Japan off Vladisvostok, Siberia. BuNo 124284 was conducting a weather reconnaissance mission under United Nations command. The attack occurred over international waters, but the Russians claimed the aircraft had violated Soviet airspace over Cape Ostrovnaya.
- 7 July 1952: VP-6 departed Hawaii for NAS Kodiak, Alaska. Detachments were maintained at Ladd AFB from 14 August–17 September and at NAS Adak from 10 to 20 December 1952, in support of the Cold Weather Advance Base exercise.
- November 1957: In November VP-6 participated in the search for Pan Am Flight 7, lost in the western Pacific. The futile search for survivors was the largest air-sea rescue operation ever conducted in the Pacific.
- July 1962: VP-6 flew 1,000 hours during operations at Johnston Atoll in conjunction with testing of nuclear devices. Air samples were collected in the zone near the test site and downwind to check on radioactivity and particle dispersion.
- April 1962: A squadron Neptune, flown by Lieutenant Commander G. L. Page, ditched in the Sea of Japan after both reciprocating engines experienced mechanical problems and were feathered. The ditching was smoothly executed and the crew was picked up within minutes with no injuries.
- 9 August 1964: VP-6 participated in the response to the Gulf of Tonkin Incident with the Seventh Fleet, in waters off Vietnam. The squadron flew surveillance and ASW patrols over the Gulf of Tonkin and the South China Sea during this period. VP-6 was based at NAF Naha, Okinawa, on 18 August 1964, relieving VP-17. A detachment was maintained at NAS Cubi Point, Philippines. A few months later VP-6 was transferred to MCAS Iwakuni, Japan, where it was relieved in January by VP-2.
- 15 August 1967: VP-6 were the first patrol squadron at NAS Barbers Point to receive AGM-12 Bullpup missiles for the P-3A Orion. The small missile was carried under the wing of the P-3A, and was intended for airto-surface attacks against small targets ashore and afloat.
- 1 January 1968: The squadron deployed to WestPac based at NAF Naha, Okinawa, with a detachment at NS Sangley Point, Philippines, and NAF Cam Ranh Bay, South Vietnam. During the deployment VP-6 conducted its first patrols over a combat zone since the Korean War.
- 5 April 1968: A squadron aircraft, BuNo. 151350, crashed on patrol over the China Sea with 12 aboard 8 lost 4 survivors [Navy Aircraft Accident Report]
- 1 June 1969: VP-6 deployed to NS Sangley Point, with a detachment at U-Tapao Royal Thai Navy Airfield, Thailand.
- 14 July 1970: The squadron deployed to NAF Naha, Okinawa, in support of Seventh Fleet operations off the sea lane approaches to North Vietnam.
- 12 May 1971: A squadron P-3A (BuNo. 152151) crashed shortly after takeoff from NAS Cubi Point. All four engines had failed because cleaning fluid had been mistakenly substituted for water-injection fluid.
- 21 September 1971: VP-6 deployed to NAS Cubi Point in support of the Seventh Fleet operations in WestPac. A detachment was maintained at NAF Cam Ranh Bay. Missions were generally flown throughout South China Sea and off the coast of Vietnam. Operations during this period concentrated on Vietnamese infiltrator trawler interceptions.
- 30 November 1972: The squadron was again deployed to WestPac based at NAF Naha, with a detachment at U-Tapao, Thailand. The deployment marked the last for the squadron in the Vietnamese theatre of operations.
- August 1975: VP-6 was the first squadron to deploy a detachment to NAS Agana, Guam, with the P-3B. The three-aircraft/four-crew detachment remained until March 1976.
- August 1977: Upon return from its 1976–1977 deployment, the squadron began the update program from the P-3B to the P-3B TAC/NAV MOD Super Bee. The retrofits to the P-3B airframes included more powerful engines, improved navigation equipment and upgraded avionics.
- May 1978: VP-6 returned to NAS Cubi Point and became the first of the patrol squadrons to deploy the P-3B MOD aircraft. During this assignment the squadron visited Australia, Kenya, Djibouti and Japan. A detachment was also maintained throughout the deployment on the island of Diego Garcia.
- June 1979: VP-6 deployed a detachment to NAS Agana, Guam, for ASW coverage, Mariana Islands surveillance flights and routine training missions. During this period the detachment assisted in support of refugee rescue operations flown from NAS Cubi Point, aiding in the recovery of over 500 Vietnamese boat people.
- 5 September 1980: A VP-6 Orion, BuNo. 154591, made a wheels up landing at Lihue Airport Kauai. One crewman was injured, with extensive damage to the aircraft.
- November 1980: The squadron deployed to NAS Cubi Point as the first Pacific fleet squadron to deploy with full Harpoon missile capabilities. Throughout the deployment a detachment was maintained on the island of Diego Garcia.
- February 1982: VP-6 deployed to NAS Agana, during this period the squadron aircraft visited numerous Southeast Asia countries. In the last two months of the tour, the squadron was deployed to NAS Adak for a period of intense ASW operations against Soviet submarines in the northern Pacific.
- May 1983: VP-6 deployed to NAS Cubi Point.
- November 1984: VP-6 deployed to NAS Cubi Point.
- 10 May 1986: VP-6 deployed to NAS Cubi Point and Misawa, Japan.
- 1 December 1987: VP-6 deployed to Adak while monitoring Soviet submarine movement and air defense reactions.
- June – September 1988: VP-6 was placed in "Cold Iron" status due to fiscal constraints. The standdown permitted only the bare minimum of maintenance required to preserve the aircraft, but did not allow for sufficient flying time to retain top crew proficiency. As a result of the standdown aircrew proficiency was graded unsatisfactory on the COMNAVAIRPAC Naval Aviation Training and Procedures Standardization (NATOPS) inspection conducted 26–30 September 1988.
- 1 May 1989: VP-6 deployed to NAS Cubi Point and Diego Garcia where crews performed detachments to Darwin, Brunei, Masirah, Djibouti and Mauritius.
- February 1990: VP-6 became the first patrol squadron at NAS Barbers Point to receive the first P-3C Update II.5 aircraft. This update had improved electronics systems, new IACS (Integrated Acoustic Communication System), improved MAD, standardized wing pylons and improved wing fuel tank venting.
- 4 December 1990: VP-6 deployed to Adak.
- 5 December 1991: VP-6 deployed to Panama.
- 10 June 1992: VP-6 went on their last deployment to NAF Misawa, Japan, to participate in Operation Final Frenzy, a SEATO exercise with U.S. and allied nations providing surveillance and ASW coverage. Exercises took the squadron from the Persian Gulf to Australia and involved allies from Korea, Japan, Malaysia, Singapore and Hong Kong.
- 31 May 1993: VP-6 was disestablished at NAS Barbers Point.
- 15 October 1995: A hiker spotted the burned and shattered remains of an aircraft in a remote area usually covered by snow near Mount Baker in northwestern Washington. It was the remains of the PV-1 Ventura belonging to VB-146 flown by Lieutenant Commander Ralph R. Beacham, missing since 29 August 1943. A Navy Recovery Team removed the remains of the two officers and four enlisted crewmen for positive identification and notification of next of kin.

== Home port assignments ==
The squadron was assigned to these home ports, effective on the dates shown:

- NAS Whidbey Island, Washington 15 July 1943
- NAS Kaneohe, Hawaii 28 December 1943
- NAS Moffett Field, California 15 April 1945
- NAS Alameda, California 30 July 1945
- NAS Barbers Point, Hawaii 2 October 1946
- NAS Whidbey Island 30 January 1948
- NAS Barbers Point, Hawaii 1 May 1949

== Aircraft assignment ==
The squadron first received the following aircraft on the dates shown:

- PV-1 July 1943
- PV-2 April 1945
- P2V-2 February 1948
- P2V-3/P2V-3W April 1950
- P2V-5 February 1954
- P2V-5F March 1955
- SP-2E Mod II May 1962
- P-3A 1965
- P-3B November 1974
- P-3B MOD December 1977
- P-3C UII.5 January 1990

== Unit Awards ==

Navy Unit Commendation w/ 2 service stars:
Navy Meritorious Unit Commendation w/ 8 service stars	Coast Guard Meritorious Unit Commendation w/ Operational Distinguishing Device	National Defense Service Medal w/ 2 service stars
Armed Forces Expeditionary Medal w/ 1 service star	Coast Guard Special Operations Service Ribbon	Republic of Vietnam Gallantry Cross Unit Citation with Palm (2 awards)

== See also ==
- Maritime patrol aircraft
- List of Lockheed P-3 Orion variants
- Squadron (aviation)
- Naval aviation
- List of inactive United States Navy aircraft squadrons
- List of United States Navy aircraft squadrons
- List of squadrons in the Dictionary of American Naval Aviation Squadrons
- History of the United States Navy
