= VP-2 =

Patrol Squadron 2
- Active: 1 March 1943 – 30 September 1969
- Country: United States of America
- Branch: United States Navy
- Type: squadron
- Role: Maritime patrol
- Engagements: World War II; Korean War; Vietnam War

Aircraft flown
- Patrol: PV-1/2; P2V/SP-2H

VP-2 was a Patrol Squadron of the United States Navy. The squadron was established as Bombing Squadron 130 (VB-130) on 1 March 1943, redesignated Patrol Bombing Squadron 130 (VPB-130) on 1 October 1944, redesignated Patrol Squadron 130 (VP-130) on 15 May 1946, redesignated Medium Patrol Squadron (Landplane) 3 (VP-ML-2) on 15 November 1946, redesignated Patrol Squadron 2 (VP-2) on 1 September 1948 and disestablished on 30 September 1969. It was the second squadron to be designated VP-2, the first VP-2 was redesignated VP-31 on 1 July 1939.

== Operational history ==
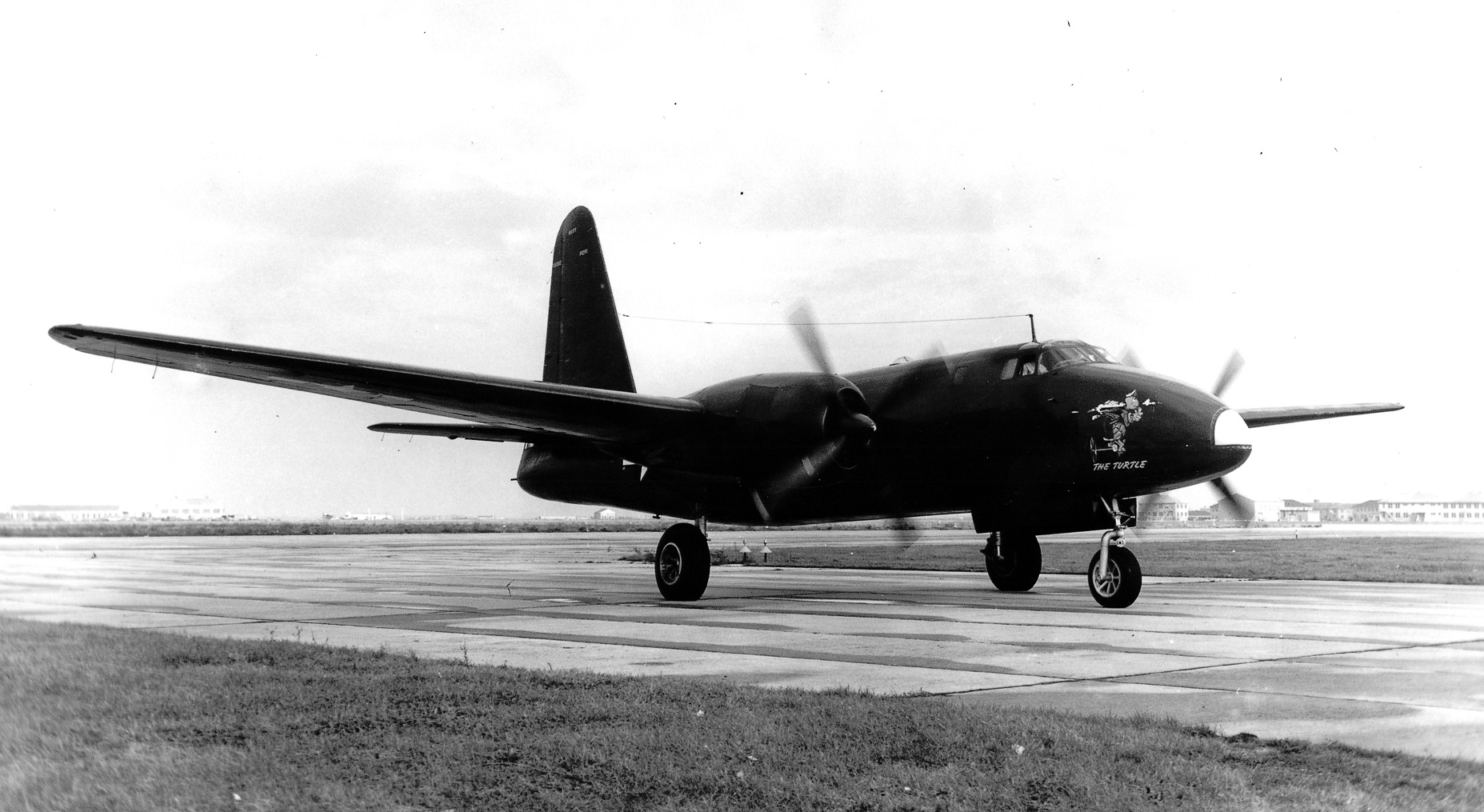
VP-130's The Truculent Turtle in 1946

- 3 March 1943: VB-130 was established at NAS DeLand, Florida. Organization and training of squadron personnel took place over the next two and a half months, followed on 17 May 1943 by shake-down training flying the PV-1 Ventura at NAS Boca Chica, Florida.
- 7 June 1943: The squadron deployed to NAS San Juan, Puerto Rico, to provide convoy protection and anti-submarine warfare (ASW) protection in Caribbean waters.
- 16 June 1943, the squadron was relocated to Edinburgh Field, Trinidad, to continue convoy protection and ASW patrols.
- 6 August 1943: Lieutenant Holmes and his crew sank the German navy submarine, U-615. The submarine was caught on the surface in the Caribbean southeast of Curaçao and damaged badly enough by the bombs to prevent it from submerging. Unable to escape, the German crew scuttled the vessel. Forty-five of the U-boat’s crew of 49 were rescued by U.S. Navy vessels.
- 12–27 August 1943: The squadron moved to Recife, Brazil, where it remained until 27 August 1943, when it was shifted again to Pici Field, Fortaleza. ASW patrols and convoy coverage were the primary activities of the squadron during the next eight months.
- 30 April 1944: VB-130 was relieved by VB-134 and returned to NAS Norfolk, Virginia for home leave.
- 3 June 1944: The squadron was reequipped with rocket launchers. Ground attack training using rockets took place over the next 30 days.
- 3 July 1944: VB-130 began ferry operations to shift equipment, personnel and aircraft from NAS Norfolk to NAS Alameda, California On 6 August 1944 the squadron boarded USS Shipley Bay for transfer to NAS Kaneohe Bay, Hawaii, arriving on 13 August 1944.
- 10 Oct 1944: VPB-130 transferred to Ponam Island, Admiralty Islands. Training continued along with operational ASW and antishipping patrols.
- 1 November 1944: VPB-130 began transferring its assets and personnel to Tacloban in the Philippine Islands, via Owi Airfield, Peleliu Airfield, Palau and Morotai. Squadron aircraft arrived on 6 November 1944, and were placed under the tactical control of the 308th Bomb Wing of the United States Army Air Forces Fifth Air Force. Through April 1945, the squadron undertook a variety of missions in conjunction with 13th Army Air Force operations. Detachments operating from Morotai and Owi Island conducted 300 miles (480 km) to 600 miles (970 km) sector searches. The remainder of the squadron at Tacloban conducted 1,000 miles (1,600 km) sector searches. Numerous attacks were made on Japanese island installations, radar sites, airfields and small ships.
- 24 April 1945: VPB-130 transferred to Manus Island, where all personnel boarded USS Kadashan Bay on 1 May 1945 for return to the continental United States, where home leave was given to all hands.
- 31 August 1945: VPB-130 was reformed at Ault Field, NAS Whidbey Island, Washington, and training of personnel commenced utilizing new aircraft, the PV-2 Harpoon.
- 29 September 1946: The Truculent Turtle the squadron’s first P2V-1 Neptune land-based patrol bomber, flew from Perth, Australia, to Columbus, Ohio, a distance of 11,236 miles (18,083 km) in 55 hours and 18 minutes. The aircraft (BuNo 89082) was manned by Commanders Thomas D. Davies, Eugene P. Rankin, Walter S. Reid and Lieutenant Commander Roy H. Tabeling. The flight was nonstop, without refueling, establishing a world record for nonstop flight. When the aircraft was taken out of service years later, it was placed on display at NAS Norfolk. This aircraft is now on display at the National Naval Aviation Museum, NAS Pensacola, Florida.
- March 1947: VP-ML-2 began receiving the rest of its complement of P2V-1s, these replacements for the PV-2 Harpoons marked the beginning of an intense period of ASW training for all squadron personnel.
- 5 June 1950: VP-2 was assigned a tour in Alaska for cold-weather operational training. The squadron provided resupply missions for the Oceanographic Survey being conducted in Alaskan waters.
- 1 August 1951: A detachment of VP-2 flying P2V-3Ws deployed to NAF Naha, Okinawa, to patrol the East China Sea and Yellow Sea in the Korean theater of operations. The detachment remained in the combat zone until December 1951, this was squadron’s first and last involvement in the Korean War.
- 1 September 1951: VP-2 became the first squadron to receive the new P2V-4 with the Wright Aero R-3350W compound-turbo engine. Testing of the new engines was performed onsite at NAS Whidbey Island, without missing deployments. Detachments during this period were assigned to NAS Kodiak, Alaska, and NAF Naha.
- 2 January 1954 to 10 July 1954: VP-2 Squadron departed NAS Whidbey Island and deployed to MCAS Iwakuni, Japan with nine P2V-5 Neptunes relieving VP-7 on 4 January. During the deployment the following flights were flown: 63 Primary ECM; 51 primary shipping surveillance; 52 Tsushima Strait patrols; 75 Task Force 77 ASP. A total of 2021 flight hours logged on operational flights. Two Neptunes reported attacks by MiG-15 fighter aircraft over the Yellow Sea with no damaged observed to either aircraft and one Neptune lost while on a secret mission carried out over the Yellow Sea near the coast of Port Arthur, China. This is the only aircraft in VP-2 Squadron’s 22 year history to be lost in a combat zone.
- 4 January 1954: a U.S. Navy P2V-5 Neptune (BuNo 127752) of VP-2 departed MCAS Iwakuni for a secret combat reconnaissance mission and headed toward China. The flight was established on station over the Yellow Sea when it reported engine difficulties and "WE NEED AID". The engine difficulties and request for aid most likely the result of a hostile attack on the Neptune. The aircraft reached the vicinity of K-13 air base at Suwan before crashing. The crew of Jesse Beasley, Fredric Prael, Rex Claussen, Gordon Spickelmier, Lloyd Rensink, Bruce Burger, James Hand, Robert Archbold, Stanley Mulford and Paul Morelli were all killed. At least two members of the crew successfully exited the stricken Neptune by parachute but died 6 January of exposure while awaiting rescue. In 2005 the crew was awarded the Navy Combat Action Ribbons and Purple Hearts, classified as FALLEN. In addition The Republic of South Korea bestowed the Korean Presidential Unit Citation and Korean War Service Medal.
- 9 April 1954: A Neptune from VP-2 was attacked by a Chinese MiG-15 while on patrol over the Yellow Sea. The MiG made three firing passes and the crew of the Neptune returned fire. There was no apparent damage to either aircraft resulting from the encounter.
- 30 November 1964: VP-2 took first place among the United States Pacific Fleet squadrons in bombing, mining and rocket competition despite instrument flying conditions during 90 percent of the competition period.
- 25 Jan 1965: VP-2 relieved VP-6 for a six-month deployment at MCAS Iwakuni. Squadron detachments were assigned to Naha; NAS Sangley Point, Philippines; Taiwan; Bangkok; and Da Nang Air Base and Tan Son Nhut Air Base, South Vietnam. The last three months of the squadron’s WestPac tour were the squadron’s first tour in a combat zone since World War II.
- 1 April 1966: VP-2 relieved VP-42 for a six-month WestPac deployment at Iwakuni. Four months of the tour were spent at Tan Son Nhut Air Base.
- 1 October 1967: VP-2 deployed to WestPac with half of the squadron at NAS Sangley Point and a six-aircraft detachment at Tan Son Nhut Air Base. The detachment at Ton Son Nhut moved a few weeks later to Cam Ranh Bay Air Base.
- 17 February 1969: The squadron conducted its last deployment, its fourth to the Vietnam theater of operations, based at NAS Sangley Point.
- 30 September 1969: VP-2 was disestablished at NAS Whidbey Island.

== Aircraft assignments ==
The squadron was assigned the following aircraft, effective on the dates shown:

- PV-1 - 1 March 1943
- PV-2 - 31 August 1945
- P2V-1 - March 1947
- P2V-3/3W - November 1948
- P2V-4 - September 1951
- P2V-5 - 1952
- P2V-7 - 1955
- SP-2H - 1963

== Home port assignments ==
The squadron was assigned to these home ports, effective on the dates shown:

- NAS DeLand, Florida - 1 March 1943
- NAS Boca Chica, Florida - 17 May 1943
- Edinburgh Field, Trinidad - 16 June 1943
- Pici Field, Fortaleza, Brazil - 27 August 1943
- NAS Norfolk, Virginia - 30 April 1944
- NAS Alameda, California - 3 July 1944
- NAS Kaneohe Bay, Hawaii - 13 August 1944
- NAS Whidbey Island, Washington - 31 August 1945
- NAS Miramar, California - March 1947
- NAS Whidbey Island - 1953

== See also ==
- Maritime patrol aircraft
- List of inactive United States Navy aircraft squadrons
- List of United States Navy aircraft squadrons
- List of squadrons in the Dictionary of American Naval Aviation Squadrons
- History of the United States Navy
