= USS Oyster Bay =

Tender of the United States Navy

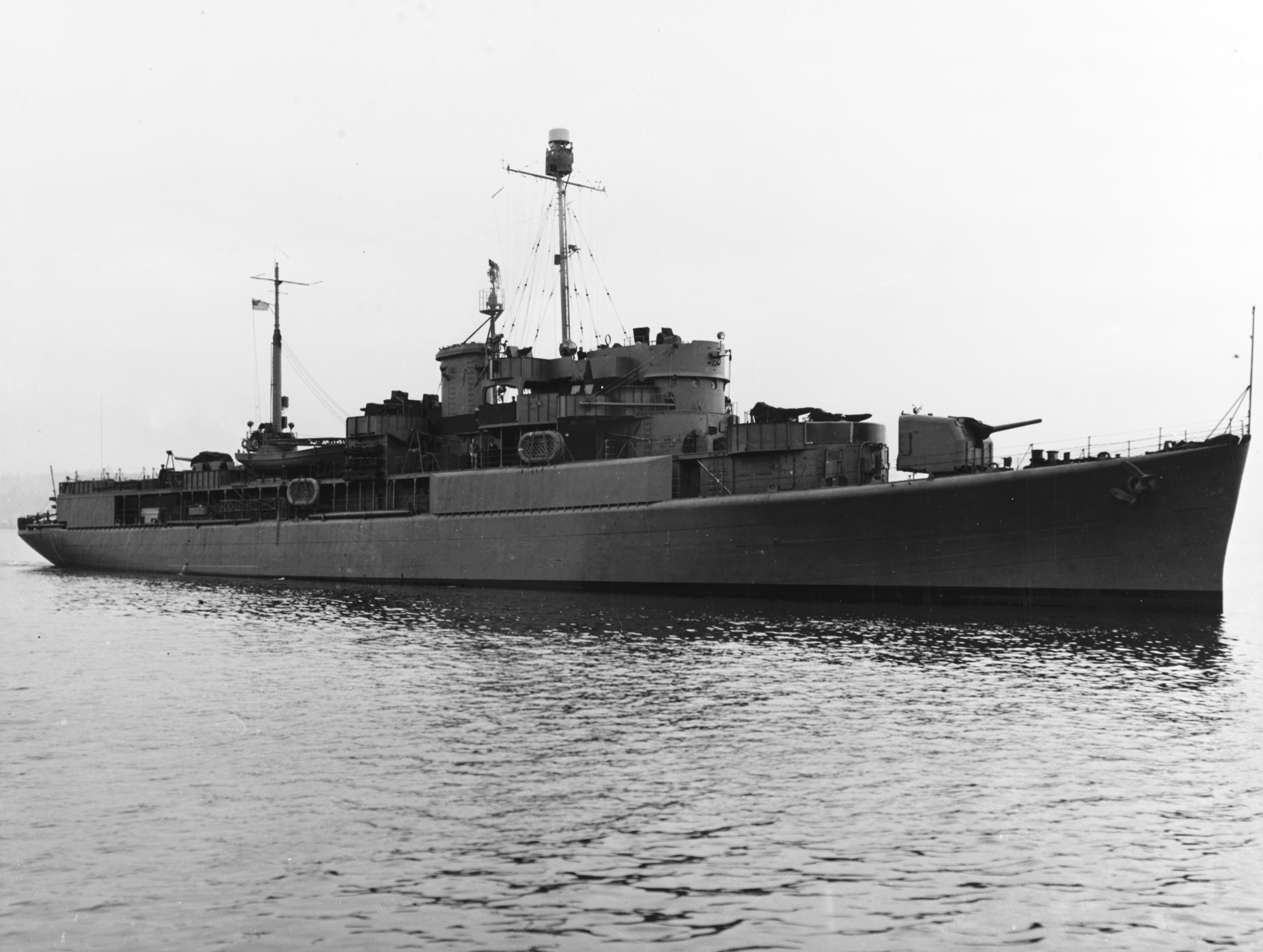
- USS Oyster Bay (AGP-6) off Puget Sound Navy Yard, Bremerton Washington on 28 November 1943

History

United States
- Name: USS Oyster Bay (AGP-6)
- Namesake: Oyster Bay, New York
- Builder: Lake Washington Shipyard, Houghton, Washington
- Laid down: 17 April 1942
- Launched: 17 September 1942
- Sponsored by: Mrs. William K. Harrill
- Reclassified: AGP-6, 1 May 1943
- Commissioned: 17 November 1943
- Decommissioned: 26 March 1946
- Stricken: 12 April 1946
- Reinstated: 4 January 1949
- Reclassified: AVP-28, 16 March 1949
- Stricken: unknown
- Fate: Transferred to Marina Militare, 23 October 1957

History

Italy
- Name: Pietro Cavezzale (A 5301)
- Namesake: Pietro Cavezzale, a Silver Medal of Military Valor recipient
- Acquired: 23 October 1957
- Decommissioned: October 1993
- Stricken: 31 March 1994
- Fate: Sold for scrapping, February 1996

General characteristics
- Class & type: Barnegat-class small seaplane tender, converted during construction into motor torpedo boat tender
- Displacement: 1,766 tons (light); 2,750 tons (full load)
- Length: 311 ft 8 in (95.00 m)
- Beam: 41 ft 1 in (12.52 m)
- Draught: 13 ft 6 in (4.11 m)
- Installed power: 6,000 horsepower (4.48 megawatts)
- Propulsion: Diesel engine, two shafts
- Speed: 18.6 knots
- Complement: 215 (ship's company); 367 (including aviation unit)
- Sensors & processing systems: Radar; sonar
- Armament: 1 × single 5 in (130 mm)-caliber dual-purpose gun mount; 1 × quad 40-mm antiaircraft gun mount; 2 × dual 40-mm antiaircraft gun mounts; 4 × 20-mm antiaircraft gun mounts; 2 × depth charge tracks

USS Oyster Bay (AGP-6), originally and later AVP-28, was a United States Navy motor torpedo boat tender in commission from 1943 to 1946. She saw service in World War II.

From 1957 to 1993, the former Oyster Bay served in the Italian Navy as the special forces tender Pietro Cavezzale (A 5301).

== Construction, commissioning, and shakedown ==
Oyster Bay was laid down as a Barnegat-class small seaplane tender designated AVP-28 at Lake Washington Shipyard, Houghton Washington, on 17 April 1942, and was launched on 7 September 1942, sponsored by Mrs. William K. Harrill. On 1 May 1943, she was reclassified as a motor torpedo tender and redesignated AGP–6 and, accordingly, completed to a modified design to allow her to fulfill this new role. She was commissioned on 17 November 1943.

Oyster Bay departed Seattle, Washington, on 7 December 1943, for shakedown at San Diego, California, which lasted for the remainder of 1943.

== World War II service ==
=== New Guinea campaign ===
Oyster Bay got underway from San Diego on 2 January 1944, steaming to Brisbane, Australia, en route Milne Bay, New Guinea, for motor torpedo boat tender operations in support of the New Guinea campaign. She serviced two squadrons of motor torpedo boats beginning on 28 February 1944, and, on 9 March 1944, got underway escorting 15 patrol torpedo boats (PT boats) to Seeadler Harbor in the Admiralty Islands.

The spring of 1944 was an active one for Oyster Bay. On 14 March 1944, she bombarded the Japanese shore installations on Pityilu Island in support of the United States Army. On 20 March 1944, she was underway for Langemak, New Guinea, with 42 wounded soldiers for evacuation to Base Hospital, Finschhafen, New Guinea. After returning to Seeadler Harbor on 31 March 1944, she bombarded Ndrilo Island to the east of Seeadler Harbor preparatory to the landing there by U.S. Army ground forces.

Oyster Bay shifted to Dreger Harbor on 19 April 1944. Allied forces moved on Aitape on 22 April 1944, and on 24 April 1944, two days after the landings at Aitape, Oyster Bay departed for the area with 15 PT boats. Japanese planes attacked the convoy on 27 April 1944, but, while one PT boat was hit, Oyster Bay escaped damage.

In May 1944, Oyster Bay proceeded to Hollandia, an area of heated Allied action. Air raid alerts were frequent, but no Japanese attacks ensued. Oyster Bay got underway to Wakde Island on 5 June 1944, with two squadrons of PT boats. After Allied forces had invaded Wakde Island on 17 May 1944, to capture a major Japanese air base there, the Japanese continued to hammer away at the newly acquired airstrip. Later in June 1944, Oyster Bay bombarded shore installations on the Wicki River and at Samar Village, preparatory to U.S. Army attacks.

Leaving Mios Woendi Island on 12 July 1944, Oyster Bay reported to Brisbane for shipyard availability. A British Royal Air Force plane struck the top of the ship's mast, carried away her antennae and damaged her navigation lights on 22 July 1944, but hasty repairs permitted Oyster Bay to depart for Mios Woendi on 16 August 1944.

=== Philippines campaign ===
Oyster Bay then steamed on to Morotai, needed as a staging area for the Philippines campaign. As the Allies assaulted the beaches of Leyte Island in the Philippines in October 1944, Oyster Bay set out for Leyte Gulf. Japanese planes counterattacked, but U.S. Navy planes and anti-aircraft fire took a heavy toll of them. In November 1944, Oyster Bay went to general quarters 221 times, but was not attacked. She shifted to San Juanico Strait on 21 November 1944, and on 24 November 1944, while taking on gasoline, she was attacked by two Nakajima B5N "Kate" torpedo bombers that were driven off by heavy antiaircraft fire. Two Mitsubishi A6M "Zeke" fighters dived on Oyster Bay on the 26 November 1944, but intense antiaircraft fire shot them both down.

In January 1945, Oyster Bay got underway for Hollandia, then returned to Leyte Gulf for motor torpedo boat tender operations on 8 February 1945. Departing for the invasion of Zamboanga on 6 March 1945, she arrived two days before the invasion and remained with the bombardment group until the landings. Oyster Bay next rendezvoused with PT boats in Sarangani Bay at Mindoro on 24 April 1945, and supported them during night raids against the Japanese positions in Davao Gulf. In May 1945, Oyster Bay reported to Leyte Gulf, thence steaming to Samar. She departed on 18 May 1945, for Tawi Tawi, where she continued motor torpedo boat tender operations until she returned to Guinan Harbor on 6 August 1945.

=== Awards ===
Oyster Bay received five battle stars for World War II service.

== Post-World War II service ==
World War II ended with the cessation of hostilities with Japan on 15 August 1945. Oyster Bay turned toward the United States on 10 November 1945, and steamed into San Francisco Bay, California, on 29 November 1945.

== Decommissioning, reserve, and disposal ==
Decommissioned on 26 March 1946, Oyster Bay was stricken from the Naval Vessel Register on 12 April 1946, and transferred to the Maritime Commission on 12 August 1946.

Transferred back to the U.S. Navy on 3 January 1949, Oyster Bay was reclassified as a small seaplane tender and redesignated AVP–28 on 16 March 1949. She was berthed at Stockton, California, where she remained in the Pacific Reserve Fleet until 1957, seeing no active service as a seaplane tender.

== Pietro Cavezzale (A 5301) ==
Oyster Bay was transferred to the Government of Italy on 23 October 1957. She then served in the Italian Navy as the special forces tender Pietro Cavezzale (A 5301).

The Italian Navy decommissioned Pietro Cavezzale in October 1993 and she was stricken by the Italian Navy on 31 March 1994. She was sold for scrapping in February 1996.
