= Mokerang Airfield =

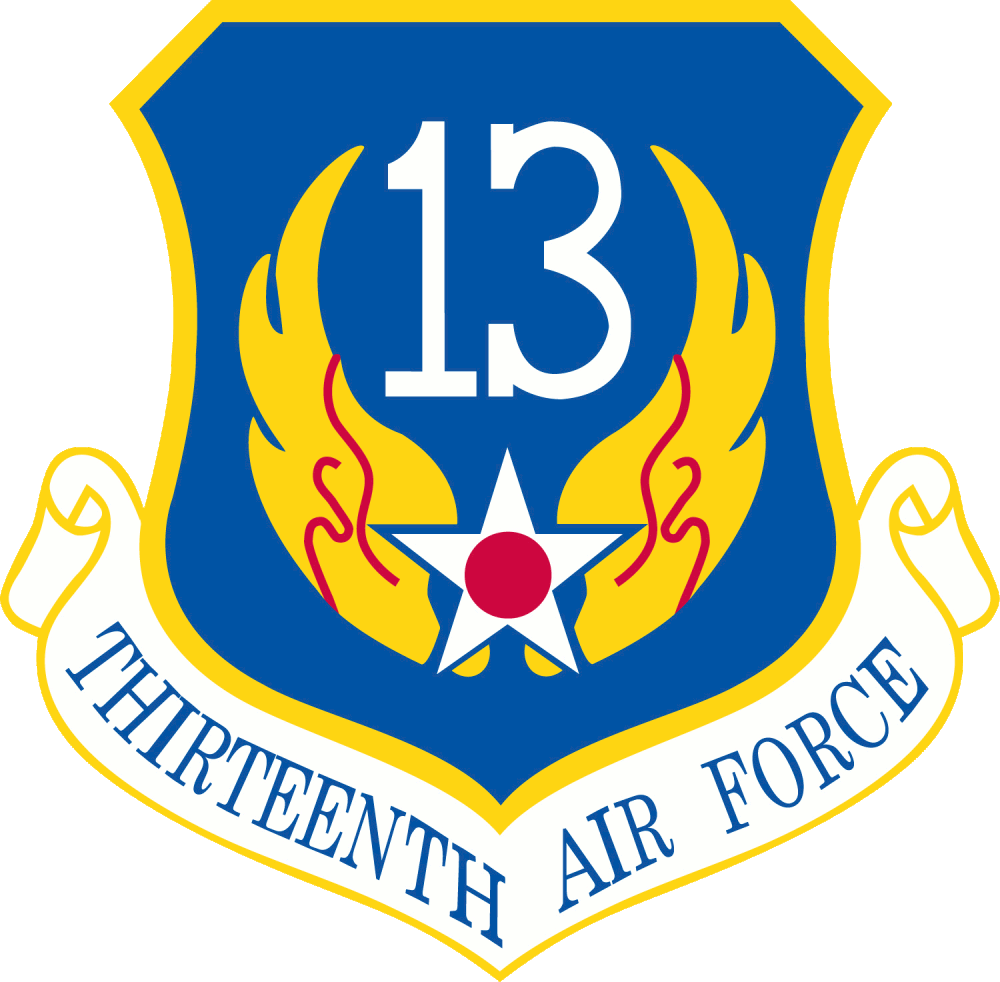
Mokerang Airfield
- Part of Thirteenth Air Force
- Located on Los Negros Island, Admiralty Islands, Papua New Guinea.

Site information
- Type: Military airfield
- Controlled by: United States Army Air Forces

Location
- Mokerang Airfield, Papua New Guinea
- Coordinates: 01°58′51.6″S 147°22′40.8″E

Site history
- Built: 1944
- In use: 1944-1945

Mokerang Airfield, was an airfield on the northwest tip of Los Negros Island, 5 miles (8.0 km) NNW of Momote Airfield.

== History ==
It was built by the Imperial Japanese at Mokerang Plantation shortly after Lorengau Airfield during World War II and liberated during the Battle of Los Negros as part of the Admiralty Islands campaign.

The 836th Engineer Aviation Battalion and Seabee constructed two runways 8,000 feet (2,400 m) long × 150 feet (46 m) wide and 500-foot (150 m) overruns at each end, and the 104th Naval Construction Battalion and 46th Naval Construction Battalion built the taxiways and dispersal areas as part of Manus Naval Base.

The runways had a bearing WNW/ESE 114 degrees/294 degrees magnetic. A storage depot for 30,000 barrels of fuel was stockpiled at Mokerang.

The airfield was abandoned at the end of the war and has been reclaimed by vegetation.

=== Units based at Mokerang ===
- 13th Air Force (13th Air Task Force)
- 307th Bombardment Group HQ
  - 424th Bombardment Squadron (B-24s)
  - 370th Bombardment Squadron (B-24s)
  - 371st Bombardment Squadron (B-24s)
  - 372nd Bombardment Squadron (B-24s)
- XIII Bomber Command, 13th Air Force
- 18th Fighter Group, 419th Night Fighter Squadron (detachment) P-61s
