= Ponam Island =

Island in Papua New Guinea

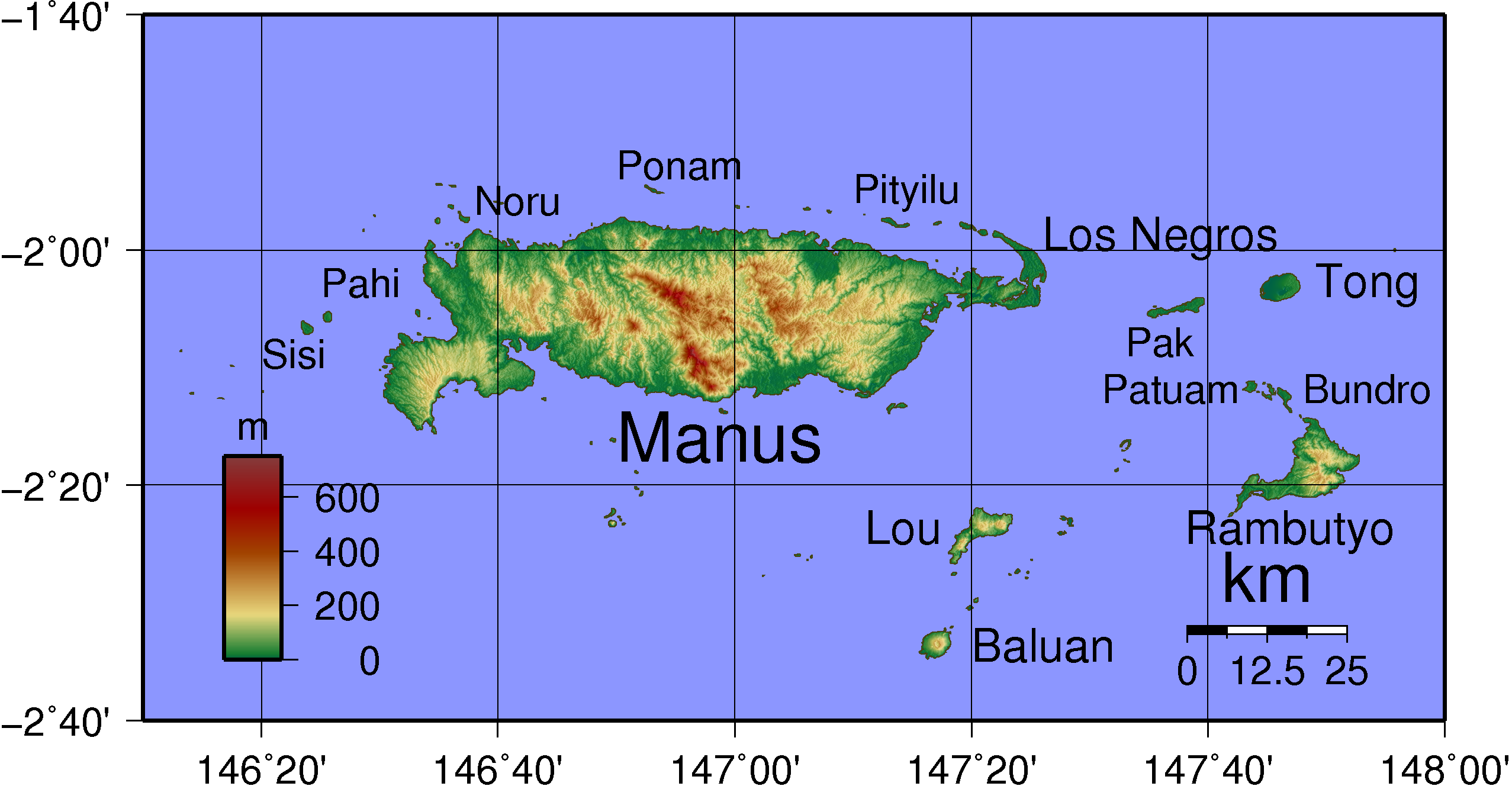
- Location of the Ponam Island among the Admiralty Islands

- Location within Papua New Guinea

Geography
- Coordinates: 1°54′45″S 146°53′8″E
- Archipelago: Admiralty Islands
- Length: 2.4 km (1.49 mi)
- Width: 0.365 km (0.2268 mi)
- Naval Base Administrative: United States Navy; 1944-1947

www.ponam Island.com

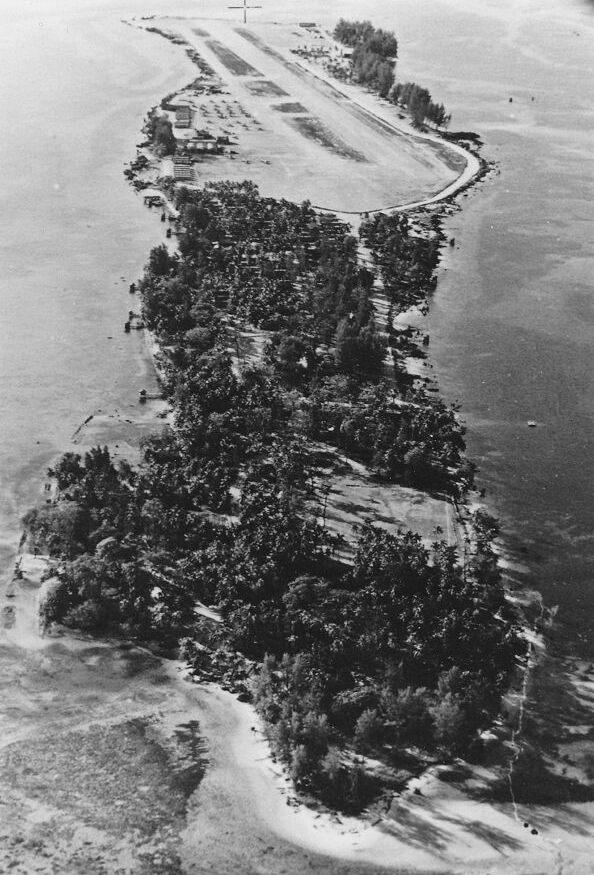
Ponam Island with ruway and base.

Ponam Island is located off the north coast of Manus Island in Papua New Guinea.

The Ponam language is spoken on the island.

The Ponam Airfield was built by the US Navy 78th Naval Construction Battalion "Seabees" between June and August 1944. As half of the work area was swamp, coral was blasted and dredged from the ocean bed and used as landfill. During the Admiralty Islands campaign, it was used as a fighter base to provide repair and overhaul facilities for carrier aircraft, as part of Manus Naval Base. The USO entertainer Bob Hope stopped at Ponam Airfield in 1944 with an unscheduled show with troops from surrounding bases.

== Ponam Airfield ==
Based at Ponam Airfield was:

- 78th Naval Construction Battalion
- 140th Battalion
- ACORN 28 - Seabee unit
- VMF-312 (24 x FG Vought F4U Corsair unit)
- VP-130 (15 Lockheed Ventura [PV-1] unit)
- VC-75 (Grumman F4F Wildcat unit)
- Carrier Aircraft Service Unit 42
- Carrier Aircraft Service Unit 13
- Carrier Aircraft Service 587

== See also ==
- Pityilu Island
