= Pityilu Island =

Island in Papua New Guinea

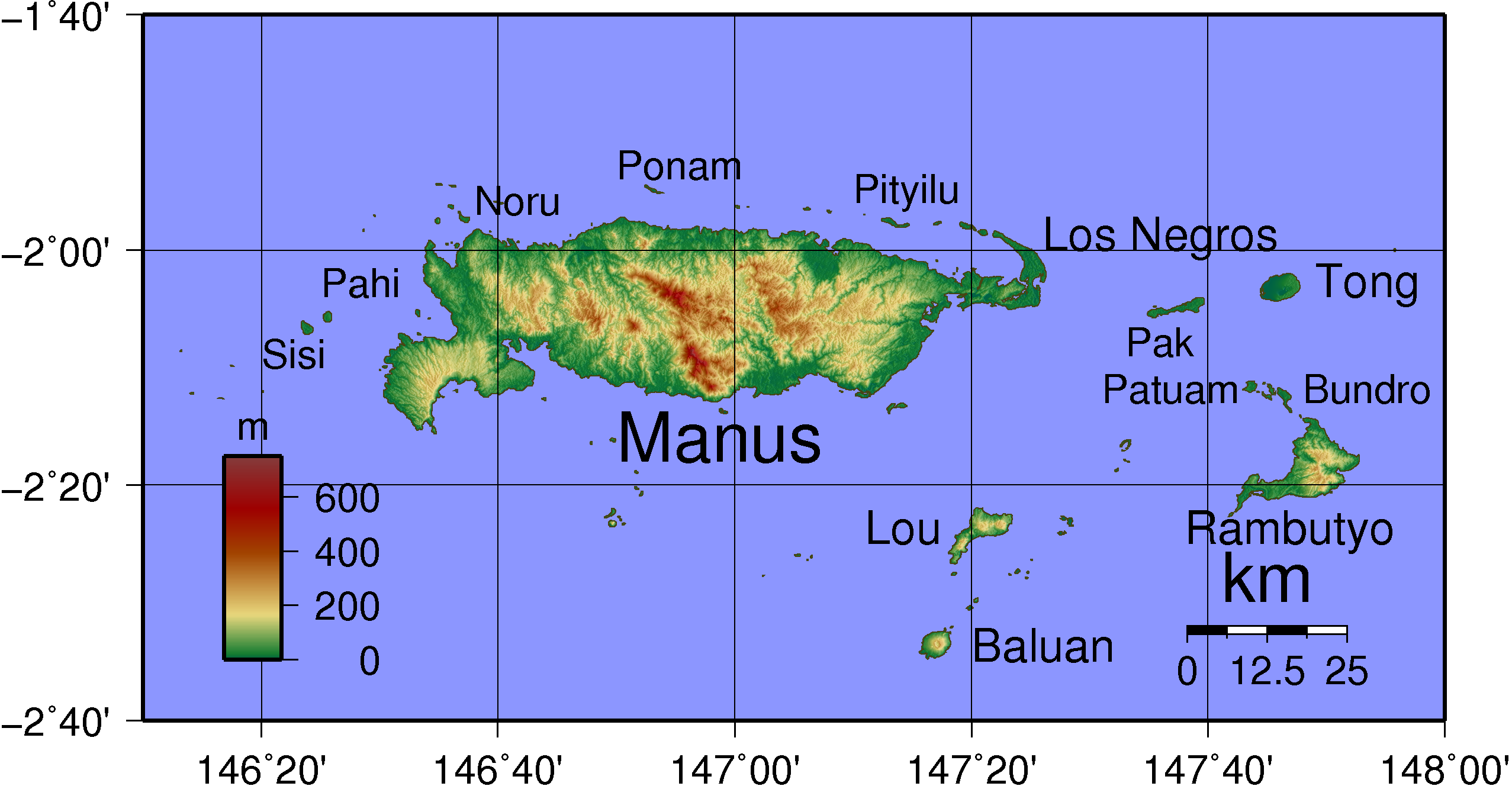
- Location of the Pityilu Island among the Admiralty Islands

- Location within Papua New Guinea

Geography
- Coordinates: 01°57′41.91″S 147°13′32.85″E
- Archipelago: Admiralty Islands
- Length: 4.8 km (2.98 mi)
- Width: 0.19 km (0.118 mi)

Administration
- Papua New Guinea
- Province: Manus Province
- Naval Base Administrative: United States Navy; 1944-1947

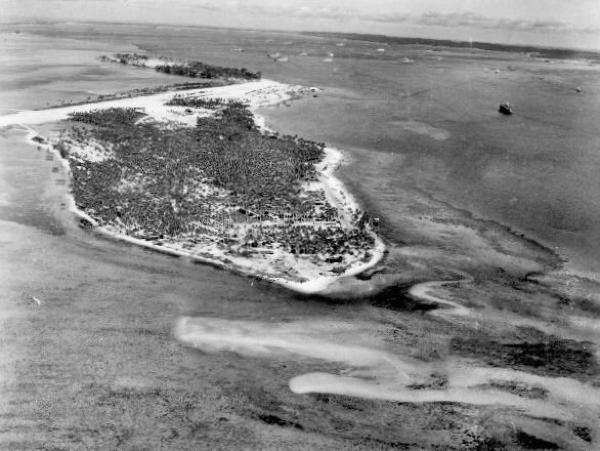
Pityilu Island with air base

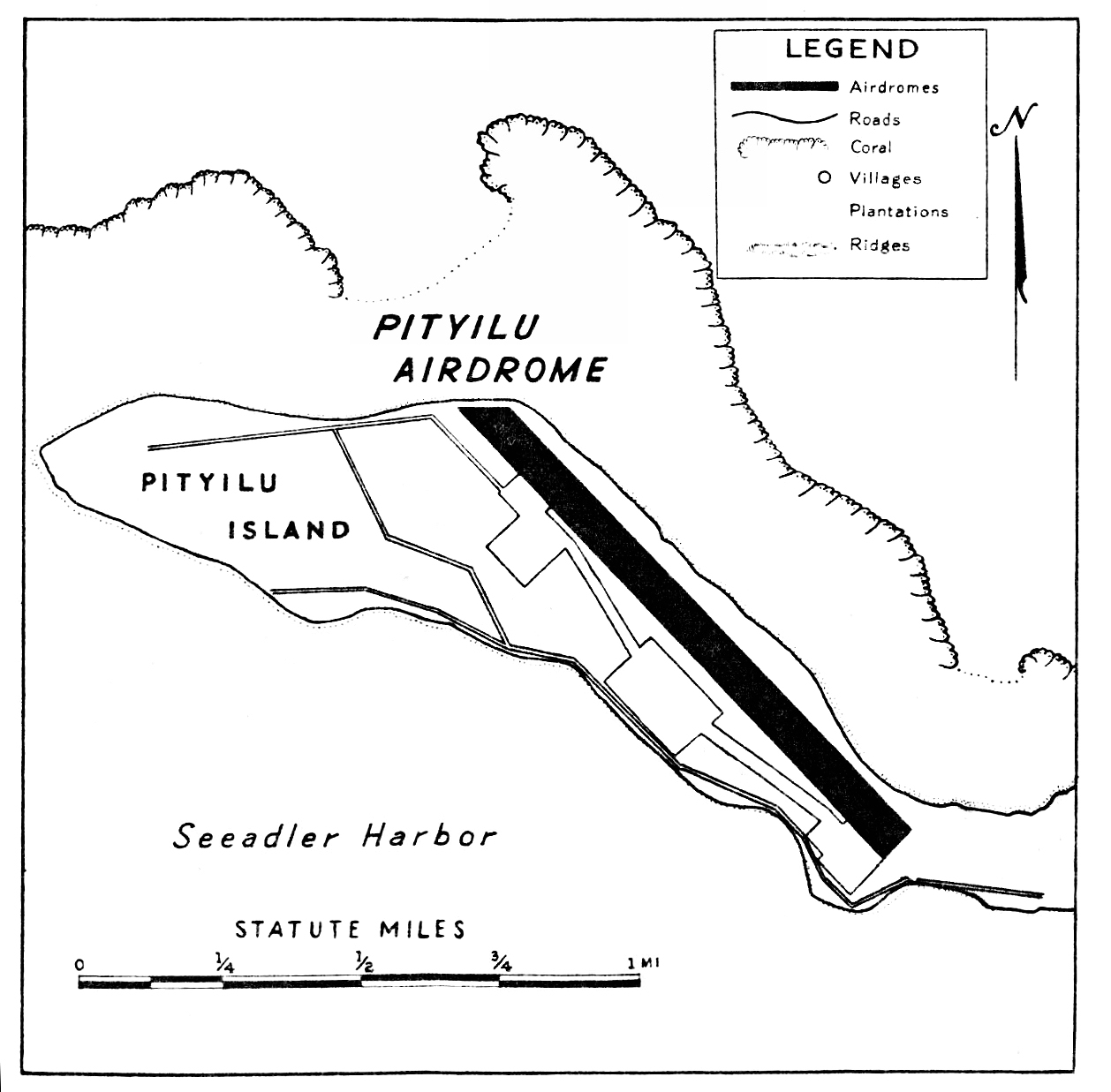
Map Pityilu Island with air base 1944

Pityilu Island is part of Manus Province in northern Papua New Guinea and part of the Admiralty Islands. It is off the northern coast of Manus Island and is nearly 4.8 km long and varies in width from 76 to 198 metres.

== History ==
Pityilu Island was occupied by the Imperial Japanese forces in 1942.

On 30 March 1944, the island was assaulted by the reinforced 1st Squadron of 7th Cavalry of the United States Army. 59 Imperial Japanese were killed and 8 cavalrymen were killed with 6 were wounded in the assault.

Pityilu Island was selected to become an airstrip for the use of the United States Navy with a Rest & Recreation facility designed to accommodate up to 10,000 servicemen. The facilities were constructed by the 140th Naval Construction Battalion in June 1944. Pityilu Airstrip consisted of a single runway, made of crushed coral 5,300 feet (1,600 m) x 150 feet (46 m). that was built by the 71st CB as part of Manus Naval Base. The Navy also had an aircraft carrier fighter plane training base, with storage of 350 spare planes at the base.

== Pityilu Airfield ==
  - Based at Pityilu Airfield was:
  - VPB-146 (PV-1, Lockheed Ventura unit)
  - ACORN 28
  - VJ-2 (JM-1 detachment Able, Martin B-26 Marauder unit)
  - Carrier Aircraft Service Unit 42
  - Carrier Aircraft Service Unit 13

== See also ==
- Ponam Island
