= Lorengau Airfield =

Defunct airport in Papua New Guinea

Coordinates: 2°01′13″S 147°16′00″E

Lorengau Airfield was an airfield located at Lorengau on the north coast of Manus Island.

== History ==
An airfield built to service the missions near Lorengau. Extended by the Imperial Japanese during World War II. Consisted of a single grassed runway 3,500 feet (1,100 m) long x 375 feet (114 m) wide. A number of revetments were constructed at the southern end of the runway.

After the liberation of the airfield, by the 8th Cavalry Regiment during the Battle of Manus, which was part of the Admiralty Islands campaign, the airfield was not developed further.

=== Post war ===
The airfield was abandoned after the war.

The town of Lorengau was extended to the west of the jetty on Seeadler Harbour after the war, built on the cleared area of the airfield. The major road alignments follow the edges of the airfield.
