= List of Royal Australian Navy bases =

The following is a list of current and former commissioned bases used by the Royal Australian Navy.

== Current bases ==
Naval facility	Purpose	State/Territory	Location	Period	Notes
Fleet Base East	Fleet base, depot, dockyard	New South Wales	Sydney	1788–present	Includes HMAS Kuttabul, HMAS Waterhen, Garden Island dockyard & berthing facilities
Fleet Base West (HMAS Stirling)	Fleet base, depot	Western Australia	Garden Island	1978–present	Major west coast warship & submarine base
HMAS Albatross	Naval air station	New South Wales	Nowra	1948–present	Fleet Air Arm
HMAS Cairns	Base	Queensland	Cairns	1974–present	Patrol boat, hydrography, and minor war vessels base
HMAS Cerberus	Training facility	Victoria	Crib Point	1912–1921; 1921–present	Formerly located at Williamstown
HMAS Coonawarra	Base	Northern Territory	Darwin	1970–present	Former Naval Wireless Transmitting Station, now a patrol boat base
HMAS Creswell	Training facility	Jervis Bay Territory	Jervis Bay	1958–present	Location of the Royal Australian Naval College
HMAS Encounter (naval base)	Administration	South Australia	Adelaide	1965–1994; 2022–present	Administration
HMAS Harman	Communications facility	Australian Capital Territory	Canberra	1943–present	A tri-service base
HMAS Kuttabul	Administrative, logistical, training, accommodation	New South Wales	Sydney	1943–present	Administrative base for Fleet Base East
HMAS Moreton	Administration	Queensland	Brisbane	1932–1994; 2016–present	Administration and reserves
HMAS Penguin	Depot, specialist training	New South Wales	Balmoral	1913–1942; 1943–present	Location of Balmoral Naval Hospital, hydrographic school, diving school and medical school
HMAS Waterhen	Base	New South Wales	Waverton	1962–present	Mine Warfare and Clearance Diving Headquarters, part of Fleet Base East
HMAS Watson	Training facility	New South Wales	Watsons Bay	1945–present	Location of Maritime Warfare school

== Former bases ==
Former naval facility	Former purpose	Country (if outside Australia)/ State/Territory	Location	Period	Notes
HMAS Assault	Training facility	New South Wales	Port Stephens	1942–1945	
HMAS Basilisk	Depot	Papua New Guinea	Port Moresby	1942–1945; 1974–1983	
HMAS Brisbane	Depot	Queensland	Brisbane	1940–1942	
HMAS Carpentaria	Base	Queensland	Thursday Island	1945–1946	
HMAS Carpentaria	Administrative centre	England	London	1966–1981	
HMAS Commonwealth	Administrative centre	Japan	Kure	1948–1956	
HMAS Derwent	Depot	Tasmania	Hobart	1940–1942	
HMAS Encounter	Depot	South Australia	Port Adelaide	1965–1994	
HMAS Gilolo	Depot	Indonesia	Halmahera Island	1945–1946	
HMAS Huon	Depot	Tasmania	Hobart	1942–1994	
HMAS Kuranda	Depot	Queensland	Cairns	1944–1945	
HMAS Ladava	Depot	Papua New Guinea	Milne Bay	1943–1945	
HMAS Leeuwin	Depot; Training facility	Western Australia	Fremantle	1940–1986	Currently used by Australian Army, known as Leeuwin Barracks
HMAS Lonsdale	Depot	Victoria	Port Melbourne	1940–1992	
HMAS Lusair	Depot	Papua New Guinea	Torokina	1945	
HMAS Madang	Depot	Papua New Guinea	Madang	1944–1946	
HMAS Magnetic	Depot	Queensland	Townsville	1942–1948	
HMAS Maitland	Depot	New South Wales	Newcastle	1940–1946	
HMAS Melville	Depot	Northern Territory	Darwin	1940–1975	Replaced by HMAS Coonawarra
HMAS Mindari	Training facility	New South Wales	Woolloomooloo	1945–1948	
HMAS Moreton	Depot	Queensland	Brisbane	1942–1994	
HMAS Nirimba	Naval air station Training facility	New South Wales	Quakers Hill	1953–1955; 1956–1994	Now a campus of the Western Sydney University (2007)
HMAS Platypus	Submarine base	New South Wales	Neutral Bay	1967–1999	
HMAS Rushcutter	Depot	New South Wales	Rushcutters Bay	1901–1979	Commissioned as HMAS Rushcutter on 1 August 1940
HMAS Seeadler	Depot	Papua New Guinea	Los Negros Island	1950	Name of base changed to HMAS Tarangau.
HMAS Tarangau	Depot	Papua New Guinea	Dreger Harbour near Finschhafen, Los Negros Island	1946–1950; 1950–1974	Base at Dreger closed in 1950, and the base name and its personnel and equipment transferred to the former HMAS Seeadler at Manus Island.
HMAS Torrens	Depot	South Australia	Port Adelaide	1940–1964	
HMAS Waratah	Administrative centre	United States of America	Washington DC	1966–1980	
