= Lombrum Naval Base =

Naval base on Manus Island in Papua New Guinea

PNG Defence Force Base Lombrum
- HMPNGS Tarangau
- Manus Island in Papua New Guinea

Site information
- Type: Naval base
- Operator: United States Navy (1944 – 1946); Royal Australian Navy (1950 – 1974); Papua New Guinea Defence Force (1974 – present)

Location
- Location in Papua New Guinea
- Coordinates: 2°02′25″S 147°22′19″E

Site history
- Built: January 1944
- Battles/wars: Pacific War, World War II

Garrison information
- Garrison: Maritime Operations Element
- Occupants: Guardian-class patrol boat

Lombrum Naval Base, also known as HMPNGS Tarangau and formerly PNG Defence Force Base Lombrum, is a naval military base operated by the Maritime Operations Element of the Papua New Guinea Defence Force (PNGDF). It is located on Manus Island in Papua New Guinea. Lombrum is the home port of the PNGDF's Pacific-class patrol boat force.

After redevelopment in 1950 by the Royal Australian Navy, it was known as HMAS Seeadler, being renamed HMAS Tarangau soon afterwards.

The Manus Regional Processing Centre was established within the base in 2001.

== History ==
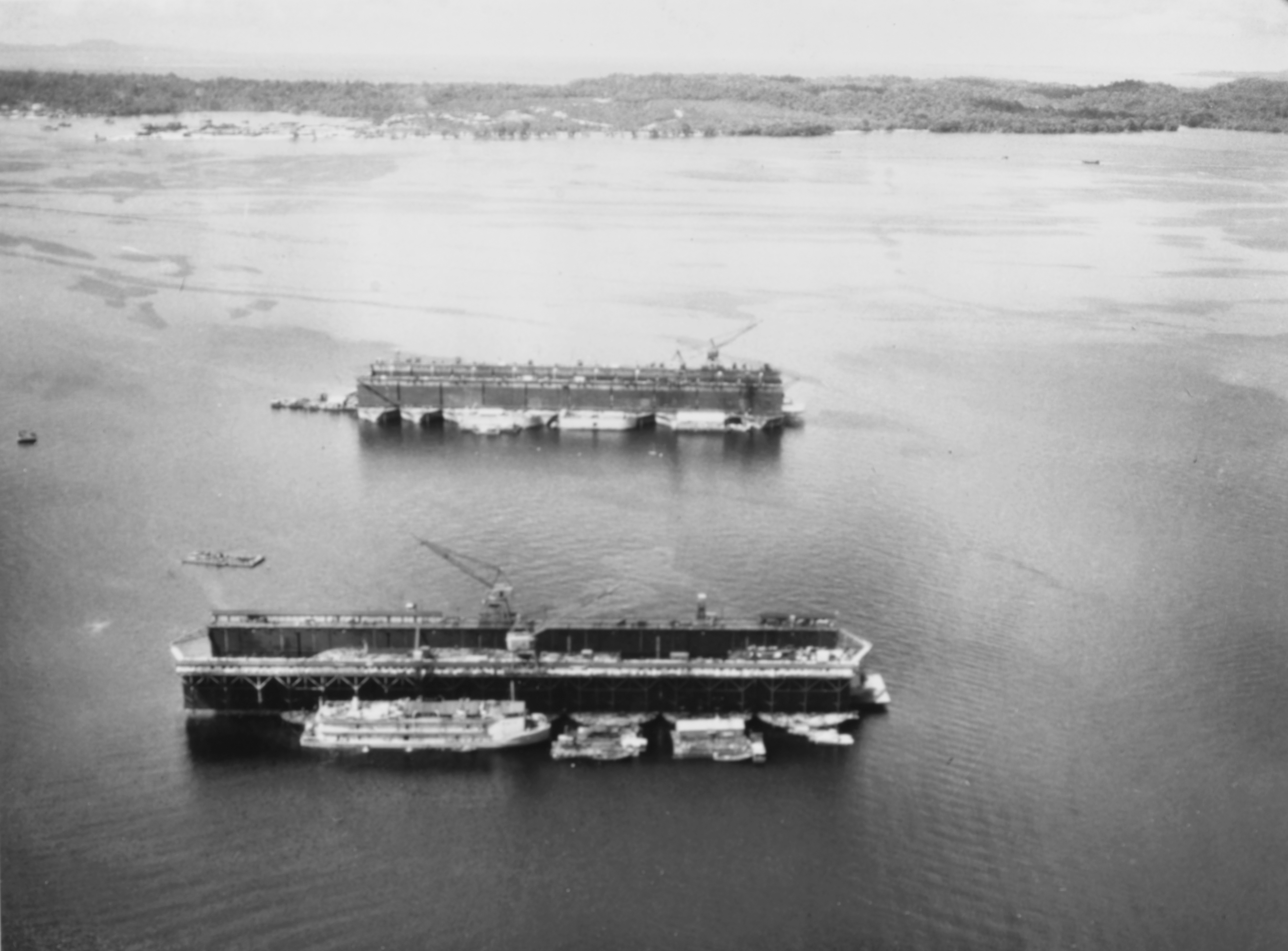
ABSD-4 background in Seeadler Harbor with ABSD-2 (foreground) in September 1945

The naval facility, Manus Naval Base, was first built during World War II as a "Lion" which was code for a major Fleet installation of the United States Navy. It was constructed by the Seabees of CBs 11, 58, and 71 and commissioned in January 1944. The base and Seeadler Harbor became a major US Naval Advance Base during the latter part of the war. The base was a major ship repair depot. At the base was the Large auxiliary floating drydock USS ABSD-4 and ASDB-2, able to repair the largest capital ships. There were camps on Manus Island and Los Negros Island. The facility was abandoned by the Americans in 1946 with the downsizing of their military and their policy of containment shifted strategic focus away from the Southern Pacific.

The Australian government took over the site, redeveloped it, and reopened it as the Royal Australian Navy (RAN) base HMAS Seeadler, commissioning on 1 January 1950 to replace the RAN base at Dreger Harbour, near Finschhafen. The base was renamed HMAS Tarangau, the name of the former Dreger Harbour base, on 1 April 1950.

The base was used as a refueling and stores point for RAN ships traveling between Australia and South East Asia. The size of the facility gradually shrank through the 1950s and 1960s, and the decision was made to hand the facility over to Papua New Guinea as part of the process leading to the nation's independence from Australia. As part of this, Tarangau was paid off on 14 November 1974 and given to the Papua New Guinea Defence Force, who reactivated the base as PNG Defence Force Base Lombrum.

In mid-2020, the base commenced a two stage upgrade funded by Australia. The upgrade was announced by Australia and PNG in 2018. The second stage of the upgrade will cost A$175 million. The upgrade will support PNG's new Guardian-class patrol boats that PNG is receiving from Australia. The upgrade will also enable port visits by RAN boats and provide infrastructure for the RAN's Canberra class ships to deliver troops and equipment.

== Gallery ==
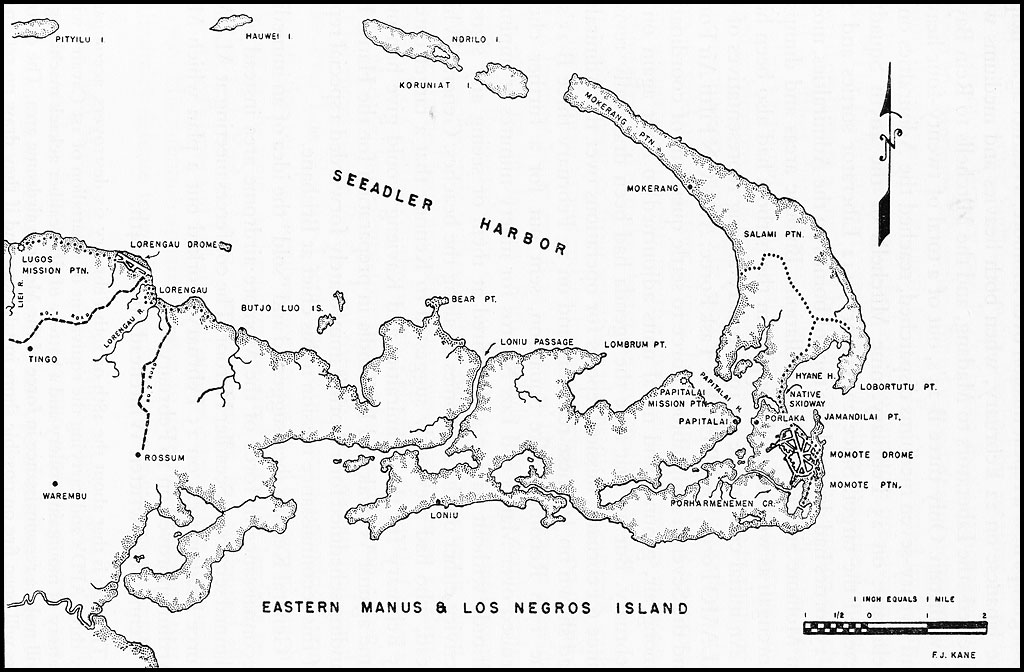
US Navy map Manus Naval Base in 1945

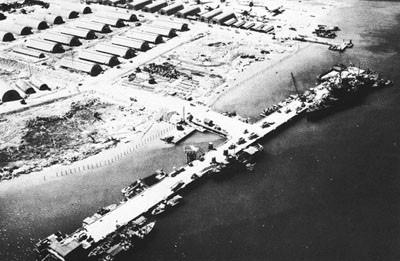
Ship Repair Facilities Manus Naval Base at Lombrum in 1944. Built by 46th Seabees

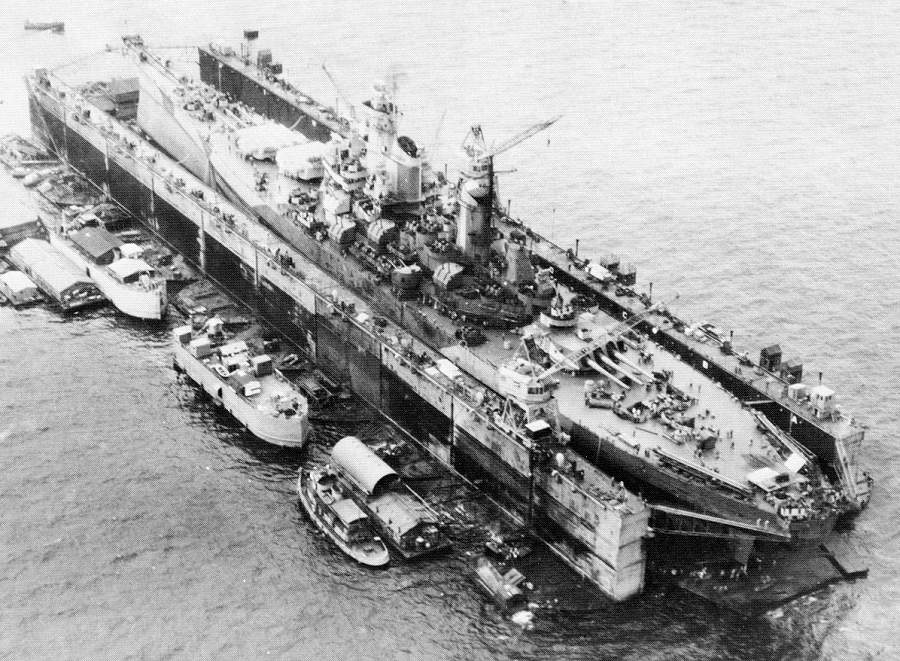
USS Iowa battleship being repaired at Manus Naval Base on December 28, 1944

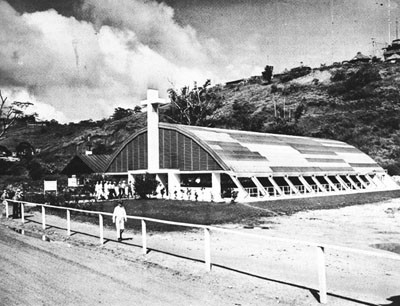
Manus Naval Base Chapel. Chapel dedication services on Easter morning, April 1, 1945

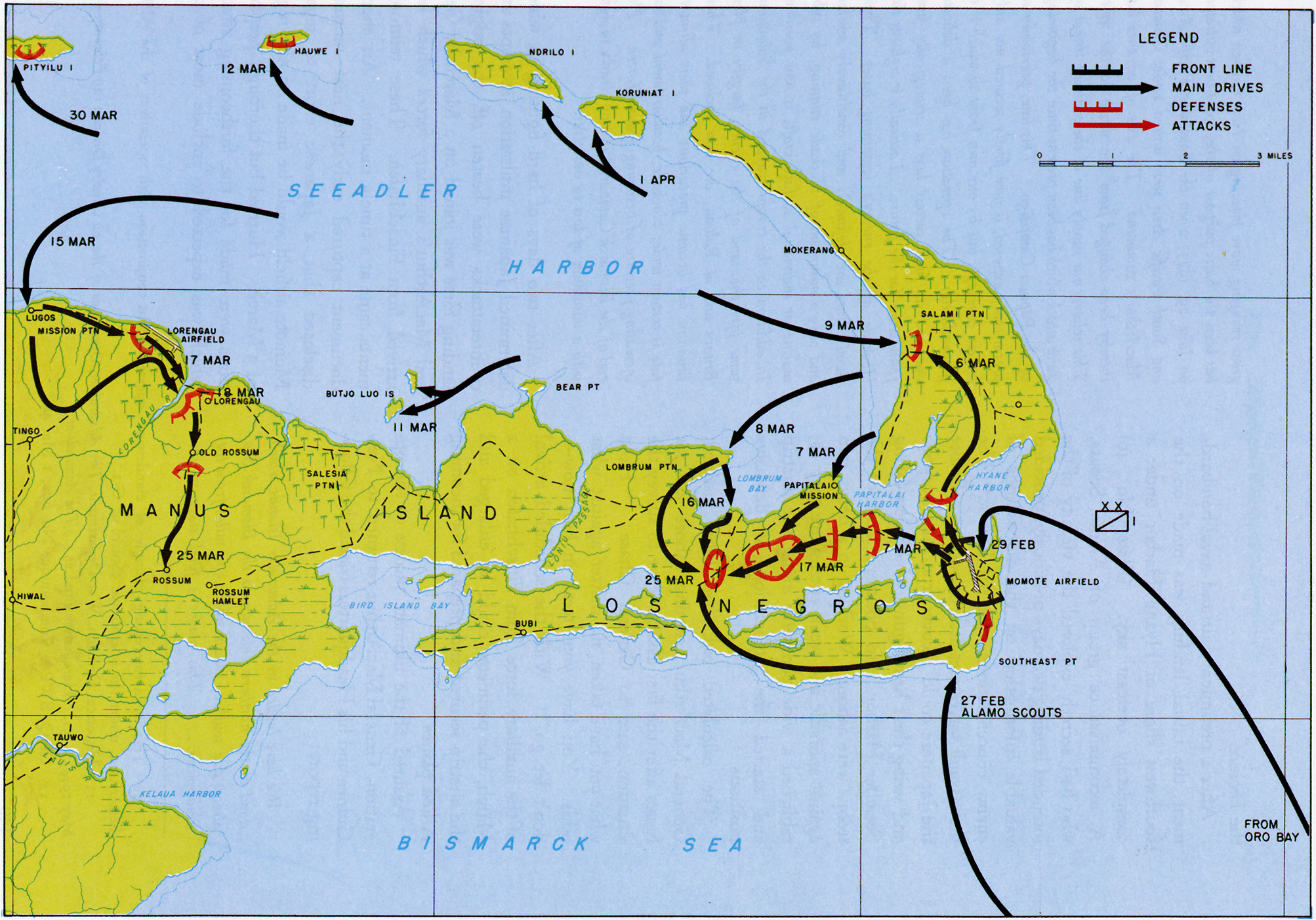
Map Admiralty Islands operations, 29 February to 30 May 1944

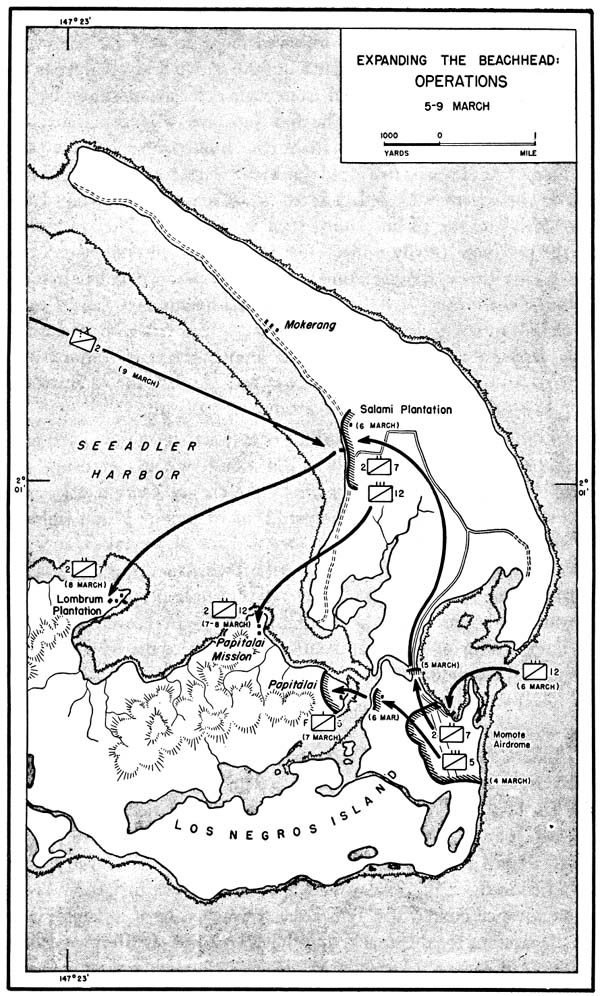
Admiralty Islands map 1944

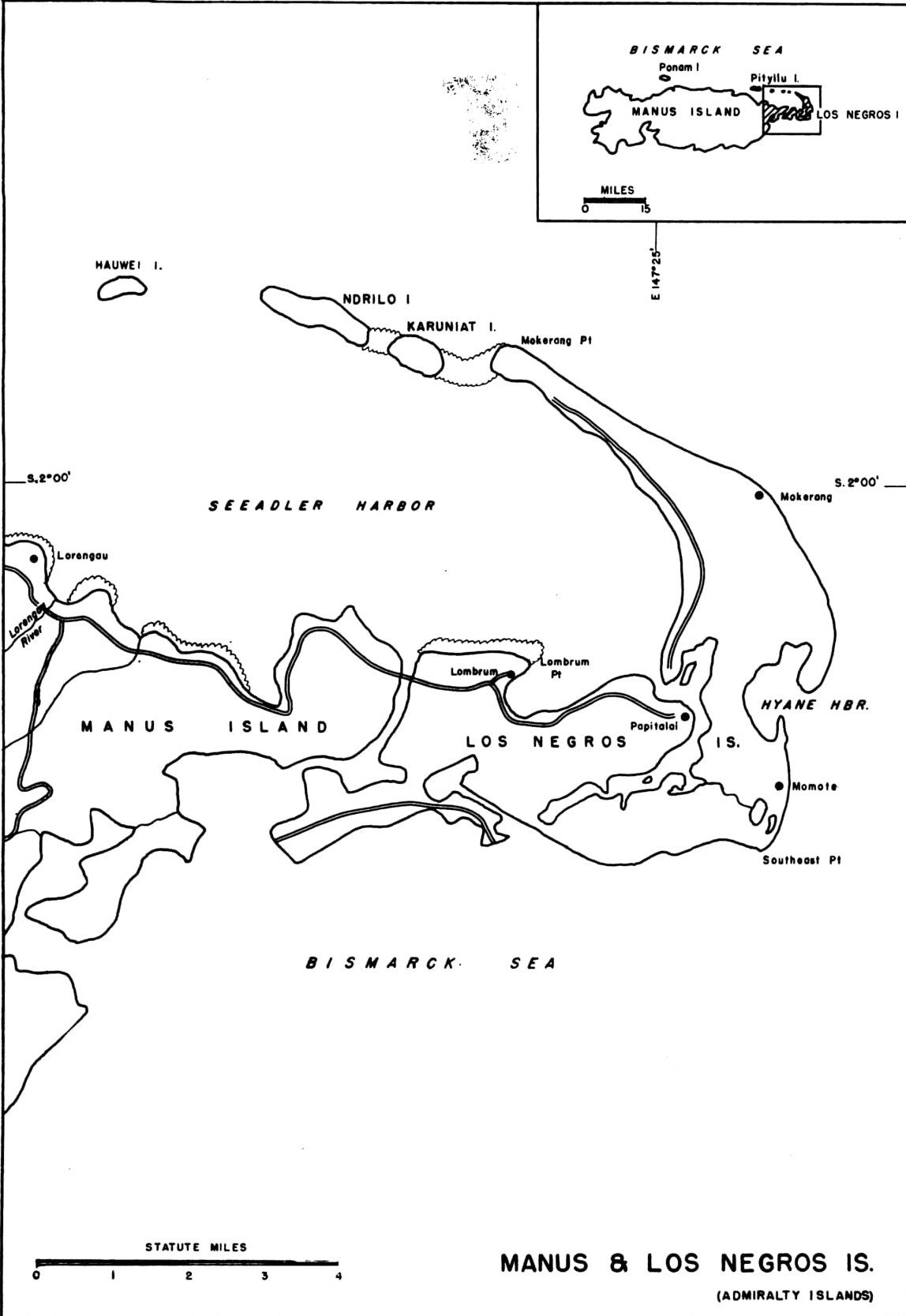
Map of Manus and Los Negros

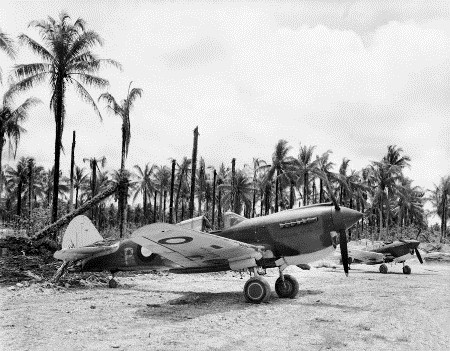
RAAF Kittyhawks on Momote Airfield, 8 March 1944

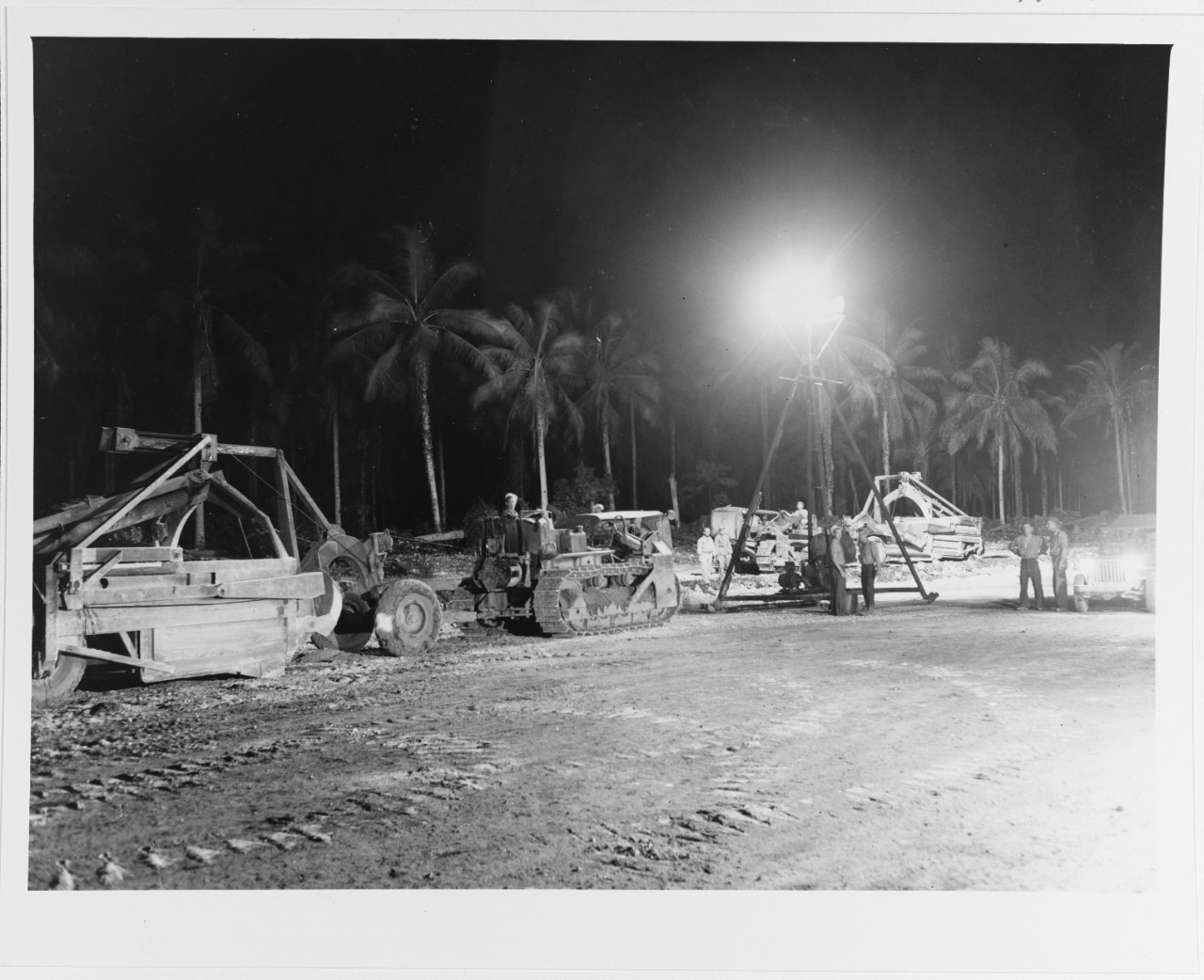
Momote Airfield with Seabees working at night in 1944. CB 40 worked day and night on the Los Negros Momote Airfield.

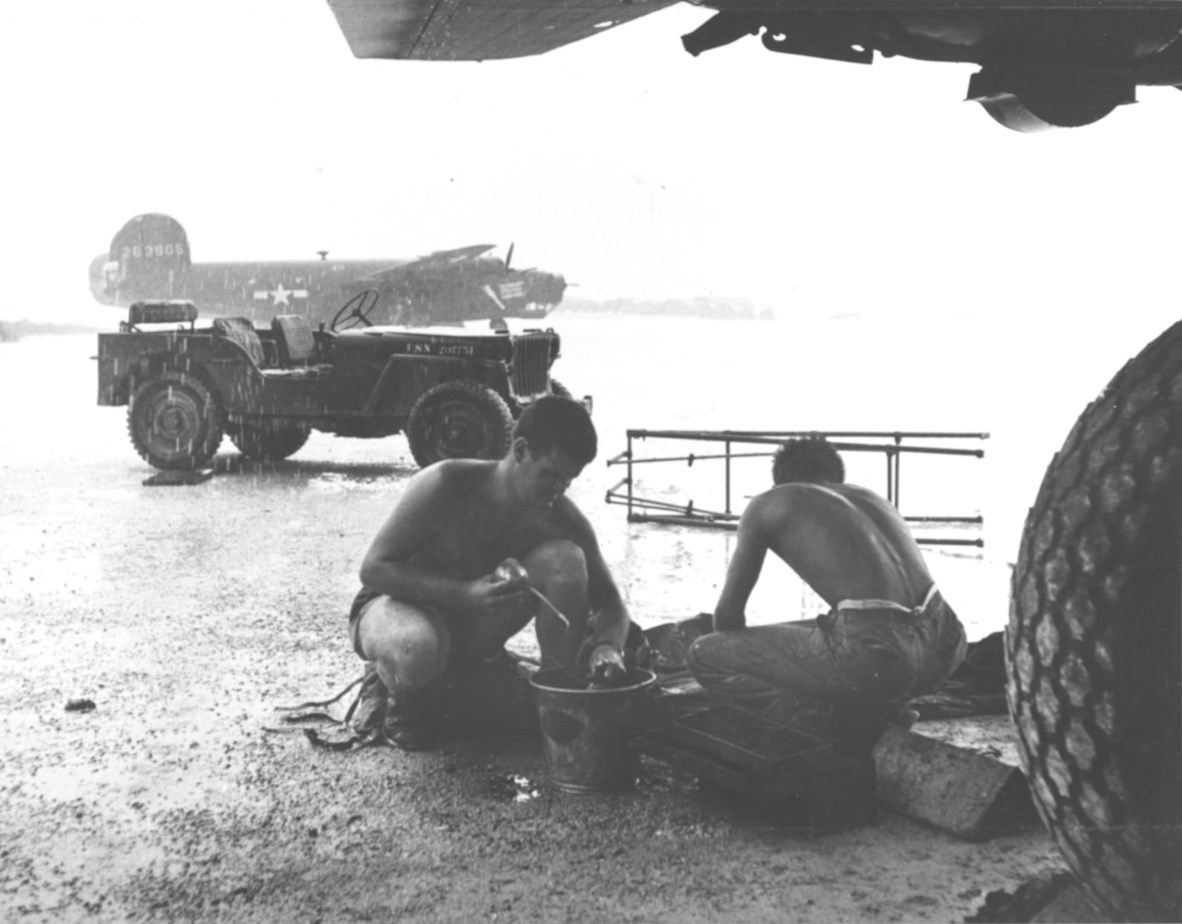
US Navy maintenance crews VB-106 clean engine parts under an airplane wing while raining at Momote Airstrip in March 1944

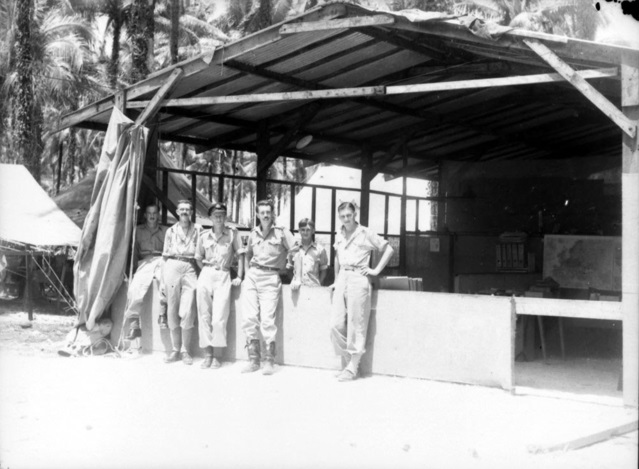
No. 71 Squadron RAAF on Los Negros base

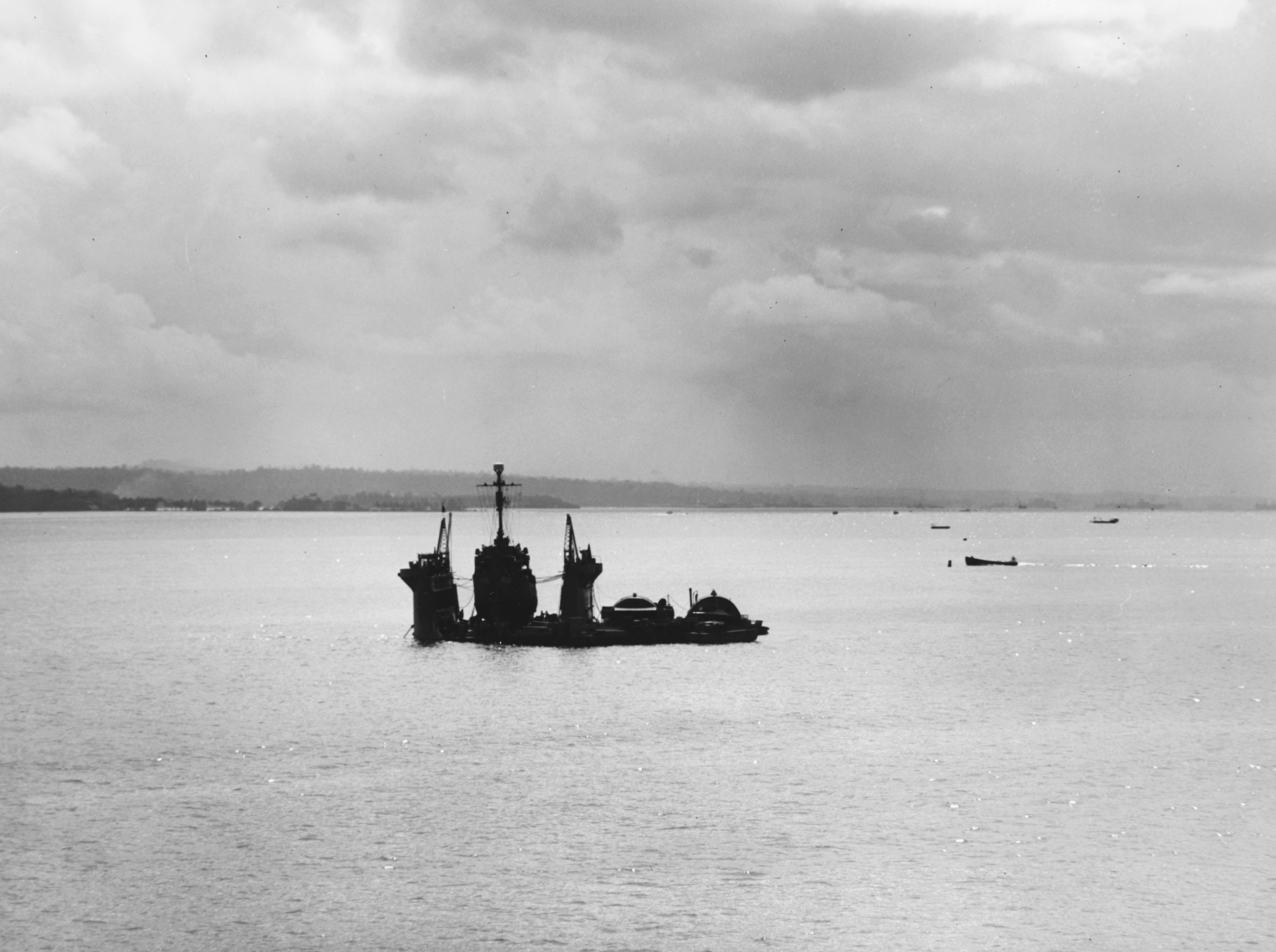
Small Auxiliary Floating Dry Dock, repairing submarine chaser PC-1121 at Seeadler Harbor in September 1944

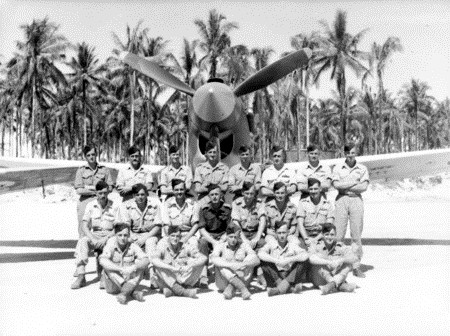
No. 76 Squadron RAAF

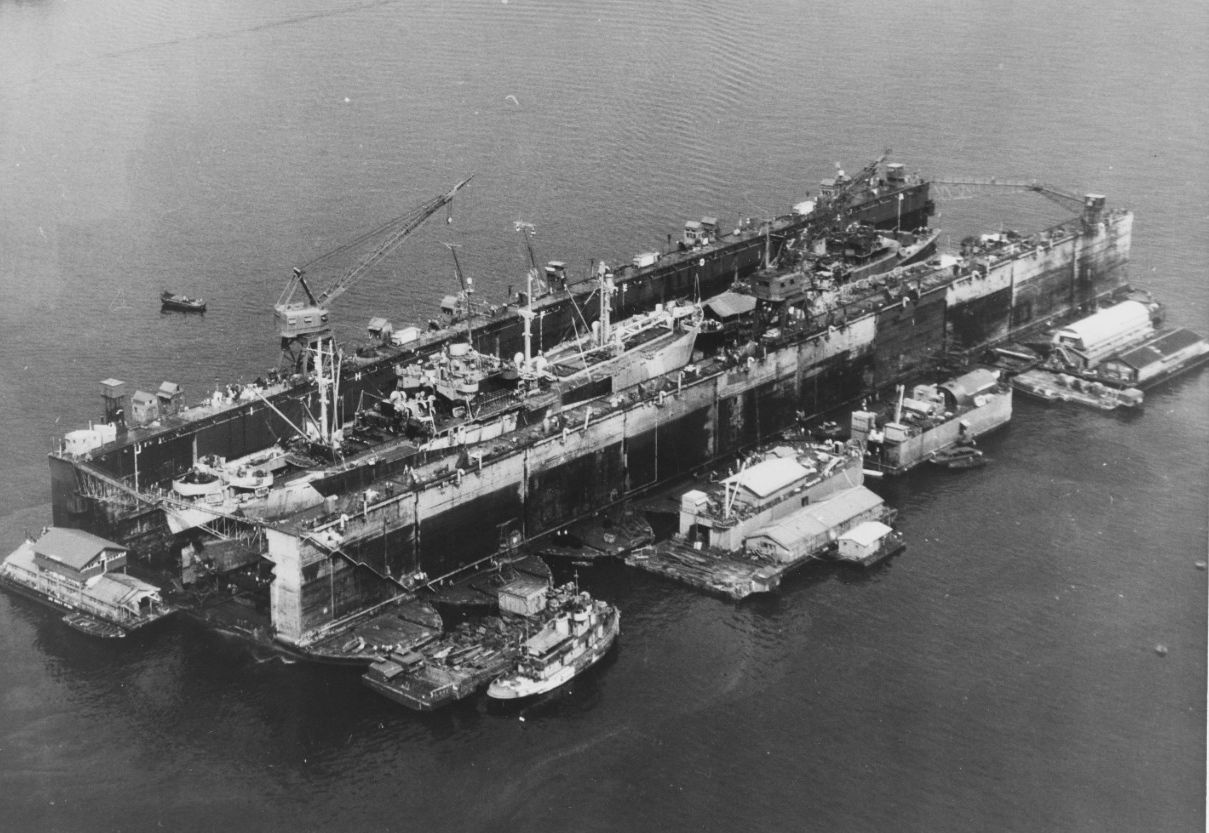
US Navy floating Dry Dock Number 4 in Seeadler Harbor 1945, surrounded by floating barges with workshops and a tugboat, repairing seaplane tender and Navy Liberty ship

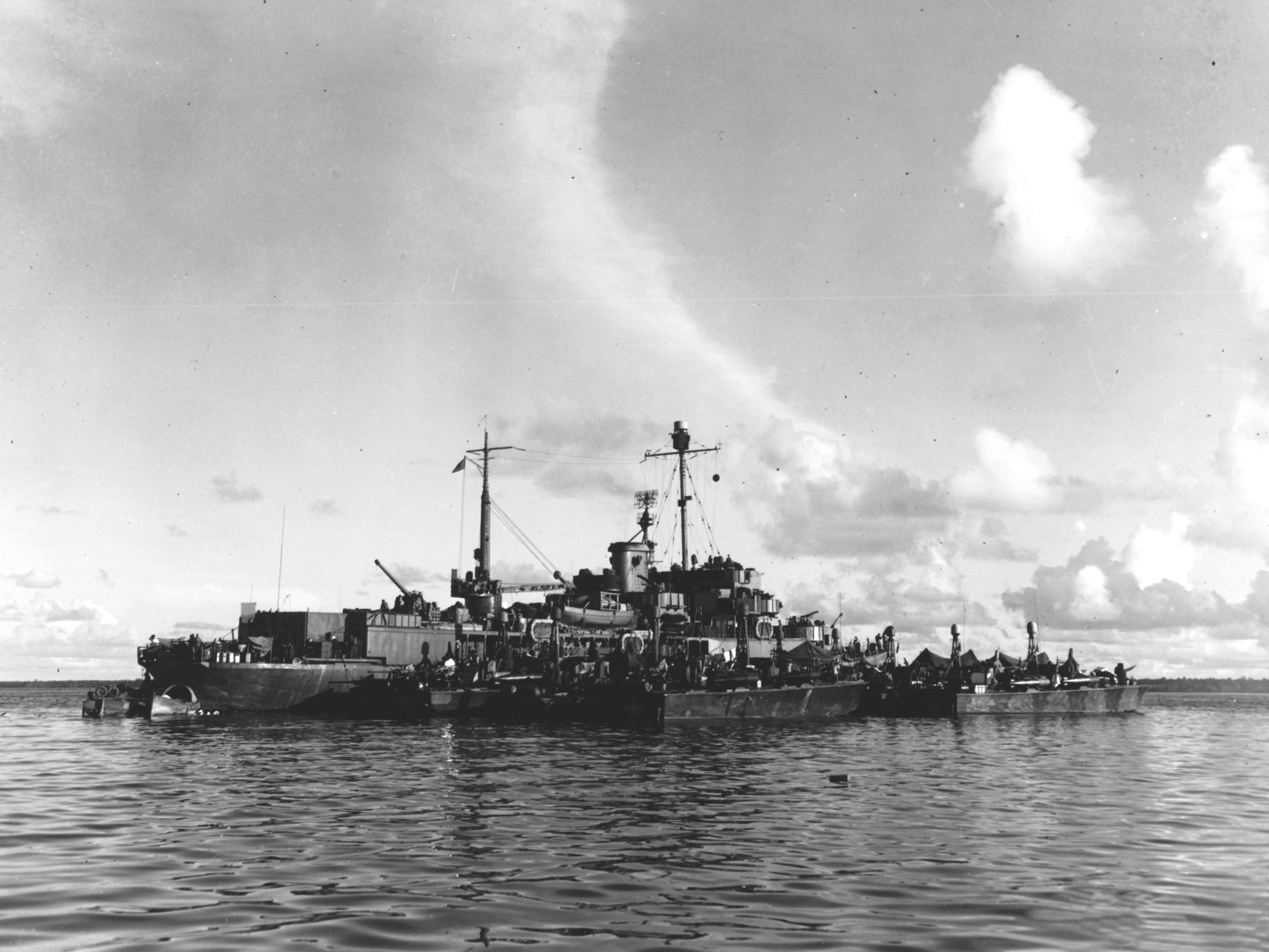
USS Oyster Bay (AGP-6) tending PT boats in Seeadler Harbor on March 25, 1944

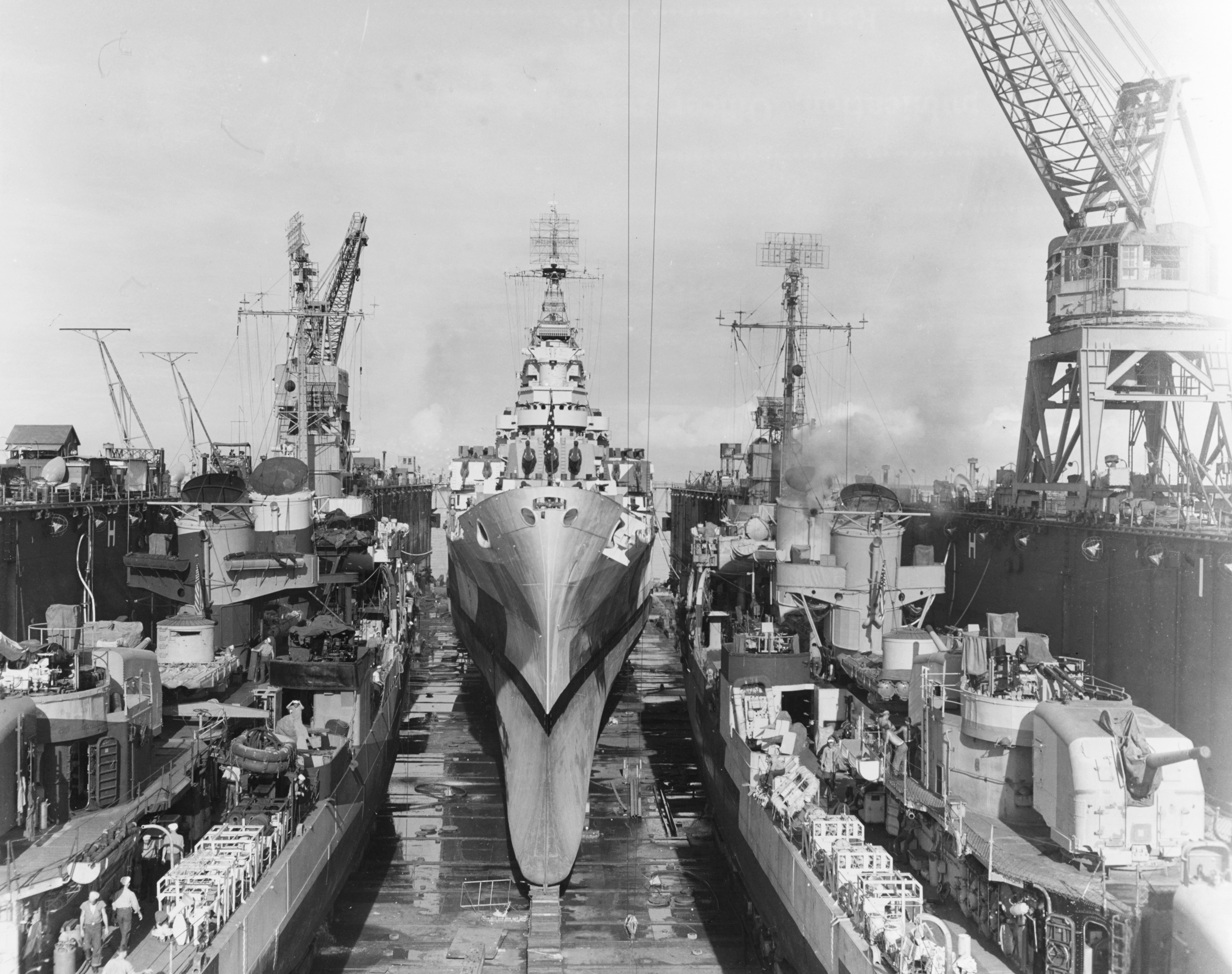
USS Claxton (DD-571), USS Canberra (CA-70) and USS Killen (DD-593) in floating dry dock ABSD-2 on 2 December 1944

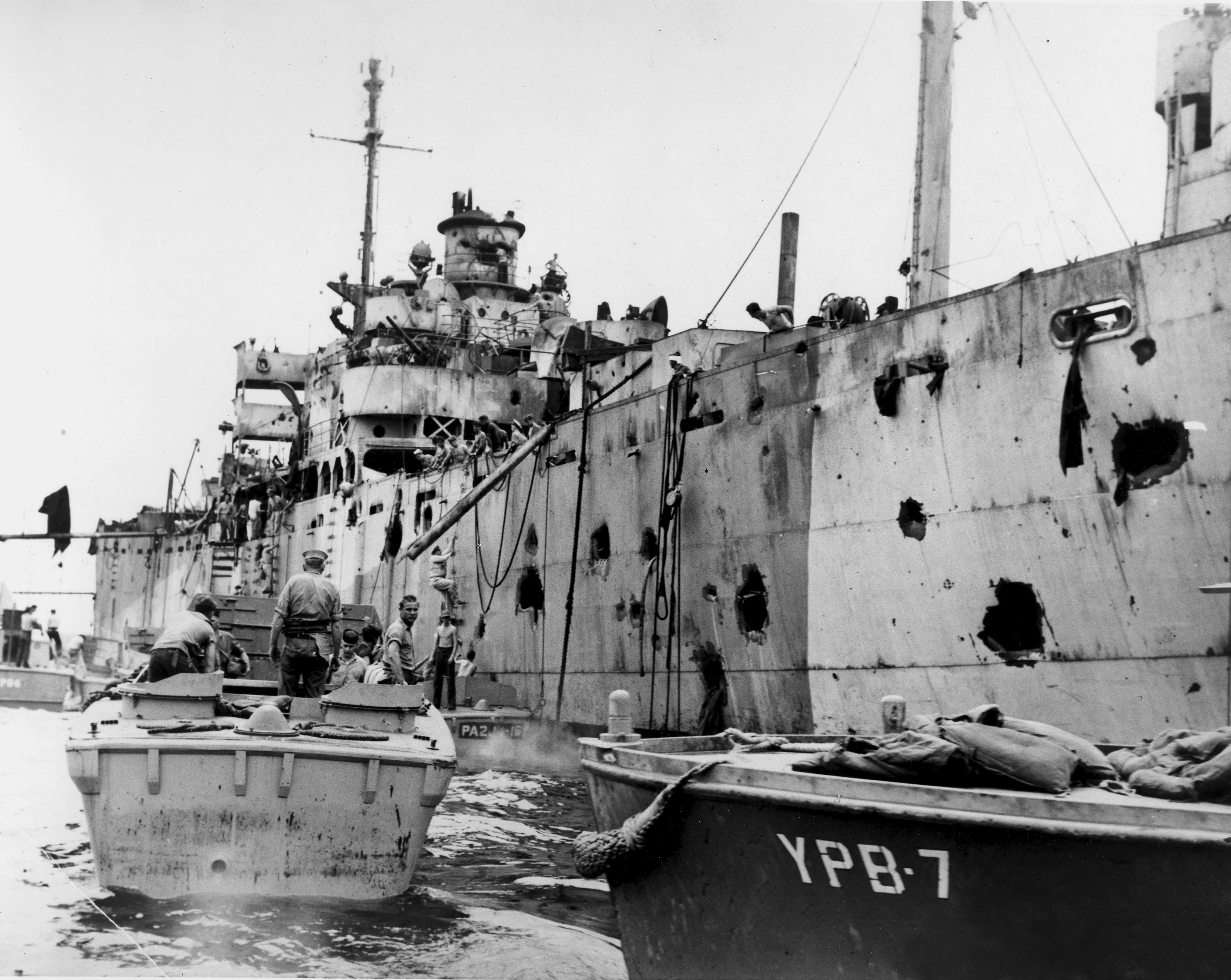
USS Mindanao (ARG-3) damaged by the explosion of USS Mount Hood (AE-11) in Seeadler Harbor on November 10, 1944

== See also ==
- List of former Royal Australian Navy bases
