= HMAS Madang =

One ship and a shore establishment of the Royal Australian Navy (RAN) have been named HMAS Madang, after Madang, Papua New Guinea.

- HMAS Madang (naval base), a base at Madang.
- HMAS Madang (P 94), an Attack-class patrol boat launched in 1968 and transferred to Papua New Guinea in 1974
