= Dreger Harbour =

Dreger Harbour at Finschhafen
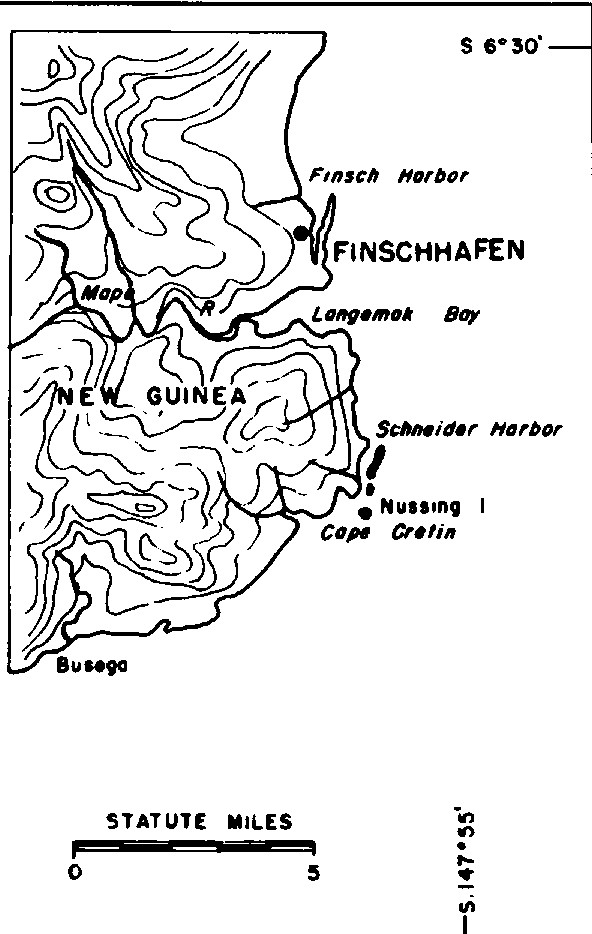
- Map of Finschhafen

- Location within Papua New Guinea
- Coordinates: 6°36′S 147°51′E
- Country: Papua New Guinea
- Province: Morobe Province
- Time zone: UTC+10 (AEST)

Dreger Harbour is a harbour south of Finschhafen, Papua New Guinea.

During World War II, Dreger Harbour was used by Allied forces after the capture of Finschhafen in October 1943. The US Navy PT Boat Advance Base Six opened in June 1944. The Seabees built a camp for 800 troops, depot, water storage, wharf, pontoon dry docks for repair work, and an engine overhaul depot. The US Navy base was called Naval Base Finschhafen built in 1943.

== See also ==
- Finschhafen District
- Finschhafen Urban LLG
- Battle of Finschhafen
- MV Rabaul Queen
