= Encounter =

Encounter or Encounters may refer to:

== Film ==
- Encounter, a 1997 Indian film by Nimmala Shankar
- Encounter (2013 film), an Indian Bengali-language film
- Encounter (2018 film), an American sci-fi film
- Encounter (2021 film), a British sci-fi film
- Encounters, a section of the Berlin International Film Festival
- Encounters (film), a 1993 Australian thriller
- Encounter: The Killing, a 2002 Indian film by Ajay Phansekar

== Television ==
- Encounter (1958 TV series), a 1958 CBC/ABC anthology television series
- Encounter (1960 TV program), a Canadian talk show television program
- Encounter (1970 TV program), a Canadian political affairs television program
- Encounters (TV series), a 1994 American television series
- Encounter (Indian TV series) (2014)
- Encounter (South Korean TV series) (2018), starring Song Hye-kyo and Park Bo-gum

== Music ==
- Encounter!, a 1968 album by Pepper Adams
- Coleman Hawkins Encounters Ben Webster or Encounters, an album by Coleman Hawkins and Ben Webster
- Encounter (Mark Holden album) (1977)
- Encounter (Michael Stearns album) (1988)
- Place Vendôme (Swingle Singers with MJQ album) or Encounter
- Encounter (Trio 3 album) (2000)
- Encounters (album), a 1984 album by Mal Waldron
- Encounters, an album by Sylvan
- "Encounter", a 2016 song by Chris Quilala from Split the Sky
- "Encounter", a song in the video game Metal Gear Solid

== Ships ==
- HMS Encounter (1846)
- HMS Encounter (1873), a wooden-screw corvette
- HMS Encounter (H10), an E-class destroyer launched in 1934
- HMAS Encounter (1902), a Challenger-class protected cruiser
- HMAS Encounter (naval base), a former naval depot in South Australia

== Other uses ==
- Encounter (psychology), an authentic, congruent meeting between individuals
- Encounter (magazine), a literary magazine
- Encounter Books, a book publisher in the United States, named after the magazine
- Encounter (game), an international network of active urban games
- Encounter! (video game), a 1983 game by Novagen
- Encounters (anthology), a 2004 anthology of speculative fiction
- Encounter (sculpture), a bronze sculpture by Bruce Beasley
- Encounter: Essays, a 2009 essay collection by Milan Kundera

== See also ==
- Close encounter, a claimed UFO sighting
- The Encounter (disambiguation)
- Encounter Bay (disambiguation)
- Encounter killing, killing in a gun fight with the police in the Indian subcontinent, sometimes an extrajudicial killing
- HMS Encounter, a list of ships
