= Langemak Bay =

Bay in New Guinea

Coordinates: 6°35′05″S 147°50′23″E

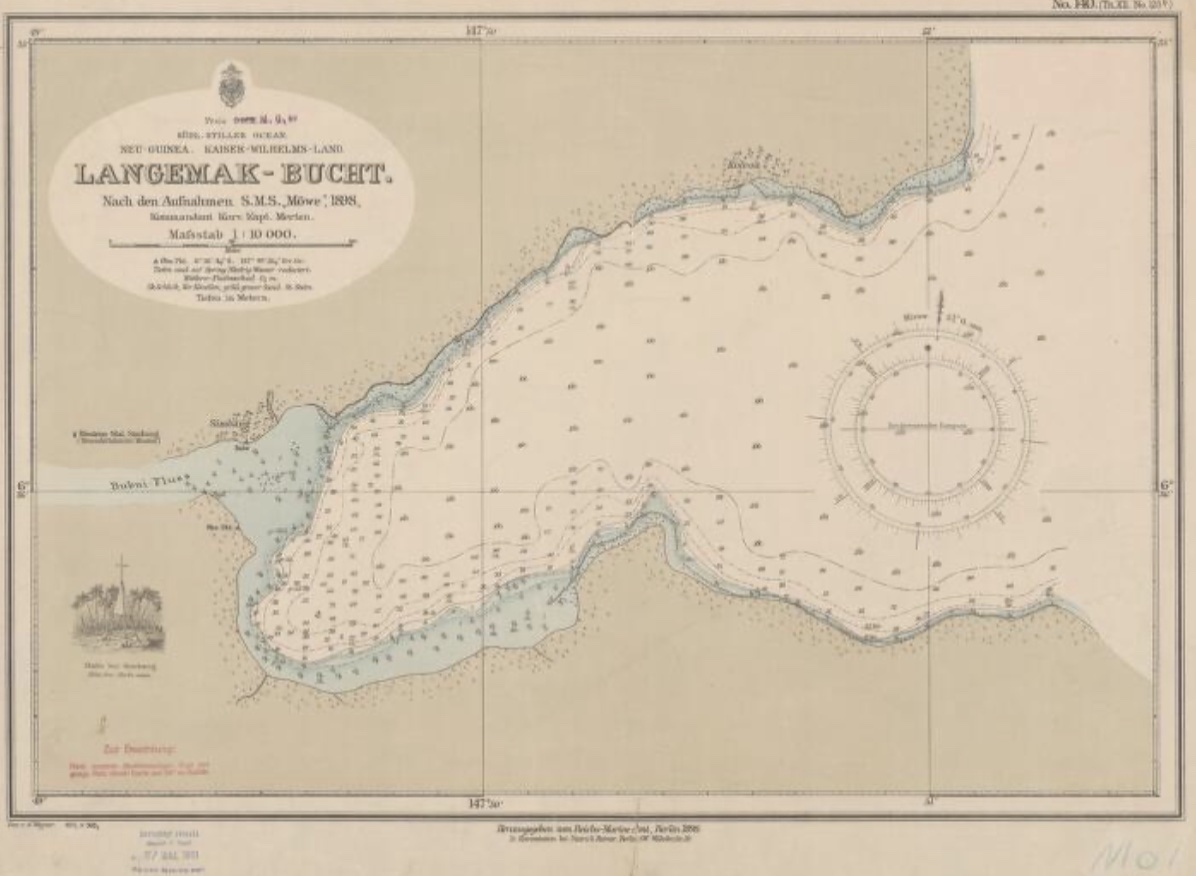
Langemak Bay (German: Langemak Bucht), as recorded by A. Wegner, published by the German Reichs-Marine-Amt (1898).

Langemak Bay (Langemark, Langemaak) is a bay north of Finschhafen, on the north east coast of Papua New Guinea. Langemak Bay saw extensive naval operations in World War II, including a landing beach at the western end of the bay for the embarkation of the 2/24th Australian Infantry Battalion. The US Navy built Naval Base Finschhafen in 1943.
