= Explorer class =

Explorer class may refer to:

Naval vessels

- Explorer-class container ship, a series of container ships operated by CMA CGM.
- Explorer-class general-purpose vessel, a class of general purpose vessels operated by the Royal Australian Navy
- Explorer-class submarine, a class of experimental submarines operated by the Royal Navy between 1958 and 1965

Fictional vessels

See also

- Navigatori-class destroyer, a class of destroyers operated by the Regia Marina (Italian Navy) between 1929 and 1954, all of which are named after Italian explorers
- Explorer (disambiguation)#Maritime vessels for individual ships carrying the name Explorer
