= HMAS Huon (naval base) =

Former shore establishment of the Royal Australian Navy in Hobart, Tasmania, Australia

- Hobart, Tasmania in Australia

Site information
- Type: Naval base
- Owner: Department of Defence
- Operator: Royal Australian Navy

Location
- Location in Tasmania
- Coordinates: 42°52′32″S 147°20′10″E

Site history
- In use: 1911 – 17 June 1994
- Fate: Decommissioned

HMAS Huon is a former Royal Australian Navy (RAN) base located in Hobart, Tasmania, Australia, in operation from 1911 to 1994.

== History ==
The RAN purchased a block of land on the west bank of the Derwent River in 1911; and commenced construction on the site in 1912.

Although completed during the 1910s, the base remained unnamed until 27 August 1939, when she was commissioned as HMAS Cerberus VI, identifying her as a subsidiary depot to the Victorian naval base HMAS Cerberus. In 1940, the decision was made to give RAN shore establishments unique names, and Cerberus VI was recommissioned on 1 August as HMAS Derwent. The base was renamed to HMAS Huon on 1 March 1942; the Royal Navy had previously commissioned the destroyer HMS Derwent, and RAN wartime policy was to avoid duplicating names with allied navies.

After World War II, Huon's status was downgraded in 1946 to a care and maintenance base. In 1960, the depot's role was expanded to become the primary support and recruitment base in Tasmania, as well as home to the Hobart Port Division of the Royal Australian Navy Reserve and the state's primary cadet training facility. From 1967 to 1982, HMAS Bass was attached to the base for Reserve training duties. She was replaced by the patrol boat HMAS Ardent, which was assigned to Huon until 1994.

On 17 June 1994, Huon was decommissioned; one of several RAN bases closed due to budget cuts.

== See also ==
- List of former Royal Australian Navy bases
