= Ballast Point =

Ballast Point may refer to:

== Places ==
=== Australia ===
- Ballast Point (New South Wales), a point in the suburb of Birchgrove in Sydney
- Ballast Point Park (New South Wales), a park in the suburb of Birchgrove in Sydney

=== United States ===
- Ballast Point Light, a lighthouse situated on Ballast Point, on Point Loma in San Diego Bay, California
- Ballast Point (Tampa), a neighborhood in the city of Tampa, Florida
- Ballast Point Park, a park in the neighborhood of Ballast Point in the city of Tampa, Florida

== Other ==
- Ballast Point Brewing Company, American brewery founded in San Diego, California
