= HMAS Encounter =

One ship and one shore establishment of the Royal Australian Navy (RAN) have been named HMAS Encounter:

- HMAS Encounter (1902), a second class protected cruiser transferred from the Royal Navy to the RAN in 1912, and decommissioned in 1929
- HMAS Encounter (naval base), a naval depot opened in South Australia as HMAS Torrens in 1940, recommissioned as Encounter in 1965, closed in 1994, and recommissioned in 2022.
