= HMAS Banks =

Vessel of the Royal Australian Navy

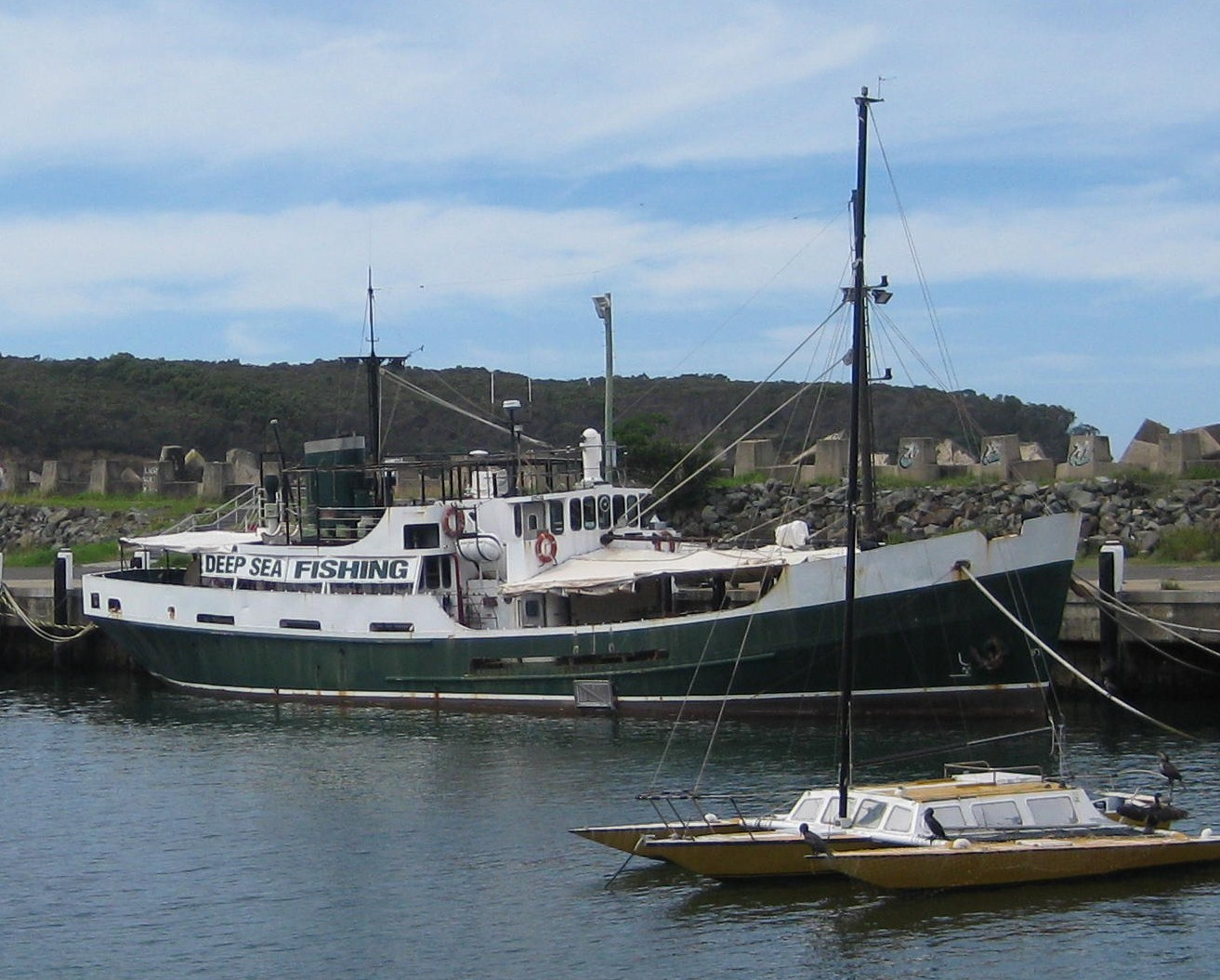
- MV Banks in 2011

History

Australia
- Namesake: Sir Joseph Banks
- Builder: Walkers Limited, Maryborough, Queensland
- Launched: 15 December 1959
- Commissioned: 16 February 1960
- Decommissioned: 17 December 1982
- Out of service: 1995
- Motto: "Integrity"
- Fate: Sold into civilian service, scrapped 2018
- Badge

General characteristics
- Class & type: Explorer class general-purpose vessel
- Displacement: 207 tonnes standard; 260 tonnes full load
- Length: 90 ft (27 m) between perpendiculars; 101 ft (31 m) overall
- Beam: 22 ft (6.7 m)
- Draught: 8 ft (2.4 m)
- Propulsion: Diesel twin screw, 342 shaft horsepower (255 kW)348
- Speed: 9 knots (17 km/h; 10 mph)
- Complement: 14
- Armament: .50 cal machine guns fitted as required

HMAS Banks (GPV 901/Y266/G244/244) was an Explorer class general-purpose vessel of the Royal Australian Navy (RAN), serving in a range of capacities from 1960 until 1995. She was named in honour of Sir Joseph Banks, the botanist aboard HM Bark Endeavour during the discovery of the eastern coast of Australia in 1770.

== Design and construction ==
The Explorer class was a two-ship class of general purpose vessels built for the RAN. The ships had a displacement of 207 tons at standard load and 260 tons at full load. Banks was 101 feet (31 m) in length overall, had a beam of 22 feet (6.7 m), and a draught of 8 feet (2.4 m). Propulsion machinery consisted of GM diesels, which supplied 348 shaft horsepower (260 kW) to the two propeller screws, and allowed the vessel to reach 9 knots (17 km/h; 10 mph). The ship's company consisted of 14 personnel. The ship's armament of light weapons were only fitted as needed.

Banks was laid down by Walkers Limited of Maryborough, Queensland in January 1959, and launched on 15 December 1959. She commissioned into the RAN on 16 February 1960 with pennant number GPV 901. Banks wore the pennant numbers GPV 901, Y266, G244, and finally 244 during her career.

== Operational history ==
On completion, Banks was initially deployed to northern Australia for fishery surveillance. In April 1961, the ship surveyed the Adelaide River area; the first seagoing ship in 50 years to make the Adelaide River passage. During 1962, Banks undertook surveys around northern Australia, then spent 1963 to 1966 in Papua New Guinea, attached to the RAN's Papua New Guinea Division and carrying a mixed Australia-PNG complement.

In late 1966, Banks returned to Sydney for a refit. On completion, she was handed over to the Royal Australian Naval Reserve on 7 July 1967 and assigned to the Port Adelaide Division as a training vessel. While here, the ship was attached to the naval base HMAS Encounter. Banks remained in South Australia until November 1982, when she was replaced by the patrol boat HMAS Aware. Banks was assigned to the Target Services Group at HMAS Creswell, Jervis Bay in December. During May 1980, Banks was used to convey the anchor stock recovered by the Society for Underwater Historical Research and others at the wreck site of Loch Vennachar from Kingscote to Port Adelaide.

=== Decommissioning and last voyage ===
On 17 December 1982, the ship was formally decommissioned, but remained in service at Jervis Bay. In 1985, Banks was reassigned to the naval base HMAS Waterhen.

In 1995, Banks left Sydney to undergo a major refit in Port Macquarie. Near the end of an 8- to 10-week refit, a fire attributed to the spontaneous combustion of oil-soaked rags severely damaged the ship. The refit was terminated, and the burned out ship was sold six months later into private hands, with the new owners refitting Banks to meet survey for charter vessels over a seven-year period. On completion, Pleasure Cruises Australasia began operating Banks out of Ulladulla, New South Wales.

The ship was resold and travelled along the NSW and QLD coasts and was in the Whitsunday Passage in March 2017 when Cyclone Debbie saw the Banks drag its anchor and found itself high and dry ashore on Whitsunday Island. She was refloated a year later at a cost of $365,000, the ship was towed to Townsville and scrapped.
