= HMAS Waratah =

- Washington, D.C., District of Columbia in United States

Site information
- Type: Naval administrative centre
- Operator: Royal Australian Navy

Site history
- In use: 1966–198?
- Fate: Decommissioned

HMAS Waratah is a former Royal Australian Navy (RAN) naval administrative centre located in Washington, D.C., United States of America. The centre was operational between 1966 and as late as 1986. It was located in the Australian Embassy on Massachusetts Avenue NW.

== See also ==
- List of former Royal Australian Navy bases
