= HMAS Gilolo =

Former Royal Australian Navy base in Indonesia

- Gililo (now Halmahera), Maluku Islands in Dutch East Indies (now Indonesia)

Site information
- Type: Naval base
- Operator: Royal Australian Navy

Site history
- Fate: Closed
- Battles/wars: The Pacific War of World War II; Dutch East Indies campaign

HMAS Gilolo is a former Royal Australian Navy (RAN) shore naval base on Gililo (now Halmahera), in the Maluku Islands, Dutch East Indies (now Indonesia).

== See also ==
- List of former Royal Australian Navy bases
- Japanese occupation of the Dutch East Indies
