= The Encounter =

The Encounter may refer to:

== Film and TV ==
- The Encounter (2002 film), a film by Ömer Kavur
- The Encounter (2011 film), a Christian film directed by David A.R. White
- "The Encounter" (Twilight Zone), a 1964 Twilight Zone episode

== Books ==
- The Encounter «Встреча», 1923 poem by Vladimir Nabokov
- "The Encounter" (short story), a 1969 short story by Jorge Luis Borges
- The Encounter (novel), a 1996 Animorphs book

== Music ==
- "The Encounter", an art song by John Ireland
- "The Encounter", an art song by Toru Takemitsu

== Other ==
- The Encounter (prison)

== See also ==
- Encounter (disambiguation)
