= HMAS Carpentaria =

- Thursday Island, Torres Strait Islands, Queensland in Australia

Site information
- Type: Naval base
- Operator: Royal Australian Navy

Location
- Location off the coast of Queensland
- Coordinates: 10°34′44″S 142°13′12″E

Site history
- Fate: Decommissioned

HMAS Carpentaria is a former Royal Australian Navy (RAN) base that was located on Thursday Island, part of the Torres Strait Islands in Queensland, Australia. As of May 1945, three of the twenty Australian Rendering Mines Safe (RMS) personnel were located at Carpentaria.

== See also ==
- List of former Royal Australian Navy bases
