= HMAS Magnetic =

- Townsville, Queensland in Australia

Site information
- Type: Naval base
- Operator: Royal Australian Navy

HMAS Magnetic is a former Royal Australian Navy (RAN) base located in Townsville, Queensland, Australia.

== See also ==
- List of former Royal Australian Navy bases
