= HMAS Commonwealth =

Disused Australian naval base in Kure, Japan

- Kure, Hiroshima in Japan

Site information
- Type: Naval base
- Operator: Royal Navy (?? – 1 October 1948); Royal Australian Navy (1 October 1948 – June 1950); Japan Maritime Self-Defense Force (June 1950 – 28 April 1952); Republic of Korea Navy (28 April 1952 – 9 April 1956)

Site history
- Fate: Closed

HMAS Commonwealth is a former Royal Australian Navy shore base located in Kure, Hiroshima in Japan. The base had been run by the British as HMS Commonwealth, and was renamed HMAS Commonwealth on 1 October 1948. It ceased operation in June 1950, at which time the base was transferred to Japanese control. HMAS Commonwealth (Establishment) was transferred to Korea on 28 April 1952, where it continued until 19 April 1956.

== See also ==
- List of former Royal Australian Navy bases
