= Explorer-class general-purpose vessel =

Two-ship class of general purpose vessels

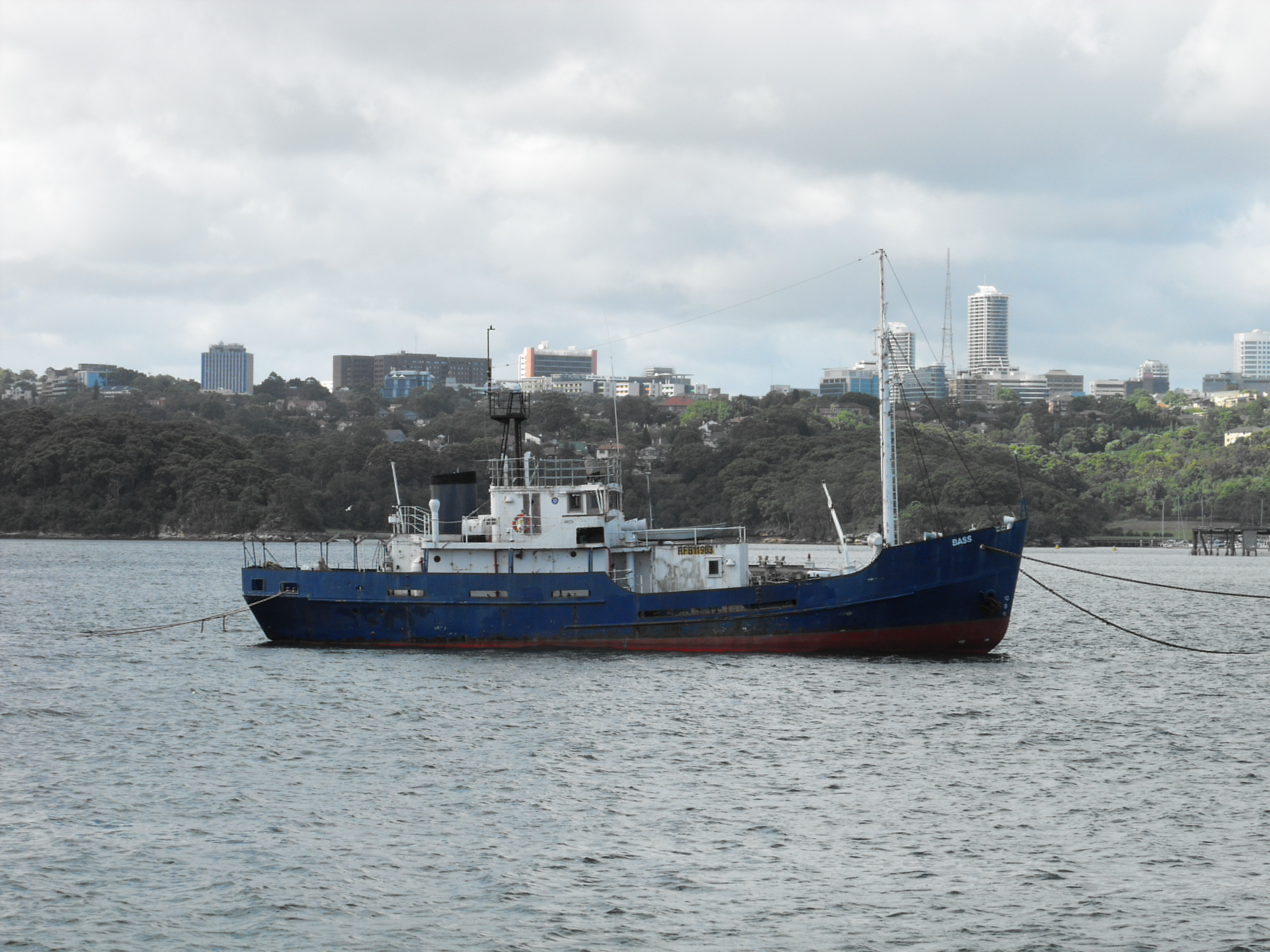
- MV Bass moored off Ballast Point in 2012

Class overview
- Name: Explorer
- Builders: Walkers Limited, Maryborough, Queensland
- Operators: Royal Australian Navy
- Built: 1959-1960
- In service: 1960 to 1995
- In commission: 1960-1982
- Completed: 2
- Active: 0

General characteristics
- Type: General Purpose Vessel
- Displacement: 207 tonnes standard; 260 tonnes full load
- Length: 90 ft (27 m) between perpendiculars; 101 ft (31 m) overall
- Beam: 22 ft (6.7 m)
- Draught: 8 ft (2.4 m)
- Propulsion: Diesel twin screw, 342 shaft horsepower (255 kW)
- Speed: 9 knots (17 km/h; 10 mph)
- Complement: 14
- Armament: .50 cal machine guns fitted as required

The Explorer class was a two-ship class of general purpose vessels of the Royal Australian Navy that served between 1960 and 1995.

== Design ==
The Explorer class was a two-ship class of general purpose vessels built for the RAN. The ships had a displacement of 207 tons at standard load and 260 tons at full load. Each was 90 feet (27 m) long between perpendiculars and 101 feet (31 m) long overall, had a beam of 22 feet (6.7 m), and a draught of 8 feet (2.4 m). Propulsion machinery consisted of GM diesels, which supplied 348 shaft horsepower (260 kW) to the two propeller screws, and allowed the vessel to reach 9 knots (17 km/h; 10 mph). The ship's company consisted of 14 personnel. The ship's armament of light weapons (usually .50 calibre machine guns) were only fitted as needed.

The two vessel, HMAS Bass and HMAS Banks, were built by Walkers Limited of Maryborough, Queensland. Both were laid down in 1959, and were commissioned into the RAN in 1960.

== Operational history ==
The Explorers' primary roles were hydrographic survey and reservist training, among other duties.

In December 1982, both vessels were decommissioned. Despite this, they remained active in training until the mid-1990s.

== Ships ==
- HMAS Bass - Sold 1994.
- HMAS Banks - Sold 1995.
