= HMAS Lusair =

- Torokina, Bougainville Island in Papua New Guinea

Site information
- Type: Naval base
- Operator: Royal Australian Navy

HMAS Lusair is a former Royal Australian Navy (RAN) base located at Torokina, on Bougainville Island, Papua New Guinea.

== See also ==
- List of former Royal Australian Navy bases
