= HMAS Basilisk =

Royal Australian Navy naval base

- Port Moresby in Papua New Guinea
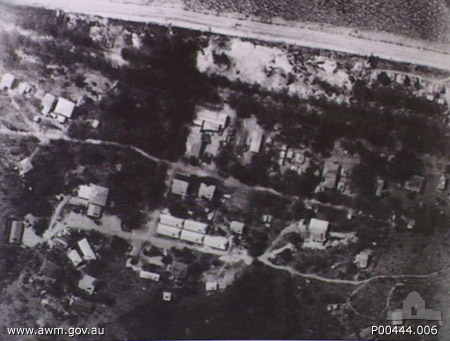
- Aerial Photo of HMAS Basilisk

Site information
- Type: Naval base
- Operator: Royal Australian Navy (1943-1967);Royal Australian Navy (1967-1983)

Site history
- In use: 1 January 1943 – 17 December 1945; 14 November 1974 – 1983;
- Fate: Decommissioned

HMAS Basilisk is a former Royal Australian Navy (RAN) shore naval base, located in Port Moresby, Papua New Guinea.

== History ==
The first RAN naval base in Papua New Guinea, the base was commissioned on 1 January 1943 under the command of Commander R.B.A. Hunt RAN, who was previously the Naval Officer in Charge Port Moresby. Hunt was the hydrographic surveyor who had surveyed Port Moresby.

Basilisk was paid off on 17 December 1945.

HMAS Basilisk was re-commissioned under CMDR P. Paffard, RAN on 14 November 1974 to provide administrative support for RAN personnel serving with the Papua New Guinea Defence Force.

The naval base was finally decommissioned in 1983.

== See also ==
- List of former Royal Australian Navy bases
- Pacific War
