= HMAS Bass =

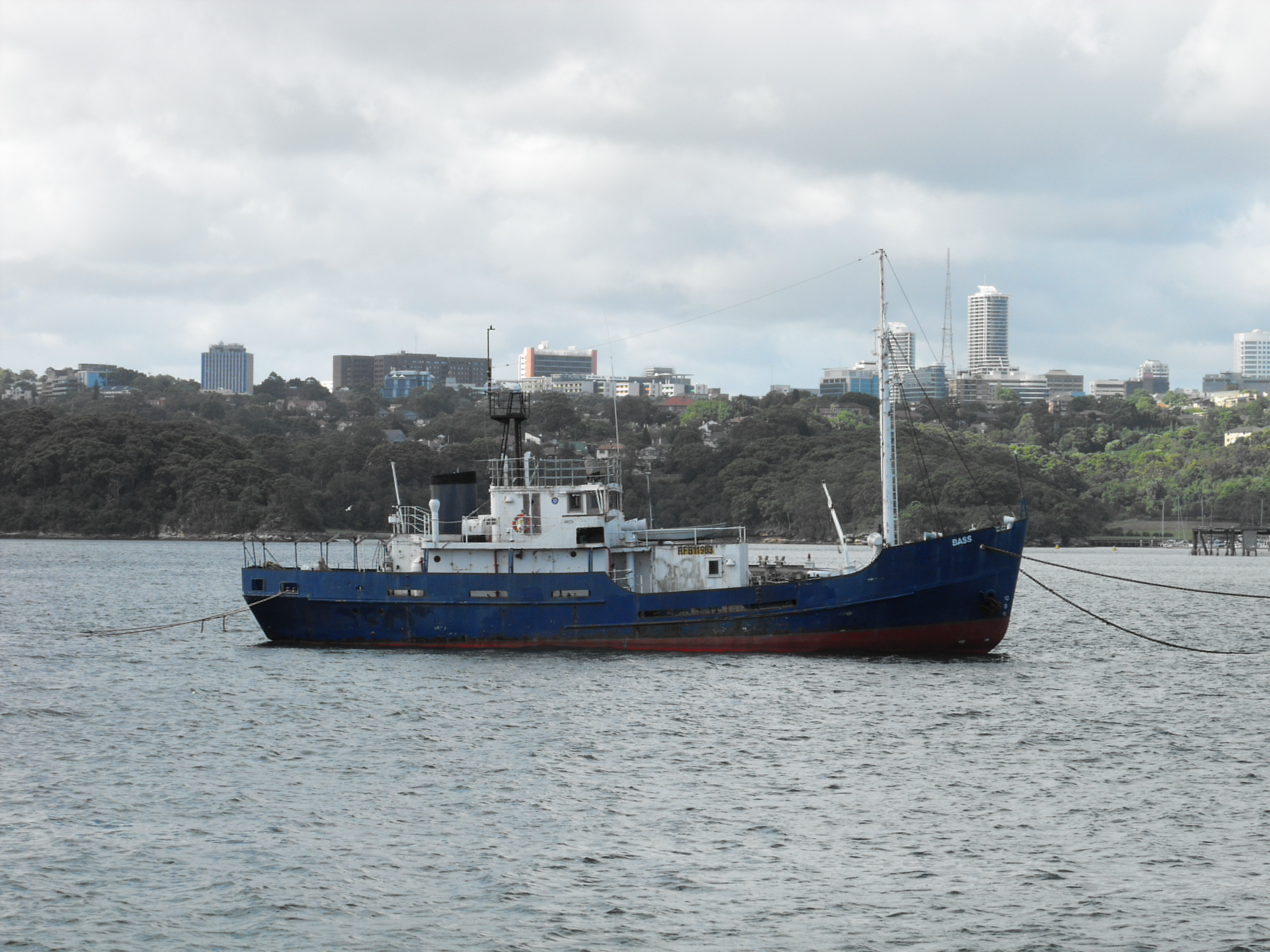
- MV Bass moored off Ballast Point in 2012

History

Australia
- Builder: Walkers Limited, Maryborough, Queensland
- Laid down: May 1959
- Launched: 28 March 1960
- Commissioned: 15 November 1960
- Decommissioned: 17 December 1982
- Out of service: 1994
- Status: In civilian service
- Badge

General characteristics
- Class & type: Explorer class general-purpose vessel
- Displacement: 207 tonnes standard; 260 tonnes full load
- Length: 90 ft (27 m) between perpendiculars; 101 ft (31 m) overall
- Beam: 22 ft (6.7 m)
- Draught: 8 ft (2.4 m)
- Propulsion: Diesel twin screw, 342 shaft horsepower (255 kW)
- Speed: 9 knots (17 km/h; 10 mph)
- Complement: 14
- Armament: .50 cal machine guns fitted as required

HMAS Bass (GPV 902) was an Explorer class general-purpose vessel of the Royal Australian Navy (RAN), serving in a range of capacities from 1960 until 1994.

== Design and construction ==
The Explorer class was a two-ship class of general-purpose vessels built for the RAN. The ships had a displacement of 207 tons at standard load and 260 tons at full load. Bass was 101 feet (31 m) in length overall, had a beam of 22 feet (6.7 m), and a draught of 8 feet (2.4 m). Propulsion machinery consisted of GM diesels, which supplied 348 shaft horsepower (260 kW) to the two propeller screws, and allowed the vessel to reach 9 knots (17 km/h; 10 mph). The ship's company consisted of 14 personnel. The ship's armament of light weapons (two .303 Bren guns) were only fitted as needed.

Bass was laid down by Walkers Limited of Maryborough, Queensland in May 1959. She was commissioned into the RAN on 15 November 1960.

== Operational history ==
From 1963, Bass operated with the coastwatchers organisation.

By July 1967, the ship had been assigned to Hobart for hydrographic survey duties, and for service as a training vessel to the Royal Australian Navy Reserve Port Division based there. She continued in this role until June 1982, when she was replaced by the patrol boat HMAS Ardent. In July, Bass relocated to HMAS Waterhen, to provide navigational training to personnel at that base.

On 17 December, Bass was formally decommissioned, but remained in service as Waterhen's training vessel. In October 1985, Bass was reassigned to the Darwin Port Division of the Royal Australian Navy Reserve.

In 1994, Bass was paid off and sold. The vessel entered civilian service as MV Bass.

Civilian owners have included Sydney underworld and Harbour and foreshore identities, John Giddens, Jeff Devine and Danny Black.
