= Encounter Bay (disambiguation) =

Encounter Bay is a large bay on the south coast of Australia.

Encounter Bay may also refer to:

- Encounter Bay, South Australia, a locality in the City of Victor Harbor
  - Encounter Bay Football Club, an Australian Rules football club in South Australia
- Electoral district of Encounter Bay, a former electoral district in South Australia
- District Council of Encounter Bay, a former local government area in South Australia which merged to form the City of Victor Harbor
- Hundred of Encounter Bay, a cadastral unit in South Australia

== See also ==
- Encounter (disambiguation)
