= HMAS Kuranda =

WWII-era Royal Australian Navy base

- Cairns, Queensland in Australia

Site information
- Type: Naval base
- Operator: Royal Australian Navy

Site history
- In use: 1943
- Fate: Decommissioned
- Battles/wars: Pacific War of World War II

HMAS Kuranda is a former Royal Australian Navy (RAN) base located in Cairns, Queensland, in Australia that was used during the Pacific War of World War II.

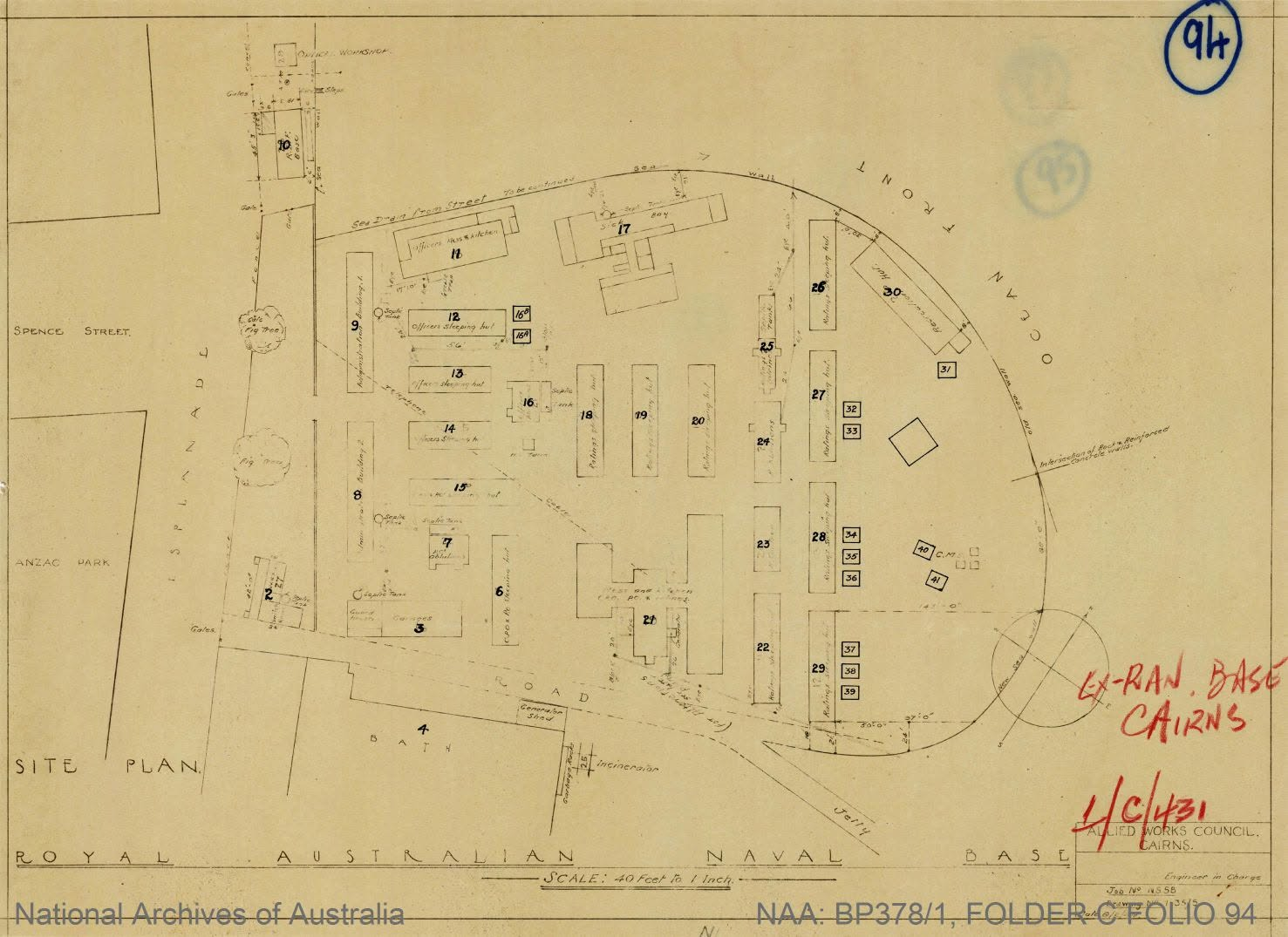
A site plan of HMAS Kuranda

== See also ==
- List of former Royal Australian Navy bases
