= MV Rabaul Queen =

Passenger ferry that sank in 2012

Coordinates: 6°31′05″S 147°59′07″E

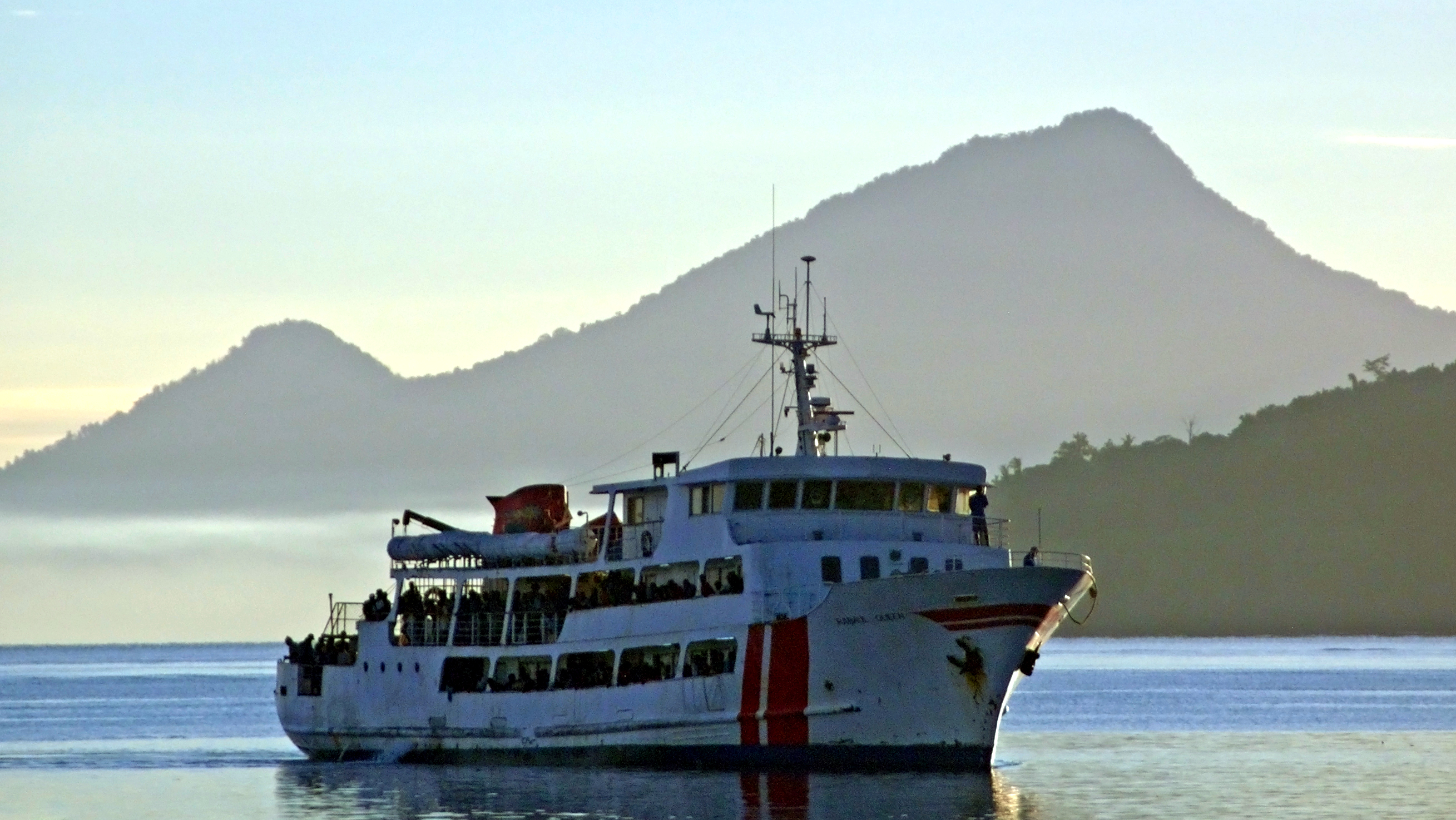
- MV Rabaul Queen arriving at Kimbe Port in 2009

History
- Name: Rabaul Queen
- Owner: Rabaul Shipping
- Operator: Star Ships
- Port of registry: Papua New Guinea
- Route: Kimbe—Lae
- Completed: 1983
- Out of service: 2 February 2012
- Identification: IMO number: 8351297; Call sign: P2V4040
- Fate: Sank 2 February 2012

General characteristics
- Type: Passenger ferry
- Tonnage: 259 GT
- Length: 155 ft (47 m)
- Capacity: 310 passengers (permitted)
- Crew: 12

MV Rabaul Queen, en route from Kimbe to Lae, sank approximately 9 nautical miles (16 km) off Finschhafen

MV Rabaul Queen was a passenger ferry owned by the Papua New Guinea company Rabaul Shipping. The ship, built in Japan in 1983, operated on short runs in that country, before being brought to Papua New Guinea in 1998 and plying a regular weekly route between Kimbe, the capital of West New Britain, and Lae, the capital of the mainland province of Morobe.

In the early hours of 2 February 2012, the ferry capsized and later sank in rough conditions. The final death toll is unknown because the exact number of passengers is unknown; estimates range from 88 to 223, with the official Commission of Inquiry estimating the dead at 146 to 165.

== Capsize and sinking ==
=== Incident ===
Early in the morning of 2 February 2012, the ship capsized due to rough conditions in the Solomon Sea. The ship was hit by three large waves. About four hours later, at approximately 6:00 am local time (8:00 pm on 1 February UTC), she sank 9 nautical miles (16 km) from Finschhafen. She was near the end of her 20-hour journey from Kimbe to Lae. 12 crew and an estimated 350 passengers were aboard at the time, though it is possible there may have been more than 500 passengers on the ferry.

=== Rescue and recovery ===
A joint rescue effort by Papua New Guinea and Australia was formed shortly after the sinking. Many survivors were rescued by six merchant vessels alerted by the Australian Maritime Safety Authority (AMSA), which was alerted by Rabaul Shipping that the ferry had disappeared from a satellite tracking system. Seven fixed wing aircraft, including a P-3 Orion maritime patrol aircraft from the Royal Australian Air Force, three helicopters and seven boats were involved in locating survivors. Heavy seas and high winds complicated the search and rescue operations.

246 survivors were rescued by nightfall on 2 February. As of 5 February 2012, the bodies of six victims had been recovered, and no further survivors were rescued. Over 100 remained missing. It was reported that 27 survivors were on an uninhabited island; one survivor contacted a family member with a cell phone, although Papua New Guinea's Maritime Safety Authority claimed on 5 February that any survivors would already have been located. On 10 February 2012, Radio New Zealand reported that the number of people rescued had been re-calculated as 237, and that the number of people missing (based on new information from relatives of those onboard) was 321. This would indicate that some 558 people were aboard the vessel, although it was only permitted to carry 310.

Seven of the survivors, three of whom had serious injuries, were admitted to Angau Memorial Hospital in Lae. Some of the survivors experienced stomach pains because they swallowed seawater containing oil leaking from the boat.

Attempts were made to determine the names of all victims, including "a public appeal for family and friends to come forward." However, an exact list was deemed impossible because of incomplete manifests, poor record-keeping, lack of identification upon boarding, and the local tradition of using multiple names.

== Investigation ==
A Commission of Inquiry was set up on 10 February 2012. Under the leadership of Judge Warwick Andrew, the Commission was charged with determining the cause of the disaster, reasons for the high loss of life, any crimes or civil wrongs, and recommendations for preventing another occurrence. The Commission spent several months hearing evidence from survivors, rescuers, weather experts, and other witnesses.

The Commission submitted its final report to caretaker Prime Minister Peter O'Neill on 28 June 2012. O'Neill said that the 200-page report would first need to be tabled in parliament before its release and would thus have to wait for the new parliament to sit following the 2012 general election.

=== Final report ===
Rabaul Queen had passed her annual survey and "been deemed to be seaworthy for normal operations". However, the crew were found to be uncertified and unqualified, including the ship's navigational and engineering officers, and inadequate background checks had been performed before hiring. The captain's understanding of ship stability was "incorrect" and not sufficient for command of a ship. In addition, the crew did not wear uniforms, which impeded the passengers' ability to appeal for help in an emergency.

Rabaul Queen was also found to be overloaded. According to its certification, the ship was fit to carry 310 persons with a maximum of 295 passengers. However, the managing director of Rabaul Shipping, Peter Sharp, had directed his captains to carry 350 passengers and the ship "routinely" took aboard passengers in excess of 295. The Commission set the number of people on board at the time of the accident at between 392 and 411, of whom 369 to 384 were ticketed passengers, about 11 were unticketed infants, and 16 were crew. With 246 people surviving, the Commission determined that 4 dead were recovered plus between 142 and 161 people were "considered to be missing and presumed dead", for a total death of 146 to 165. The actual number is unknown, because a shipping manifest was not completed.

The Report criticized Rabaul Shipping's policies and Papua New Guinea's oversight of maritime operation. Despite recommendations from the International Maritime Organization regarding safety of life at sea, PNG regulations did not require a safety management plan. Rabaul Shipping had no emergency response plan, and their thin Floating Staff Handbook contained "nothing that provides guidance to the crews of Rabaul Shipping ships in relation to passenger welfare on board the ships" and was "deficient in almost every aspect". Information that was in the Handbook, such as life jacket drills demonstrations after leaving every port, were ignored by crew according to testifying survivors. Survivors also testified that "life jackets were padlocked in a wire cage" or were stored in locked cabinets. The "appalling and inhumane conditions" of the passengers aboard was blamed on Captain Sharp. The Papua New Guinea National Maritime Safety Authority showed "very poor corporate governance", "a high level of incompetence", and a history of "ineffectiveness". In all, the Commission's report provided 34 proposals that would "promote maritime safety", including new safety regulations, better staffing and equipment for a coordinated rescue center, and improved weather reliability and reporting for shipping.

== Legal action ==
Four people were charged in connection with the sinking: the managing director of Rabaul Shipping, Peter Sharp; the captain of the vessel, Anthony Tsiau; chief mate Michael Zirau; and the former manager of the port, Grace Amen. They faced 172 counts of manslaughter and 1 criminal charge of "sending an unseaworthy vessel out to sea". Charges against a fifth person, National Maritime Safety Authority manager Joseph Titus Kabiu, were dropped because of insufficient evidence.

The trial began in April 2016. The case against Zirau was dropped. Sharp's solicitors presented a manifest to show that only 88 people could have died, and the number of manslaughter charges were reduced to 88. Sharp and Tsiau were acquitted of the manslaughter charges, after the court ruled that the State had failed to prove there was any risk associated with the normal use of the ship. Amen will be tried separately for manslaughter.

As of October 2018, the status of criminal charges for "sending an unseaworthy vessel out to sea" are unclear. The trial had been set for March 2018, but news outlets reported in October 2018 that the public prosecutor had dropped charges against the three (owner Sharp, captain Tsiau, and port manager Amen). Shortly thereafter, however, the country's attorney general Davis Steven allegedly "promised to use his powers to re-open investigations" into the disaster, stating that "I assure you that the matter is under scrutiny."
