= ANGAU General Hospital =

ANGAU Hospital
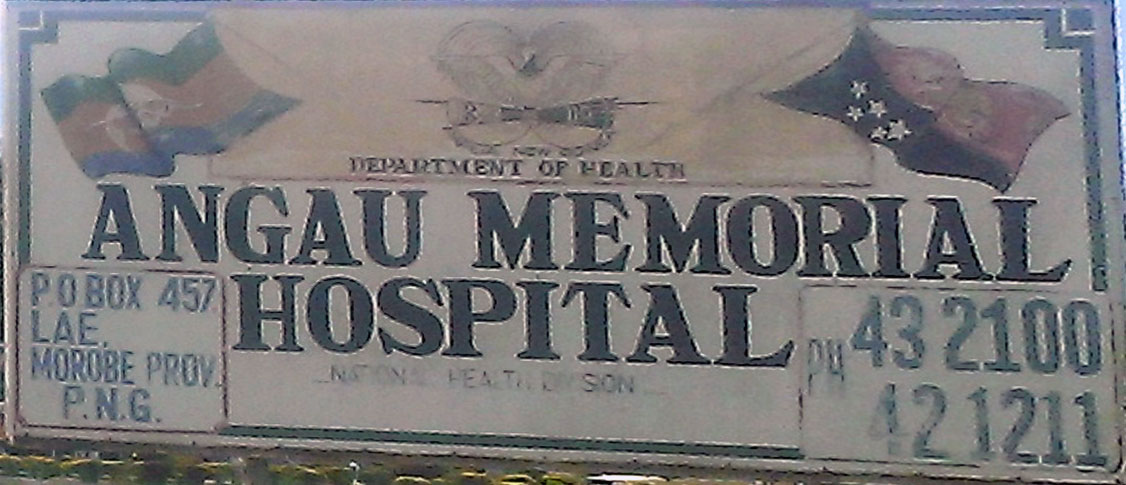

Geography
- Location: P.O. Box 457 Lae 411, Momase Region, Morobe, Papua New Guinea
- Coordinates: 06°43′36″S 146°59′47″E

Services
- Beds: 500

ANGAU Memorial Hospital is a major hospital in Lae, Papua New Guinea. Named after an Australian Army unit that was responsible for the civil administration of the Territory of Papua and the Mandated Territory of New Guinea, the hospital provides in-patient and specialist medical services to people in the Sepik, Madang and Morobe provinces. In 2013–14, the Australian government announced that it would contribute to the hospital's redevelopment as part of a deal with the PNG government relating to the resettlement of asylum seekers.

== Nomenclature ==
ANGAU stands for the Australian New Guinea Administrative Unit, which was an Australian Army unit that was formed on 21 March 1942 during World War II and was responsible for the civil administration of the Territory of Papua and the Mandated Territory of New Guinea. Following Japan's entry in the war, the civil administration of both Papua and the Mandated Territory of New Guinea was taken over by an Australian Army military government and came under the control of ANGAU from February 1942 until the end of World War II.

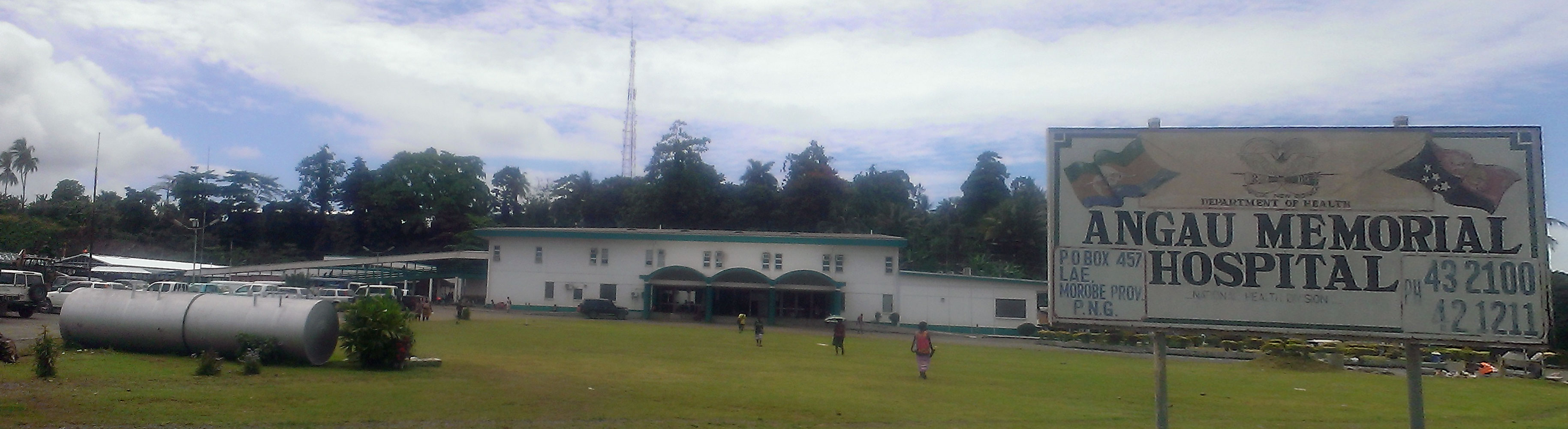
Panoramic photo of ANGAU Memorial Hospital, Markham Rd, Lae, 25 September 2014

== History ==
During World War II, the 2/7 Australian General Hospital (2/7 AGH) was established at Lae to provide medical services to Allied military forces. The military base hospital was described in July 1945 in an article in The Mail, as a 1,200-bed base hospital with "many attractive gardens which are gay with native plants and shrubs". After the war, there were plans to construct a new hospital in the area to meet the medical needs of the local population, but these were initially met with opposition by the Lae Advisory Council, as reported in the Queensland Times in July 1951: "The Lae Advisory Council has recommended that the new European and native hospitals be retained as separate entities. Separate wards be used for Europeans and Asiatics or mixed bloods."

Nevertheless, the plans went ahead and in 1963, a report to the United Nations detailed an increase in the works budget for the administration of the Territory of New Guinea to £680,756, which included the construction of the ANGAU Memorial Hospital as a replacement to the wartime Lae base hospital.

The ANGAU Memorial Hospital was officially opened on 17 April with accommodation for 412 in-patients and to provide specialist services to 620,000 people of the Sepik, Madang and Morobe provinces and cost £621,000.

== Medical research ==
A retrospective study was carried out on Ewing's sarcoma between 1973 and 1987 at the Cancer Treatment Centre of the hospital.

== Redevelopment ==
In September 2013, it was reported that the hospital had deteriorated over the last 20 years and that its buildings had become infested with termites. The renovation of the hospital is a core condition of the asylum-seeker deal between Australia and PNG made on 19 July 2013. ANGAU has only 12 of the 32 specialists it needs, and just 55 per cent of its 729 total staff.

In February 2014, the Australian Minister for Foreign Affairs, Julie Bishop, stated: "The Australian Government has committed to redevelop the ANGAU Hospital. The original hospital is now 50 years old. It was built in 1964 and is run down, it has been attacked by termites over time, there is asbestos in the building, so we need to work very hard to lift the standards to something that is world class."

Over K300 million has been invested in the redevelopment of Angau, including the master plan and 50 percent of the capital cost of renovation works. It will take two years to plan and design the new Angau hospital, while the major construction work will commence in 2016–17.

== Alumni ==
- 1964: James William McKay, MBBS, DTM&H, DPH, Dip Ed, FRACGP (Medical Superintendent)
- 1952–72: Arthur Kenneth (Ken) Jones MBE (Manager of the Artificial Limb Clinic)
