= HMAS Madang (naval base) =

HMAS Lusair
- Madang in Papua New Guinea

Site information
- Type: Naval base
- Operator: Royal Australian Navy

HMAS Madang is a former Royal Australian Navy (RAN) base located at Madang in Papua New Guinea.

== See also ==
- List of former Royal Australian Navy bases
