= Finschhafen Urban LLG =

Local-level government in Papua New Guinea

- Country: Papua New Guinea
- Province: Morobe Province
- Time zone: UTC+10 (AEST)

Finschhafen Urban LLG is a local-level government (LLG) of Morobe Province, Papua New Guinea.

== Wards ==
- 83. Finschhafen Urban
