= Encounter (1970 TV program) =

- Genre: Political affairs
- Country of origin: Canada
- Original language: English
- No. of seasons: 4

Production
- Producers: Cameron Graham (1970–1973); Gordon Cunningham (1974)
- Running time: 24–30 minutes

Original release
- Network: CBC Television
- Release: 3 January 1970 – 5 September 1974

Encounter is a Canadian political affairs television program that aired on CBC Television from 1970 to 1974.

== Premise ==
Canadian political figures were interviewed by a panel of journalists in each episode. In the early years of the program, the panel consisted of Ron Collister, Charles Lynch, and a visitor. In 1974, Collister and Lynch were replaced by Doug Collins and Elizabeth Gray. Guest politicians included Edgar Benson, Réal Caouette, Tommy Douglas, David Lewis, Peter Lougheed, Bryce Mackasey, Lester Pearson, Mitchell Sharp, Robert Stanfield and Pierre Trudeau.

Previously, the CBC conducted political interviews on Press Conference.

== Scheduling ==
This half-hour program was broadcast from 1970 to 1974 as follows:

Day	Time	Season run
Saturdays	6:06 p.m. (24 minutes)	3 January to 1 October 1970
Thursdays	10:30 p.m.	1 October 1970 to 30 September 1971
Sundays	4:00 p.m.	23 January to 29 June 1972
Thursdays	10:30 p.m.	29 June 1972 to 20 September 1973
Thursdays	10:30 p.m.	11 July to 5 September 1974
