= Ballast Point (New South Wales) =

Park in Sydney, Australia

Ballast Point Park
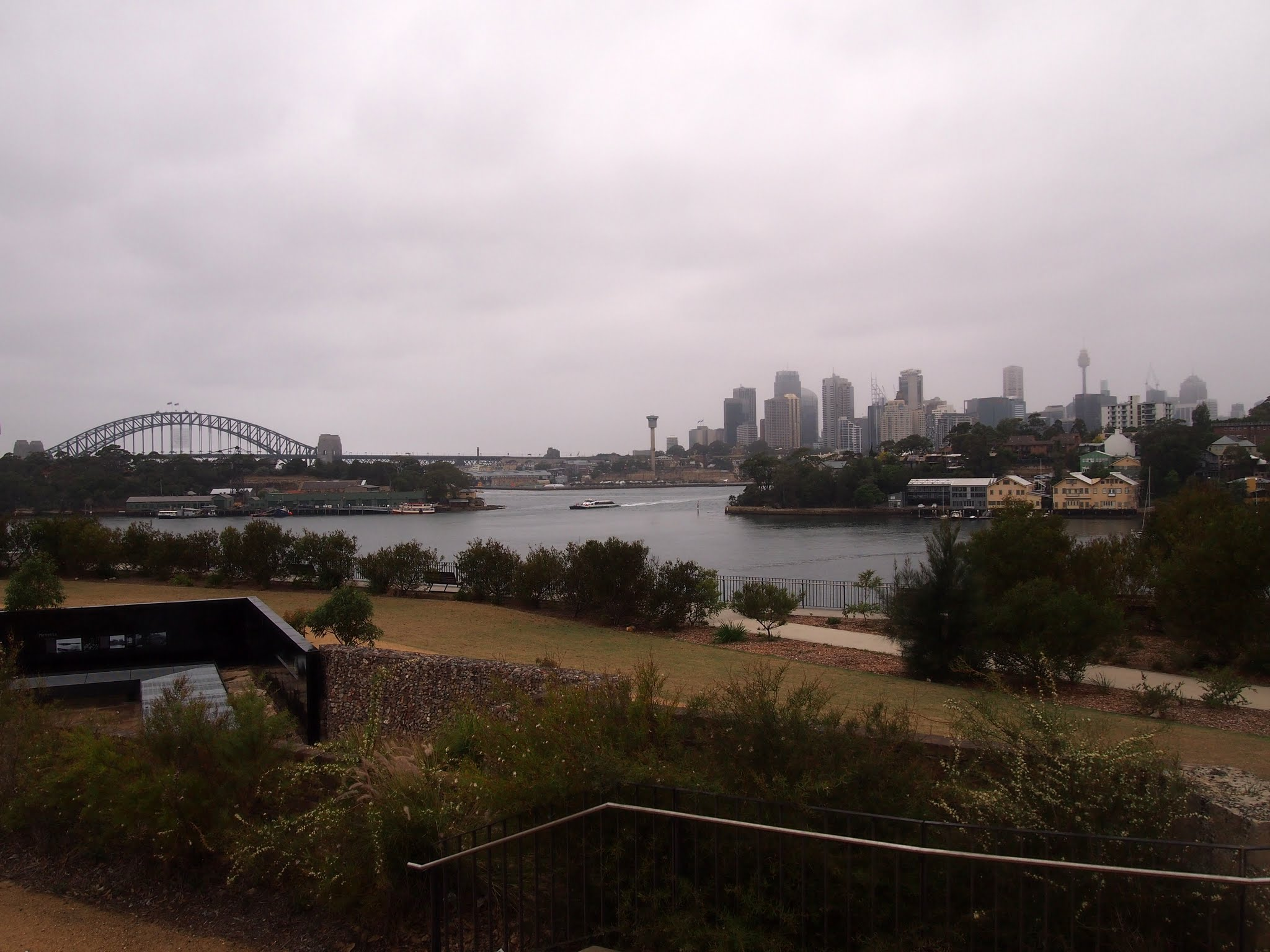
- Ballast Point, pictured in 2013
- Interactive map of Ballast Point Park
- Type: Urban park
- Location: Ballast Point Road, Birchgrove, Inner West Council, Sydney, New South Wales, Australia
- Coordinates: 33°51′09″S 151°11′22″E
- Area: 2.6 hectares (6.4 acres)
- Created: 11 July 2009
- Operator: Inner West Council
- Open: 24 hours
- Status: Open all year
- Website: www.innerwest.nsw.gov.au/explore/parks-sport-and-recreation/parks-and-playgrounds/parks-by-suburb/birchgrove-parks/ballast-point-park

Ballast Point is a 2.6-hectare (6-acre) urban park located in Birchgrove at the tip of the Balmain Peninsula in the Inner West Council local government area in Sydney, New South Wales, Australia. The park is located adjacent to the point of the same name, situated between Snails Bay and Mort Bay in Sydney Harbour.

== History ==
Between 1788 and 1800, the point was used as a fishing and hunting ground for European settlers and as a source of ballast for ships returning unladen to Europe, hence the name Ballast Point. In 1800 the point was part of a 223-hectare (550-acre) grant to colonial surgeon Dr William Balmain (1762–1803) made by Governor John Hunter. A year later, Balmain sold his entire holding to John Gilchrist for five shillings and the area then became known as Gilchrist's place. In 1833, Gilchrist transferred power of attorney to Frederick Parbury who, three years later, commissioned surveyor John Armstrong to lay out sub divisions. This survey formed the basis of sales between 1836 and 1841.

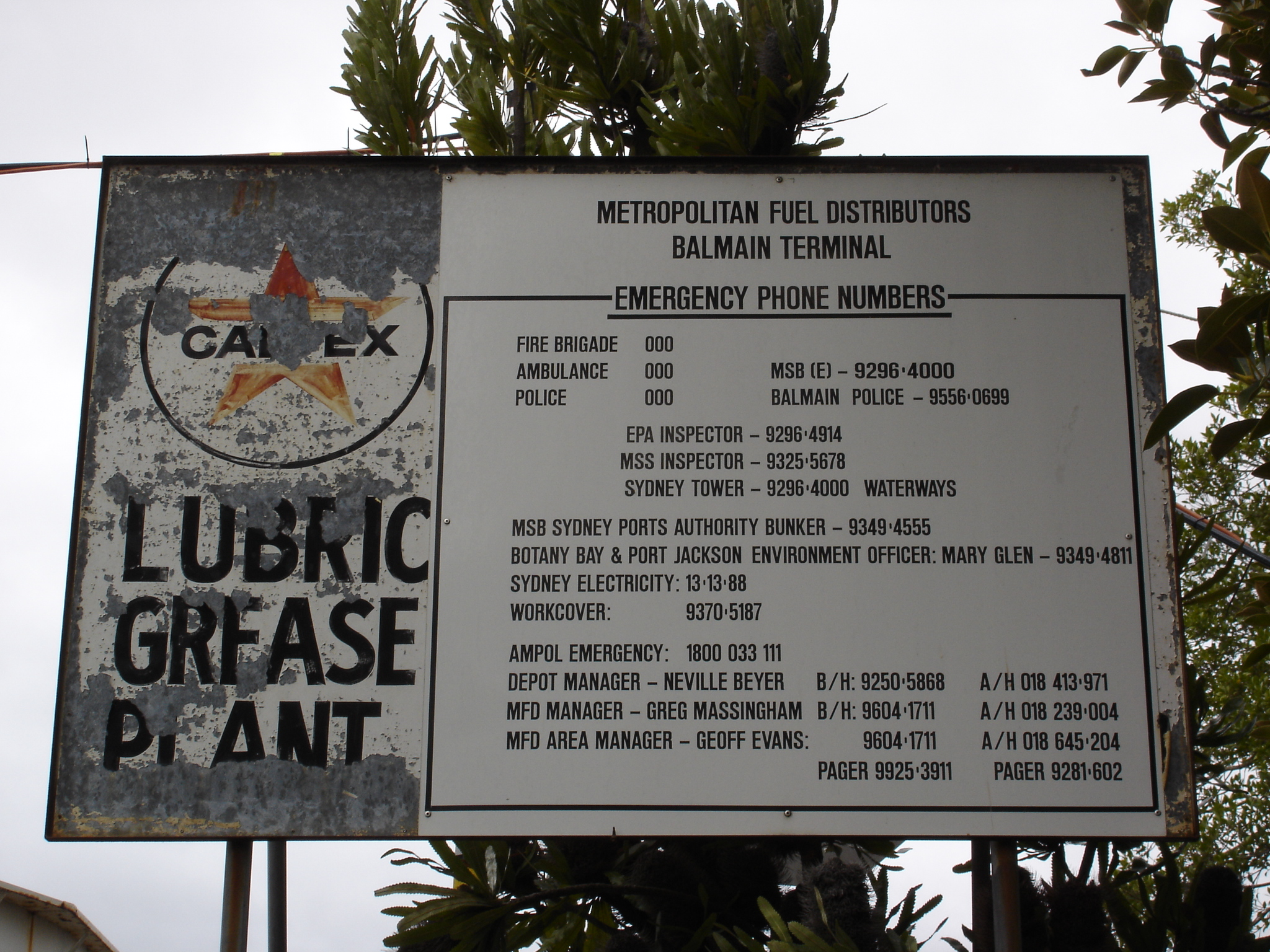
Original Ballast Point sign from the former Caltex site

Ballast Point was sold by Parbury to Cooper (NSW Controller of Customs and later Superintendent of Distilleries) and McLean in 1840 but a default in the mortgage saw the land transfer to James Tod Goodsir in February 1841 for A£700. Only seven months later, Ballast Point was sold to Andrew Blowers Smith and Henry Smith for A£500. The land was advertised for sale in 1842 but severe colonial depression forced withdrawal of the sale.

Merchant and draper Thomas Perkins, purchased the two-hectare (five-acre) site for A£300 in 1852 and in 1864 built the only house thought to have existed on the site, Menevia. From this point until 1875 the site was known as Menevia Point after the residence and from 1884 to 1928 was known as Perkins Point after Mrs Perkins who lived in the house. In 1905 the land passed to Henry Thomas Perkins, a barrister living in Surrey, England, who never took up residence at the site. From 1893 to at least 1915 Menevia was used as a boarding house and possibly still operated as such in the early 1920s. By 1928, Menevia had fallen into disrepair and the site was purchased by Texaco (later Caltex) who demolished the house to make way for a fuel depot, manufacturing and packaging facility. Ballast Point formed Texaco's major distribution point in Sydney and continued until the 1990s.

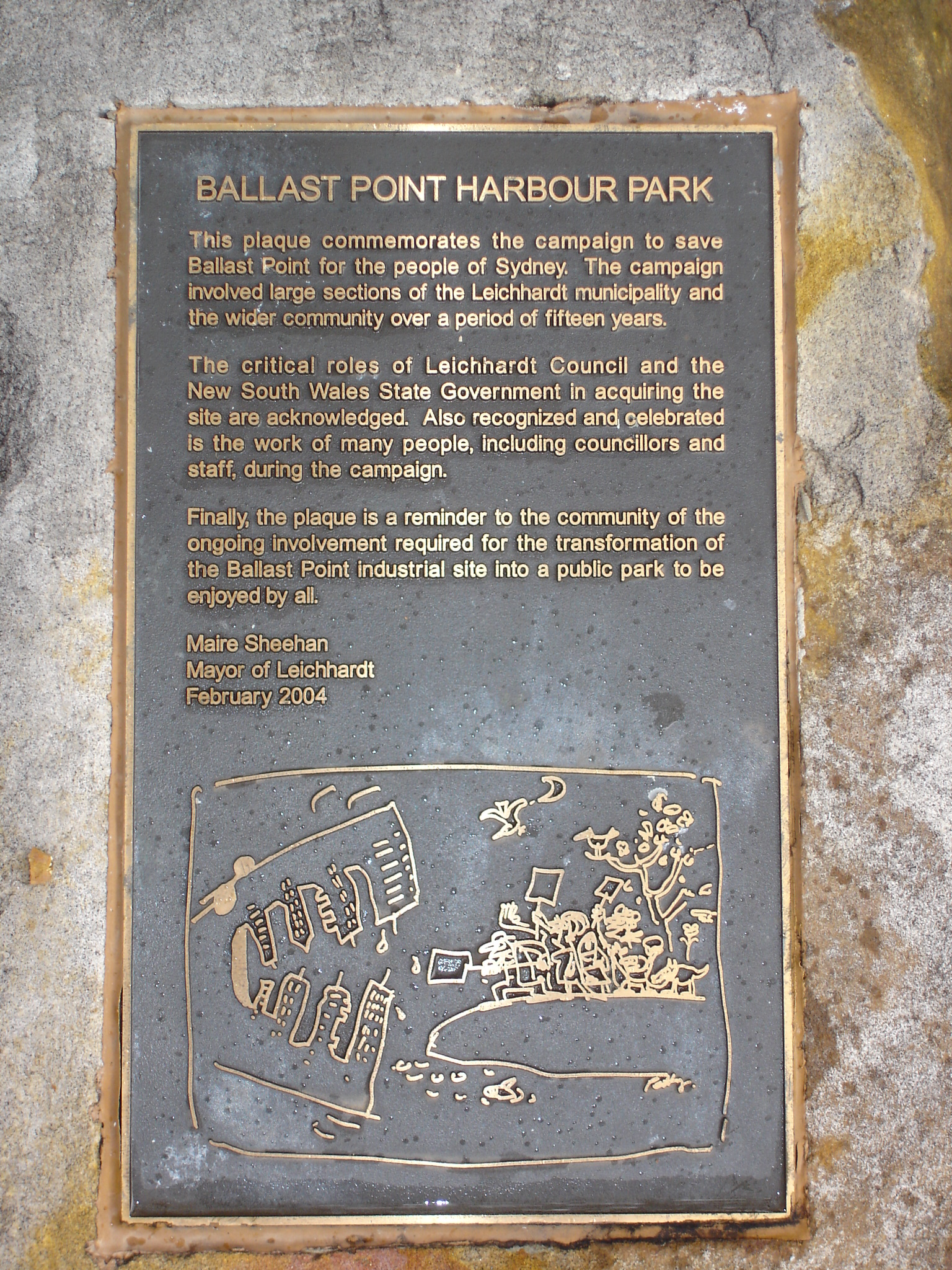
Plaque commemorating the campaign to save Ballast Point

In September 2002, the derelict site was returned to public ownership after compulsory purchase for A$24 million by the NSW Government. Caltex had planned to sell the site to the Walker Corporation for development of residential units. A legal dispute ensued over the amount paid for the purchase but an initial win by the developers was overturned by the NSW Court of Appeal. Significant community support for public ownership had occurred with the activist group "Save Ballast Point", which was formed in 1984, claiming to have in excess of 500 members.

== Current use ==
Ballast Point Park is now owned by the Placemaking NSW and has been redeveloped into a public recreation space. The park was designed by the McGregor Coxall Landscape Architecture and Urban Design studio from Sydney. Ballast Point Park opened to the public on 11 July 2009. The opening was attended by local state member Verity Firth and NSW Premier Nathan Rees. The A$16 million project included demolition and decontamination of the derelict industrial site with construction of steel stairways, recycled building rubble walls, artworks, shade structures, wind turbines and Australian native gardens.

== See also ==
- Thomas Sutcliffe Mort
- Dry Dock and Engineering Works
