= HMAS Encounter (naval base) =

Naval depot of the Royal Australian Navy

- Birkenhead, South Australia; Near Adelaide, in Australia

Site information
- Type: Naval base
- Owner: Royal Australian Navy
- Operator: Royal Australian Navy

Location
- Location within South Australia
- Coordinates: 34°50′21″S 138°29′53″E

Site history
- In use: HMAS Cerberus IV (13 September 1939 – 1 August 1940); HMAS Torrens (1 August 1940 – 1 March 1965); HMAS Encounter (1 March 1965 – 21 March 1994); NHQ-SA (21 March 1994 – 28 May 2022)
- Fate: Commissioned

Garrison information
- Current commander: Commander Emma McDonald-Kerr
- Garrison: RAN Band South Australia Personnel Support

HMAS Encounter is a Royal Australian Navy (RAN) naval establishment in South Australia. The name was first used from 1965 to 1994 for the naval depot at Birkenhead, and was recommissioned by Chief of the Navy, Vice Admiral Michael Noonan, on 28 May 2022, initially based at Keswick Barracks.

Formerly HMAS Torrens commissioned in August 1940 before being commissioned as HMAS Encounter in 1965.

With the base closure in June 1994, a Navy Support Office South Australia, later Navy Headquarters-SA (NHQ-SA) was established in Keswick Barracks. As a result of the growing importance of South Australian shipbuilding and the growth in RAN personnel in South Australia, HMAS Encounter was recommissioned in May 2022 with initial accommodation at Keswick Barracks and to be relocated to accommodation in Osborne, South Australia at a later time.

== See also ==
- Encounter (disambiguation)
