= Finschhafen =

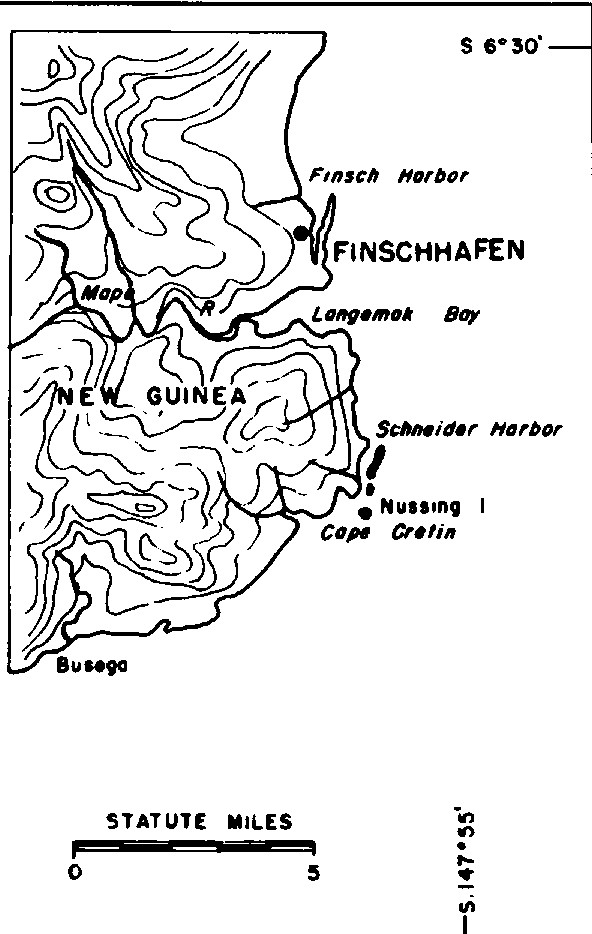
- Map of Finschhafen

- Location within Papua New Guinea
- Coordinates: 6°36′S 147°51′E
- Country: Papua New Guinea
- Province: Morobe Province
- Established: 1884
- Time zone: UTC+10 (AEST)
- Climate: Af

Finschhafen is a town 80 kilometers (50 mi) east of Lae on the Huon Peninsula in Morobe Province of Papua New Guinea. The town is commonly misspelt as Finschafen or Finschaven. During World War II, the town was also referred to as Fitch Haven in the logs of some U.S. Navy men.

== History ==
The area was charted by the British navigator Captain John Moresby in 1873–74.

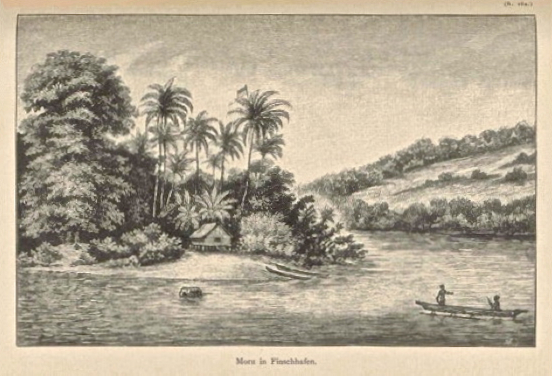
Moru in Finschhafen 1884–1885. Sketch by Otto Finsch

Finschhafen was surveyed in 1884 by the German scientist and explorer Otto Finsch who gave his name to the town. A town was built in 1885 as part of the colony of German New Guinea and was named after the discoverer (-hafen = -harbour). In 1886, Johann Flierl and two other Lutheran missionaries settled in the area, creating a Mission station at Simbang. A malaria epidemic in 1891 caused the town to be abandoned by the German plantation owners and government officials. It was resettled afterward and was claimed by the Germans in 1894. It was finally abandoned in 1901.

Finschhafen was occupied by the Imperial Japanese Army on 10 March 1942 during World War II. Australian forces recaptured the town at the Battle of Sattelberg during the Huon Peninsula campaign on 2 October 1943. The US built Naval Base Finschhafen in 1943-1944.

== Transport ==
The city is served by Finschhafen Airport, built by US military during WW2; it has no scheduled air service as of 2023.

On 2 February 2012, the passenger boat MV Rabaul Queen, which had 350 or more passengers on board, sank 9 nautical miles (17 km; 10 mi) away from the town, killing six people, injuring seven, and leaving at least 100 but possibly over 300 missing.

== Climate ==
Finschhafen has a tropical rainforest climate (Af) with heavy to very heavy rainfall year-round. Unlike many places in Papua New Guinea, Finschhafen and the southern part of Huon Peninsula experience a rainfall maximum during the south-east monsoon (low sun season) because the Huon mountains block the north-westerly winds during the high sun season. The variation in Finschhafen is more than Lae because of stronger rain-shadow from the north-west monsoon winds.

Climate data for Finschhafen
Month	Jan	Feb	Mar	Apr	May	Jun	Jul	Aug	Sep	Oct	Nov	Dec	Year
Mean daily maximum °C (°F)	30.4 (86.7)	31.2 (88.2)	30.7 (87.3)	30.4 (86.7)	29.6 (85.3)	28.7 (83.7)	28.0 (82.4)	28.6 (83.5)	29.2 (84.6)	29.3 (84.7)	30.4 (86.7)	30.3 (86.5)	29.7 (85.5)
Daily mean °C (°F)	26.5 (79.7)	27.0 (80.6)	26.8 (80.2)	26.4 (79.5)	26.0 (78.8)	25.4 (77.7)	24.9 (76.8)	25.2 (77.4)	25.7 (78.3)	25.8 (78.4)	26.4 (79.5)	26.4 (79.5)	26.0 (78.9)
Mean daily minimum °C (°F)	22.7 (72.9)	22.8 (73.0)	22.9 (73.2)	22.4 (72.3)	22.5 (72.5)	22.2 (72.0)	21.9 (71.4)	21.8 (71.2)	22.2 (72.0)	22.3 (72.1)	22.4 (72.3)	22.6 (72.7)	22.4 (72.3)
Average precipitation mm (inches)	133 (5.2)	112 (4.4)	144 (5.7)	287 (11.3)	426 (16.8)	561 (22.1)	589 (23.2)	496 (19.5)	449 (17.7)	398 (15.7)	264 (10.4)	222 (8.7)	4,081 (160.7)
Source: Climate-Data.org

== See also ==
- Finschhafen District
- Finschhafen Kotte LLG
- Battle of Finschhafen
- MV Rabaul Queen
