= Admiralty Islands campaign order of battle =

This is the order of battle of Allied and Japanese forces during the Admiralty Islands campaign of 1944.

== Allied forces ==
The Allied Task Force BREWER for the occupation of the Admiralty Islands consisted of:

=== Ground Forces ===
All US Army unless otherwise noted

- 1st Cavalry Division (less 603rd Tank Company) under Major general Innis P. Swift
  - Chief of Staff: Colonel Clarence A. Sheldon
  - 1st Cavalry Brigade under Brigadier general William C. Chase
    - 5th Cavalry Regiment under Colonel Hugh F. T. Hoffman
    - 12th Cavalry Regiment under Colonel John H. Stadler Jr.
  - 2nd Cavalry Brigade under Brigadier general Verne D. Mudge
    - 7th Cavalry Regiment under Colonel Glenn S. Finley
    - 8th Cavalry Regiment under Lieutenant colonel William J. Bradley
  - 1st Cavalry Division Artillery under Brigadier general Rex E. Chandler
    - 61st Field Artillery Battalion
    - 82nd Field Artillery Battalion
    - 99th Field Artillery Battalion
  - 8th Engineer Squadron
  - 1st Medical Squadron
  - 16th Quartermaster Squadron
  - 1st Antitank Troop
  - 1st Signal Troop
  - 27th Ordnance Medium Maintenance Company
- Alamo Scouts
- 2nd Battalion, 50th Coast Artillery Regiment
- 168th Anti-Aircraft Artillery Battalion (Gun)
- HQ and HQ Battery, 15th Anti-Aircraft Artillery Group
- Battery C, 237th Anti-Aircraft Artillery Battalion (Searchlight)
- 211th Coast Artillery Battalion (Anti-Aircraft) (Automatic Weapons)
- Shore Battalion and Company A, Boat Battalion, 592nd Engineer Boat and Shore Regiment
- 1 Platoon, 453rd Engineer Depot Company
- Detachment, 267th Ordnance Medium Maintenance Company (Anti-Aircraft)
- 287th Ordnance Medium Maintenance Company
- 27th Portable Surgical Hospital
- 30th Portable Surgical Hospital
- 603rd Medical Clearing Company
- 58th Evacuation Hospital
- 28th Malaria Survey Unit
- 52nd Malaria Control Unit
- 3526th Quartermaster Truck Company (less 2 platoons)
- 695th Quartermaster Truck Company
- 2nd Platoon, 1998th Quartermaster Truck Company
- 1 Platoon, 3818th Gas Supply Company
- Detachment, 493rd Quartermaster Depot Supply Company
- Company C, 267th Quartermaster Service Battalion (less 1 platoon)
- HQ and 2nd Platoon, 123rd Quartermaster Bakery Company
- Provisional Bakery Platoon (2nd Platoon, 352nd Quartermaster Bakery Company)
- 1 Section, 286th Quartermaster Refrigeration Company
- 294th Port Company
- 167th Port Company (less 1 Platoon and 1 Section)
- 466th Amphibious Truck Company (less 1 platoon)
- Detachment, 94th Chemical Composite Company
- Section, 1st Platoon, 604th Quartermaster Graves Registration Company
- Detachment, Company A, 60th Signal Battalion
- 611th Ordnance Ammunition Company
- 17th and 19th Radio Station Sections, 832nd Signal Service Company
- ANGAU Detachment

=== Naval Forces ===
All USN unless otherwise noted

- Naval Shore Detachment, 7th Fleet
- No. 9 Naval Advance Unit (less Advance Detachment)
- 17th Naval Construction Regiment
- No. 40 Communications Unit
- Hydrographic Survey Unit
- Advance Echelon LION 4
  - 6 Construction Battalions
  - 3 ACORNs (less CBs)
  - 1 Construction Battalion (Special)
  - No. 15 PT Overhaul and Operating Base

=== Air Forces ===
All RAAF unless otherwise noted

- No. 73 Wing
  - No. 76 Squadron (P-40 Kittyhawk)
  - No. 77 Squadron (P-40 Kittyhawk)
  - No. 79 Squadron (Supermarine Spitfire)
- No. 114 Mobile Fighter Sector HQ
- No. 152, 340, 345, 346 and 347 Radar Stations
- No. 73 Wing Signals Station
- No. 49 Operational Base Unit
- No. 12 Repair and Salvage Unit
- No 3 section, 1 Malaria Control Unit
- No. 77 Medical Clearing Station
- 12th Air Liaison Party (USAAF)
- Detachment 7, Transportation and Movements Office
- Detachment 4, Replenishing Centre
- Detachment, 16 Store Unit
- Detachment, 7 Coastal Unit
- Canteen Unit

== Japanese forces ==
The Japanese garrison of the Admiralty Islands was expanded in the months prior to the Allied landings. On 2 February 1944 it consisted of:

- 1st Battalion, 229th Infantry Regiment
- 2nd Battalion, 1st Independent Mixed Regiment
- 51st Transport Regiment
- Elements, 14th Naval Base Force
