= Chiaramonte (disambiguation) =

Chiaramonte are a noble family of Sicily.

Chiaramonte may also refer to:

== People with the surname ==
- Andrea Chiaramonte, (died 1392), eighth count of Modica
- Costanza Chiaramonte (c. 1377–1423), wife of the King Ladislaus of Naples
- Federico Chiaramonte (c. 1310s—1363), fifth count of Modica
- Frank Chiaramonte (1942–1983), Cuban-American comic book artist
- Giovanni Chiaramonte (1948–2023) photographer, art theorist, art curator and academic
- Giovanni I Chiaramonte (c. 1270s–1339), Sicilian nobleman
- Giovanni II Chiaramonte (c. 1290–1342), second count of Modica
- Giuseppe Chiaramonte (born 1976), retired American professional baseball catcher
- Isabella di Chiaramonte, also known as Isabella of Taranto (c. 1424–1465), first Queen consort of Ferdinand I of Naples
- Julio Chiaramonte (1915–1983), American Lieutenant Colonel of US Army
- Matteo Chiaramonte (1330s-1377), sixth count of Modica
- Manfredi I Chiaramonte (c. 1260s–c. 1321), first count of Modica
- Manfredi II Chiaramonte (c. 1300–1353), third count of Modica
- Manfredi III Chiaramonte (c. 1330-1391), seventh count of Modica
- Simone Chiaramonte (c. 1325—1357), fourth count of Modica

== Other ==
- Chiaramonte Gulfi, town and comune in the province of Ragusa, Sicily, southern Italy
- Palazzo Chiaramonte, historical palace in Palermo, Sicily, southern Italy
- Chiaramontan Gothic architecture, a medieval architectural style in Sicily associated with the Chiaramonte family
