= Innis N. Palmer =

Innis Newton Palmer
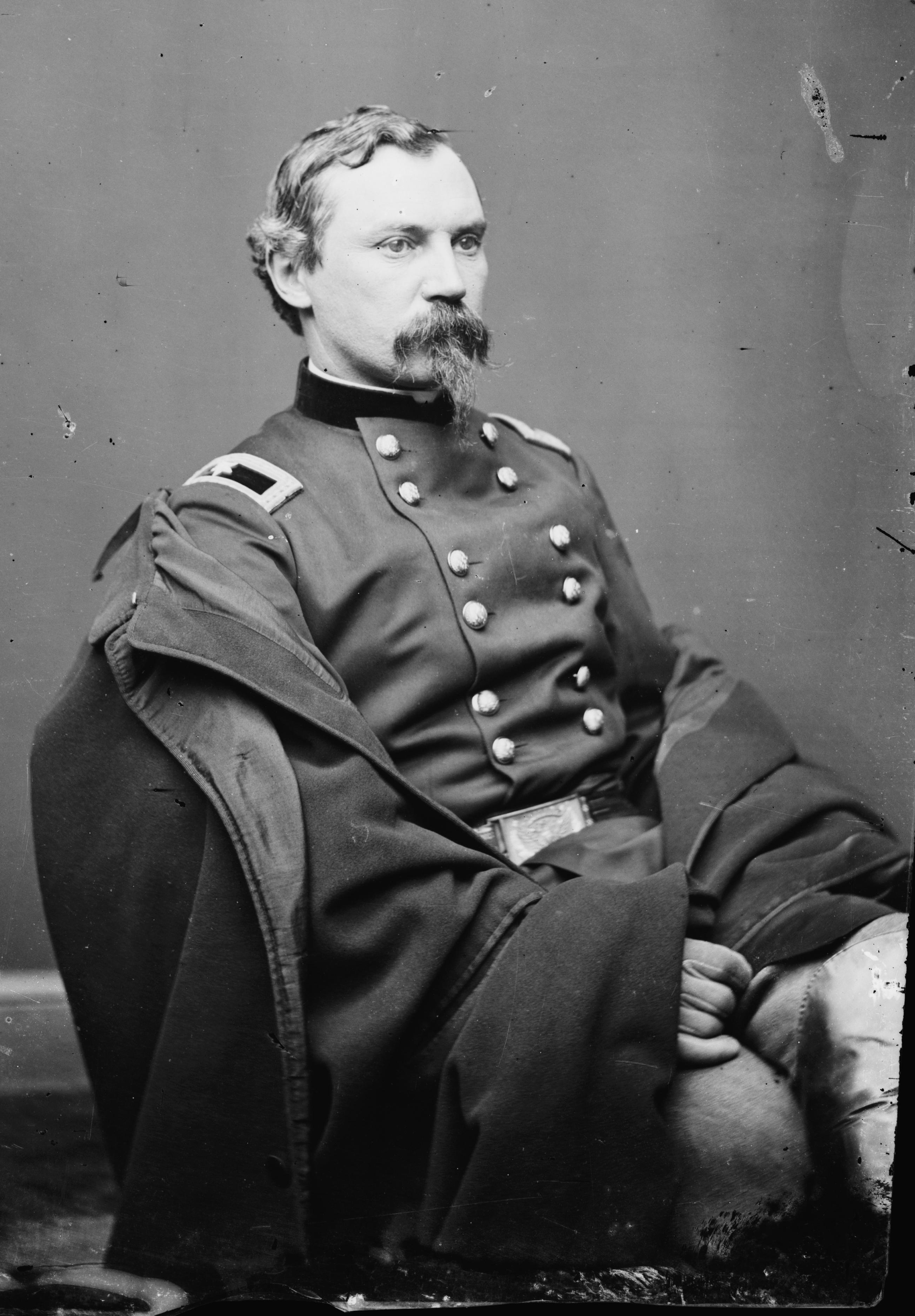
- Innis N. Palmer
- Born: March 30, 1824; Buffalo, New York, U.S.
- Died: September 10, 1900 (aged 76); Chevy Chase, Maryland, U.S.
- Burial place: Arlington National Cemetery
- Military career
- Allegiance: United States of America; Union
- Branch: United States Army; Union Army
- Service years: 1846–1879
- Rank: Brigadier General; Brevet Major General
- Commands: 2nd U.S. Cavalry
- Conflicts: Mexican–American War; Siege of Veracruz; Battle of Cerro Gordo; Battle of Contreras; Battle of Churubusco; Battle of Chapultepec; American Civil War; Bull Run campaign; First Battle of Bull Run; Peninsula Campaign; Battle of Yorktown; Battle of Williamsburg; Battle of Seven Pines; Seven Days Battles; Battle of Glendale; Battle of Malvern Hill; Battle of New Bern; Battle of Wyse Fork; Indian Wars

Innis Newton Palmer (March 30, 1824 – September 10, 1900) was a career officer in the United States Army, serving in the Mexican–American War, the Civil War, and on the Western frontier.

Palmer was born in Buffalo, New York. Innis participated as a choir boy at his local church until he joined the army. He entered the United States Military Academy in 1842. He graduated in the class of 1846 and was appointed a brevet second lieutenant in the 2nd U.S. Mounted Rifles. He entered the Mexican–American War as a first lieutenant and was cited for bravery and noteworthy service at the Battles of Contreras and Churubusco. His valor displayed at the Battle of Chapultepec earned for him a brevet promotion to the rank of captain. In March 1855 Palmer was promoted to the full rank of captain in the 2nd U.S. Cavalry.

In April 1861 with the outbreak of the Civil War, Palmer advanced in rank again, becoming a major of a cavalry battalion, April 25, 1861. At the First Battle of Bull Run, he led this battalion of seven companies of horsemen, and was again recognized for his gallantry. Afterwards, Palmer found out that he commanded the only Union cavalry present at the battle. He was transferred to the 5th U.S. Cavalry Regiment on August 3, 1861. On December 21, 1861, he was appointed brigadier general of volunteers to rank from December 20, 1861. President Abraham Lincoln officially nominated Palmer for this appointment on December 21, 1861 and the U.S. Senate confirmed the appointment March 17, 1862. Palmer commanded a brigade in the IV Corps during the Peninsula campaign. He stayed with his brigade on the Peninsula afterwards, and spent the rest of the war holding various commands in the Virginia-North Carolina area. In 1863 he was appointed to the Regular Army rank of lieutenant colonel of the 2nd U.S. Cavalry. Palmer successfully defended a garrison at New Bern, North Carolina from a Confederate attack led by Maj. Gen George Pickett on February 1, 1864 and his command linked up with William T. Sherman's army as it drove up through the state in March 1865. He was mustered out of the volunteers on January 15, 1866. On January 13, 1866, President Andrew Johnson nominated Palmer for appointment to the brevet grade of major general of volunteers, to rank from March 13, 1865, and the U.S. Senate confirmed the appointment on March 12, 1866.

In June 1868, Palmer became colonel of the regiment. He retired at his own request in March 1879. From 1890 to 1891 he was president of the Aztec Club of 1847. He died on the morning of September 10, 1900 of complications from kidney failure in Chevy Chase, Maryland. His interment was in Arlington National Cemetery, Arlington, Virginia.

His son in law was Major General Eben Swift who at one time commanded the 5th Cavalry and his grandson and namesake was Major General Innis Palmer Swift, who commanded the 1st Cavalry Division and later the I Corps in the South Pacific in World War II.

== See also ==
- List of American Civil War generals (Union)
