= Julio Chiaramonte =

- Born: 11 August 1915; Gallup, New Mexico
- Died: 10 February 1983 (aged 67); Albuquerque, New Mexico
- Burial place: Santa Fe, New Mexico
- Military career
- Allegiance: United States of America
- Branch: United States Army
- Rank: Lieutenant Colonel
- Unit: 1st Cavalry Brigade
- Conflicts: World War II; *Battle of Los Negros
- Awards: Silver Star 1944; Bronze Star 1944

Major Julio Chiaramonte (August 11, 1915 – February 10, 1983) fought in the Battle of Los Negros during World War II. On February 29, 1944, Major Chiaramonte observed the movements of two Japanese soldiers who were fifteen feet away from Brig. Gen. William C. Chase, commander of the 1st Cavalry Brigade. Chiaramonte killed the enemy soldiers with his tommy gun (Thompson Submachine Gun). On March 2 of the same year, he led a small squadron toward a hill where a Japanese sniper was firing on the compound. His squadron was successful in eliminating the sniper.

On April 1, 1944, Chiaramonte was awarded the Silver Star for his actions on Los Negros, and in October of the same year, he received a Bronze Star for his efforts in the Admiralty Islands campaign.

== Life ==
Early in his life, Chiaramonte was a boxer in Gallup, New Mexico. Chiaramonte was an alumnus of the New Mexico Military Institute and Santa Clara University where he played football and was on the boxing team.

== Citation to Accompany the Award of the Silver Star Decoration ==
General Orders No.3
Headquarters First Cavalry Division
APO 201, 1 April 1944
AWARD OF THE SILVER STAR DECORATION
By direction of the President, under the provision of the Act of Congress approved 9 July 1918 (Bulletin No. 43, WD 1918), the following named officer is cited for gallantry in action and is entitled to wear the Silver Star Decoration:

Major JULIO CHIARAMONTE 0348151, Cavalry, United States Army, for gallantry in action at Los Negros on 1 March 1944. An enemy patrol composed of officers and noncommissioned officers penetrated the defensive perimeter of the Command Post of the United States Forces, and threatened a serious raid. Major CHIARAMONTE, with cool daring, organized and led a group of his troups which, inspired by his gallant leadership, wiped out the entire patrol. Home address - Mrs Cynthia Chiaramonte, Wife, Hotel El Rancho, Gallup, New Mexico.

Signed: Innis P. Swift, Major General, U.S. Army, Commanding
