= Verne D. Mudge =

United States Army officer (1898–1957)

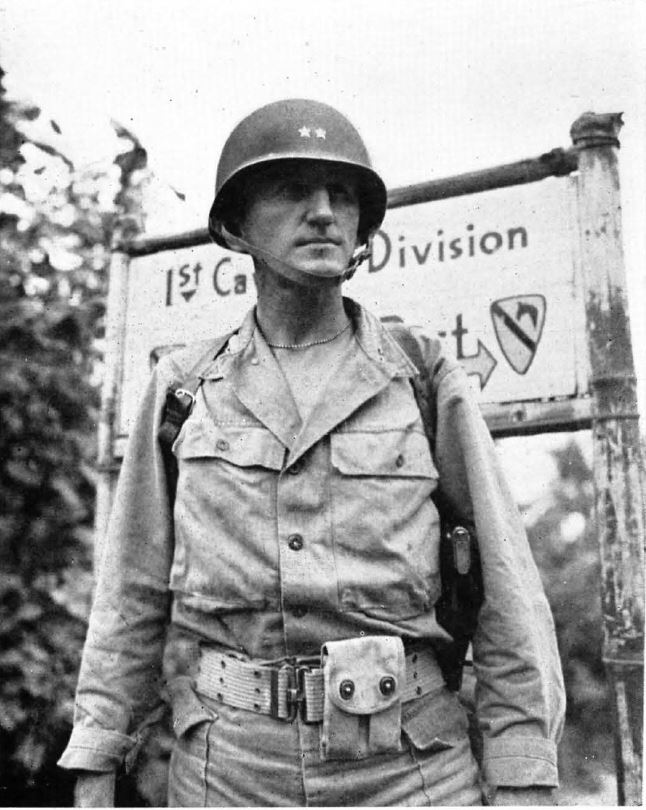
- Mudge as major general
- Born: September 5, 1898; Selby, South Dakota, US
- Died: January 29, 1957 (aged 58); San Diego, California, US
- Burial place: Fort Rosecrans National Cemetery, San Diego, California, US; 32.69362129°N 117.24500957°W
- Relatives: Walter Cowen Short (father-in-law)
- Military career
- Allegiance: United States
- Branch: United States Army
- Service years: 1920–1946
- Rank: Major General
- Service number: 0-12679
- Unit: Cavalry Branch
- Commands: 1st Cavalry Division; 2nd Cavalry Brigade; 5th Cavalry Brigade
- Conflicts: World War II; Operation Cartwheel; Admiralty Islands campaign; Philippines campaign; Battle of Leyte; Battle of Luzon; Battle of Manila (WIA)
- Awards: Distinguished Service Cross; Army Distinguished Service Medal; Silver Star; Legion of Merit; Purple Heart; Bronze Star Medal; Air Medal

Verne Donald Mudge (September 5, 1898 – January 29, 1957) was a highly decorated officer in the United States Army with the rank of major general. He is most noted as commanding general of the 1st Cavalry Division during World War II, for which he received the Distinguished Service Cross, the United States Army's second highest military decoration for soldiers who display extraordinary heroism in combat with an armed enemy force.

Mudge served his whole career in the cavalry branch, rising from platoon leader to divisional commander. His career was cut short after he was wounded by a Japanese grenade during the Battle of Manila in February 1945. He retired from the U.S. Army in November 1946 and then served as chief of the Professional Staff of the U.S. Senate Armed Services Committee until July 1956.

== Early life and career ==
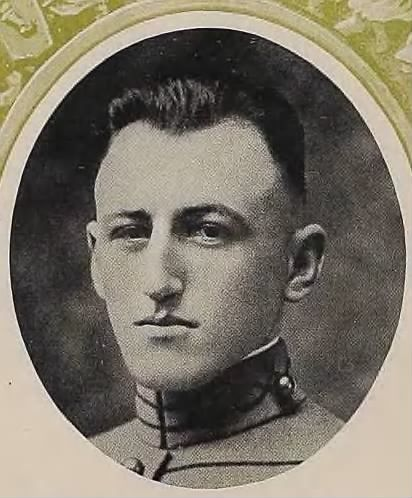
Mudge as Cadet at West Point in 1920

Verne D. Mudge was born on September 5, 1898 in Selby, South Dakota, the son of constructor and excavation contractor Richard E. Mudge and his wife Armida Jewell. His family had to move several times due to his father's job. Besides South Dakota, he grew up in Iowa, Minnesota, and Florida. They settled in Fellsmere, Florida in 1913, where his father later became a county commissioner.

Mudge graduated from St. Lucie High School in Fort Pierce, Florida. He was class secretary and editor of the school newspaper.

Upon graduation in the summer of 1916, Mudge enrolled in the University of Florida, but left two years later in order to enter the United States Military Academy at West Point, New York. There, he was nicknamed "Chief" or "Alligator", and rose to the rank of cadet-lieutenant. Among his classmates were several general officers, including future chairman of the Joint Chiefs of Staff Lyman Lemnitzer, and generals Clovis E. Byers, Sidney Hinds, Henry I. Hodes, Halley G. Maddox, and Ewart G. Plank.

Mudge graduated in shortened course on July 2, 1920, and was commissioned second lieutenant in the United States Cavalry on that date. He was subsequently ordered to the Army Cavalry School at Fort Riley, Kansas for additional training. Upon completion of the Basic course in June 1921, he spent three months as an instructor with the Reserve Officers' Training Corps Camps at Fort Ethan Allen, Vermont, and Fort Devens, Massachusetts.

In September 1921, Mudge was transferred to Fort Bliss, Texas, where he joined the Troop E, 7th Cavalry Regiment as platoon leader with additional duty as post athletic officer. He spent over two years in that capacity and during that time, he became engaged to Hortense Short, a daughter of the regimental commander, Colonel Walter Cowen Short. They married in March 1924. He then joined the 13th Cavalry Regiment at Presidio of San Francisco, California as commanding officer of Post Casual Company. Following his promotion to first lieutenant in May 1925, Mudge was transferred to Northwestern Military and Naval Academy in Lake Geneva, Wisconsin, and served as professor of Military Science and Tactics until June 1930.

Mudge subsequently returned to Fort Bliss, Texas and became an aide-de-camp to his Father-in-law Walter Cowen Short, now brigadier general, commanding the 2nd Cavalry Brigade. He served in that capacity until August 1933, when he entered the Army Command and General Staff School at Fort Leavenworth, Kansas. Mudge completed a two-year course there in June 1935, and received a promotion to captain of cavalry.

He was subsequently transferred to Fort Ringgold, Texas, where he assumed duty as commanding officer, Troop F, 12th Cavalry Regiment. In November 1936, Mudge was transferred back to Fort Bliss and rejoined the headquarters of the 2nd Cavalry Brigade as operations and logistics officer. He served consecutively under brigadier generals Robert M. Beck Jr., Innis P. Swift and Robert C. Richardson Jr. until August 1939, when he entered the Army War College in Washington, D.C.

Upon the graduation in July 1940, Mudge was promoted to major of cavalry, and assumed duty as assistant commander in Officers Branch, Personnel Division (G-1), War Department General Staff. He remained in that capacity until January 1941, when he was approached by his former superior officer, now Major General Innis P. Swift, who offered a position of chief of staff, 1st Cavalry Division at Fort Bliss, Texas. Mudge accepte,d and also assumed duty as president of the 1st Cavalry Division Board. He took part in the Louisiana Maneuvers in August and September 1941.

== World War II ==
=== Stateside duty ===
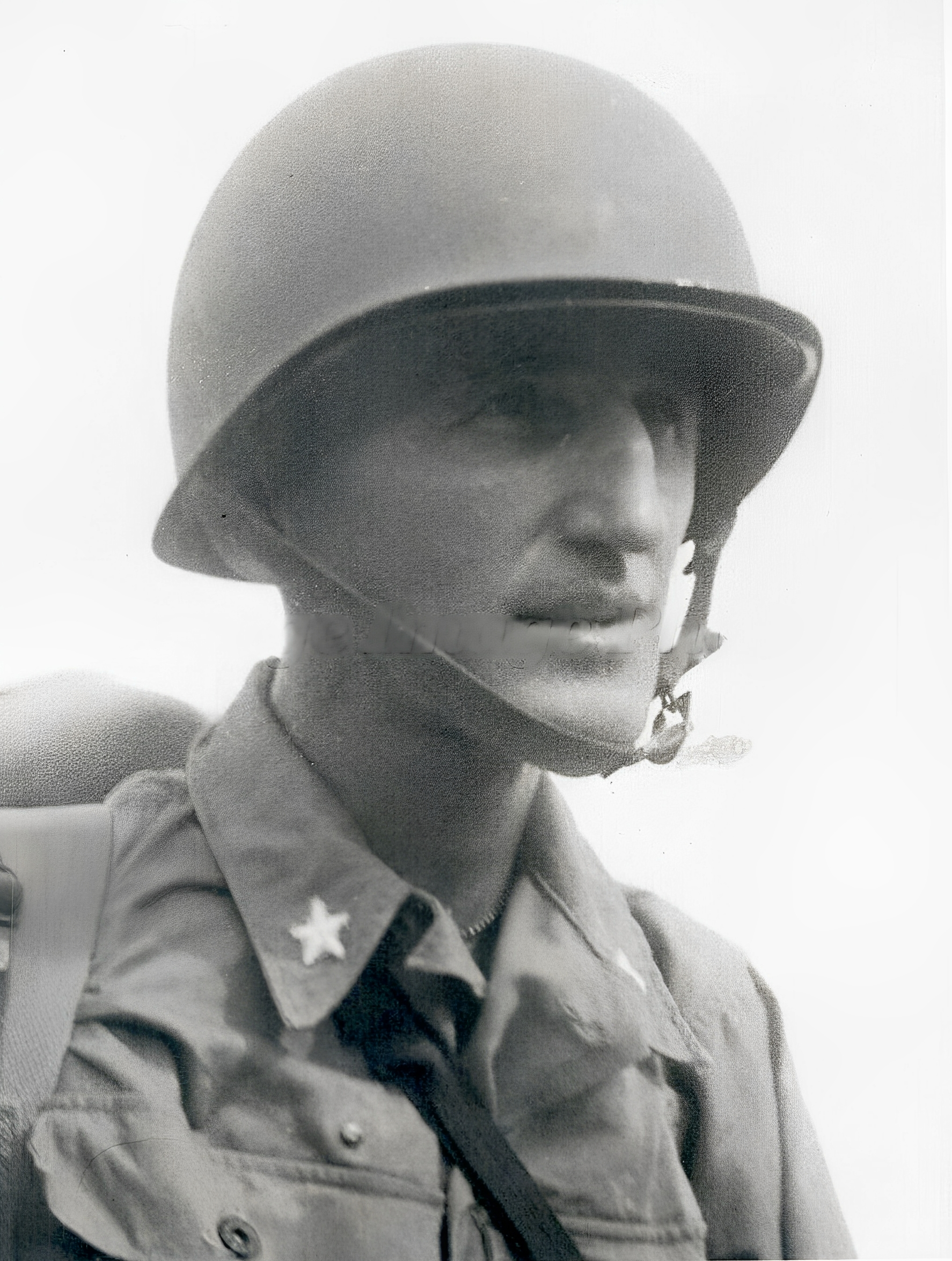
Mudge as brigadier general

Following the Japanese attack on Pearl Harbor and the United States' entry into World War II, Mudge was promoted to lieutenant colonel and participated in the transition of the division from horse cavalry to essentially an infantry division, though it retained "cavalry" in the name. Mudge was promoted to colonel by the end of March 1942. Following a period of intensive training, he was transferred to Fort Clark, Texas for duty in connection of reactivation of the 2nd Cavalry Division that December.

In March 1943, the 2nd Cavalry Division was officially reactivated by the War Department as a segregated unit created from African American personnel. Mudge was given command of the 5th Cavalry Brigade, subordinated to the 2nd Cavalry Division. However, his tenure with that outfit was short, and he returned to the 1st Cavalry Division at Fort Bliss, Texas as a newly promoted brigadier general in late March 1943.

He assumed command of the division's 2nd Cavalry Brigade. Because the whole division was already alerted for overseas assignment, Mudge participated in the preparation for movement, arriving with first units to Brisbane, Australia in July 1943. He spent the next six months with intensive jungle and amphibious training at a division site north of Brisbane called Camp Strathpine. In early 1944, the whole 1st Cavalry Division, including Mudge's 2nd Brigade, moved to Oro Bay, New Guinea, a staging area for the upcoming campaign.

=== Admiralties ===
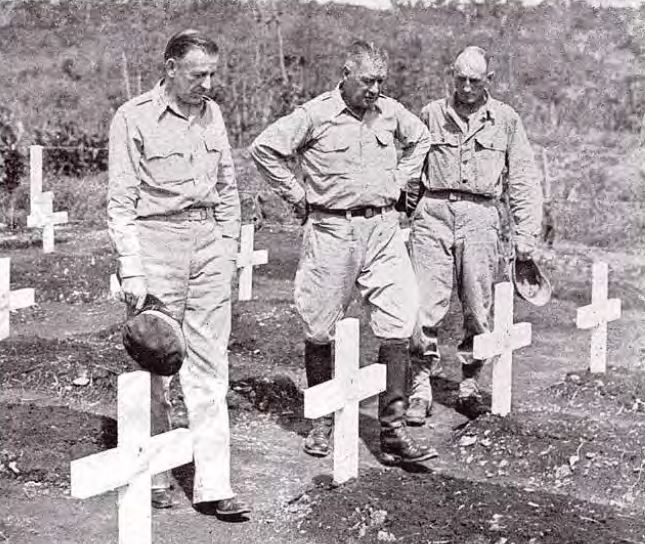
Mudge (right), Innis P. Swift (center) and Richard K. Sutherland paying tribute to fallen men on Admiralties

The 1st Cavalry Division received orders to seize the Admiralty Islands so Japanese shipping could be prevented from reinforcing the garrisons at Rabaul and Kavieng. Admiralties consisted of several islands with Los Negros and Manus Island as the larger islands. Mudge and his brigade were kept in reserve until March 9, 1944, when they landed unopposed on Salami Beach in Seeadler Harbor on Manus Island. There were an estimated 2,700 Japanese troops still located on the island, but the initial patrols found no opposition. As they were advancing inland toward the main objective, Lorengau airdrome, Mudge's unit encountered fierce Japanese resistance. During the following week of day and night fighting, 2nd Cavalry Brigade units were able to capture Lorengau and proceed to Rossum village. Rossum village and Salesia Plantation were captured by the end of March, and organized resistance on Admiralties ended.

Mudge and his 2nd Brigade then conducted mopping up operations in order to capture or kill the remaining scattered Japanese units in the jungle while the rest of the brigade were ordered for rest and rehabilitation. Around some 586 Japanese dead were counted and 47 prisoners taken on Manus Island. For his service in the Admiralties, Mudge was decorated with the Bronze Star Medal.

The 1st Cavalry Division made their base on the Admiralties and conducted training and preparation for next operations. Major General Swift was promoted to the command of I Corps, and Mudge was selected as his successor in command of the 1st Cavalry Division. He assumed command of the division on August 21, 1944, and also received promotion to the temporary rank of major general.

=== Leyte ===
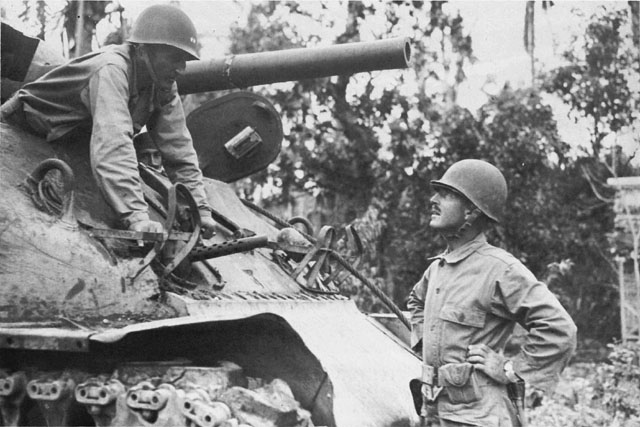
Mudge (in tank) confers with Brigadier General William C. Chase in Tacloban, Leyte.

The next operation for the 1st Cavalry Division was Leyte in the Philippines, scheduled for October 20, 1944. The operation began with heavy aerial and naval bombardment in the morning that day and lasted for several hours. First units landed around 10:00 with orders to secure Tacloban Airfield and Cataisan Peninsula. Mudge went ashore at 14:00 and assumed command of his 1st Cavalry Division, establishing the Division Command Post at San Ricardo. The Tacloban Airfield was captured at 16:00, and following day units of Mudge's division began the attack on city of Tacloban, the provincial capital, which was captured a few hours later. Mudge personally toured his units during the fighting in Tacloban while enemy snipers were still firing. Meanwhile, the rest of the division captured Samar Island.

On November 9, 1944, while on the inspection trip in the west Leyte mountains in order to obtain first-hand information on the problems which were afflicting the troops of his division, Mudge accompanied a small patrol on the five-mile hike in the area deep in the remote mountain passes between Mt. Pina and Mt. Badian. When a patrol came under Japanese fire, he remained calm and directed his troops in the face of enemy fire. The frequent visits to the front lines helped Mudge to accurately determine the disposition of his troops and supply problems.

Mudge led his units during the advance along the north coast of Leyte, and secured Leyte Valley, with elements landing on and securing Samar Island. Moving down Ormoc Valley (in Leyte) and across the Ormoc plain, the division reached the west coast of Leyte on January 1, 1945. For his service in Leyte, Mudge received the Silver Star for bravery and the Legion of Merit for command of his division.

=== Luzon ===
With Leyte secured, 1st Cavalry Division was scheduled to take part in the landing on Luzon, the largest and most populous island in the Philippines. On January 27, 1945, after the 1st Cavalry had landed at San Fabian, Mudge was instructed by General of the Army Douglas MacArthur to advance on Manila, liberate Santo Tomas Internment Camp with more than 3,700 Allied nationals interned there, and capture the Legislative Building and Malacañang Palace. The leading elements of his division liberated internees from Santo Tomas Camp on February 4, and the division then advanced to Novaliches Dam, Balara Filters and Manila Water Department, which they captured two weeks later. This action prevented the Japanese from destroying these installations of what remained of Manila.

On the morning of February 28, Mudge was inspecting a battle line near Antipolo southeast of Manila while his driver was wounded by Japanese fire. He returned to the same section of the battle line with a new driver later that day, but while he was inspecting a destroyed enemy dugout which the Army Engineers had blasted, a dying Japanese soldier detonated a grenade, and shrapnel from the blast seriously wounded Mudge in the abdomen. He was replaced in command of 1st Cavalry Division by Brigadier General Hugh F. T. Hoffman, who had served under him during the Admiralty Islands campaign and had already replaced him in command of the 2nd Brigade.

For his service in the Philippines, Mudge was awarded the Distinguished Service Cross, the United States Army's second highest military decoration for soldiers who display extraordinary heroism in combat with an armed enemy force. He also received the Distinguished Service Star from the government of the Philippines and the Army Distinguished Service Medal for his overall service with the 1st Cavalry Division.

== Later career and death ==
Mudge was treated in Philippine hospitals before he was transferred to Walter Reed Hospital in Washington, D.C. in June 1945. He spent a year in Army hospitals before joining the Personnel Board of Secretary of War Robert P. Patterson in mid-February 1946. He retired from the Army on November 30, 1946, due to his injuries sustained in the Philippines.

Following his retirement from the Army, Mudge accepted a job as a chief of the professional staff of the U.S. Senate Armed Services Committee, and held this position until his second retirement in July 1956. He was consulted mostly on matters related to the selective service and military training. His work for the committee was praised by many government officials, including Senator Richard B. Russell, who said, "Mudge had the ability to view legislation affecting servicemen from the civilian as well as the military viewpoint".

Beside his work in the Armed Services Committee, Mudge was also active in the First Cavalry Division Association, of which he was elected president in November 1948, succeeding Major General William C. Chase.

Mudge died on January 29, 1957, aged 58, at his home in San Diego, California. His body was discovered by his wife Hortense in the bathtub. They had no children. Mudge was buried with full military honors at Fort Rosecrans National Cemetery in San Diego, Section I, Row 0, Site 234-A .

== Decorations ==
Here is the ribbon bar of Major General Verne D. Mudge:

| 1st Row | Distinguished Service Cross | | Army Distinguished Service Medal |
| 2nd Row | Silver Star | Legion of Merit | Bronze Star Medal |
| 3rd Row | Air Medal | Purple Heart | World War I Victory Medal |
| 4th Row | American Defense Service Medal | American Campaign Medal | Asiatic-Pacific Campaign Medal w/ four campaign stars and Arrowhead device |
| 5th Row | World War II Victory Medal | Distinguished Service Star (Philippines) | Philippine Liberation Medal with two stars |
Philippine Republic Presidential Unit Citation
