= Eben Swift =

United States Army general

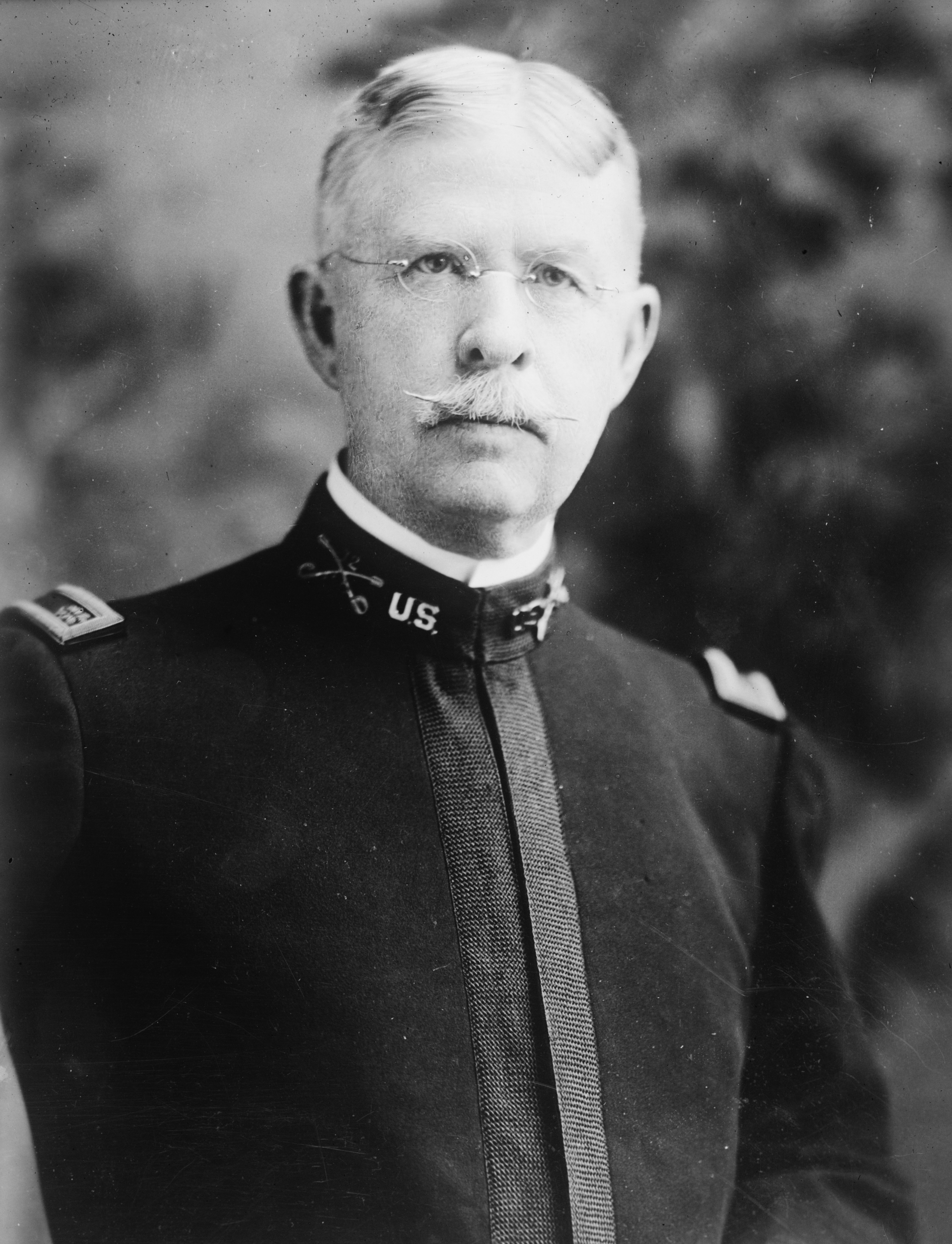
- Eben Swift, pictured here in 1916.
- Born: May 11, 1854; Fort Chadbourne, Texas, U.S.
- Died: April 25, 1938 (aged 83); Washington, D.C., U.S.
- Burial place: Arlington National Cemetery, Virginia, U.S.
- Spouse: Susanne Palmer (m. 1880)
- Children: 5: Innis P. Swift; Clara
- Military career
- Allegiance: United States
- Branch: United States Army
- Service years: 1872–1918
- Rank: Major General
- Service number: O-8
- Commands: 14th Infantry; 5th Cavalry 2nd Cavalry; 82nd Airborne Division
- Conflicts: American Indian Wars; Spanish–American War; World War I
- Awards: Order of Saints Maurice and Lazarus

Eben Swift (May 11, 1854 – April 25, 1938) was a major general in the United States Army who served as the first commander of the then 82nd Infantry Division, now the 82nd Airborne Division.

== Military career ==
Swift was born on May 11, 1854, at Fort Chadbourne, Texas, to Captain Ebenezer Swift and his wife, Sarah.

He attended Racine College, Washington University in St. Louis, and Dickinson College. He then attended the United States Military Academy, from which he graduated in 1876.

On May 18, 1880, he married Suzanne Palmer (1857–1930), daughter of Brigadier General Innis N. Palmer, and they had five children. Their son, Innis P. Swift also became a major general. One of their daughters, Clara, was the wife of Brigadier General Evan Harris Humphrey.

== Career ==
Swift was initially assigned to the 14th Infantry, and soon transferred to the 5th Cavalry, which he joined in the field during the punitive expedition against the Sioux in July, 1876. He spent several years at posts in the western United States during the American Indian Wars, including assignments in Wyoming, Montana, Nebraska, Idaho, and Colorado. From 1887 to 1890, he was aide-de-camp to brigadier general Wesley Merritt. In his memoirs, he observed: "Civilization approached the American Indians with a Bible in one hand and a paper treaty in the other, a bludgeon in her sleeve, and a barrel of whiskey in her wagon, not to mention the blight that goeth unto the third and fourth generation."

He took part in the Spanish–American War, serving in Cuba and Puerto Rico with several volunteer units from Illinois, and advancing from temporary major to temporary colonel and commander of the 4th Illinois Volunteer Infantry by the time he returned to the regular Army in 1899.

His early 1900s assignments include director of the Army War College and military observer in Manchuria during the Russo-Japanese War. He commanded the 2nd Cavalry Division on the U.S.-Mexico border during the Pancho Villa Expedition.

At the start of World War I, he was assigned to command of Camp Gordon and promoted to brigadier general. He was the first commander of the 82nd Division, which he led from August to November 1917. Considered too old to deploy to a combat zone, he did not accompany the AEF to France.

Swift later served as head of the U.S. Military Mission and commander of U.S. forces in Italy and was promoted to major general. Swift was awarded the Order of Saints Maurice and Lazarus (Commander) for his service in Italy. He reached the statutory retirement age of 64 on May 11, 1918, but continued to serve until September.

In 1919 and 1920, he was recalled to temporary duty as a lecturer on tactics for Reserve Officer Training Corps units at several colleges and universities.

== Death and burial ==
Swift died on April 25, 1938, in Washington, D.C. He was buried with his wife Susanne at Arlington National Cemetery.

Camp Swift, Texas, a World War II United States Army training base, was named in his honor.

Military offices
Preceded by Newly activated organization	Commanding General 82nd Division; August−November 1917	Succeeded by James B. Erwin
