= Admiralty Islands campaign =

Series of WWII battles

- Part of the Pacific War
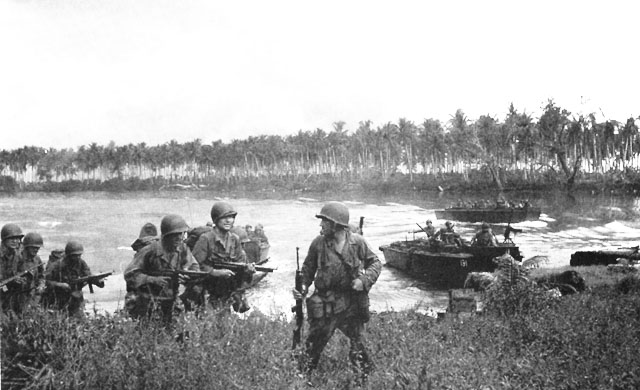
- The first wave of US troops lands on Los Negros, Admiralty Islands, 29 February 1944
Date	29 February 1944–18 May 1944; 80 days
Location	Admiralty Islands, Territory of New Guinea (Japanese-occupied) 2°2′S 147°16′E
Result	Allied victory

Belligerents
United States; Australia	Japan

Commanders and leaders
(United States) Douglas MacArthur (United States) Innis P. Swift (United States) William C. Chase (United States) Verne D. Mudge	(Empire of Japan) Hitoshi Imamura (Empire of Japan) Yoshio Ezaki †

Strength
35,000	4,000

Casualties and losses
326 killed 1,189 wounded 4 missing	3,280 killed 75 captured

The Admiralty Islands campaign (Operation Brewer) was a series of battles in the New Guinea campaign of World War II in which the United States Army's 1st Cavalry Division took the Japanese-held Admiralty Islands.

Acting on reports from airmen that there were no signs of enemy activity and the islands might have been evacuated, General Douglas MacArthur accelerated his timetable for capturing the Admiralties and ordered an immediate reconnaissance in force. The campaign began on 29 February 1944 when a force landed on Los Negros, the third-largest island in the group. By using a small, isolated beach where the Japanese had not anticipated an assault, the force achieved tactical surprise, but the islands proved to be far from unoccupied. A furious battle over the islands ensued.

In the end, air superiority and command of the sea allowed the Allies to heavily reinforce their position on Los Negros. The 1st Cavalry Division could then overrun the islands. The campaign officially ended on 18 May 1944. The Allied victory completed the isolation of the major Japanese base at Rabaul that was the ultimate objective of the Allied campaigns of 1942 and 1943. A major air and naval base was developed in the Admiralty Islands that became an important launching point for the campaigns of 1944 in the Pacific. This campaign marked the end of MacArthur's Operation Cartwheel, which was a multi-theater operation conducted to turn the powerful Japanese base of Rabaul into a de facto prisoner-of-war camp.

== Background ==
=== Geography ===
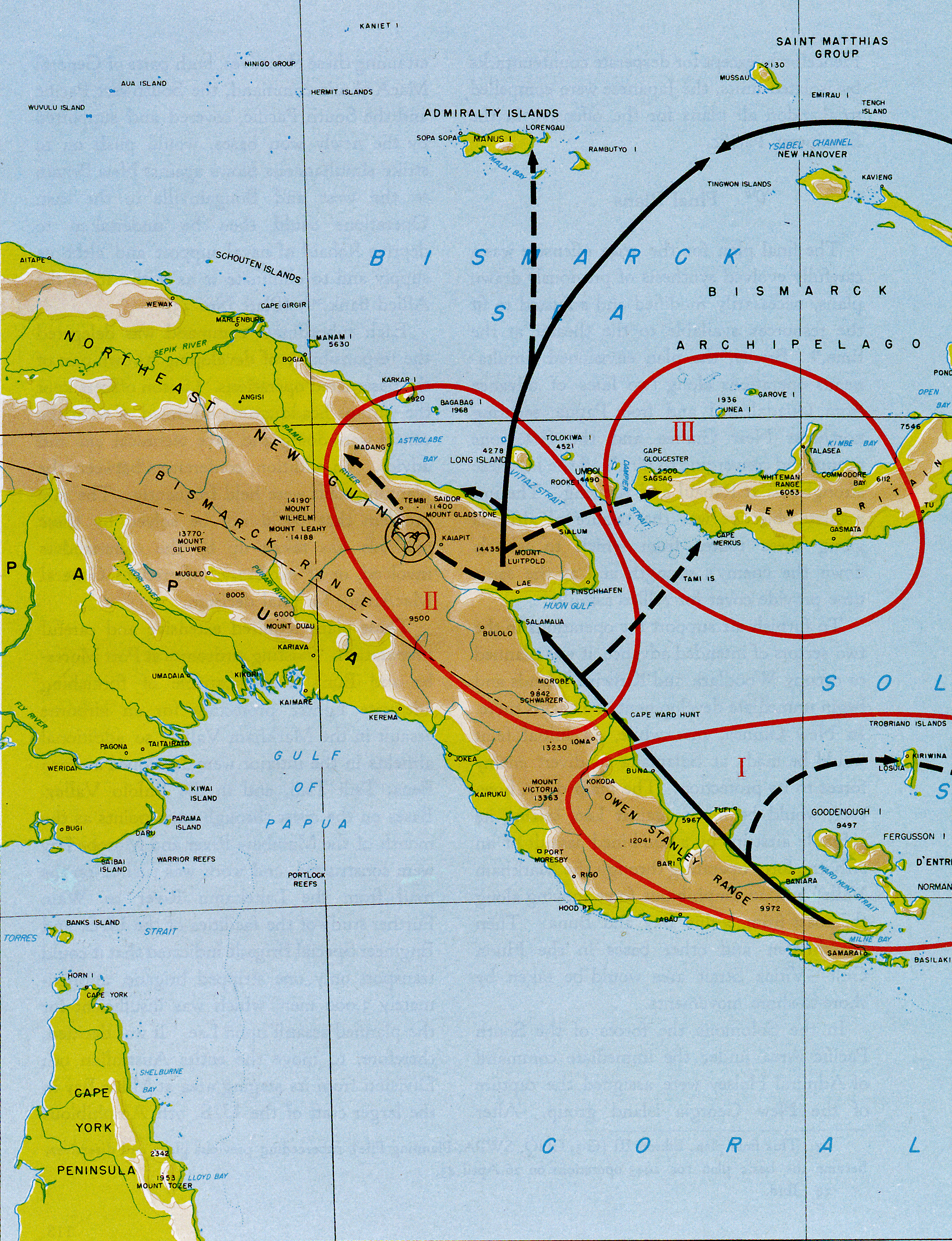
Elkton III Plan, March 1943. The Admiralty Islands are in the top-centre of the map.

The Admiralty Islands lie 200 miles (320 km) north east of the mainland of New Guinea and 360 miles (580 km) west of Rabaul, only two degrees south of the equator. The climate is tropical, with constant high temperatures and high humidity and an annual rainfall of 154 inches (3,900 mm). Thunderstorms are common. December to May is the north west monsoon season, with prevailing winds from that direction.

The largest island in the group is Manus Island, which is about 49 miles (79 km) across from east to west and 16 miles (26 km) wide from north to south. The interior is mountainous, with peaks rising to 3,000 feet (910 m) and largely covered with thick tropical rainforest. The largely uncharted coastline had numerous reefs. The shoreline consisted mostly of mangrove swamp.

The third largest island in the province, Los Negros lies to the northeast of Manus, from which it is separated by the narrow Loniu Passage. The island contains two important harbours of its own, Papitalai on the west coast, which connects with Seeadler Harbour, and Hyane on the east coast. The two are separated by a 50-yard (46 m) wide sandy spit. Here, the natives built a skidway over which they could drag canoes between the two harbours. Los Negros curves horseshoe-like, forming a natural breakwater for Seeadler Harbour, the remainder of which is enclosed by Manus and a series of smaller islands. The main entrance was through a 1.5-mile (2.4 km) wide passage between Hauwei and Ndrilo Islands. Seeadler Harbour is about 20 miles (32 km) across from east to west and 6 miles (9.7 km) wide from north to south, and up to 120 feet (37 m) deep.

=== Allied plans ===
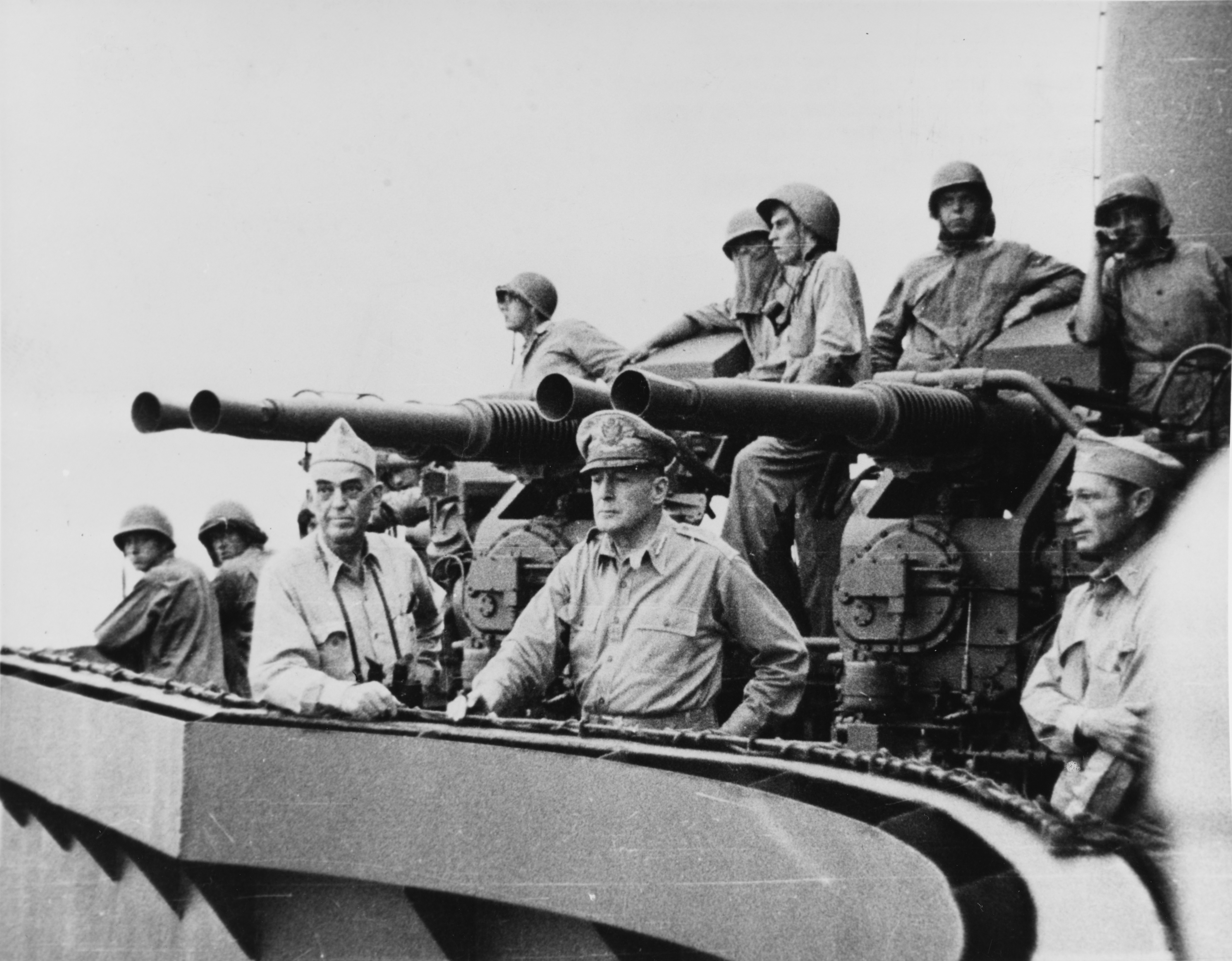
Vice Admiral Thomas C. Kinkaid (left centre) with General Douglas MacArthur (centre) on the flag bridge of USS Phoenix during the pre-invasion bombardment of Los Negros Island.

In July 1942, the Joint Chiefs of Staff approved a series of operations against the Japanese bastion at Rabaul, which blocked any Allied advance along the northern coast of New Guinea towards the Philippines or northward towards the main Japanese naval base at Truk. In keeping with the overall Allied grand strategy of Europe first, the immediate aim of these operations was not the defeat of Japan but merely the reduction of the threat posed by Japanese aircraft and warships based at Rabaul to air and sea communications between the United States and Australia. By agreement among the Allied nations, in March 1942 the Pacific theatre was divided into the South West Pacific Area, under General Douglas MacArthur, and the Pacific Ocean Areas, under Admiral Chester W. Nimitz. Rabaul fell within MacArthur's area but the initial operations in the southern Solomon Islands came under Nimitz. The Japanese reaction was more violent than anticipated and some months passed before the Guadalcanal Campaign was brought to a successful conclusion. Meanwhile, General MacArthur's forces—primarily Australian—fought off a series of Japanese offensives in Papua in the Kokoda Track Campaign, Battle of Milne Bay, Battle of Buna-Gona, and the Battle of Wau.

At the Pacific Military Conference in March 1943, the Joint Chiefs of Staff approved the latest version of General MacArthur's Elkton plan for an advance on Rabaul. Owing to a shortage of resources, particularly heavy bomber aircraft, the final stage of the plan, the capture of Rabaul itself, was postponed until 1944. By July 1943, the Joint Chiefs were considering the possibility of neutralising and bypassing Rabaul, but the navy would still need a forward fleet base. The Admiralty Islands, already a part of the Elkton plan, could serve this purpose, as they contained flat areas for airstrips, space for military installations, and Seeadler Harbour, which was large enough to accommodate a naval task force. On 6 August 1943, the Joint Chiefs of Staff adopted a plan that called for the neutralisation rather than the capture of Rabaul, and scheduled the invasion of the Admiralty Islands for 1 June 1944.

Task Force Brewer Assault Echelon Units
Brigadier General William C. Chase

- 2nd Squadron, 5th Cavalry Regiment
- Battery B, 99th Field Artillery Battalion
- 673rd Anti-Aircraft Machine Gun Battery (Airborne)
- Reconnaissance Platoon, HQ Troop, 1st Cavalry Brigade
- Communications Platoon, HQ Troop, 1st Cavalry Brigade
- 1st Platoon, Troop B (Clearing), 1st Medical Squadron
- 30th Portable Surgical Hospital
- ANGAU Detachment
- Air Force Detachment
- Naval Gunfire Support Party
- Air Liaison Party

Throughout January 1944, AirSols aircraft based in the Solomon Islands and Royal Australian Air Force (RAAF) aircraft based on Kiriwina kept up a sustained air offensive against Rabaul. Under steady and relentless pressure, the Japanese air defence began to weaken, allowing a landing to be made on 15 February by New Zealand troops on the Green Islands, which lie little more than 100 miles (160 km) from Rabaul. On 16 and 17 February, the US Pacific Fleet's Task Force 58 attacked the main Japanese base at Truk. Most Japanese aircraft were recalled to defend Truk and 19 February saw the last significant interception of Allied aircraft over Rabaul. Meanwhile, on 13 February General MacArthur, who received an intelligence windfall from the capture of Japanese Army code books by his Australian soldiers at Sio, had issued orders for the invasion of the Admiralty Islands, codenamed Operation Brewer, which was now scheduled for 1 April. Forces assigned included the 1st Cavalry Division; No. 73 Wing RAAF, providing close air support; the 592nd Engineer Boat and Shore Regiment (EBSR); the US Marines' 1st Amphibious Tractor Battalion; and US Naval Construction Battalions ("Seabees") to build the naval base—a total of 45,000 personnel. However, on 23 February 1944 three Fifth Air Force B-25 Mitchell bombers flew low over Los Negros. The airmen reported that there were no signs of enemy activity and the islands had been evacuated. Lieutenant General George Kenney, the commander of Allied Air Forces in the South West Pacific Area, went to MacArthur and proposed that the unoccupied islands be quickly taken by a small force. According to Kenney: "The General listened for a while, paced back and forth as I kept talking, nodded occasionally, then suddenly stopped and said: That will put the cork in the bottle."

Orders went out on 24 February 1944 for a reinforced squadron of the 1st Cavalry Division to carry out a reconnaissance in force in just five days time. If the Admiralty Islands were indeed evacuated, they would be occupied and a base developed. If the enemy was unexpectedly strong, then the force could be withdrawn. General MacArthur and Vice Admiral Thomas C. Kinkaid, the commander of Allied Naval Forces in the South West Pacific Area, would be on hand to make the decision but otherwise they delegated command to Rear Admiral William Fechteler, the commander of Amphibious Group 8 of Rear Admiral Daniel E. Barbey's VII Amphibious Force. To accommodate them, the light cruiser USS Phoenix was ordered to sea. At the time, she was in Brisbane, with over 300 of her crew on shore leave. Trucks with bull horns broadcast the code word recalling the crew. To achieve surprise, and to reach the Admiralty Islands in just five days, high speed transports (APDs) were required; Landing Ships, Tank (LSTs) were too slow to make the required distance in the time. Only three APDs were available: USS Brooks, Humphreys and Sands. Each could accommodate 170 men. The remaining troops were carried on nine destroyers: USS Bush, Drayton, Flusser, Mahan, Reid, Smith, Stevenson, Stockton and Welles. Between them, the destroyers and APDs carried 1,026 troops.

Task Force Brewer Supporting Echelon Units
Colonel Hugh F. T. Hoffman

- 5th Cavalry Regiment (less 2nd Squadron)
- 99th Field Artillery Battalion (less Battery B)
- 1st Platoon, Troop A, 8th Engineer Squadron
- 1st Collecting Troop, 1st Medical Squadron
- Signal Detachment, 1st Signal Troop
- 40th Naval Construction Battalion
- Battery C, 168th Anti-Aircraft Artillery Battalion (Gun)
- Battery A, 211th Coast Artillery Battalion (Anti-Aircraft) (Automatic Weapons)
- Company E, Shore Battalion, 592nd Engineer Boat and Shore Regiment

This force was commanded by Brigadier General William C. Chase, commander of the 1st Brigade, 1st Cavalry Division. It included the three rifle troops and the heavy weapons troop of the 2nd Squadron, 5th Cavalry; a platoon from Battery B, 99th Field Artillery Battalion with two 75 mm pack howitzers; the 673rd Anti-Aircraft Machine Gun Battery (Airborne); and 29 Australians of the Australian New Guinea Administrative Unit (ANGAU), who were to assist in gathering intelligence and dealing with the native population, some 13,000 of whom lived in the islands. Once the decision to remain was known, a follow-up force with the rest of the 5th Cavalry and 99th Field Artillery Battalion, 40th Naval Construction Battalion, and 2,500 measurement tons of stores would depart from Finschhafen in six Landing Ships, Tank (LSTs), each towing an LCM of Company E, 592nd EBSR. When an aide expressed concern over assigning such a hazardous mission to a unit without combat experience, General MacArthur recalled how the 5th Cavalry had fought alongside his father's troops in the campaign against Geronimo. "They'd fight then," he said, "and they'll fight now."

Major General Charles A. Willoughby's G-2 (intelligence) section did not agree with the airmen's assessment the islands were unoccupied. Drawing on Ultra and Allied Intelligence Bureau reports from interrogating local civilians, it reported on 15 February that there were 3,000 Japanese troops in the Admiralty Islands. On 24 February, it revised the estimate to 4,000. G-2 attributed the lack of anti-aircraft fire to the Japanese logistical situation, believing it was a measure to conserve ammunition. Lieutenant General Walter Krueger, the commander of US Sixth Army later recalled no one at his headquarters believed the islands unoccupied. In the original plan, a team of Alamo Scouts was to have thoroughly reconnoitred the island before the landing. Krueger had a six-man party of Alamo Scouts inserted on the southern coast of Los Negros by PBY under cover of a bombing raid on 27 February. The scouts reported the south coast was "lousy with Japs".

=== Japanese defences ===
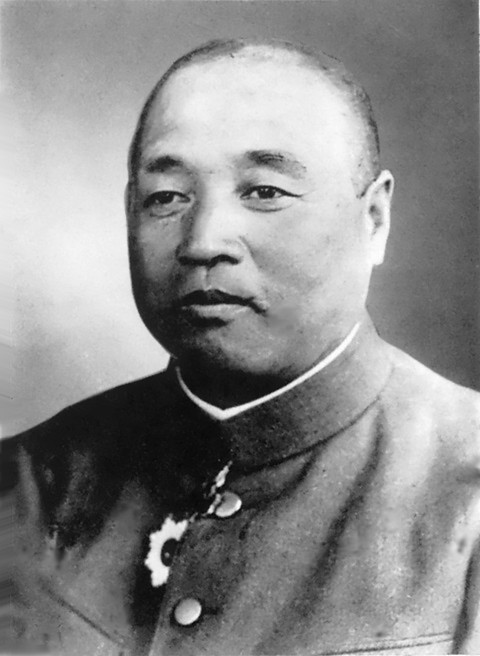
Hitoshi Imamura

The Japanese defence of the Admiralties fell under the Eighth Area Army, based at Rabaul and commanded by General Hitoshi Imamura. In September 1943, as a result of the failure to stop Allied advances in New Guinea and the Solomons, the Imperial General Headquarters (IGHQ) had decided to constrict Japan's defensive perimeter in the south and central Pacific to a new line stretching from the Banda Sea to the Caroline Islands. The IGHQ charged Imamura with holding his portion of the new line, which included the Admiralties, as long as possible to allow the Japanese navy and army time to prepare "decisive" counterattacks against Allied forces. Maintaining control of the Admiralties was crucial to the Japanese defensive plans, as possession of the islands by the Allies would place the key Japanese stronghold at Truk within range of heavy bombers. Apparently not expecting the Allies to move on the Admiralties so quickly, IGHQ gave Imamura until the middle of 1944 to complete the defensive preparations for his command. At this time the largest Japanese unit in the islands was the 51st Transport Regiment, which had arrived on Los Negros in April.

Imamura sought reinforcements for the Admiralties in late 1943 and early 1944. In October 1943 he requested an infantry division for the islands, but none was available. A subsequent proposal to transfer the 66th Regiment from the Palaus, where it was being rebuilt after suffering heavy losses, to the Admiralties was also unsuccessful as IGHQ believed that the Eighteenth Army had greater need for this unit. The Imperial Japanese Navy (IJN) also rejected Imamura's suggestion that a special naval landing force unit be dispatched to the islands. IGHQ agreed to deploy the 66th Regiment to the Admiralties in January 1944 to bolster the region's defences following the Allied landings at Arawe and Saidor in mid-December and early January respectively, but this movement was cancelled after a ship carrying reinforcements for the regiment was sunk by USS Whale with heavy loss of life on the 16th of the month. Following this disaster Imamura directed the 38th Division to dispatch a battalion to the islands, and 750 men of the 2nd Battalion, 1st Independent Mixed Regiment arrived there on the night of 24/25 January. A subsequent attempt to ship an infantry and an artillery battalion to the Admiralties was frustrated by Allied air and submarine attacks, but 530 soldiers of the 38th Division's 1st Battalion, 229th Infantry Regiment arrived there on the night of 2 February. Most of these troop movements were detected by Allied intelligence.

Yoshio Ezaki

At the time of the Allied landing, Imperial Japanese Army forces in the Admiralties consisted of the 51st Transport Regiment under Colonel Yoshio Ezaki, who was also the overall garrison commander; 2nd Battalion, 1st Independent Mixed Regiment; 1st Battalion, 229th Infantry Regiment; and elements of the IJN's 14th Naval Base Force. Allied G-2 had identified the presence of all these units in the Admiralties, though their designation was not known in all instances. While the 1st Battalion, 229th Infantry Regiment was a veteran of several campaigns, it was short of equipment and lacked its battalion artillery guns. The 2nd Battalion, 1st Independent Mixed Regiment was led by reserve officers who had seen action in China, but most of its enlisted men were recalled reservists who had not previously been in battle.

The 51st Transport Regiment had constructed an airstrip on Lorengau and commenced another, known as Momote Airstrip, at the Momote Plantation on Los Negros. Lorengau was used as a staging point for aircraft moving between Rabaul and airstrips in North East New Guinea. The importance of the Admiralty Islands to the Japanese increased as the result of Allied advances in New Guinea and New Britain which blocked off other air routes. By February, both airstrips were unserviceable and the antiaircraft guns were silent to conserve ammunition and conceal their positions. Ezaki had ordered his men to neither move nor fire in daylight.

== Battle of Los Negros ==
=== Landing ===
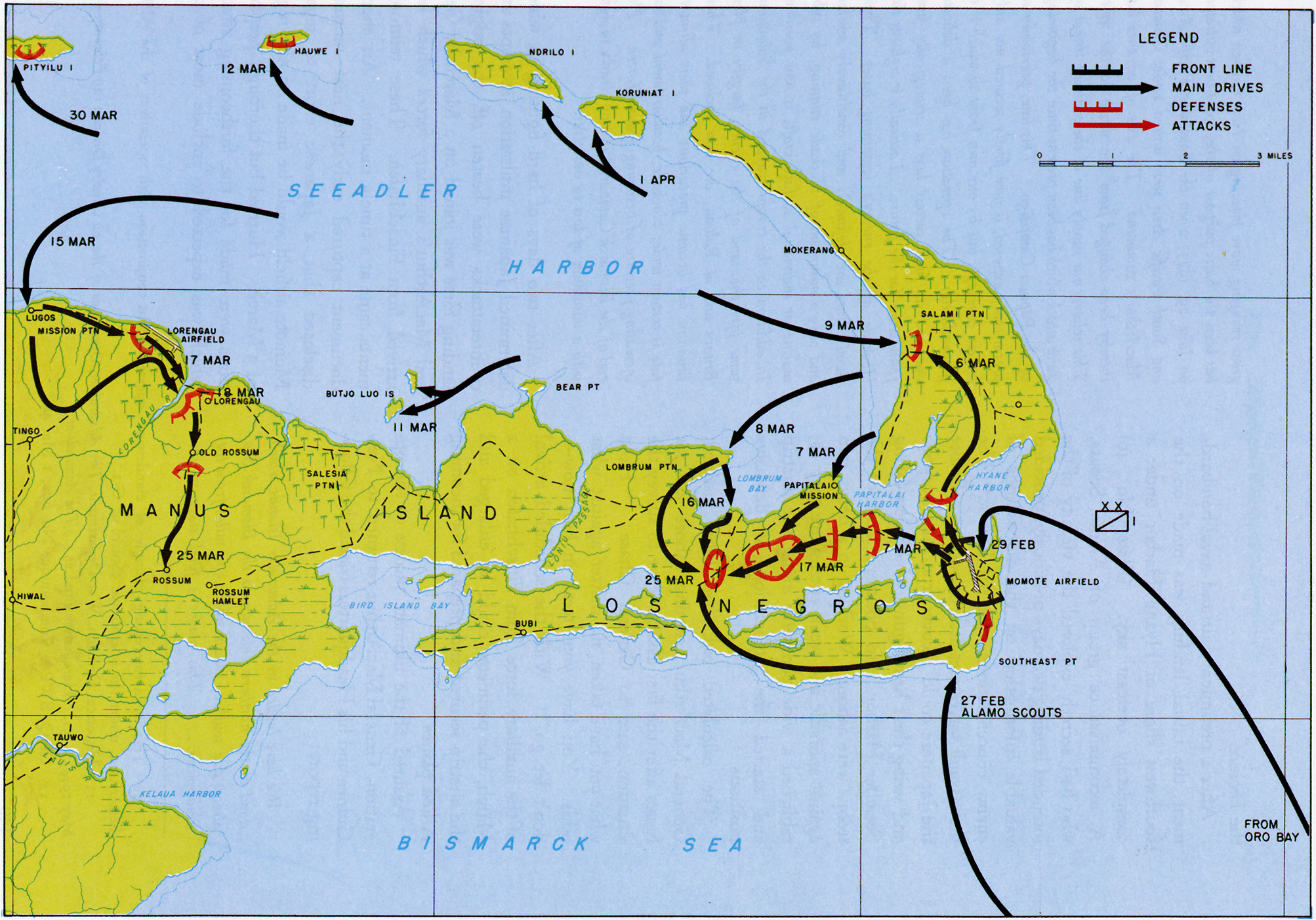
Admiralty Islands operations, 29 February – 30 May 1944

The chosen landing site was a small beach on the south shore of Hyane Harbour near the Momote airstrip. The airstrip could be seized quickly; but the surrounding area was mangrove swamp, and the harbour entrance was only about 750 yards (700 m) wide. "Since the whole operation was a gamble anyway," Samuel Eliot Morison noted, "one might as well be consistent." The gamble paid off. The Japanese had not anticipated a landing at this point and the bulk of their forces were concentrated to defend the beaches of Seeadler Harbour, on the other side of the island. The weather on 29 February 1944 was overcast with a low cloud ceiling that prevented most of the planned air strike. Only three B-24s and nine B-25s found the target. The naval bombardment was therefore extended for another 15 minutes. Each APD lowered four LCPRs (Landing Craft, Personnel, Ramped). Each LCPR carried its maximum load of 37 men, who boarded by climbing over the APDs' sides and down cargo nets. The unarmoured LCPRs were still used because davits had not been strengthened to carry the heavier, armoured LCVP (Landing Craft, Vehicle, Personnel).

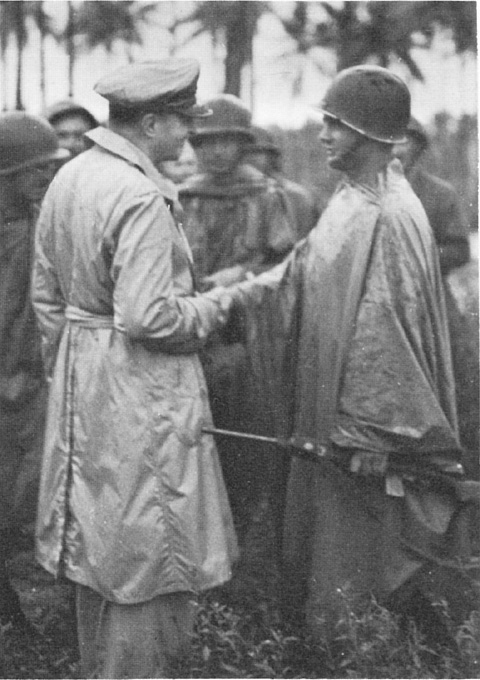
Admiralty Islands, 29 February 1944. General Douglas MacArthur decorates the first man ashore, 2nd Lieutenant Marvin J. Henshaw, with the Distinguished Service Cross

The first wave landed without casualties at 08:17, but once the bombardment lifted the Japanese emerged from their dugouts and machine guns and shore batteries began firing. The landing craft, on returning, came under crossfire from enemy machine guns on both sides of the harbour. The fire became so heavy the second wave was forced to reverse course until the enemy fire was suppressed by destroyers. The third and fourth waves also came under fire. A correspondent from Yank, the Army Weekly described the scene:

As we neared the channel, the Navy men in the bow hollered to us to keep our heads down or we'd get them blown off. We crouched lower, swearing, and waited. It came with a crack; machine-gun fire over our heads. Our light landing craft shuddered as the Navy gunners hammered back and answered with the .30 calibers mounted on both sides of the barge. As we made the turn for the beach, something solid plugged into us. "They got one of our guns or something," one GI said. There was a splinter the size of a half-dollar on the pack of the man in front of me. Up front a hole gaped in the middle of the landing ramp and there were no men where there had been four. Our barge headed back toward the destroyer that had carried us to the Admiralties. White splashes of water were plunging through the six-inch gap in the wooden gate. William Siebieda, S 1/c, of Wheeling, West Virginia, ducked from his position at the starboard gun and slammed his hip against the hole to plug it. He was firing a tommy gun at the shore as fast as wounded soldiers could pass him loaded clips. The water sloshed around him, running down his legs and washing the blood of the wounded into a pink frappe.

Four of the twelve LCPRs had been damaged. Three were soon repaired, but they could not be risked further, for without them, the reconnaissance force could not be evacuated. The emergency plan provided for an APD to enter the harbour and take troops off from a jetty but this would clearly be a desperate measure indeed. Over the next four hours, the boats continued to make trips to the beach, but only when it was believed destroyers had suppressed enemy fire. Heavy rain made it safer by reducing visibility. The last destroyer was unloaded at 12:50. By this time, the navy had lost two men dead and three wounded.

For the moment it was safer ashore. The cavalrymen overran the airstrip. Sporadic opposition allowed them to set up the antiaircraft machine guns on the beach, unload supplies, and patrol inland. Two soldiers were killed and three wounded. At 16:00, General MacArthur and Admiral Kinkaid came ashore. The general inspected the position. A lieutenant warned him a Japanese sniper had been killed in the vicinity just a few minutes before. "That's the best thing to do with them," the General replied. He decided to stay, ordering Chase to hold his position until the follow-up force arrived, then returned to Phoenix. Fechteler's force departed at 17:29, the transports having unloaded and most of the bombardment force having exhausted its ammunition. Bush and Stockton remained to provide on-call naval fire support.

=== Battle for the beachhead ===
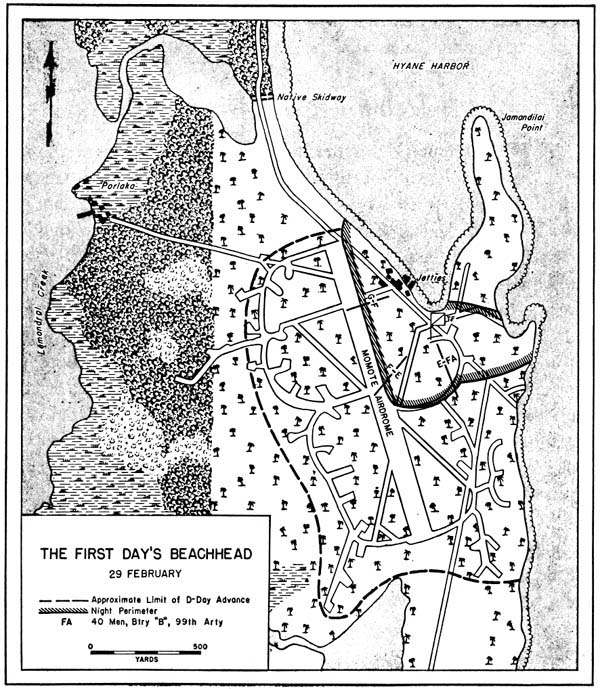
Situation on Los Negros on the night of 29 February 1944

Chase pulled his troops back into a tight perimeter. There was no barbed wire, so the whole area had to be covered. The ground was hard coral, which was good for airbase construction but made it difficult to dig foxholes. The twelve .50 calibre (12.7mm) machine guns were positioned in the front line. There was fighting throughout the night as small groups of Japanese attempted to infiltrate the position. An airdrop of ammunition was requested. A break in the weather allowed three B-25s of the 38th US Bomb Group to drop supplies at 08:30. Four B-17s of the 375th Troop Carrier Group each dropped three tons of supplies, including blood plasma, ammunition, hand grenades, and barbed wire. Some of the ammunition fell beyond the perimeter but for some reason men who moved out to retrieve it were not fired upon.

The Japanese were not expected to make another effort until dark but at around 16:00 a Japanese patrol was discovered that had somehow managed to infiltrate the perimeter in broad daylight and penetrate to within 35 yd (32 m) of Chase's command post. A sniper fired on the command post, and fire was directed at the patrol. Major Julio Chiaramonte, S-2 (intelligence officer) of the task force, set out with four men to silence the sniper. As his party closed in, there were a series of explosions. Three Japanese had committed suicide with hand grenades, while another had committed seppuku with his sword. Fifteen dead officers and sergeants were counted, including Captain Baba, the commander of the Japanese battalion which made the attack the preceding night. The Japanese launched another attack on the perimeter at 17:00 but could make little progress in the face of American firepower.

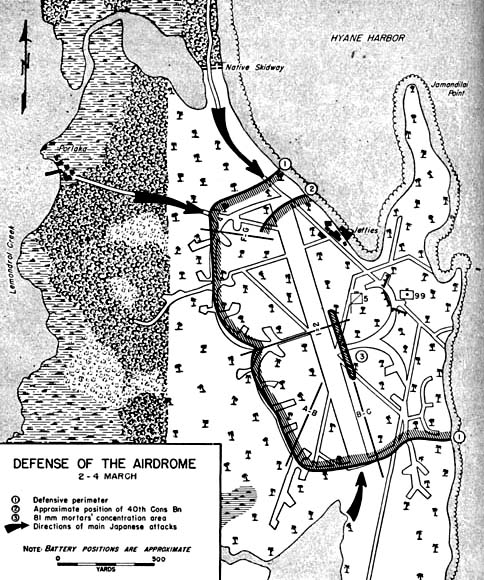
Situation on Los Negros on the night of 2 March 1944

The next morning saw the arrival of the follow-up force, six LSTs, each towing an LCM, escorted by the destroyers USS Mullany and Ammen and HMAS Warramunga and destroyer minesweepers USS Hamilton and Long. The LSTs entered Hyane Harbour and beached, coming under mortar fire as they did so. LST-202, crewed by the United States Coast Guard, replied with 3 in (76 mm) and Bofors 40 mm guns. The LSTs were unloaded over the next seven hours. In the process, ammunition, construction equipment, and stores piled up. To accommodate a proper dispersal of stores, Chase ordered an attack to expand the perimeter. An air strike was requested. B-25s of the 345th US Bomb Group were intercepted by an estimated fifteen Japanese fighters. These were driven off by eight escorting P-47 Thunderbolt fighters, which claimed eight Japanese aircraft shot down. Two B-17s of the 69th US Troop Carrier Squadron on a supply dropping run were also attacked, and claimed to have shot one of their attackers down. Two of the four B-25 squadrons dropped bombs in areas occupied by American troops, two of whom were killed and four wounded before the 12th US Air Liaison Party could correct the error. Both squadrons of the 5th Cavalry attacked at 15:00. All objectives were taken and a new, larger defensive perimeter was prepared. The 40th Naval Construction Battalion had landed expecting to work on Momote airstrip. Instead, they were ordered to use their equipment to clear fields of fire and construct fortifications, and were given a section of the perimeter to defend. Six trenches were dug out by a bulldozer and ten men stationed in each. Their ditch digger scooped out a 300-yard (270 m) trench which formed a secondary line of defence. The airstrip's revetments were transformed into heavy machine gun posts.

The two destroyer minesweepers were supposed to sweep the entrance to Seeadler Harbour between Hauwei and Ndrilo Islands but fire from at least one Japanese 4-inch (102 mm) gun on Hauwei Island prevented them from entering the harbour. Captain Emile Dechaineux, commanding the destroyers supporting the forces ashore, brought Ammen, Bush, Mullany and Warramunga around and bombarded the island. The Japanese guns ceased fire but came alive again when another attempt was made to sweep the channel. Dechaineux then called off the effort, ordering the DMSs to join him. The destroyers bombarded Japanese guns covering the entrance to Hyane Harbour to allow the LSTs to leave unmolested. One LST left with between 20 and 30 truckloads of stores still aboard. The LSTs did not wish to remain after dark as a Japanese attack was expected. Dechaineux escorted them part of the way until he received an order from Admiral Barbey for Ammen, Mullany, Warramunga, and Welles to remain off Los Negros. Ammen and Mullany bombarded Hauwei Island again in the morning, setting off a couple of ammunition dumps, but still came under accurate fire from four or five guns, and Dechaineux was forced to inform Barbey that he was unable to overcome the island's guns.

Krueger was gravely concerned about the seriousness of the situation on Los Negros. In response to urgent request from Chase, Krueger arranged with Barbey for the movement of the rest of the 1st Cavalry Division to be expedited. At Krueger's request, the 2nd Squadron, 7th Cavalry would travel in the three APDs. Other units would arrive on 6 and 9 March instead of 9 and 16 March. Krueger realised that Hyane harbour was too small to support the entire division, but there were good beaches around Salami Plantation on the western shore of Los Negros. To use them, and to permit a shore-to-shore operation against Manus from Los Negros, Seeadler Harbour would have to be opened up.

From the Japanese perspective, the battle was not going too well either. The Japanese had expected a landing on Seeadler Harbour, this being the logical American objective, and had concentrated their forces around the Lorengau airfield. The defence of the Momote airstrip and Hyane harbour was the responsibility of Baba Force, built around Captain Baba's 1st Battalion, 229th Infantry Regiment. Colonel Ezaki ordered Baba to attack the beachhead but a suspicion the Hyane Harbour landing was a diversion, coupled with false reports of enemy activity at Salami had him retain the 2nd (Iwakami) Battalion of the 1st Independent Infantry Regiment there instead of sending it to assist Baba Force. By 2 March, Ezaki had resolved to attack the Hyane beachhead with his whole force. The difficulties imposed by the terrain, and disruption by American artillery and Allied naval gunfire, forced a postponement of the attack to the night of 3 March.

At 21:00, a lone Japanese plane dropped eight bombs, cutting telephone wires. Once it had departed, yellow flares went up and a Japanese infantry attack was launched, supported by mortar fire. Offshore, Dechaineux' destroyers came under attack from four Betty bombers. 1st Squadron, 5th Cavalry, was attacked by about two reinforced platoons, which were met by heavy automatic weapons and mortar fire. The heavy jungle in this sector permitted some infiltration but the Japanese force was not strong enough to overrun the position. The main Japanese attack was delivered by 2nd Battalion, 1st Independent Mixed Regiment, from the direction of the native skidway, together with detachments from the Porlaka area, and fell on 2nd Squadron, 5th Cavalry. The troopers noticed a change in Japanese tactics. Instead of infiltrating silently, they advanced across the open, talking and in some cases singing. Their advance took them straight into anti-personnel mines and booby traps, which duly exploded, and then into the fields of fire of the Americans' automatic weapons, including several .30 water-cooled Browning machineguns, but the advance continued. The guns of the 211th Coast Artillery (AA) Battalion and 99th Field Artillery Battalion fired through the night, attempting to break up the Japanese attack from Porlaka. Shortly after midnight, Japanese barges attempted to cross Hyane harbour but were engaged by anti-aircraft guns and did not reach the American positions. A Bofors 40 mm gun position was captured by the Japanese, who in turn were driven off by the Seabees. Manning the .30s, the 5th Cavalry's gunners piled up the Japanese dead until the guns had to be moved to get clear fields of fire. One of the Browning guns that held the position was later left in its place, as a monument. Sergeant Troy McGill occupied a revetment with his squad of eight men. All were killed or wounded except McGill and another man, whom he ordered to fall back to the next revetment. McGill fired his rifle until it jammed, then clubbed the Japanese with it until he was killed. He was posthumously awarded the Medal of Honor.

By dawn, the Japanese attack had subsided. Over 750 Japanese dead were counted in and around the American positions. No prisoners were taken. American casualties were 61 dead, and 244 wounded, including nine dead and 38 wounded Seabees. The 2nd Squadron, 5th Cavalry and the 40th Naval Construction Battalion received Presidential Unit Citations. General Chase called for an airdrop of ammunition, prodigious quantities of which had been expended during the night, and had Warramunga fire on the native skidway.

=== Securing Seeadler Harbour ===
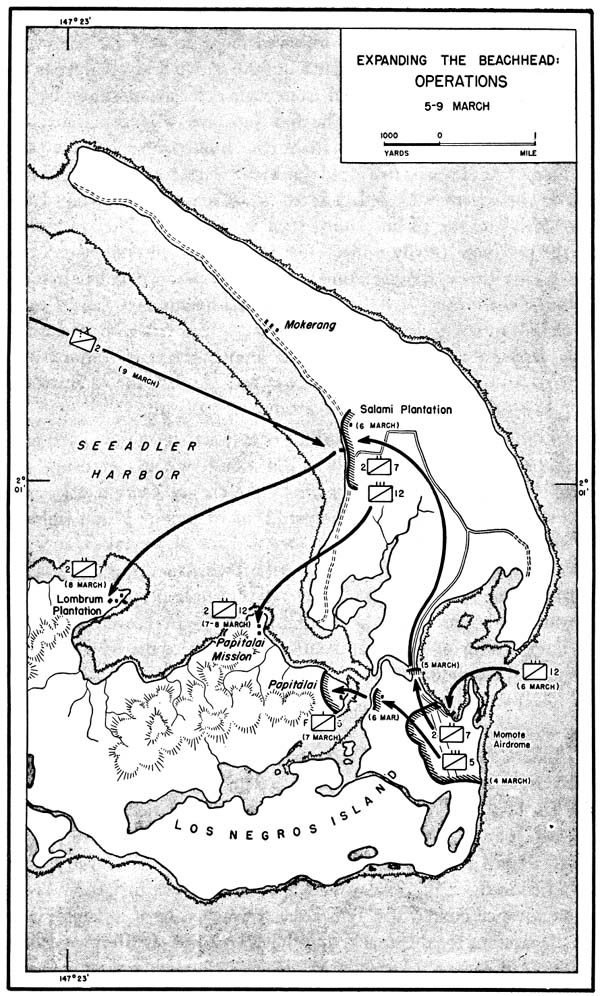
Operations on Los Negros, 5–7 March 1944

The morning of 4 March saw the arrival of the 2nd Squadron, 7th Cavalry, which relieved the 2nd Squadron, 5th Cavalry. The next day Major General Innis P. Swift, the commander of the 1st Cavalry Division, arrived aboard Bush and assumed command. He ordered the 2nd Squadron, 7th Cavalry to attack across the native skidway. The 2nd Squadron, 5th Cavalry therefore went back into the line to relieve them. While the relief was taking place, the Japanese launched a daylight attack. This was repulsed by the cavalrymen, with the help of artillery and mortar fire, but the American attack was delayed until late afternoon. It then ran into a Japanese minefield and by dawn the advance had only reached as far as the skidway.

On the morning of 6 March, another convoy arrived at Hyane Harbour: five LSTs, each towing an LCM, with the 12th Cavalry and other units and equipment including five Landing Vehicles Tracked (LVTs) of the 592nd EBSR, three M3 light tanks of the 603rd Tank Company, and twelve 105mm howitzers of the 271st Field Artillery Battalion. The 12th Cavalry was ordered to follow the 2nd Squadron, 7th Cavalry in its advance to the north, and to capture the Salami Plantation. The road to Salami was little more than a muddy track in which vehicles soon became bogged. The Japanese also obstructed the route with ditches, felled trees, snipers, and booby traps. WO2 R. J. Booker of ANGAU used his local knowledge to guide the 12th Cavalry and the three tanks to Salami. Here the Japanese put up a fierce fight that lasted over an hour. The tanks fired canister shot shells into buildings and high-explosive shells into the slits of Japanese bunkers.

The inhabitants of the area informed the ANGAU detachment the Japanese had retreated across Seeadler Harbour to Papitalai Mission. This, therefore, became the next objective. The 5th Cavalry would attack Papitalai Plantation from the east while the 2nd Squadron, 12th Cavalry would attack Papitalai Mission. The 5th Cavalry captured Porlaka without opposition and crossed Lemondrol Creek in canvas and rubber boats. A patrol under Captain William C. Cornelius fought an estimated 50 Japanese, who ultimately withdrew. Cornelius, who was credited with killing four, was severely wounded and died the next day. He was posthumously awarded the Distinguished Service Cross.

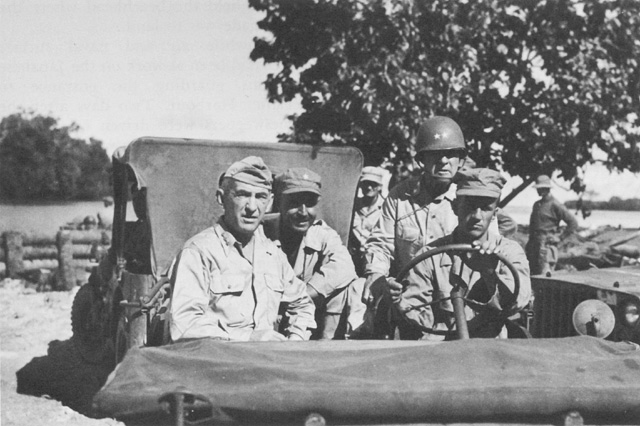
Senior American commanders on Los Negros: Lieutenant General Walter Krueger, Brigadier General William C. Chase and Major General Innis P. Swift

Because of the coral reef, conventional landing craft could not be used for the landing at Papitalai Mission. The five LVTs, one a combat type and the other four cargo-carrying, set out from Hyane Harbour to Salami Plantation but the road was so bad that only the combat and one cargo LVT were available in time. The attack went ahead anyway, preceded by an airstrike and artillery bombardment by the 271st Field Artillery Battalion. The combat LVT fired 24 M8 4.5-inch rockets. Return fire was received from Japanese mortars and machine guns, and a 75 mm howitzer. The first wave had to hold alone in the face of fire from Japanese bunkers for 45 minutes until the LVTs returned with the next wave. Later, they fought off a counterattack by about 30 Japanese. Joined by a third LVT which had eventually managed to make it to Salami, the LVTs made 16 trips across the harbour before nightfall curtailed operations, transporting part of the 2nd Squadron, 12th Cavalry, along with rations, water and ammunition, and evacuating the dead and wounded.

Colonel Ezaki reported the American attack on Papitalai Mission to the Eighth Area Army in Rabaul, promising a night counterattack on the position; but no attack was delivered. The Japanese withdrew, and no further messages were ever received from Ezaki.

The task of silencing the Japanese guns guarding Seeadler Harbour fell to Rear Admiral Victor Crutchley's Task Force 74 (TF74), consisting of the heavy cruiser HMAS Shropshire, light cruisers USS Phoenix and Nashville, and destroyers USS Bache, Beale, Daly, and Hutchins. They bombarded Hauwei Island for an hour on 4 March but on 6 March USS Nicholson was struck by a Japanese shell fired from Hauwei. With minesweepers scheduled to attempt to enter Seeadler Harbour again on 8 March, Admiral Kinkaid ordered Crutchley to try again. On the afternoon of 7 March, TF74 bombarded Hauwei, Ndrilo, Koruniat, Pityilu and northern Los Negros. Shropshire fired 64 8-inch (203 mm) and 92 4-inch (102 mm) shells, while the American cruisers and destroyers expended 1,144 5-inch (127 mm) and 6-inch (152 mm) shells. The next day, two destroyers, two minesweepers, an LCM (flak) and six LCMs carrying trucks and supplies entered the Seeadler Harbour without being fired upon. This cleared the way for the 2nd Brigade, 1st Cavalry Division to land at Salmi on 9 March.

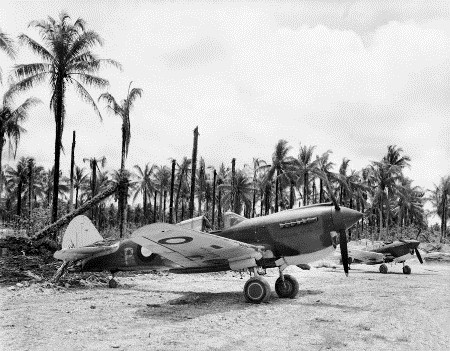
RAAF Kittyhawks on Momote Airstrip, 8 March 1944

By 7 March, the Seabees had the Momote airfield ready. Artillery spotting aircraft began operating from the strip on 6 March and a B-25 made an emergency landing the next day. Guided by a B-25, twelve P-40 Kittyhawks of No. 76 Squadron RAAF arrived from Kiriwina via Finschhafen on 9 March, the remaining twelve aircraft of the squadron following the next day. They were joined by the ground crew of No. 77 Squadron RAAF, which had arrived by LST on 6 March. The rest of No. 73 Wing RAAF arrived over the next two weeks, including the Kittyhawks of No. 77 Squadron RAAF and Supermarine Spitfires of No. 79 Squadron RAAF. Operations began on 10 March and henceforth ships and ground units in the Admiralties had air support just minutes away.

The ANGAU Detachment reached the town of Mokerang on 9 March and found fifty inhabitants. The Detachment was relieved to find islanders had not been deliberately ill-treated by the Japanese. The retreating Japanese had stripped their gardens of food, leaving the civilian population hungry, so ANGAU arranged for them to be provisioned by the Americans.

== Battle of Manus ==
=== Hauwei ===
Operations on Los Negros had now reached the mopping-up stage, but an estimated 2,700 Japanese troops remained on Manus. General Swift decided to land Brigadier General Verne D. Mudge's 2nd Brigade at Lugos Mission, west of Lorengau. Lorengau, known to be heavily fortified, was an important objective. It had an airfield, and four roads converged there. As a preliminary, the 302nd Cavalry Reconnaissance Troop was ordered to locate sites from which the artillery could cover landings on Manus. Three patrols were sent out by LCVP on 11 March. The first found Bear Point on Manus free of Japanese but lacking sites for artillery emplacements. The second scouted the Butjo Luo Islands. They found the islands apparently unoccupied, with good sites on the northern island. The third patrol, 25 officers and men of the 302nd Cavalry Reconnaissance Troop, two officers from the 99th Field Artillery Battalion, with WO2 A. L. Robinson of ANGAU and Kaihu, a native of Mokerang, as guides, set out for Hauwei in an LCVP, escorted by PT 329, one of the PT boats now operating from the tender USS Oyster Bay in Seeadler Harbour.

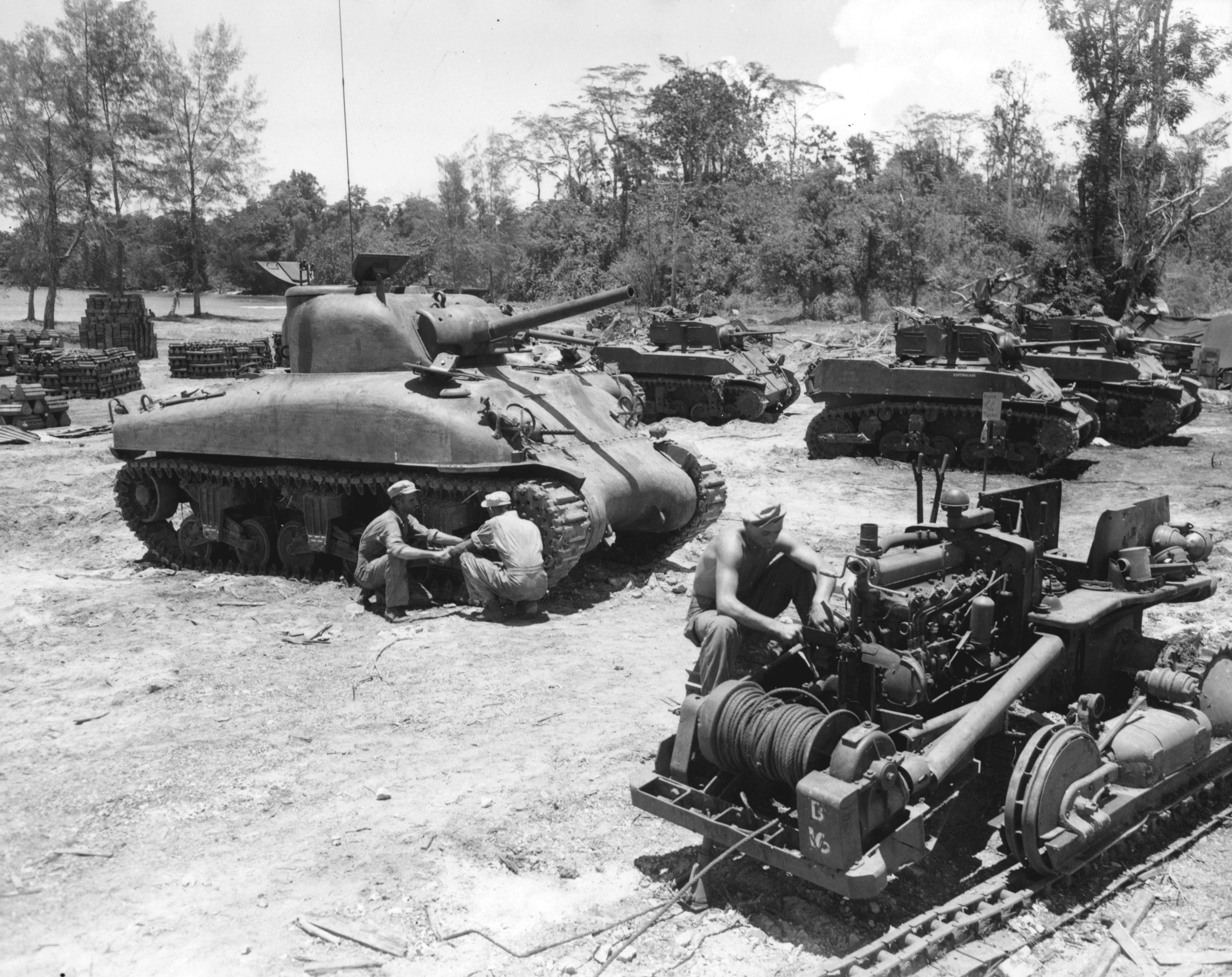
Personnel repair a tractor and medium tank off Lorengau Beach

As the patrol moved ashore, Major Carter S. Vaden spotted a well camouflaged bunker and threw two hand grenades into it. When they exploded, concealed Japanese mortars and machine guns commenced firing on the patrol and the craft offshore. The PT was hit, her commander wounded, and she withdrew. The LCVP headed toward the shore where she picked up five men, including Robinson and Kaihu. The LCVP retracted and headed out to sea but then sighted another group on the beach. She headed back in to pick them up, despite her commander being wounded, and succeeded. As she backed off the beach again, she was holed by a mortar round and began taking on water.

Meanwhile, the damaged PT had reported what had happened and a bomber was sent to investigate. Flying low, it spotted the men in the water, and another PT boat was sent to the rescue, covered by the destroyer HMAS Arunta. After three hours in the water, the LCVP's survivors were picked up by the PT boat. Eight Americans, including Vaden, had been killed and fifteen wounded, including the entire LCVP crew. Kaihu was missing and Robinson was contemplating how he would break the news to his family when Kaihu walked in, having swum back to Los Negros.

Swift postponed the landing on Lugos and ordered the 2nd Squadron, 7th Cavalry to capture Hauwei. Once again, Robinson acted as guide, notwithstanding severe sunburn from his time in the water the previous day. The landing was covered by the destroyers Arunta, Bush, Stockton and Thorn; a pair of rocket-firing LCVPs and the LCM (flak), which fired 168 4.5-inch (114 mm) rockets; the guns of the 61st Field Artillery Battalion on Los Negros; and six Kittyhawks of No. 76 Squadron dropped 500-pound (230 kg) bombs. The assault was made from three cargo-carrying LVTs. To save wear and tear, they were towed across Seeadler Harbour by LCMs and cut loose for the final run in to shore. The cavalrymen found well constructed and sited bunkers with interlocking fields of fire covering all approaches, and deadly accurate snipers. The next morning an LCM brought over a medium tank, for which the Japanese had no answer, and the cavalrymen were able to overcome the defenders at a cost of eight killed and 46 wounded; 43 dead Japanese naval personnel were counted. The 61st and 271st Field Artillery Battalions moved to Hauwei, while the 99th established itself on Butjo Luto.

=== Lorengau ===
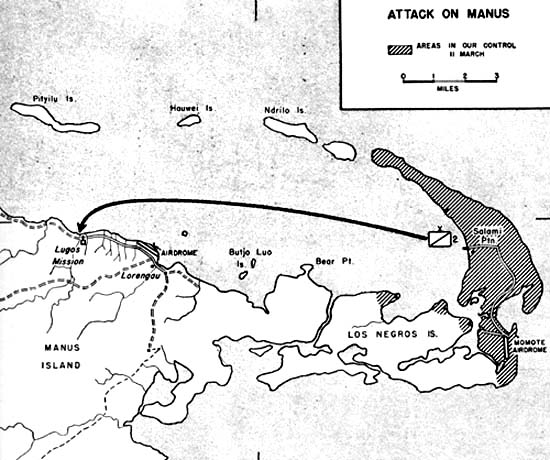
Attack on Manus

The attack on Manus got underway on 15 March. Before dawn, two troops of the 8th Cavalry, six cargo carrying LVTs and the combat LVT were loaded on board an LST for the 18 kilometres (11 mi) trip across Seeadler Harbour from Salami. Beaches at Lugos, about 4 kilometres (2.5 mi) west of Lorengau were chosen in preference to those nearer Lorengau, which were known to be heavily defended. The destroyers Gillespie, Hobby, Kalk, and Reid bombarded the area with their 5-inch guns; the two rocket LCVPs, the LCM (flak), and the combat LVT raked the shoreline with rockets; the artillery on Hauwei and Butjo Luo engaged targets; and 18 B-25s of the 499th and 500th Bombardment Squadrons dropped 81 500-pound (227 kg) bombs and strafed the area.

The Japanese had evidently not expected a landing at Lugos and their positions there were quickly overrun. The 1st Squadron, 8th Cavalry then advanced eastward until it was stopped by a Japanese bunker complex on the edge of the Lorengau airstrip. An artillery barrage was brought down, followed by an airstrike by P-40 Kittyhawks with 500 pound bombs. The cavalry resumed its advance, and occupied a ridge overlooking the airstrip without opposition. In the meantime, the 7th Cavalry had been landed at Lugos from the LST on its second trip and took over the defence of the area, freeing the 2nd Squadron, 8th Cavalry to join the attack on Lorengau. The first attempt to capture the airstrip was checked by an enemy bunker complex. A second attempt on 17 March, reinforced by the 1st Squadron, 7th Cavalry and tanks, made good progress. The advance then resumed, with Lorengau itself falling on 18 March.

Although there had been plenty of fighting, the main Japanese force on Manus had not been located. Advancing inland towards Rossum, the 7th Cavalry found it on 20 March. Six days of fighting around Rossum were required before the 7th and 8th Cavalry reduced the entrenched Japanese positions there. The Japanese bunkers, actually log and earth pillboxes, proved resistant to artillery fire.

=== Outlying islands ===
As the Japanese on Los Negros ran out of food and ammunition, the fight became increasingly unequal. A last stand by fifty Japanese in the Papitalai Hills on 24 March marked the end of organised Japanese resistance on Los Negros. The end of organised resistance on Los Negros and Manus still left a number of islands in Japanese hands. To minimise civilian casualties, ANGAU quietly evacuated these islands in advance of the American operations. Pityilu was believed occupied by about 60 Japanese. On 30 March the 1st Squadron, 7th Cavalry was transported there from Lorengau by 10 LCMs towing seven LVTs. With the lessons of Hauwei in mind, the landing was covered by bombardment by destroyers, artillery, and two Landing Craft Support, plus an air strike by Kittyhawks and Spitfires. The landing was unopposed, but a strong Japanese position was encountered which was overcome with the aid of artillery and tanks. Some 59 Japanese were killed compared with eight Americans killed and six wounded.

The same treatment was given to Ndrilo and Koruniat on 1 April but the 1st Squadron, 12th Cavalry found them unoccupied. This was notable for being the only amphibious operation of the war carried out by the United States in dugout canoes. The final landing was on Rambutyo on 3 April by the 2nd Squadron, 12th Cavalry. This time, six LCMs and six LCVPs were used instead of the LVTs. As a result, the first waves grounded on a reef and troopers had to wade ashore through the surf. Fortunately for them, there was no opposition. The Japanese, hiding in the interior, were eventually located by ANGAU and 30 Japanese were killed and five captured. Patrols continued hunting for Japanese throughout the islands. Increasingly, the cavalry followed up sightings reported by the natives. On Los Negros, the 302nd Cavalry Reconnaissance Troop killed 48 and captured 15 Japanese during May. On Manus, some 586 Japanese dead were counted and 47 prisoners taken. General Krueger officially declared the campaign over on 18 May.

=== Japanese perspective ===
A diary found on a dead Japanese soldier recounted his last days:

28 March. Last night's duty was rather quiet except for the occasional mortar and rifle fire that could be heard. According to the conference of the various unit leaders, it has been decided to abandon the present position and withdraw. The preparation for this has been made. However, it seems as though this has been cancelled and we will firmly hold this position. Ah! This is honorable defeat and I suppose we must be proud of the way we have handled ourselves. Only our names will remain, and this is something I don't altogether like. Yes, the lives of those remaining, 300 of us, are now limited to a few days.

30 March. This is the eighth day since we began the withdrawal. We have been wandering around and around the mountain roads because of the enemy. We have not yet arrived at our destination but we have completely exhausted our rations. Our bodies are becoming weaker and weaker, and this hunger is getting unbearable.
31 March. Although we are completely out of rations, the march continues. When will we reach Lorengau? Or will this unit be annihilated in the mountains? As we go along, we throw away our equipment and weapons one by one.

1 April. Arrived at native shack. According to a communication, friendly troops in Lorengau cannot help but withdraw. Hereafter there is no choice but to live as the natives do.

== Base development ==
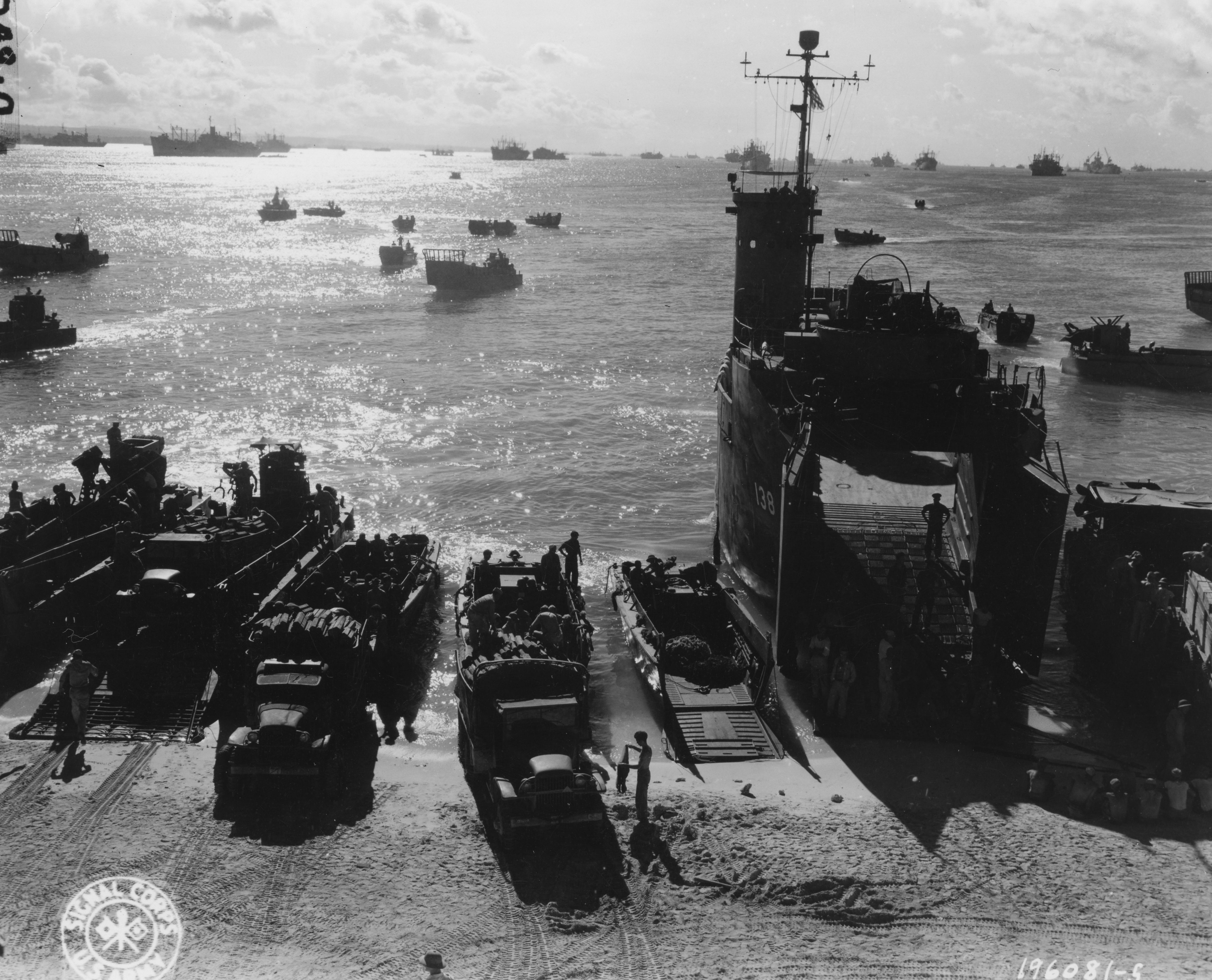
Rations, small arms, ammunition, trucks and miscellaneous equipment are loaded aboard LSMs, LCMs and LCVPs at Seealder Harbor on 7 October 1944

=== Conflict over command ===
Discussions concerning the scope and nature of base development in the Admiralty Islands were held in early February between representatives of SWPA and Admiral William Halsey, Jr.'s neighbouring South Pacific Area (SOPAC). The original intention was forces from SWPA would capture the islands and construct the airbase, while SOPAC would be responsible for the development of the naval base. The SOPAC representatives indicated they would not be able to supply troops or materials in the early stages, so it was resolved SWPA would also undertake the initial stages of naval base development.

Admiral Nimitz recommended to the Joint Chiefs of Staff that development and control of the base facilities be placed under SOPAC by extending its border westward to include the Admiralties. MacArthur was furious; the borders of SWPA could not be changed without the consent of the Australian government. Nimitz's proposal was eventually turned down by the Joint Chiefs but not before MacArthur restricted access to the facilities to ships of the United States Seventh Fleet and British Pacific Fleet. Halsey was summoned to MacArthur's headquarters in Brisbane on 3 March 1944, and the two agreed to a compromise. Responsibility for the development of the base passed from Krueger's Alamo Force to Kinkaid's Allied Naval Forces on 18 May 1944. It was proposed control would ultimately pass to SOPAC but it never did.

=== Airbase development ===
Momote airfield was found to have been constructed on a coral subbase with an overburden of coconut palm humus, over which the Japanese had laid a thin layer of coral and coral sand. This would not withstand heavy use, so 40th Naval Construction Battalion, 8th Engineer Squadron, and Shore Battalion of the 592nd EBSR had to strip away the humus and lay a new coral surface. Just 3,600 feet (1,100 m) of runway was sufficient for the Kittyhawks and Spitfires but the runway was increased to 7,800 feet (2,400 m) by late April. B-24s of 5th Bombardment Group moved in on 18 April 1944 and flew their first mission, against Woleai two days later.

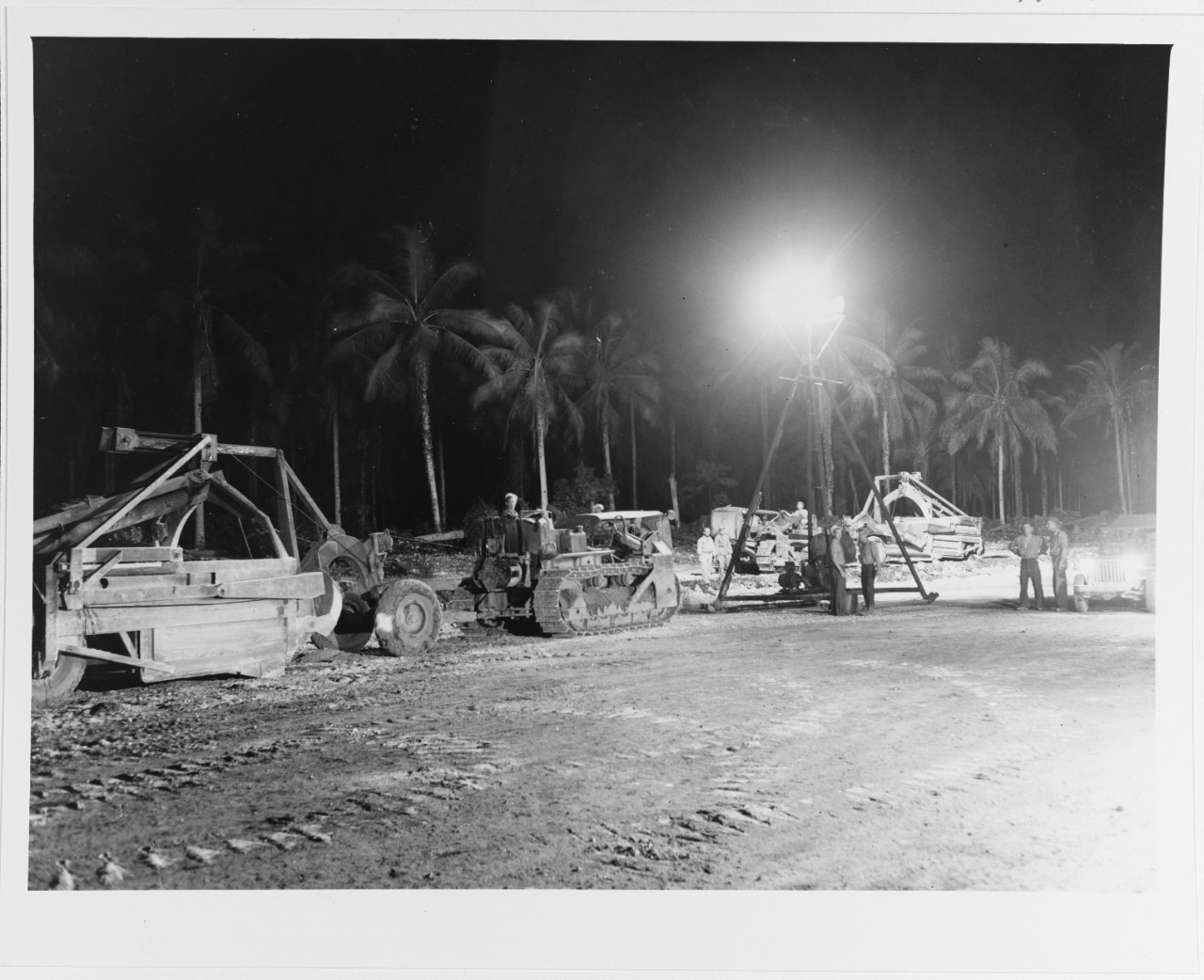
Seabees of the 40th Naval Construction Battalion work on Momote Airfield by night.

Plans called for a second airfield at Salami Plantation, but surveys revealed that the site was unsuitable and a new site was found in a coconut plantation near Mokerang. While the 46th Naval Construction Battalion cleared an access road, the 836th Engineer Aviation Battalion constructed the runway, and the 104th and 46th Naval Construction Battalions built the taxiways and dispersal areas. As at Momote, the humus had to be removed to reach the coral subgrade, which was then graded and compacted. In places the coral was so hard explosives had to be used. The work required the clearing of 1,100 acres (4.5 km^{2}) and the removal of 18,000 coconut trees. B-24s of 307th Bombardment Group (the "Long Rangers") arrived on 21 April 1944. They participated in raids on Biak and supported the Battle of Biak in May.

A fighter base to provide repair and overhaul facilities for carrier aircraft was constructed by the 78th Naval Construction Battalion on Ponam Island. As half of the work area was swamp, coral was blasted and dredged from the ocean bed and used as landfill. Another facility for carrier aircraft was built on Pityilu by the 71st Naval Construction Battalion in May and June 1944, along with accommodation for 2,500 men. The eastern end of Pityilu was cleared and a fleet recreation centre was built that could accommodate up to 10,000 at a time.

=== Naval base development ===
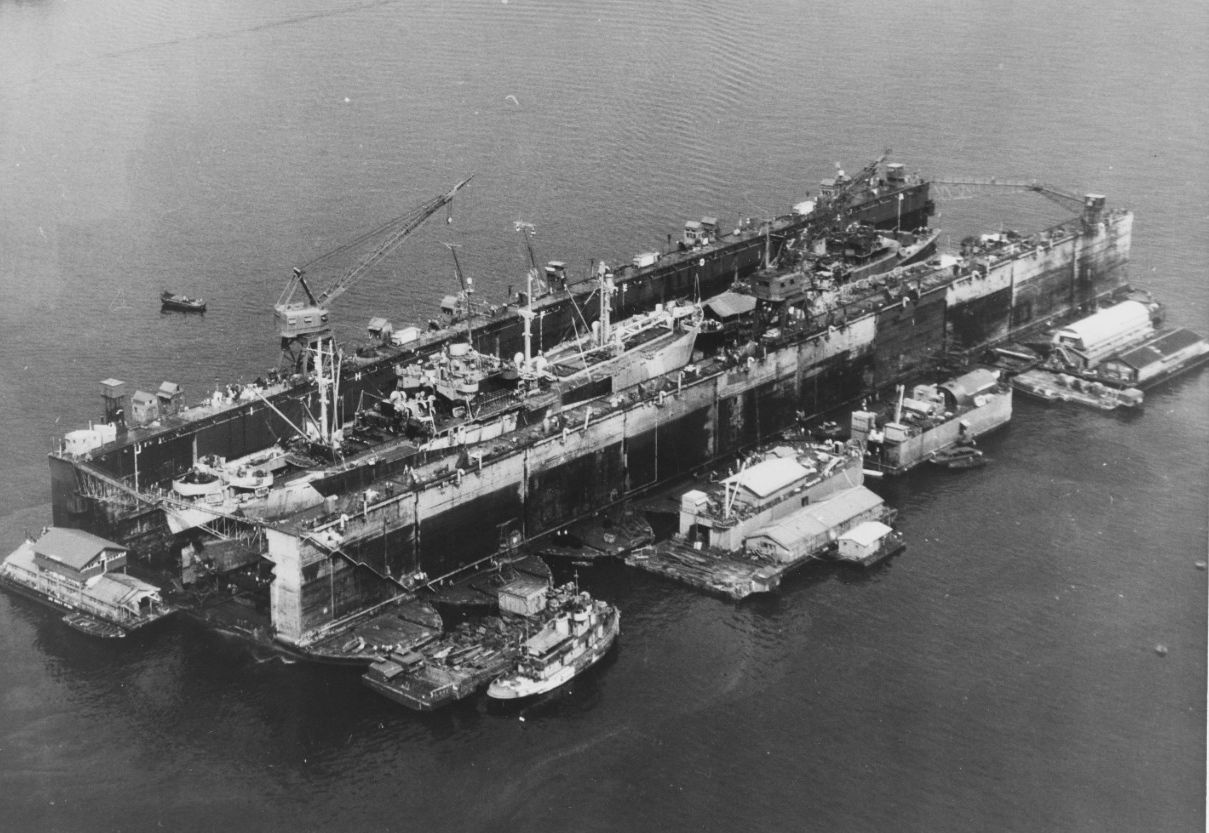
US Navy floating Dry Dock Number 4 in Seeadler Harbor in 1945

Construction of the naval base on Los Negros was the responsibility of the 2nd Naval Construction Regiment, with the 11th, 58th and 71st Naval Construction Battalions. Work included a bulk storage at Papitalai for 500,000 barrels (~68,000 t) of fuel oil, 100,000 barrels (~14,000 t) of distillate, 76,000 barrels (~10,000 t) of avgas and 30,000 barrels (~4,100 t) of mogas; a 500-bed evacuation hospital; two Liberty ship wharves; 24 warehouses and 83 administration buildings in Quonset huts. At Lombrum Point, the Seabees built three installations: a seaplane repair base, a ship repair base, and a landing craft repair base. A 250-long-ton (250 t) pontoon drydock was provided for servicing the landing craft.

Development of facilities on Manus was taken in hand by the 5th Naval Construction Regiment, with the 35th, 44th and 57th Naval Construction Battalions, which arrived in mid-April, and the 140th Naval Construction Battalion, which was attached in June. They erected 128 storage buildings and 50 refrigerators, each of 680 cubic feet (19 m^{3}) capacity. A water supply system was developed to supply 4,000,000 US gallons (15,000,000 L) per day. Two systems were developed, one using streams in the Lombrum area that supplied 2,700,000 US gallons (10,000,000 L) per day, and another for outlying areas that used wells to produce 850,000 US gallons (3,200,000 L) per day. The system included water treatment plants, reservoirs, and pipes. All construction work was completed by April 1945, with the base remaining in use until the end of the war.

== Casualties ==
In his final report on the campaign, General Krueger reported 3,280 Japanese dead had been counted and 75 had been captured. Perhaps 1,100 more were missing, and were never seen again. American casualties were 326 killed, 1,189 wounded, and four missing. Some 1,625 Americans had been evacuated for all causes, including wounds and illness. One Australian was wounded. ANGAU reported one native had been killed and one wounded in action, three were killed by the Japanese, and 20 accidentally killed and 34 wounded by air, artillery, and naval bombardment.

== Analysis ==
The value of the Admiralty Islands to the Allies was enormous. Their capture saved more lives than they cost by obviating the need to capture Truk, Kavieng, Rabaul, and Hansa Bay and thereby speeding up the Allied advance by several months. As an airbase, the Admiralties' value was great, for aircraft based there ranged over Truk, Wewak, and beyond. As a naval base, their value was greater still, as they combined a fleet anchorage with major facilities.

A well-known rule of thumb is that an attacking force needs a 3:1 superiority to ensure success. In the opening stages of the battle of Los Negros, the ratio was more like 1:4. In the end the Allies won, "simply because," wrote Morison, "the United States and Australia dominated that stretch of ocean and the air over it." When queried about the naval support, General Chase replied, "they didn't support us; they saved our necks". Chase's own defensive tactics were also a vital factor. He was awarded the Bronze Star for his part, as was MacArthur.

Allied commanders, and later historians, debated whether the Admiralty Islands Campaign was the bold action of a great commander or a reckless endeavour that courted disaster. Admiral Fechteler felt, "we're damn lucky we didn't get run off the island," and Admiral Barbey, for one, believed the original plan would have resulted in over-running the islands in short order with fewer casualties. It would certainly have been much less risky, but it is doubtful whether an assault on the well-defended beaches of Seeadler Harbour would have resulted in fewer casualties. Whereas, in accelerating both MacArthur and Nimitz's campaigns, it shortened the war by at least a month. Thus, in the final analysis, the campaign "had the great virtue of hastening victory while reducing the number of dead and wounded".

For the Japanese, the loss of the Admiralties meant the loss of their outpost line in the South Eastern Area. Imperial Headquarters now ordered the preparation of a new line in Western New Guinea. The Admiralties operation also indicated the Allies were becoming more ambitious and might bypass Hansa Bay. Accordingly, the Eighteenth Army in New Guinea was ordered to prepare to defend Aitape and Wewak as well.

== See also ==
- Admiralty Islands campaign order of battle
- Manus Naval Base
