= Innis P. Swift =

United States Army general

Innis Palmer Swift
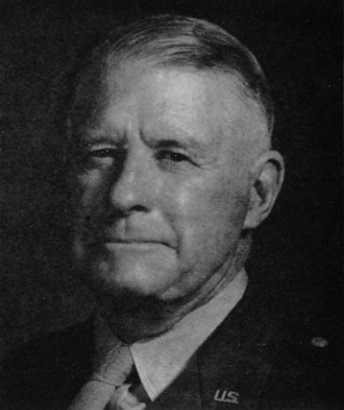
- From the July 1954 edition of Assembly magazine
- Born: February 7, 1882; Fort Laramie, Wyoming, U.S.
- Died: November 3, 1953 (aged 71); San Antonio, Texas, U.S.
- Burial place: Fort Sam Houston National Cemetery in San Antonio, Texas
- Relatives: Grandfathers: Innis N. Palmer; Ebenezer Swift; Father: Eben Swift; Brother in law: Evan H. Humphrey
- Military career
- Allegiance: United States
- Branch: United States Army
- Service years: 1904-1946
- Rank: Major General
- Service number: 0-1969
- Commands: 1st Cavalry Division; I Corps
- Conflicts: Philippine–American War; Mexican Expedition; World War I World War II
- Awards: Distinguished Service Medal; Legion of Merit; Order of the Aztec Eagle (Mexico)

Innis Palmer Swift (February 7, 1882 – November 3, 1953) was a Major General in the United States Army. He was the grandson and namesake of Civil War Major General Innis Newton Palmer, as well as the grandson of Brigadier General Ebenezer Swift. His four decades of military service culminated in his commanding a unit during the liberation of the Philippines in World War II.

== Early life and career ==
Swift was born at Fort Laramie, Wyoming, the son of Major General Eben Swift and Susan Palmer. He graduated from West Point in 1904 and was commissioned in the cavalry. He served as aide-de-camp to General John J. Pershing in the Philippines and then served in Mexico. While a First Lieutenant commanding C Troop, 13th Cavalry, he accompanied First Lieutenant George S. Patton on the hunt for Julio Cardenas, commander of Pancho Villa's personal bodyguard. During World War I he served as Assistant Chief of Staff for the 86th Division.

Swift attended the Army Command and General Staff School, graduating in 1923, and remained at the school as faculty until 1929. He subsequently attended the Army War College and the Army Industrial College

In 1940 he was promoted to Brigadier General, and in 1941 to Major General and placed in command of the 1st Cavalry Division and Fort Bliss. He participated in the Louisiana Maneuvers, where he coined the nickname used by army light observation aircraft when he told a pilot after a bumpy landing, "You looked just like a damn grasshopper!" [Editor's note: There are numerous versions of the story and it is uncertain as to exactly what Swift's words were. The author quoted (Graff) was paraphrasing]

== World War II ==
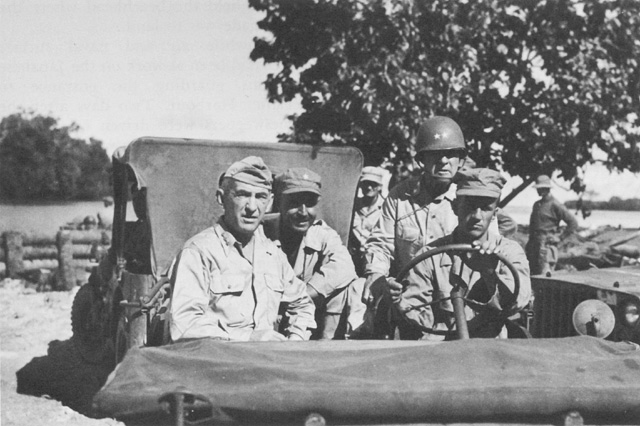
Swift (in helmet behind driver) with Generals Walter Krueger and William C. Chase

He transitioned the division from horse cavalry to essentially an infantry division, though it retained "Cavalry" in the name. He took his division to Australia in July 1942 and remained in command through the Admiralty Islands campaign after which he was reassigned to command I Corps in August 1944. He led I Corps during the liberation of Luzon in the Philippines in late 1944 into 1945. He was the oldest U.S. Corps commander to serve in World War II. After the war he remained a close personal friend of Douglas MacArthur.

== Private life and death ==
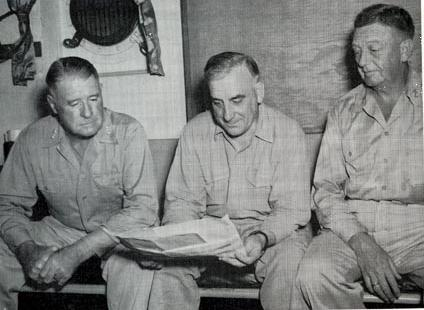
From left to right: Swift, Vice Admiral Daniel E. Barbey, Commander 7th Amphibious Force, Major General Leonard F. Wing, Commander, 43rd Division. January 3, 1945, aboard USS Blue Ridge.

Swift married the former Lucille G. Paddock and the couple had four daughters. After retiring in 1946 he lived in San Antonio. He retained interest in his old command, staying active in the 1st Cavalry Division Association and avidly following the division's activity in Korea. He died at Brooke Army Hospital after a heart attack and was buried in Fort Sam Houston National Cemetery.
