= William C. Chase =

United States Army general (1895–1986)

William Curtis Chase
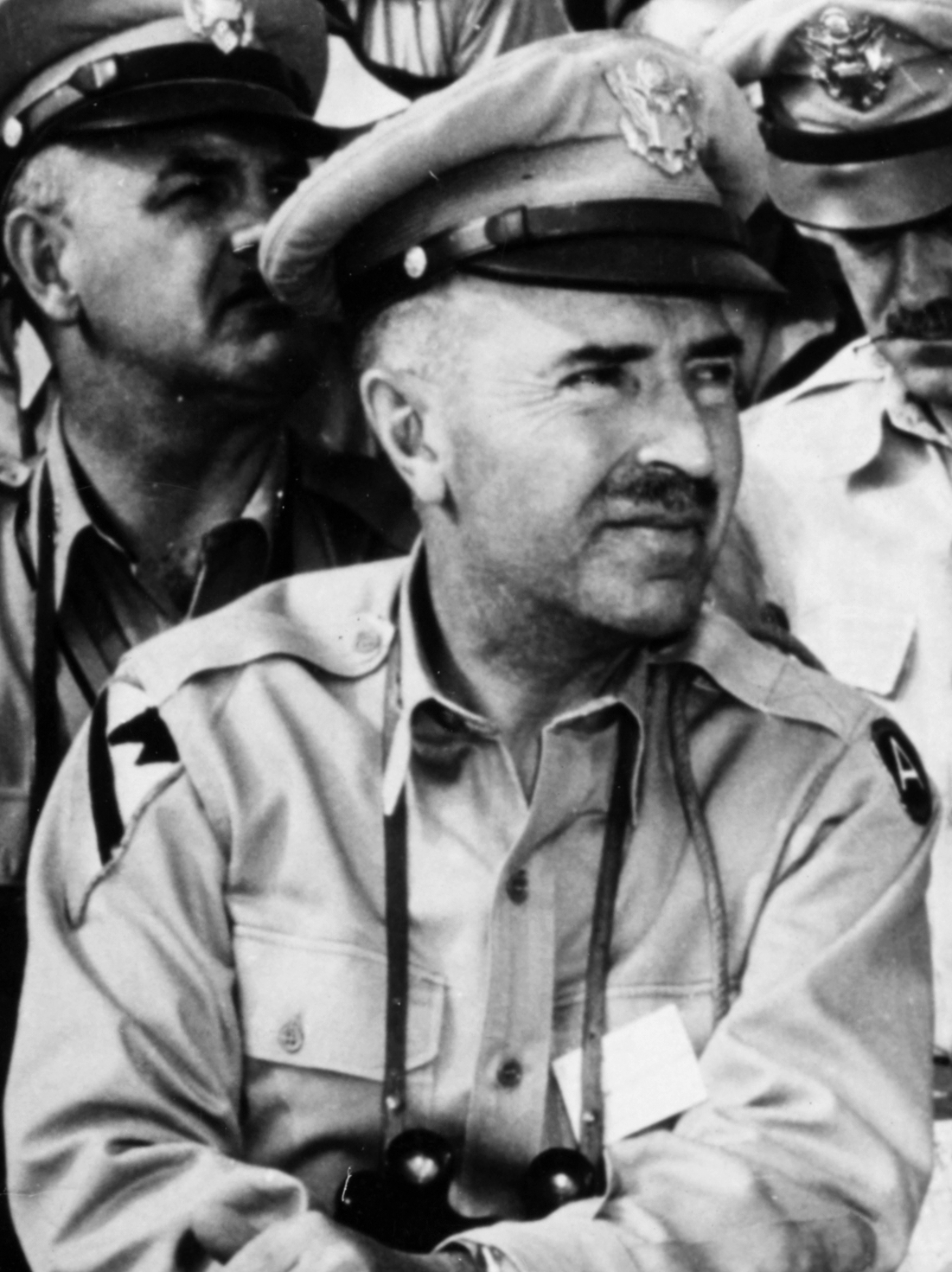
- Major General William C. Chase, U.S. Army, observes "Operation Portrex" D-Day maneuvers on Vieques, Puerto Rico, 8 March 1950.
- Born: March 9, 1895; Providence, Rhode Island, United States
- Died: August 21, 1986 (aged 91)
- Burial place: Fort Sam Houston National Cemetery, Texas, United States
- Military career
- Allegiance: United States
- Branch: United States Army
- Service years: 1916–1955
- Rank: Major General
- Service number: 0-4739
- Unit: Cavalry Branch
- Commands: 113th Cavalry Regiment; 1st Brigade, 1st Cavalry Division; 1st Cavalry Division; 38th Infantry Division
- Conflicts: Pancho Villa Expedition; World War I; Battle of Saint-Mihiel; Meuse-Argonne offensive; Occupation of the Rhineland; World War II; Operation Cartwheel; Admiralty Islands campaign; Philippines campaign; Battle of Leyte; Battle of Luzon; Battle of Bataan; Occupation of Japan; Korean War
- Awards: Distinguished Service Cross; Army Distinguished Service Medal (2); Legion of Merit; Bronze Star (4); Commendation Ribbon; Purple Heart

William Curtis Chase (March 9, 1895 – August 21, 1986) was a major general in the United States Army best known for his service in the South West Pacific Area during World War II and in the Occupation of Japan.

A graduate of Brown University, Chase enlisted in the Rhode Island National Guard in 1913 and served on the Mexican Border. Commissioned as a second lieutenant in the cavalry in January 1917, he served on the Western Front in World War I and in the Occupation of the Rhineland. Between the wars, he attended the Command and General Staff College at Fort Leavenworth, later returning as an instructor.

Chase was promoted to brigadier general in March 1943 on assuming command of the 1st Brigade, 1st Cavalry Division. He was chosen to lead the assault on the Admiralty Islands in February 1944. He resisted the temptation to swiftly overrun the island, and thereby overextend his forces, and formed a defensive perimeter that made good use of the terrain. From this position, he was able to defeat a series of counterattacks by the numerically superior Japanese garrison.

In February 1945, Chase's columns pushed into the northern outskirts of Manila, liberating some 3,700 internees at the University of Santo Tomas which had been turned into an internment camp. He took over command of the 38th Infantry Division, which was confronted by enemy fortifications at Zig-Zag Pass on the Bataan Peninsula that took a week of hard fighting to reduce. Chase assumed command of the 1st Cavalry Division on August 1, 1945. He remained with it in the Occupation of Japan until he returned to the United States in January 1949. Later, he was chief of staff of the Third Army at Fort McPherson and head of the Military Assistance Advisory Group in Taiwan.

On retiring from the Army, he earned a Master of Arts degree in history from Trinity University and taught political science at the University of Houston.

== Education and early life ==
William Curtis Chase was born in Providence, Rhode Island, on March 9, 1896, the son of William Beecher Chase and his wife, Doris Evelyn née Curtis.

He attended Brown University, graduating with a Bachelor of Arts with a Phi Beta Kappa Society key in 1916. While at Brown, Chase enlisted in Battery A, 1st Rhode Island Volunteer Artillery of the Rhode Island National Guard (later Battery A, 103rd Field Artillery Regiment) in 1913.

== World War I ==
On the afternoon of his graduation from Brown in 1916, Chase, now a sergeant, joined Battery A at Quonset Point, Rhode Island, where it was mobilised for duty on the Mexican Border. The unit remained in the El Paso, Texas, area for a time, but saw no action. While there, he passed an examination for commissions in Regular Army. Chase was posted to Fort Leavenworth in January 1917 for a three-month course for newly commissioned officers before being commissioned as a second lieutenant in the cavalry.

Chase was assigned to the 3rd Cavalry, then based at Fort Sam Houston. Shortly after the United States declared war on Germany, he was promoted to first lieutenant and posted to the 6th Cavalry on the Mexican frontier.

Chase attended a machine gun course at Fort Sill, after which he was posted to the 11th Machine Gun Battalion, part of the 4th Division, in April 1918. He served on the Western Front with the 4th Division, participating in the Battle of Saint-Mihiel, but came down with jaundice and missed all but the last days of the Meuse-Argonne Offensive. He participated in the Occupation of the Rhineland before the 4th Division returned to the United States in July 1919.

== Inter-war years ==
On return, Chase was posted to the 16th Cavalry, then in the Rio Grande Valley, although it soon returned to Fort Sam Houston. In 1921 he was posted to Michigan State College for duty with the Reserve Officers' Training Corps. There he met Dorothea Marie Wetherbee. They were married in 1921. They never had children.

Chase attended the United States Army Cavalry School and United States Army Infantry School, followed by duty with the 14th Cavalry at Fort Sheridan, Illinois, from 1927 to 1929. He then attended the Command and General Staff College at Fort Leavenworth. From 1931 to 1934 he served overseas with the 26th Cavalry (Philippine Scouts) at Fort Stotsenburg in the Philippines. Returning to the United States, he was posted as an instructor in Tactics, first at the Cavalry School at Fort Riley and then, from 1938 to 1940, at the Command and General Staff College.

== World War II ==
In 1941 Chase, now a lieutenant colonel, was posted to VIII Corps, then commanded by Major General Walter Krueger. As such, he participated in the Louisiana Maneuvers. In December 1941, he was posted to the Amphibious Force, Atlantic Fleet, then under the command of Major General Holland Smith. Based at Marine Corps Base Quantico, the Amphibious Force practiced Amphibious warfare tactics on Chesapeake Bay.

In 1942, Chase assumed command of the 113th Cavalry, an Iowa National Guard unit. Initially a horse-mechanized unit, the 113th Cavalry soon became fully mechanized. It moved from its original station at Fort Clark, Texas, to Camp Bowie and then to Fort Hood, where it provided school troops for the Tank Destroyer Center.

Chase was promoted to brigadier general in March 1943 on assuming command of the 1st Brigade, 1st Cavalry Division. The division was then stationed at Fort Bliss but was already preparing to move to the South West Pacific. The 1st Cavalry Division had therefore been dismounted, but the division and brigade commanders and their staffs were still on horseback. The 1st Cavalry Division staged at Camp Stoneman. Chase departed from San Francisco on July 3 on the transport USAT George Washington.

The 1st Cavalry Division arrived in Australia and continued its training at Strathpine, Queensland. Training there was more vigorous than at Fort Bliss, and Chase broke his heel bone in a training accident. In December 1943, the 1st Cavalry Division sailed for Oro Bay, where it staged for its next operation, the Admiralty Islands campaign. Chase was chosen to lead the assault. Here, his tactical expertise came to the fore. He resisted the temptation to overrun the island of Los Negros, and thereby overextend his forces, and instead formed a defensive perimeter that made good use of the terrain. From this position, he was able to defeat a series of counterattacks by the numerically superior Japanese garrison. The crisis passed, Chase's force was reinforced by the rest of the division, and the 1st Cavalry Division was then able to overrun the islands. Chase was awarded the Bronze Star for his role in the campaign.

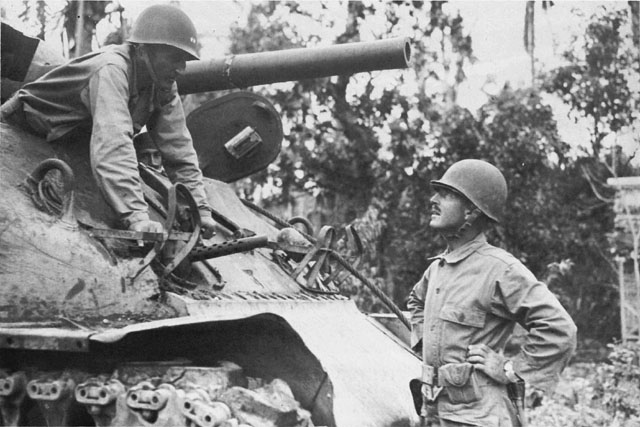
Major General Verne D. Mudge (in tank) confers with Brigadier General William C. Chase in Tacloban.

The 1st Cavalry Division remained in the Admiralty Islands until October, when it boarded ships there for the invasion of Leyte, which it assaulted on October 20, 1944. Chase's 1st Brigade's initial mission was to reconnoiter the hills on the west side of the Tacloban Valley and establish observation posts from which it could command the entrances to the valley. In November, he was ordered to cover the flank of X Corps' advance up the Leyte Valley, and later into the Ormoc Valley. Chase had to move his brigade across mountainous, roadless, uncharted jungle in frequently appalling wet weather. The advance made slow progress against Japanese troops that fought tenaciously all the way.

The 1st Cavalry Division was down to half strength when it was withdrawn from the front line on Leyte for a brief rest in January 1945, but few reinforcements arrived before it was ordered to move to Luzon, where it disembarked over the beaches at San Fabian on January 27, 1945. General of the Army Douglas MacArthur ordered the 1st Cavalry Division's commander, Major General Verne D. Mudge, to conduct a rapid advance on Manila. For this, Mudge formed three flying columns. Initially, Chase's 1st Brigade's mission was to follow one of the columns but on February 1 he was relieved of responsibility for the main body of the 1st Brigade and placed in command of all three flying columns.

On February 3, Chase's columns pushed into the northern outskirts of Manila and seized a vital bridge over the Tuliahan River, which separated them from the city proper. Chase, controlling his columns by radio, suffered slight burns to his hands when a Japanese truck exploded. A squadron of the 8th Cavalry, guided by two Filipino guerrillas reached the sprawling campus of the University of Santo Tomas which had been turned into an internment camp, liberating some 3,700 internees.

A Japanese raiding party destroyed the bridge over Tuliahan River; Chase's security was not good enough. This prevented the main body of the 1st Cavalry Division from linking up with Chase's force in Manila. Supplies were dispatched through the 37th Infantry Division's zone until engineers could build a new bridge. For his advance on Manila, Chase was awarded the Distinguished Service Cross. He was also awarded the Purple Heart for the burns to his hands.

On February 7, 1945, Chase took over command of the 38th Infantry Division, which was then confronted by enemy fortifications at Zig-Zag Pass on the Bataan Peninsula. It took him a week of hard fighting to reduce this position. A battalion of the 151st Infantry under Chase's personal command landed at Mariveles on the southern tip of Bataan on February 14. The 38th Infantry Division participated in the final actions on Corregidor. Units of the 38th Infantry Division assaulted and captured Caballo Island on March 27, Fort Drum on El Fraile Island on April 13, and Carabao Island on April 16. Meanwhile, other elements of the 38th Infantry Division engaged enemy forces in the mountainous Fort Stotsenburg area. In the midst of these operations, Chase was promoted to major general in March.

In late April 1945, the 38th Infantry Division moved to the area east of Manila where it relieved the 6th Infantry Division. On May 1, it began a series of probing attacks prior to an attack on May 4 aimed at capturing the Wawa Dam, an important part of Manila's water supply. Chase had to reduce a series of strongly held Japanese positions. By the end of the month, the dam was secure and the Japanese Kobayashi Force was broken.

Chase assumed command of the 1st Cavalry Division on August 1, 1945. At this time, the division was in the Lucena City area but slated for Operation Downfall, in which it would assault Ariake, Kagoshima. The end of the war precluded this. Instead, the 1st Cavalry Division participated in the Occupation of Japan. It embarked from Batangas on August 25 and disembarked in Tokyo Bay on September 2. From the assembly area in Hara-Machida, Chase lead the convoy through the ruins of the country side, and at the city border stepped out of the jeep and crossed the demarcation line making him the first US officer setting foot in Tokyo, and giving the distinction to the 1st Cavalry Division as "First in Tokyo".

== Later life ==
Chase remained with the 1st Cavalry Division on occupation duties until December 1948, when he temporarily assumed command of IX Corps. He finally returned to the United States in January 1949, and became chief of staff of the Third Army at Fort McPherson in April 1949. From 1951 to 1955 he headed the Military Assistance Advisory Group Taiwan. He retired from the Army on July 31, 1955.

Chase earned a Master of Arts degree in history from Trinity University. From 1957 to 1965, he taught political science at the University of Houston. His wife Dorothea died in 1957. In 1961 he married Mrs Hallie Barlow Olcott. Chase retired in 1965, having reached the state of Texas' mandatory retirement age. In 1974, Chase joined a party of retired generals associated with General MacArthur on a visit to Australia as guests of Lieutenant General Sir Edmund Herring and Dame Mary Herring. In addition to Chase, Leif J. Sverdrup, Hugh John Casey, and LeGrande A. Diller and their wives also made the trip. Chase published his memoirs, entitled Front Line General: The Commands of Maj. Gen. Wm. C. Chase, in 1975.

He died on August 21, 1986, and was buried at Fort Sam Houston National Cemetery.

== Awards ==
- Combat Infantryman Badge
- Distinguished Service Cross
- Distinguished Service Medal with oak leaf cluster
- Legion of Merit
- Bronze Star Medal with three oak leaf clusters
- Army Commendation Medal
- Purple Heart
- Mexican Border Service Medal
- World War I Victory Medal
- American Defense Service Medal
- American Campaign Medal
- Asiatic-Pacific Campaign Medal with four service stars and Arrowhead device
- World War II Victory Medal
- Army of Occupation Medal with "JAPAN" clasp
- National Defense Service Medal
- Distinguished Conduct Star (Philippines)
- Philippine Liberation Medal with two stars

== Bibliography ==
- Ancell, R. Manning; Miller, Christine (1996). The Biographical Dictionary of World War II Generals and Flag Officers: The US Armed Forces. Westport, Connecticut: Greenwood Press. ISBN 0-313-29546-8. OCLC 33862161.
- Chase, William C. (1975). Front Line General: The Commands of Maj. Gen. Wm. C. Chase. Houston, Texas: Pacesetter Press. OCLC 2005322. ISBN 0-88415-295-0.
- Cannon, M. Hamlin (1954). Leyte: The Return to the Philippines. Washington, D.C.: United States Army Center of Military History. OCLC 1259234.
- Frierson, Major William C. (1946). The Admiralties: Operations of the 1st Cavalry Division, 29 February – 18 May 1944. American Forces in Action. Washington, D.C.: United States Army Center of Military History. OCLC 10663708. CMH Pub 100-3. Archived from the original on March 5, 2009.
- Smith, Robert Ross (1963). Triumph in the Philippines. Washington, D.C.: United States Army Center of Military History. OCLC 946510. CMH Pub 5-10.

Military offices
Preceded by Henry L. C. Jones	Commanding General 38th Infantry Division; February–July 1945	Succeeded by Frederick A. Irving
Preceded by Hugh Hoffman	Commanding General 1st Cavalry Division; 1945–1949	Succeeded by John M. Devine
