= Bismarck Archipelago =

Archipelago in Papua New Guinea

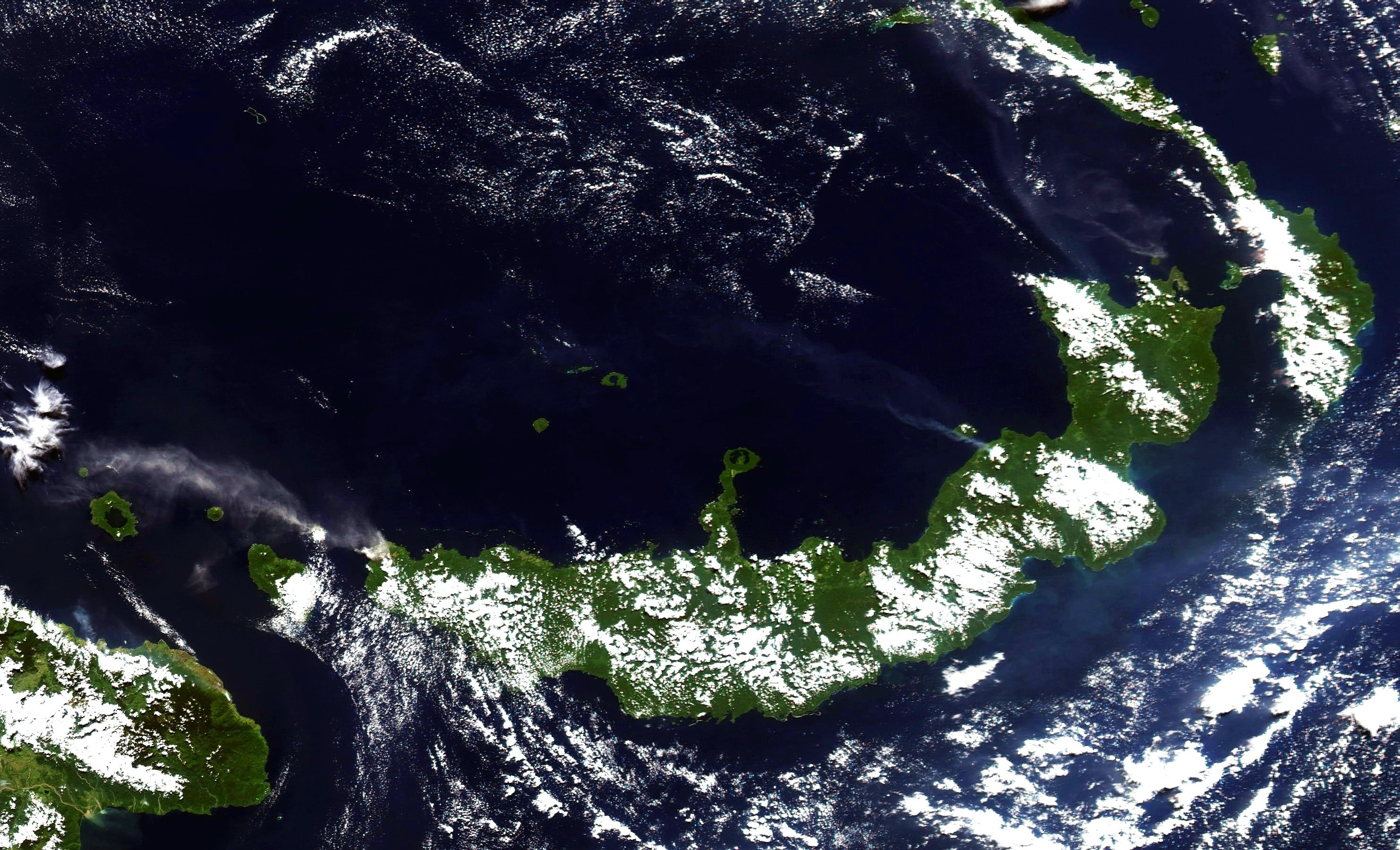
- Satellite view of the islands of New Britain and New Ireland, the two largest in the Bismarck Archipelago

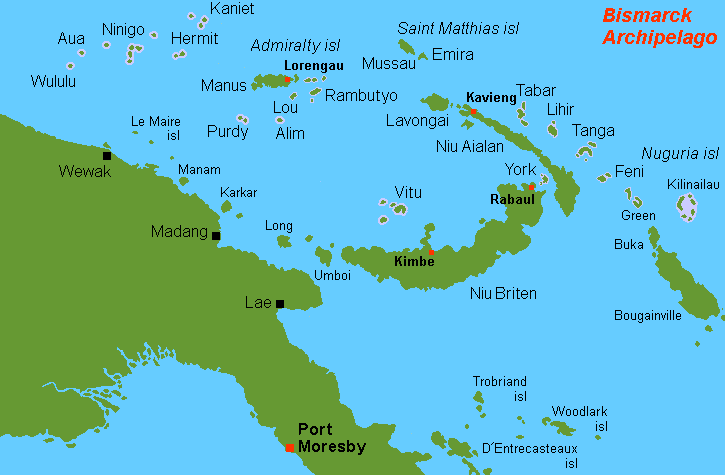

Geography
- Location: Papua New Guinea
- Coordinates: 5°00′S 150°06′E
- Major islands: New Britain, New Ireland
- Area: 49,700 km^{2} (19,200 sq mi)
- Highest elevation: 2,340 m (7680 ft)
- Highest point: Mount Taron

Administration
- Papua New Guinea
- Region: Islands Region

The Bismarck Archipelago (German: Bismarck-Archipel, pronounced [ˈbɪsmaʁk ˌaʁçiˈpeːl]) is a group of islands located just off the northeastern coast of New Guinea in the western Pacific Ocean, part of the Islands Region of Papua New Guinea. Its area is about 50,000 square kilometres (19,000 sq mi).

== History ==
The first inhabitants of the archipelago arrived around 30,000–40,000 years ago. They may have traveled from New Guinea, by boat across the Bismarck Sea or via a temporary land bridge, created by an uplift in the Earth's crust. Later arrivals included the Lapita people, the direct ancestors of the Austronesian peoples of Polynesia, eastern Micronesia, and Island Melanesia.

The first European to visit these islands was Dutch explorer Jacob le Maire in 1616. The islands remained unsettled by western Europeans until they were annexed as part of the German protectorate of German New Guinea in 1884. The area was named in honour of the Chancellor Otto von Bismarck.

On 13 March 1888, a volcano erupted on Ritter Island causing a megatsunami. Almost the entire volcano fell into the ocean, leaving a small rim of the east side of the original island.

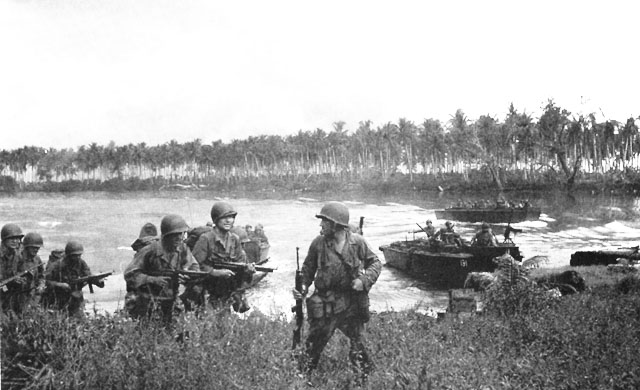
The first wave of US troops lands on Los Negros, Admiralty Islands, 29 February 1944.

Following the outbreak of World War I, the Australian Naval and Military Expeditionary Force seized the islands in 1914 and Australia later received a League of Nations mandate for the islands. They remained under Australian administration—interrupted only by Japanese occupation during World War II—until Papua New Guinea became independent in September 1975.

== Geography ==
The Bismarck Archipelago includes mostly volcanic islands with a total land area of 49,700 km^{2} (19,189 sq mi). The archipelago surrounds the Bismarck Sea and sits upon the North Bismarck Plate, the Manus Plate and the South Bismarck Plate.

Islands are grouped here according to administrative province:

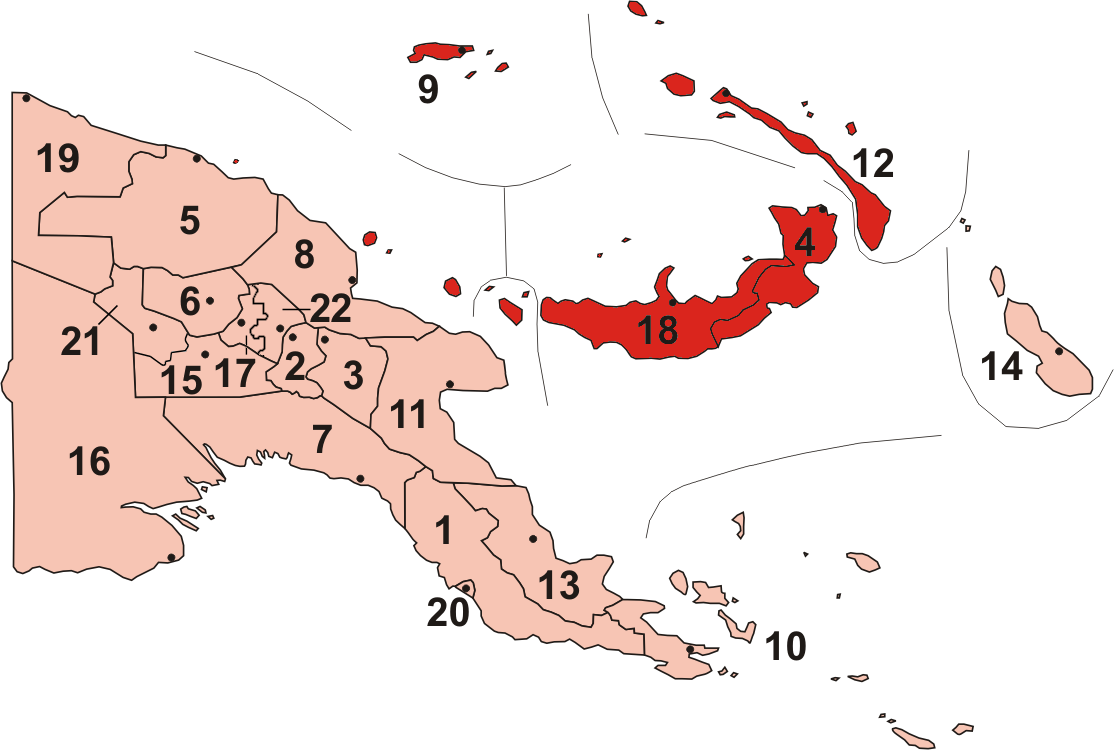
Islands of the Bismarck Archipelago (shown in red) within the Provinces of Papua New Guinea.

- Manus Province (see 9 on the map)
  - Admiralty Islands, group of 18 islands including:
    - Manus Island, main island
    - Los Negros Island
    - Lou Island
    - Ndrova Island
    - Tong Island
    - Baluan Island
    - Pak Island
    - Purdy Islands
    - Rambutyo Island
    - St. Andrews Islands
  - Western Islands, with:
    - Aua Island
    - Hermit Islands
    - Kaniet Islands (Anchorite)
      - Sae Island
    - Ninigo Islands
    - Wuvulu Island
- New Ireland Province (12)
  - New Ireland or also Niu Ailan, main island
  - New Hanover or Lavongai
  - St Matthias Islands
  - Tabar Group
  - Lihir Group
  - Tanga Group
  - Feni Islands
  - Dyaul Island
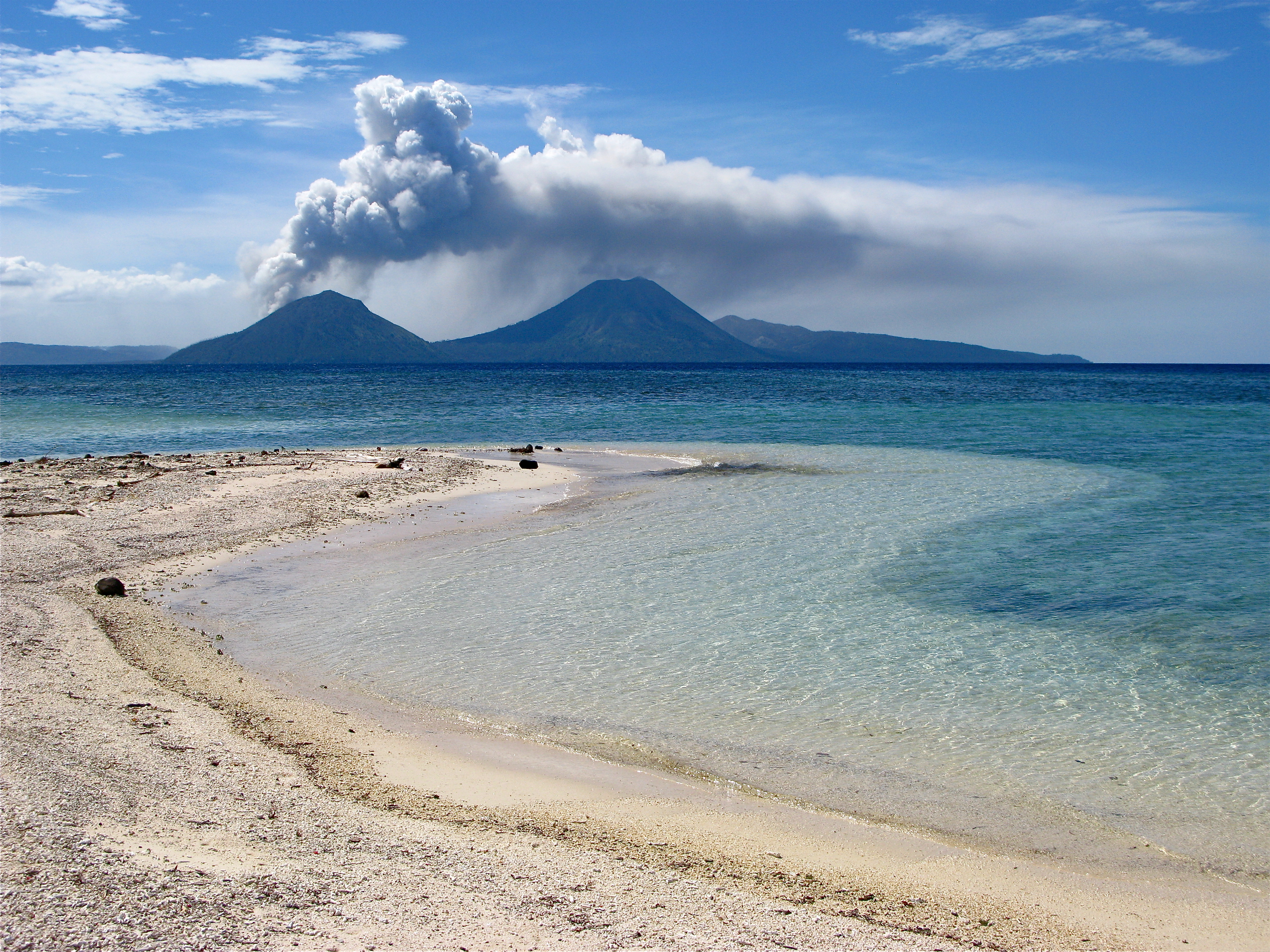
    Rabaul caldera, New Britain
- East New Britain Province (4)
  - New Britain or also Niu Briten, main island
  - Duke of York Islands
    - Duke of York Island
    - Kabakon
    - Kerawara
    - Makada
    - Mioko
    - Mualim
    - Ulu
- West New Britain Province (18)
  - New Britain or also Niu Briten, main island
  - Vitu Islands
- Morobe Province (11)
  - Umboi Island
  - Tolokiwa Island
  - Sakar Island
  - Ritter Island
  - Malai Island
  - Tuam Island
- Madang Province (8)
  - Long Island
  - Crown Island
  - Karkar Island
  - Bagabag Island
  - Manam
- East Sepik Province (5)
  - Schouten Islands

The passage of water between the islands of New Britain and New Ireland is called St. George's Channel after St. George's Channel in the British Isles between Great Britain and Ireland.

== See also ==
- List of islands of Papua New Guinea

== Bibliography ==
- Firth, Stewart (1983). New Guinea Under the Germans. Carlton, Australia: Melbourne University Press. ISBN 0-522-84220-8.
- Howe, K. R., Robert C. Kiste, Brij V. Lal, eds. (1994). Tides of History: The Pacific Islands in the Twentieth Century. Honolulu: University of Hawaii Press. ISBN 0-8248-1597-1.
- King, David et al. (1982). Papua New Guinea Atlas: A Nation in Transition. Bathurst, Australia: R. Brown and the University of Papua New Guinea. ISBN 0-909197-14-8.
- Moore, Clive (2003). New Guinea: Crossing Boundaries and History. Honolulu: University of Hawaii Press. ISBN 0-8248-2485-7.
- Ryan, Peter, ed. (1972). Encyclopedia of Papua New Guinea. 3 volumes; Vol I: A – K, maps, black and white illustrations, xv + 588pp. Vol II: l – Z, maps, black and white illustrations, 589–1231pp. Vol III: Index, folding colour map in rear pocket, map, colour illustration, v + 83pp. Carlton, Australia: Melbourne University Press. ISBN 978-0-522-84025-4.
