= Hernsheim & Co. =

German trading company

- Hernsheim & Co.'s company flag circa 1880
- Company type: Trading company
- Industry: international trade crop production growing of oleaginous fruits
- Founded: 1875; 150 years ago in Sydney, Australia
- Founders: Eduard Hernsheim and Franz Hernsheim
- Defunct: 1938
- Headquarters: Hamburg, Germany
- Area served: Pacific Ocean
- Products: Copra export
- Parent: Robertson & Hernsheim

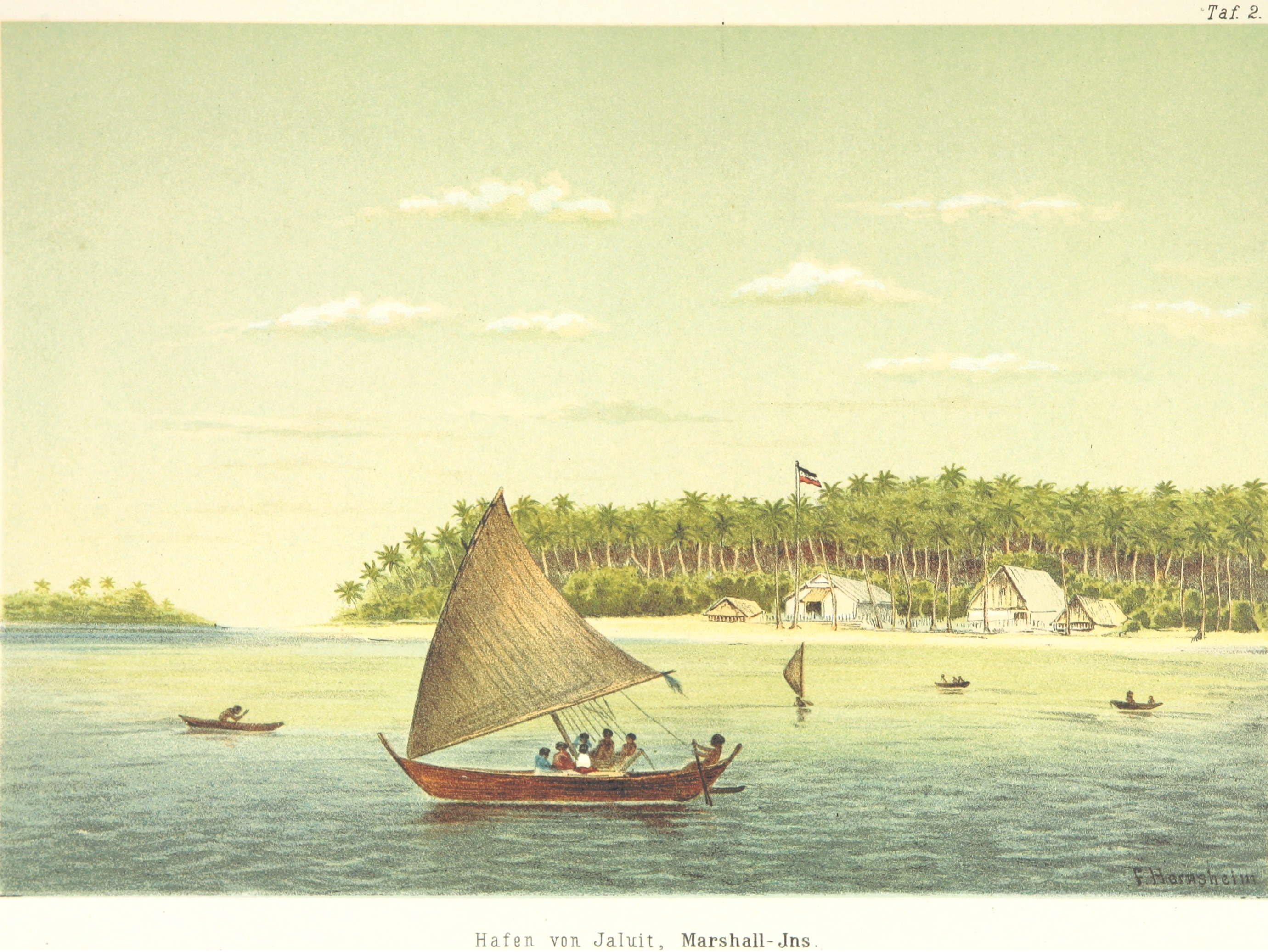
Jaluit station, Marshall Islands, c. 1880. Picture published in Südsee-Erinnerungen, p 123.

Hernsheim & Co. was a German trading company in the Western Pacific Ocean with main offices on Yap in the Caroline Islands, Jaluit in the Marshall Islands and Matupi in the Bismarck Archipelago. Hernsheim & Co. mainly specialized in the copra export to Europe. After the loss of their Pacific possessions in the aftermath of World War I, the company attempted a new beginning in the French Mandate of Cameroon in Africa. In the heyday of their ”South Sea" business (circa 1882–1885), Hernsheim & Co. exported almost 30% of the copra produced in the Western Pacific Ocean. Many of their agents were also dealers in ethnographic objects.

== In the Pacific ==
=== Founding (1875) ===
Hernsheim & Co. was founded in November 1875 by the brothers Franz and Eduard Hernsheim in Sydney, Australia. The starting capital consisted of various trading stations already built by Eduard Hernsheim on Malakal (Koror, Palau), Nif and Tomil (Caroline Islands) and Niata (Duke of York Islands), and the schooner Coeran. Franz Hernsheim put in M 50,000. Ruben Jonas Robertson, an uncle of the Hernsheims, offered additional loans, together forming the parent company Robertson & Hernsheim in Hamburg.

=== First Expansion (1876-1882) ===
Between January and August 1876 Eduard Hernsheim conducted reconnaissance trips which led to the founding of Makada, the initial central station for the Bismarck Archipelago on the island Makada in the Duke of York Islands. A second central station, Jaluit, was founded for the Marshall Islands on the island of Jabor (Jaluit Atoll) followed. In addition, five dealers were contracted in the Ratak Chain of the eastern Marshall Islands. Lasty, a trading post was also probably founded on Ponape (formerly Pohnpei, on the Caroline Islands).

From the middle of 1876, the agent J. T. Blohm made trade contacts with the Talilibai and Kabaira on northern beaches of the Gazelle Peninsula, as well as the district of Birara in the southern Blanche Bay, all in New Britain. By 1883, more stations were founded on the Gazelle Peninsula: Kurakaul, Ragunai, Kabaira, Vlavolo / Nogai and Pulpul / Kabaira (northern beaches), and Rolavio (the port island of Matupi, Blanche Bay), Ruluana, Urakukuni, Ululai, Lagumgum, Tarram and Tawana (bank of the Blanche Bay / District Birara).

In June 1879, due to a malaria epidemic, the central station for the New Britain Archipelago was moved from Makada to Matupi. The existing station on there had its factory expanded, and supplemented by a second factory on the east coast of the island.

In February 1880, at the beginning of another series of exploratory voyages, now with the smaller vessels Pacific and Alice, once again new stations were founded, now in the village of Pakail and on the port island of Nusa in northern New Ireland. These trade relations were extended by the agent Friedrich Schulle to the east coast of New Ireland (Kablaman, Butbut, Navangai, Lamerotte, Lagumbanje, Lauaru and Kapsu stations).

Other reconnaissance trips by Eduard Hernsheim only saw sporadic establishment of new stations: Woleai atoll (formerly Uleai) in March 1878, Kosrae (formerly Kusaie) in the Caroline Islands in August 1878, Nauru in September 1878, Carcone in the Hermit Islands in June 1879 and Oberlark in the Laughlan Islands in the Louisiade Archipelago, beginning probably in 1881.

Franz Hernsheim took over the management of the Jaluit business in 1877 and established in early 1878 a ship connection to the Gilbert Islands, over which copra purchases from the islands of Apamama, Aranuka and Kuria were introduced to the central warehouse on Jabor from 1883/84 onwards. He lived on Jaluit and served as the German Consul. By 1885 at the German acquisition of the Marshalls he was still there, but left the island in January 1886 to return to Europe.

For the business on Yap or St. David's Island, in March 1878 and March 1880 the American captains C. P. Holcomb and D. D. O'Keefe were hired as general agents. However, these connections were resolved again in April 1884.

=== Introduction of "Agent System" (1882-1885) ===
The expansion of Hernsheim & Co.'s field of activity to a large part of the Western Pacific Ocean and the exploding operating costs to maintain traffic between the three main stations on Yap, Jaluit and Matupi forced the company to consolidate in October 1882. Instead of small drifters, the inter-island traffic was increasingly provided by cheaper sailing ships and the import and export to and from Europe were outsourced to charter vessels. In the New Britain Archipelago, the number of trading stations was reduced and the exchange transaction was transferred to independent agents who regulated the traffic with local negotiators or suppliers in their own. From October 1885, through the partnership with Mouton, Dupré & Co. the former dealer Friedrich Schulle acted as a general agent for northern Gazelle Peninsula in New Ireland. The general agent for Yap was Robert Friedländer. He had been sent out by the Hamburg parent company since December 1883. A cutthroat competition in the Marshall Islands with the German Trade and Plantation Company of the South Sea Islands of Hamburg (Deutsche Handels- und Plantagen-Gesellschaft, DHPG) forced Hernsheim & Co. to unite their possessions there with those of their rivals.

=== Concentration on Matupi and Diversification (1886-1892) ===
Upon the declaration of protectorate status by the German Empire over the New Kingdom Archipelago (renamed thereafter as the Bismarck Archipelago) in late-1884, Hernsheim & Co. reacted with a restructuring of their company possessions. The branches on the Marshall and Yap islands were merged with those of the DHPG to form the Jaluit Company (Jaluit-Gesellschaft) in December 1887. In contrast, the Matupi branch was outsourced, taken over by Eduard Hernsheim in sole responsibility and converted into the Hernsheim & Co. OHG in 1888/89.

Following individual deliveries to SMS Habicht, Carola, Hyäne and Albatros, as well as to HMS Espiègle and Dart on the English side, Hernsheim & Co. OHG was able to get a coal supply contract with the Imperial German Navy signed by the Hamburg parent company Robertson & Hernsheim with the British Royal Navy, extended repeatedly until the outbreak of World War I in 1914. This, as well as supply contracts with various small businesses and public entities in the German protectorate, including the Wesleyan Mission, allowed the company to cross-finance its co-buyer business and give it a competitive edge ahead of DHPG and E.E. Forsayth. Increasing profits from 1888 onwards led to its conversion into a limited partnership in 1901 and finally, in 1909, into a corporation (Aktiengesellschaft) in the form of Hernsheim & Co. AG, based in Hamburg with a registered capital of 1.2 million marks.

=== Second Expansion and Plantation Economy (1893-1914) ===
Maximilian Thiel was in charge for new management on the Bismarck Archipelago which included the Admiralty Islands (Komuli and Manus stations), the Ninigo Islands, the Solomon Islands (Bouka and Choiseul stations), the St. Matthias Islands and the Portland Islands. Due to spacing issue the main station was relocated in 1912 from Matupi to Rabaul.

An intensive plantation strategy in the same veins as those of the DHPG and E.E. Forsayth was applied by the new Hernsheim & Co. AG. The company operated labor-intensive plantations involving the importation of foreign workers in the grasslands near Rabaul and on their property on Makada (Duke of York Islands), as well as on Nusa, Nusalik and Pakail (New Ireland). Through expanding their palm tree cultivation in 1912 the company increased its share capital by M 600,000.

== In Australia and Cameroon ==
=== Participation in the Melanesia Company (1928-1930) ===
After the end of World War I and the Treaty of Versailles, all possessions of Hernsheim & Co. AG in the former German New Guinea were confiscated by the Australian Mandate Authority. After the passing of the War Indemnification Law in 1928 the company received from Germany 13% of their recognized claim for damages in the sum of 14 million marks plus a rebuilding surcharge of 2%. Together with the Hamburg South Sea Company (Hamburgische Südsee-Aktiengesellschaft, HASAG), Hernsheim & Co. acquired a stake in the London-based Melanesia Company Ltd., which had acquired parts of both German companies' properties in New Guinea. As a result of the Wall Street crash of 1929, the Melanesia Company ran into trouble; a joint attempt by HASAG and Hernsheim & Co. to sell their shares failed. After a collapse of the copra market in 1930, the plantations run by the Melanesia Company had to be sold at such a low price that not even the preferred main creditors – which included neither HASAG nor Hernsheim & Co. – could be satisfied.

=== Ventures in Edéa (1928-1939) ===
As part of the so-called "prior compensation", Hernsheim & Co. AG received a share of 900,000 Reichsmarks, – of their recognized claim for damages from the Weimar government. The former managing director for the Bismarck Archipelago, Maximilian Thiel, now CEO in Hamburg, initially invested this sum in the Dutch East Indies. From 1928 he also participated in the production of palm oil in Edéa in French Cameroon. Because of further collapses in the copra and palm oil market, the company had to accept new heavy losses from 1930, so that a settlement was only possible through write-offs and the inclusion of a mortgage on the property in Edéa. After 1932, the shares of Hernsheim & Co. circulated only with a "memorial value" of 1 Reichsmark in the books. After losses had been written without exception in the following years, the company initiated liquidation on January 7, 1939.
