= Mualim =

Mualim (معلم) is an Arabic word for teacher. It can refer to:

- Al-Mualim, a character in the Ubisoft videogame Assassin's Creed
- Mualim (District), the eleventh district in Perak, Malaysia
- Mualim Island, a small island in group of Duke of York Islands in the Bismark Archipelago, Papua New Guinea
