= Kokopo sea tragedy =

2026 maritime disaster

The Kokopo sea tragedy was the sinking of two unnamed civilian vessels en route from the Duke of York Islands to Kokopo, capital of East New Britain Province, Papua New Guinea, on 18 July 2026. Of the 29 people aboard both boats, 27 died, making it Papua New Guinea's worst maritime disaster since the sinking of the MV Rabaul Queen in 2012.

== Sinking ==
Two ships involved in a birthday celebration at a beach resort on Pangpang Island, left at 3:30 pm on 18 July 2026 for Kokopo, a 20 km (12 mi) journey. Whilst near Pigeon Island, a swell lifted one of the boats, causing it to bow straight into the water, capsizing it. The second boat, arriving soon after, attempted to help people back onto the boat but became overwhelmed and capsized as well, with the strong currents of the area quickly scattering all passengers.

== Search efforts ==
At 4:51 pm a member of the Duke of York LLG notified the Provincial Disaster Office, and an immediate search began. Two survivors, both skippers of the vessels, floated to Baai village near Rabaul, where they were rescued by villagers six hours after the sinking. Efforts continued the next day with six banana boats, a Royal Papua New Guinea Constabulary ship and a Police patrol vessel all participating in the search, but ultimately found no survivors or debris. The search ended with a helicopter being flown in from Lae to assist in the efforts, proceeding to discover one of the overturned boats near Messi village in New Ireland before the search had to be called off for the day due to adverse weather. The first two bodies were found washed ashore by villagers on Dyaul Island, with a third being discovered at sea. Thirteen bodies were discovered by 24 July, with a 14th being discovered on 31 July; after which the call for survivors was officially called off.

== Aftermath ==
The accident was one of several in Papua New Guinea within the same time period, with unrelated accidents and searches for survivors underway in New Ireland, Bougainville, and Milne Bay Province; something that was blamed on the exceptionally rough winds strengthened by the 2026–2027 El Niño event. The disasters resulted in calls to strengthen maritime safety regulations. The PNG Ports Corporation donated K100000 to the families of the victims. Multiple vigils were held in memory of the victims. On July 29, a criminal investigation into the disaster was announced by the East New Britain Provincial Police.
