= Manus monarch =

Conservation status
- Near Threatened (IUCN 3.1)

Scientific classification
- Kingdom: Animalia
- Phylum: Chordata
- Class: Aves
- Order: Passeriformes
- Family: Monarchidae
- Genus: Symposiachrus
- Species: S. infelix

Binomial name
- Symposiachrus infelix (Sclater, PL, 1877)

Subspecies
- See text

Synonyms
- Monarcha infelix

Species of bird

The Manus monarch (Symposiachrus infelix), also called the Admiralty Islands monarch, the Admiralty monarch, the Admiralty pied monarch, the somber monarch and the unhappy monarch, is a species of bird in the family Monarchidae. It is endemic to the Admiralty Islands of Papua New Guinea.

Its natural habitats are subtropical or tropical moist lowland forests and subtropical or tropical mangrove forests. It is threatened by habitat loss.

== Taxonomy and systematics ==
The Manus monarch was originally placed in the genus Monarcha until moved to Symposiachrus in 2009.

=== Subspecies ===
There are two subspecies recognized:

- S. i. infelix - (P.L. Sclater, 1877): Found on Manus Island
- S. i. coultasi - (Mayr, 1955): Found on Rambutyo and Tong Islands
