= Ulu (island) =

Island in Papua New Guinea

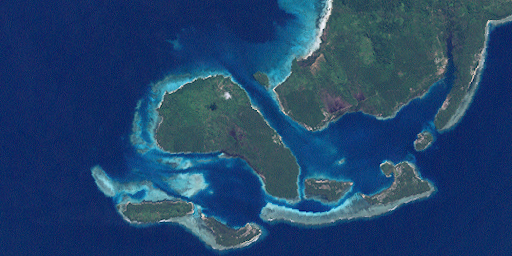
- Ulu island, center left, in the Duke of York Islands group. NASA Landsat 7 image, 2000.

- Location within Papua New Guinea

Geography
- Location: Melanesia
- Coordinates: 4°13′0″S 152°25′0″E
- Archipelago: Solomon Islands
- Adjacent to: Solomon Sea
- Highest elevation: 1 m (3 ft)

Administration
- Papua New Guinea
- Province: East New Britain Province
- Capital city: Port Moresby
- Largest settlement: Port Moresby
- Prime Minister: Peter O'Neill

Ulu Island is the second largest island in the Duke of York island group. It is situated between Duke of York Island and Kabakon and Kerawara islands.

The island is on Papua New Guinea Time (PGT). This works out as UTC/GMT +10:00 hours. They do not observe Daylight saving time.

The word Ulu means breadfruit.

== Other names ==
Ulu is also known as Mauke Island or Pig Island.
