= Saint Andrews Islands =

Island group in Papua New Guinea

St. Andrews Islands
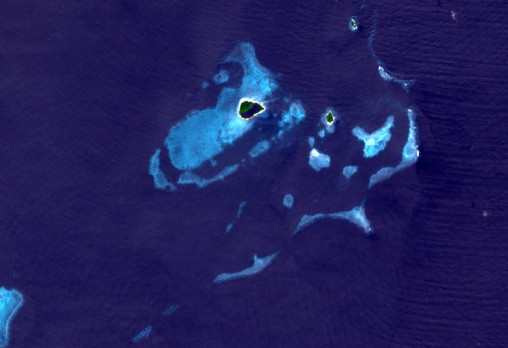
- Satellite image of St. Andrews Islands

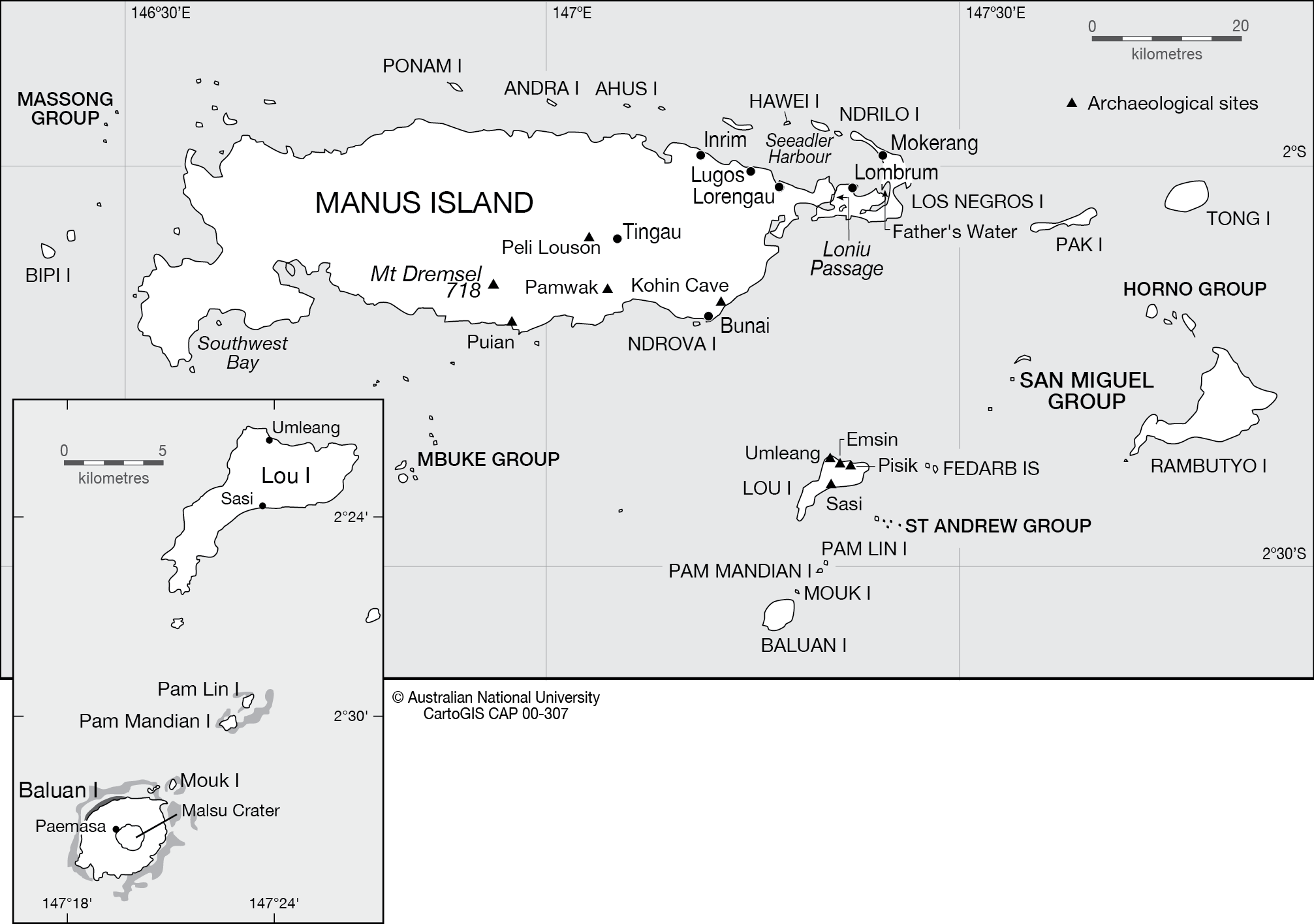
- St. Andrews Islands are to the southeast of Lou Island

Geography
- Coordinates: 2.45818°S 147.39638°E
- Archipelago: Admiralty Islands
- Adjacent to: Pacific Ocean

Administration
- Papua New Guinea
- Province: Manus Province

The St. Andrews Islands are an island group of the Admiralty Islands, part of the Bismarck Archipelago, located in northern Papua New Guinea. The main island is Waikatu Island (Andrew Island). The other islands are Ngowui (Violet), Paliai (Bull) and Kumuli (Broadmead).
