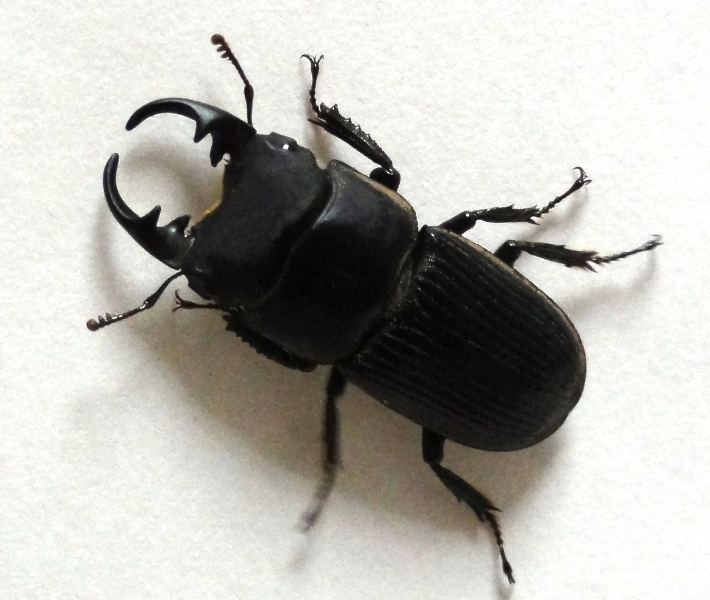
- Aegus laevicollis

Scientific classification
- Kingdom: Animalia
- Phylum: Arthropoda
- Clade: Pancrustacea
- Class: Insecta
- Order: Coleoptera
- Suborder: Polyphaga
- Infraorder: Scarabaeiformia
- Family: Lucanidae
- Subfamily: Lucaninae
- Tribe: Aegini
- Genus: Aegus; MacLeay, 1819

Species
- ~228 See text

Synonyms
- Aegus (Micraegus) Maes, 1992; Aegus (Odontaegus) Kriesche, 1935; Aegus (Elsion) Kriesche, 1920; Aegus (Malietoa) Kriesche, 1920; Eubussea Zacher, 1913; Aegus (Pseudaegus) Heller, 1900; Xenostomus Boileau, 1898; Paraegus Gahan, 1888

= Aegus (beetle) =

Genus of beetles

Aegus is a genus of stag beetles in the family Lucanidae. Comprising about 260 species in the genus, they are placed in the largest subfamily Lucaninae. They are distributed in South Asia, Southeast Asia and the Pacific countries, but introduced accidentally to many parts of the islands.

Primarily saproxylic, adult beetles and grubs are commonly found in decaying wood and stumps with abundant fungal growth.

== Distribution ==
Members of this genus are found from Sikkim (India) to Japan and American Samoa including northeastern India, Sri Lanka, Bhutan, Myanmar, China, Laos, Thailand, Vietnam, Cambodia, Taiwan, southern South Korea, Japan, Malaysia, Singapore, Indonesia, Brunei, the Philippines, Micronesia, East Timor, Papua New Guinea, New Caledonia, Solomon Islands, Vanuatu, Fiji, Samoa, American Samoa, Christmas Island and Queensland (Australia). They have also been introduced to the Seychelles and Madagascar.

Aegus species reach the greatest diversity in areas like Malaysia, Indonesia, China and Papua New Guinea.

== Species ==
Next species are included in the genus Aegus:

=== Subgenus Aegotypus Parry, 1874 ===
- Aegus acanthinus Didier, 1928 - Malaysia (Sabah and Sarawak)
- Aegus armatus Boileau, 1897
- Aegus curvimaxillaris (Lacroix, 1978) - Malaysia (Pahang)
- Aegus igarashiae Fujita, 2010
- Aegus naomii Nagai in Mizunuma & Nagai, 1994 - Indonesia (West Kalimantan)
- Aegus oberthueri (Nagai, 1994) - Indonesia (West Kalimantan)
- Aegus shimanei Nagai in Mizunuma & Nagai, 1994 - Indonesia (West Sumatra)
- Aegus trilobatus Parry, 1862 - Indonesia (West Kalimantan, West Sumatra and South Sumatra) and Malaysia (Sabah, Sarawak)

=== Subgenus Aegus MacLeay, 1819 ===
- Aegus acervus Nagai in Mizunuma & Nagai, 1994 - Malaysia (Sabah)
- Aegus acuminatus (Fabricius, 1801) - From southern Thailand and Luzon Island (Philippines) to Ambon Island (Indonesia)
- Aegus acutangulus Nagel, 1941 - Malaysia (Sabah)
- Aegus acutifrons Bomans, 1993 - Indonesia (Kai Islands)
- Aegus ambiguus De Lisle, 1970 - Indonesia (North Sumatra)
- Aegus amplus Nagai, 1994 - central Vietnam, Laos, Thailand and Myanmar
- Aegus angustanus Kriesche, 1920 - Papua New Guinea (East Sepik)
- Aegus angustus Bomans, 1989 - China (Zhejiang, Fujian, Hubei, Guangdong and Sichuan)
- Aegus atricolor Didier, 1928 - Vietnam (Tonkin)
- Aegus beauchenei Möllenkamp, 1902 - Myanmar (Karen), Vietnam (Tonkin) and southern China?
- Aegus bidens Möllenkamp, 1902 - Vietnam (Tonkin) and China (Zhejiang, Guangxi, Guangdong and Yunnan)
- Aegus bidentatus Nagel, 1939 - Mussau and New Britain Islands (Papua New Guinea)
- Aegus bigibbosus (Ritsema, 1897) - Malaysia (Pahang, Sabah and Sarawak) and Indonesia (West Kalimantan, North Sumatra, West Sumatra and South Sumatra)
- Aegus bisacutus Bomans & Bartolozzi, 1989 - Malaysia (Sabah)
- Aegus bison Möllenkamp, 1912 - Indonesia (Borneo and Sumatra)?
- Aegus blandus Parry, 1864 - Indonesia (Papua and Salawati Island). It may also be present in the Moluccas Islands
- Aegus burgersi Kriesche, 1920 - Papua New Guinea (East Sepik)
- Aegus callosilatus Bomans, 1989 - China (Fujian)
- Aegus celebensis De Lisle, 1967 - Indonesia (Central Sulawesi and South Sulawesi)
- Aegus cervicornis Didier, 1925 - Malaysia (Sarawak) and Indonesia (West Kalimantan)
- Aegus chelifer MacLeay, 1819 - Thailand, Singapore, Laos, Vietnam, Cambodia, Malaysia, Singapore, Indonesia (west of Wallace line). Introduced to Taiwan, Madagascar and the Seychelles. It may also be present in Myanmar, India, Bangladesh, Sri Lanka and Andaman and Nicobar islands
- Aegus circinatus Bomans, 1992 - Luzon Island (Philippines)
- Aegus constrictcollis Nagel, 1928 - Malaysia (Sarawak)
- Aegus coomani Didier, 1926 - Vietnam (Tonkin), China (Guangxi, Yunnan) and Laos
- Aegus corniculatus Didier, 1928 - Laos (Xiangkhouang)
- Aegus crassicrenatus Bomans, 1993 - Borneo?
- Aegus crucifer Nagel, 1933 - Papua New Guinea
- Aegus currani Felsche, 1912 - Luzon Island (Philippines)
- Aegus curtisi Waterhouse, 1890 - Indonesia (West Sumatra). It may also be present on Borneo
- Aegus curvus Didier, 1928 - Vietnam (Tonkin)
- Aegus cyclocerus De Lisle, 1974 - Indonesia (Arfak

Mountains on Papua)

- Aegus debatissei Bomans, 1991 - Indonesia (Central Sulawesi)
- Aegus delicatus Arrow, 1943 - Malaysia (Perak)
- Aegus dispar Didier, 1931 - China (Sichuan, Hunan, Yunnan, Zhejiang and Fujian)
- Aegus dissimilis Bomans, 1988 - Papua New Guinea (Kassem Pass)
- Aegus duplodentatus Nagel, 1936 - Malaysia (Perak and Pahang)
- Aegus ellipticus Boileau, 1902 - Lavongai Island (Papua New Guinea)
- Aegus eschscholtzii (Hope & Westwood, 1845) - From West Bengal (India) across Southeast Asia to China and Japan, extending to Borneo (Sarawak) and possibly Java.
- Aegus excavatus Lacroix, 1982 - India (Meghalaya)
- Aegus exilis Nagai, 1994 - Malaysia (Sabah) and Indonesia (East Kalimantan)
- Aegus fallax De Lisle, 1967 - Papua New Guinea (Huon Peninsula)
- Aegus foraminatus (Most likely an A. platyodon subspecies) Albers, 1889 - Duke of York and New Ireland Islands (Papua New Guinea)
- Aegus fornicatus MacLeay, 1819 - Indonesia (North Sumatra, West Sumatra, South Sumatra and Lampung)
- Aegus frontalis Bomans, 1991 - Indonesia (Central Sulawesi)
- Aegus fujitaorum Nagai in Mizunuma & Nagai, 1994 - Malaysia (Pahang)
- Aegus fukiensis Bomans, 1989 - Vietnam (Sapa) and China (Fujian, Guangdong, Hunan, Sichuan, Guangxi)
- Aegus fulgens Bomans, 1993 - Waigeo Island (Indonesia)
- Aegus glomerosus (Probably placed in the wrong genus) Bomans, 1993 - New Hebrides Islands and Ambrim Island (Vanuatu)
- Aegus gracilis Deyrolle, 1865 - Indonesia (Ambon, Saparua, Seram, Amboina and Sapalua Islands)
- Aegus grandis Deyrolle, 1874 - Viti Levu and Vanua Levu Islands (Fiji)
- Aegus gressitti De Lisle, 1974 - Solomon Islands (Guadalcanal and Kolombangara Islands)
- Aegus helleri Nagel, 1928 - Malaysia (Selangor and Sarawak) and Indonesia (West Kalimantan)
- Aegus hikidai Araya, 1994 - Malaysia (Sarawak)
- Aegus horni Nagel, 1928 - Malaysia (Sarawak)
- Aegus hyperpunctatus Boucher, 1996 - Lau Islands (Fiji)
- Aegus implicatus Nagai in Mizunuma & Nagai, 1994 - Indonesia (North Sulawesi, Central Sulawesi and South Sulawesi)
- Aegus impressicollis Parry, 1864 - Malaysia (Pahang, Sarawak and Sabah), Indonesia (Sumatra? and West Kalimantan) and the Philippines (Palawan, Mindanao and Leyte Islands)
- Aegus ingae (may be a synonym of A. celebensis) Schenk, 2000 - Indonesia (Mamasa Regency on Sulawesi)
- Aegus insipidus (Possibly a subspecies of A. acuminatus) Thomson, 1862 - Indonesia (northern Sulawesi, Batandua and Tahuna Islands) and Papua New Guinea (Woodlark Island)?
- Aegus interruptus W.S. MacLeay, 1819 - India?
- Aegus isogaii Nagai in Mizunuma & Nagai, 1994 - Indonesia (Central Sulawesi)
- Aegus javanicus Oberthür & Houlbert, 1914 - Indonesia (West Java)
- Aegus jejunus De Lisle, 1977 - Papua New Guinea (Eastern Highlands)
- Aegus kandiensis (Possibly a subspecies of A. chelifer) Parry, 1864 - Sri Lanka
- Aegus kazuhisai Nagai in Mizunuma & Nagai, 1994 - Indonesia (West Sumatra and Siberut Island)
- Aegus kinabalensis Nagai in Mizunuma & Nagai, 1994 - Malaysia (Sabah)
- Aegus kirsteni Schenk, 2001 - Malaysia (Sabah)
- Aegus kombaensis Nagel, 1941 - Papua New Guinea
- Aegus kuantungensis Nagel, 1925
- Aegus kumei Ikeda, 1997 - southern Vietnam
- Aegus kurosawai Okajima & Ichikawa, 1986 - Taiwan
- Aegus laevicollis (Saunders, 1854) - China (Hunan, Anhui, Shanghai, Jiangxi, Guangdong, Zhejiang and Fujian), Taiwan, southern South Korea (including Jeju Island) and southern Japan (including Izu Islands and Amami Yoshima Island)
- Aegus laticollis Arrow, 1943 - Malaysia (Pahang and Sarawak) and Indonesia (West Kalimantan, West Sumatra, South Sumatra, Lampung and Siberut Island)
- Aegus latidens Schaufuss, 1864 - New Guinea?
- Aegus leeuweni Ritsema, 1882 - Indonesia (North Sumatra and West Sumatra)
- Aegus lucidus Bomans, 1993 - Borneo?
- Aegus maeandrinus Kriesche, 1920 - Papua New Guinea (East Sepik)
- Aegus malapaensis De Lisle, 1967 - Solomon Islands (Guadalcanal, Malapa and Santa Isabel Islands)
- Aegus malayanus Bomans, 1993 - Malay Peninsula?
- Aegus malleti Bomans, 1991 - Indonesia (Central Sulawesi)
- Aegus melli Nagel, 1925 - China (Guangdong and Fujian)
- Aegus milkintae Bomans, 1992 - Vietnam (Tonkin)
- Aegus minahasaensis Nagai in Mizunuma & Nagai, 1994 - Indonesia (North Sulawesi)
- Aegus misoolensis De Lisle, 1967 - Indonesia (Misool Island and West Papua?)
- Aegus modiglianii Bomans, 1992 - Indonesia (Sumatra?)
- Aegus nakaneorum Ichikawa & Fujita, 1986 - Taiwan (Nantou)
- Aegus nayani Schenk, 2008 - Malaysia (Sabah)
- Aegus nishikawai Nagai in Mizunuma & Nagai, 1994 - Yamdena Island (Indonesia)
- Aegus nishiyamai Nagai in Mizunuma & Nagai, 1994 - Sibuyan and Romblon (Philippines)
- Aegus nobuyukii Nagai in Mizunuma & Nagai, 1994 - Malaysia (Sabah)
- Aegus octagonicus Nagai in Mizunuma & Nagai, 1994 - Indonesia (North Sulawesi)
- Aegus oxygonus Jakowlew, 1897 - Malaysia (Sabah)
- Aegus parallelus (Hope & Westwood, 1845) - India (Assam and Meghalaya), Myanmar (Tenasserim), Thailand (Chiang Mai and Lampang), Malaysia (Kedah, Pahang, Johor and Sarawak) and Indonesia (West Kalimantan, Aceh, North Sumatra, West Sumatra, South Sumatra, West Java and Belitung and Nias Islands)
- Aegus parvus Boileau, 1902 - China (Sichuan)
- Aegus pengalenganus Van de Poll, 1895 - Indonesia (West Java)
- Aegus peterseni De Lisle, 1968 - New Ireland Island (Papua New Guinea)
- Aegus pichoni Didier, 1931 - China (Zhejiang)
- Aegus planeti Jakowlew, 1900 - Papua New Guinea (Mount Bosavi)
- Aegus planicollis Möllenkamp, 1911 - Malaysia (Sabah)
- Aegus platyodon Parry, 1862 - From Mindoro Island (Philippines) to Obilatu Island (Indonesia) and Ranongga Island (Solomon Islands) through the Moluccas, New Guinea, Bismarck Islands and D'Entrecasteaux Islands. If A. porrectodon and A. jansoni are included as subspecies The range extends to Queensland (Australia), Sumatra (Indonesia) and Borneo
- Aegus porrectodon (Possibly a subspecies of A. platyodon) Bomans, 1993 - Papua New Guinea (Sandaun)
- Aegus preangerensis (van der Poll, 1895) - Indonesia (West Java)
- Aegus puncakensis (Possibly a subspecies of A. punctithorax) Nagai in Mizunuma & Nagai, 1994 - Indonesia (Sarawak)
- Aegus punctatissimus Nagel, 1926 - Malaysia (Sarawak)
- Aegus punctipennis (Possibly a subspecies of A. platyodon) Parry, 1864 - Indonesia (West Kalimantan, East Kalimantan and North Sumatra) and Malaysia (Sarawak and Sabah)
- Aegus punctithorax Heller, 1900 - Indonesia (Central Sulawesi)
- Aegus punctulatus Bomans, 1993 - northern Vietnam and Laos
- Aegus rennellensis De Lisle, 1968 - Rennel Island (Solomon Islands)
- Aegus retrodentatus De Lisle, 1967 - Papua New Guinea (Morobe? and Oro?)
- Aegus riedeli Bartolozzi, 1996 - Indonesia (West Papua)
- Aegus rigouti Nagai in Mizunuma & Nagai, 1994 - Malaysia (Sabah)
- Aegus ritae Bomans & Ipsen, 1993 - Indonesia (North Sulawesi)
- Aegus rondoni Bomans, 1971 - Vietnam, Laos and Thailand
- Aegus rosselianus Boileau, 1902 - Papua New Guinea (Misima and Rossel Islands)
- Aegus rostratus Didier, 1928 - Vietnam (Tonkin)
- Aegus rubratus Didier, 1928 - no localities known
- Aegus schenklingi Möllenkamp, 1909 - Indonesia (Aceh, North Sumatra and West Sumatra)
- Aegus sculpticollis Heller, 1900 - Indonesia (North Sulawesi)
- Aegus sedlacekorum De Lisle, 1974 - Solomon Islands (Kolombangara, Gizo, New Georgia and Vella Lavella Islands)
- Aegus selene (Possibly a synonym of A. sulcaticollis) De Lisle, 1967 - Philippines (Luzon, Negros, Mindanao and Mindoro)
- Aegus semicircularis Schaufuss, 1887 - Indonesia (South Sulawesi)
- Aegus serratus Parry, 1864 - Indonesia (Ambon, Halmahera, Mandioli, Morty, Morotai and Obi Islands)
- Aegus siamensis Kriesche, 1922 - Thailand?
- Aegus splendidus Nagel, 1928 - Indonesia? (Sumatra? and Borneo?)
- Aegus storki Nagai, 1994 - Malaysia (Pahang)
- Aegus subniger Didier, 1928 - Borneo?
- Aegus sulcaticollis Heller, 1927 - Samar Island (Philippines)
- Aegus sumatraensis Bomans, 1992 - Indonesia (West Sumatra)
- Aegus suzumurai Nagai, 1994 - Malaysia (Pahang)
- Aegus tagulaensis Bomans, 1993 - Tagula Island (Papua New Guinea)
- Aegus taurus (Possibly placed in a wrong subgenus) Boileau, 1899 - northern Vietnam and China (Yunnan, Hainan, Guangxi)
- Aegus tetsuoi Nagai in Mizunuma & Nagai, 1994 - Malaysia (Sarawak)
- Aegus werneri Nagai in Mizunuma & Nagai, 1994 - Vietnam (Sapa) and China (Yunnan)

=== Subgenus Cherasphorus Bomans, 1988 ===
- Aegus inflatus (Bomans, 1988) - Papua New Guinea (Eastern Highlands)
- Aegus suzukii (Doubtful) (Fujita, 2010) - New Guinea?

==== Subgenus Elsion Kriesche, 1921 ====
- Aegus sepicanum Kriesche, 1920 - Papua New Guinea

==== Subgenus Eubussea Zacher, 1913 ====
- Aegus alternatus (Fairmaire, 1881) - Pohnpei Island (Micronesia)
- Aegus barbatus (may be a synonym of A. bougainvillensis) Nagel, 1928 - Bougainville Island
- Aegus bougainvillensis (could be a synonym of A. barbatus) (Nagel, 1941) - Bougainville Island
- Aegus caledoniae Boucher, 1991 - New Caledonia
- Aegus dilatatus (Fairmaire, 1849) - Muyua Island (Papua New Guinea)
- Aegus hindenburgi (Kriesche, 1920) - Upolu Island (Samoa)
- Aegus tutuilensis Arrow, 1927 - Tutuila Island (American Samoa)
- Aegus upoluensis (Arrow, 1927) - Upolu Island (Samoa) and Wallis Island
- Aegus woodfordi Waterhouse, 1890 - Solomon Islands (Florida Islands and Alu, Bougainville, Guadalcanal, Malaita, Ranongga and Kolombangara Islands)

==== Subgenus Gnaphaegus Maes, 1992 ====
- Aegus albertisi Bomans, 1992 - Papua New Guinea
- Aegus borneensis (Nagel, 1926) - Malaysia (Sarawak)
- Aegus capreolus (Boileau, 1903) - Malaysia (Sabah), Indonesia (West Kalimantan and West Sumatra) and the Philippines (Palawan)
- Aegus dilaticollis (Parry, 1864) - Malaysia (Pahang and Sabah) and Indonesia (South Sumatra)
- Aegus furfuraceus De Lisle, 1970 - Indonesia (West Papua)
- Aegus haddeni (Benesh, 1950) - Philippines (Luzon, Negros and Mindanao Islands)
- Aegus horridus Benesh, 1950 - Philippines (Luzon and Mindanao)
- Aegus krieschei (Nagel, 1928) - Malaysia (Sarawak)
- Aegus miles (Snellen van Vollenhoven, 1865) - Indonesia (Halmahera, Ternate, Bachan, Batandua, Mayu, Gebe and Gebeh Islands, Central Sulawesi) and Papua New Guinea?
- Aegus notarii (Lacroix, 1986) - Indonesia (Flores, Sumbawa and Timor Islands, South Sulawesi)
- Aegus perforatus (Ritsema, 1885)- Malaysia (Kedah, Sarawak and Sabah) and Indonesia (West Kalimantan). May also be present on Sulawesi?
- Aegus pulverosus Benesh, 1952 - Bougainville Island
- Aegus sculptipennis (Parry, 1864) - New Guinea Highlands?
- Aegus squalidus (Hope & Westwood, 1845) - Borneo?, Malaysia (Perak and Pahang), Indonesia (Sumatra)

==== Subgenus Micraegus Maes, 1992 ====
- Aegus adelphus Thomson, 1862 - Malaysia (Malacca, Pahang, Johor and Sabah) and Indonesia (souwestern Borneo?)
- Aegus amictus Deyrolle, 1865 - Malaysia (Malacca, Pahang and Sarawak). It may also be present on Sumatra
- Aegus arcuatus Bomans, 1991 - Malaysia (Sabah)
- Aegus arnaudi Bomans & Bartolozzi, 1993 - Philippines (Palawan and Mindanao)
- Aegus babai Nagai, 1994 - Myanmar (Karen and Tenasserim)
- Aegus brevimandibularis (Nagai, 1994) - Malaysia (Sabah)
- Aegus comes (May be placed in another genus) De Lisle, 1967 - New Guinea?
- Aegus consimilis Nagel, 1941 - Malaysia (Sarawak and Sabah)
- Aegus elegantulus Van Roon, 1907 - Papua New Guinea (Eastern Highlands, Morobe and New Britain

Island)

- Aegus eximius Nagel, 1933 - Malaysia (Sarawak and Sabah)
- Aegus falcicornis Nagai, 1994 - Malaysia (Sarawak, Sabah)
- Aegus formosulus Didier, 1928 - Borneo?
- Aegus fragilis Didier, 1928 - Yapen

Island (Indonesia)

- Aegus genacerus Bomans, 1984 - Papua New Guinea (Western Highlands, Eastern Highlands and Madang)
- Aegus gestroi Boileau, 1902 - Indonesia (West Kalimantan)
- Aegus glaber Parry, 1864 - Indonesia (Papua, West Papua and Obi Island)
- Aegus gracillimus Didier, 1928 - no localities known
- Aegus hamatus Jakowleff, 1900 - Malaysia (Sarawak and Sabah) and Indonesia (Jambi)
- Aegus hopei Boileau, 1901 - Indonesia (West Sumatra and South Sumatra)
- Aegus insignis Nagel, 1941 - Malaysia (Pahang)
- Aegus ipseni Bomans, 1993 - Brunei and Indonesia (East Kalimantan and South Kalimantan)
- Aegus krikkeni Nagai, 1994 - Malaysia (Sarawak)
- Aegus lachaumei Nagai, 1994 - Malaysia (Sabah)
- Aegus legrandi Nagai, 1994 - Indonesia (West Sumatra)
- Aegus longiusculus Nagai, 1994 - Malaysia (Sabah)
- Aegus lunatus (Weber, 1891) - Indonesia (Aceh, West Sumatra, South Sumatra and West Kalimantan/Borneo) and Malaysia (Sarawak)
- Aegus luridus Didier, 1928 - New Guinea?
- Aegus minutus (Gestro, 1881) - Indonesia (Papua and Japen Island)
- Aegus mizukamii Nagai, 1994 - Malaysia (Sarawak) and Indonesia (West Kalimantan)
- Aegus myrmidon Thomson, 1856 - Malaysia (Perak) and Indonesia (West Kalimantan, South Kalimantan, North Sumatra and West Sumatra)
- Aegus parryi Waterhouse, 1890 - Malaysia (Sarawak). It may also be present Sumatra
- Aegus payakumbuhensis Nagai, 1994 - Indonesia (West Sumatra,
- Aegus porrectus Nagel, 1933 - Indonesia (West Kalimantan) and Malaysia (Sarawak). It may also be present on Sulawesi
- Aegus pusillus Gestro, 1881 - Indonesia (Papua and Obi Island)
- Aegus ritsemae Boileau, 1899 - northern Vietnam?, Malaysia?. It may also be present on Borneo
- Aegus sabanus Nagai, 1994 - Malaysia (Sabah)
- Aegus sakaii Nagai, 1994 - Malaysia (Sabah)
- Aegus sarawakensis Nagai, 1994 - Malaysia (Sarawak)
- Aegus satoi Nagai, 1994 - Malaysia (Sabah)
- Aegus sexlineatus Nagel, 1928 - Malaysia (Sarawak) and Indonesia (West Kalimantan)
- Aegus westwoodi Boileau, 1899 - Malaysia?

==== Subgenus Paraegus Gahan, 1889 ====
- Aegus lansbergei Boileau, 1902 - Indonesia (Flores, Adonara, Lembata and Timor Islands)
- Aegus listeri (Gahan, 1888) - Christmas Island
- Aegus nar (Kriesche, 1920) - Indonesia (Papua)
- Aegus szentivanyi De Lisle, 1967 - Papua New Guinea (Morobe and Eastern Highlands)

==== Subgenus Pseudaegus Heller, 1900 ====
- Aegus leptodon (Heller, 1900) - Sulawesi? (Indonesia)

==== Subgenus Torynognathus Arrow, 1935 ====
- Aegus chrysomelinus (Bomans, 1986) - Malaysia (Selangor)
- Aegus marginatus (Arrow, 1935) - Borneo?
- Aegus marginivillosus De Lisle, 1967 - Indonesia (Papua)
- Aegus oberthuri (Arrow, 1935) - Indonesia (North Sumatra)

==== Subgenus Tumidaegus Bomans, 1988 ====
- Aegus variolosus (Bomans, 1988) - Papua (Eastern Highlands)

==== Incertae sedis ====
- Aegus acchusi Sakamaki, 2006 - Indonesia (South Sulawesi)
- Aegus augustanus (sometimes referred to as angustanus) Kriesche, 1920 - Papua New Guinea (Etappengerg, Morobe)
- Aegus bakrii Okuda, 2012 - Indonesia (South Sulawesi? and Central Sulawesi?)
- Aegus baumanni Schenk, 2003 - Malaysia (Sabah)
- Aegus buergersi Kriesche, 1920 - Papua New Guinea
- Aegus dusunorum H. Ikeda, 2003
- Aegus imitator Nagel, 1941 - China (Yunnan and Sichuan)
- Aegus inaharai Fujita, 2010
- Aegus ishigakiensis Nomura, 1960
- Aegus jansoni (Possibly a subspecies of A. platyodon) Boileau, 1905 - Australia (Queensland)
- Aegus jengi Huang & Chen, 2016
- Aegus kobayashii Fujita, 2010
- Aegus kuangtungensis Nagel, 1925 - China (Zhejiang, Hunan, Fujian, Guangdong and Guangxi
- Aegus labilis Westwood, 1864 - Bhutan, northeastern India and China (Xizang)
- Aegus lesacae Fujita, 2010
- Aegus linealis Didier, 1931 - From southeastern Tibet (China) and Sikkim (India) to Chiang Rai (Thailand)
- Aegus lwini Nagai & Maeda, 2009
- Aegus macroparvus Nagel, 1941
- Aegus masahikoi (Possibly a synonym) Nagai, 2000 - Indonesia (South Sulawesi)?
- Aegus miyashitai Fujita, 2010
- Aegus monodentatus (Doubtfull) Bomans & Ipsen, 1993 - Indonesia?
- Aegus montrouzieri (Maes, 1981)
- Aegus nakanei Ichikawa & Imanishi, 1976
- Aegus naungi Nagai & Maeda, 2009
- Aegus occidentalis Pathomwattananurak & Jiaranaisakul, 2024 - Thailand (Tenasserim Range)
- Aegus ogasawarensis Okajima & Kobayashi, 1975
- Aegus pavus Boileau, 1902 - China (Jiangsu)
- Aegus pygmaeus (Possibly a synonym of A. adelphus) Jakowlew, 1902 - Malaysia (Sabah)
- Aegus ramlii Okuda, 2015 - Indonesia (Peleng Island)
- Aegus rhomboidodon Araya & Fujita, 2015
- Aegus robustus Yamamoto & Pham, 2025 - Vietnam (Ha Giang and Yen Bai)
- Aegus rufurus (Possibly a synonym) Didier, 1928 - Papua New Guinea (Central Province and East Sepik?)
- Aegus rungusiorum H. Ikeda, 2000
- Aegus sakamakii Fujita, 2010
- Aegus shinjii Fujita, 2010
- Aegus subnitidus Waterhouse, 1872
- Aegus svenjae Schenk, 2004 - Indonesia (South Sulawesi)
- Aegus syamsuli H. Ikeda & Sakamaki, 2002
- Aegus takakuwai Fujita, 2010
- Aegus takayukii Okuda, 2012
- Aegus variegarus Didier & Sguy, 1953 -
- Aegus yangqiaozhii Huang & Chen, 2023 - China (Yunnan)
- Aegus zhouzii Huang & Chen, 2023 - China (Zhejiang, Hunan, Fujian, Guangxi and Chongqing) and Vietnam (Tonkin)
