= BIQ =

BIQ or biq may refer to:

- BIQ, the IATA code for Biarritz Pays Basque Airport, French Basque Country
- biq, the ISO 639-3 code for Bipi language, Papua New Guinea
