= Maximilian Franz Thiel =

German trading agent

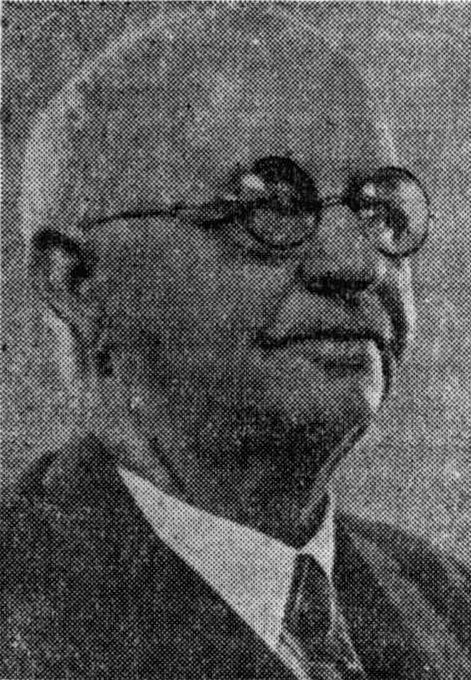
- Thiel in 1935
- Born: 12 January 1865
- Died: 16 May 1939 (aged 74)

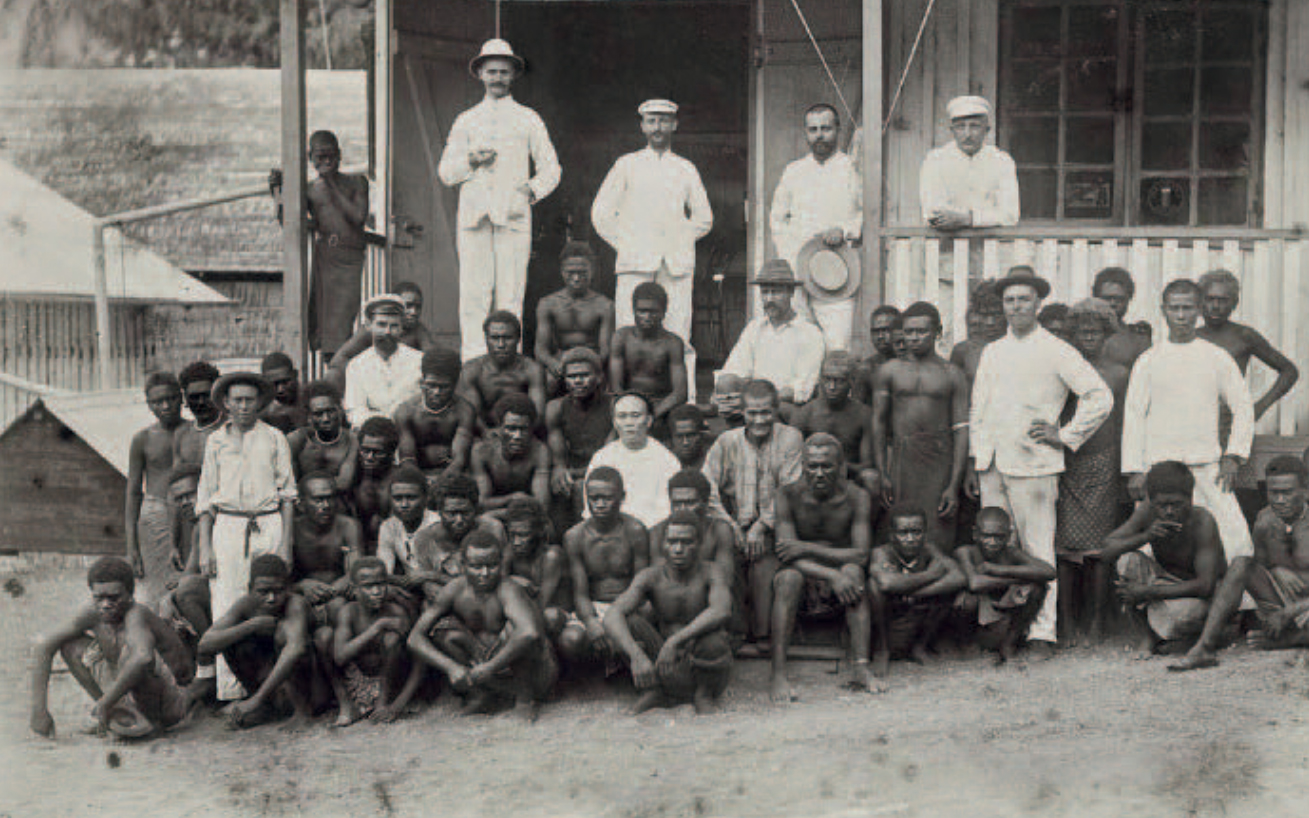
Employees of the Hamburg trading company Hernsheim & Co. on Matupi, New Britain, c 1890. Managing director Max Thiel stands on the veranda holding his hat in one hand.

Maximilian Franz Thiel, often just called Max Thiel, (12 January 1865 –16 May 1939) was a German agent who worked for Hernsheim & Co in German New Guinea. He was manager of the Pacific operations of the German enterprise. His mother Rosetta Albertina was sister to Eduard and Franz Hernsheim, the founders of Hernsheim & Co. In at least 1884 he was living on Jaluit, Marshall Islands, at the same time as Franz Hernsheim. The year after he got to German New Guinea where he lived in Matupi in Rabaul, Niu Briten (New Britain), Bismarck Archipelago where also Eduard Hernsheim lived. Here he was manager as well as part-time owner of Hernsheim & Co. During this time he was also Norwegian consul in German New Guinea.

== Ethnographic collections ==
An important business for him and Hernsheim & Co was ethnographic collections. He soon realised that there was much money in those collections and they were easy to sell to various travellers in the region. He stockpiled such collections at his house on Matupi but they were often poorly labeled and lacked proper categorisation, place of origin, natives name etc. In 1902 Thiel hired Franz Hellwig, a former employee of the Deutsche Handels- und Plantagengesellschaft to assist him in his collecting. Hellwig had lived a long time in the region and had accumulated a large collection that was for sale.

There are collections from Thiel in many museums in Europe and the United States.
