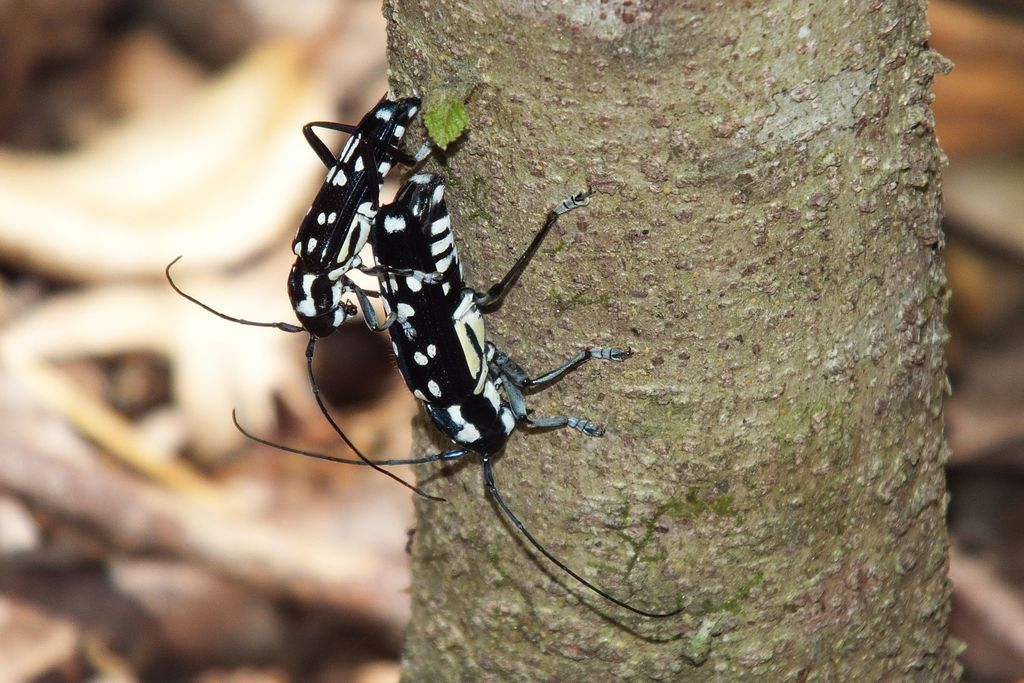
- Glenea venus finschi

Scientific classification
- Kingdom: Animalia
- Phylum: Arthropoda
- Clade: Pancrustacea
- Class: Insecta
- Order: Coleoptera
- Suborder: Polyphaga
- Infraorder: Cucujiformia
- Family: Cerambycidae
- Genus: Glenea
- Species: G. venus

Binomial name
- Glenea venus Thomson, 1865

Synonyms
- Glenea spinifera (Voet, 1804-1806); Glenea voeti Vives, 2013; Cerambyx spinifer Voet, 1804-1806

= Glenea venus =

Species of beetle

Glenea venus is a species of beetle in the family Cerambycidae. It was described by James Thomson in 1865. It is known from Papua New Guinea, Australia and Indonesia.

== Subspecies ==
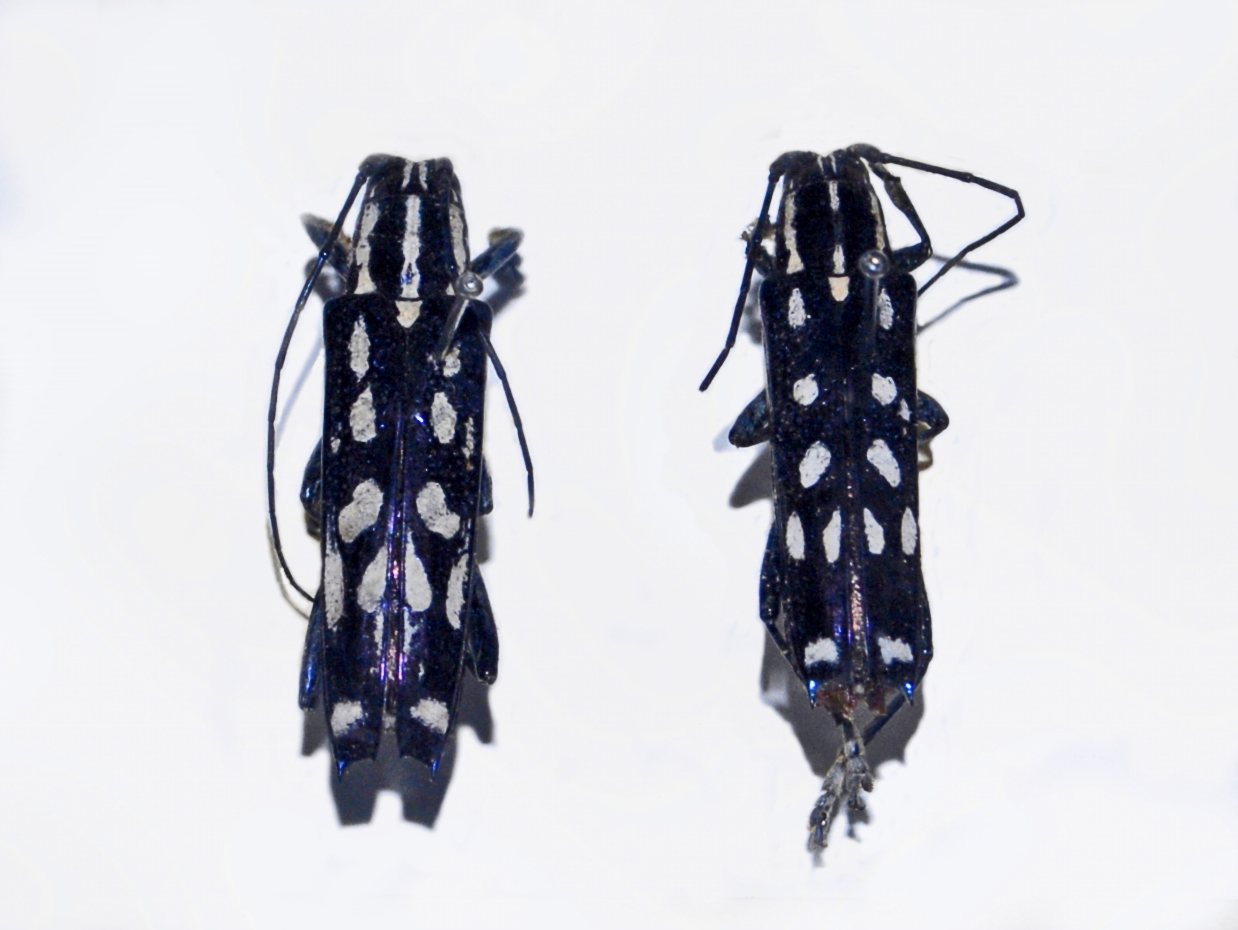
Glenea venus venus Mounted specimens

- Glenea venus bilitonensis Breuning, 1956 (Biliton)
- Glenea venus celebensis Ritsema, 1892 (Sulawesi)
- Glenea venus finschi Kuntzen, 1914 (Papua New Guinea, Australia)
- Glenea venus heinrothi Kuntzen, 1914 (Duke of York Islands, Woodlark Island, New Britain)
- Glenea venus venus Thomson, 1865 (West Papua, Moluccas)
