= Pak Island =

Island of Papua New Guinea

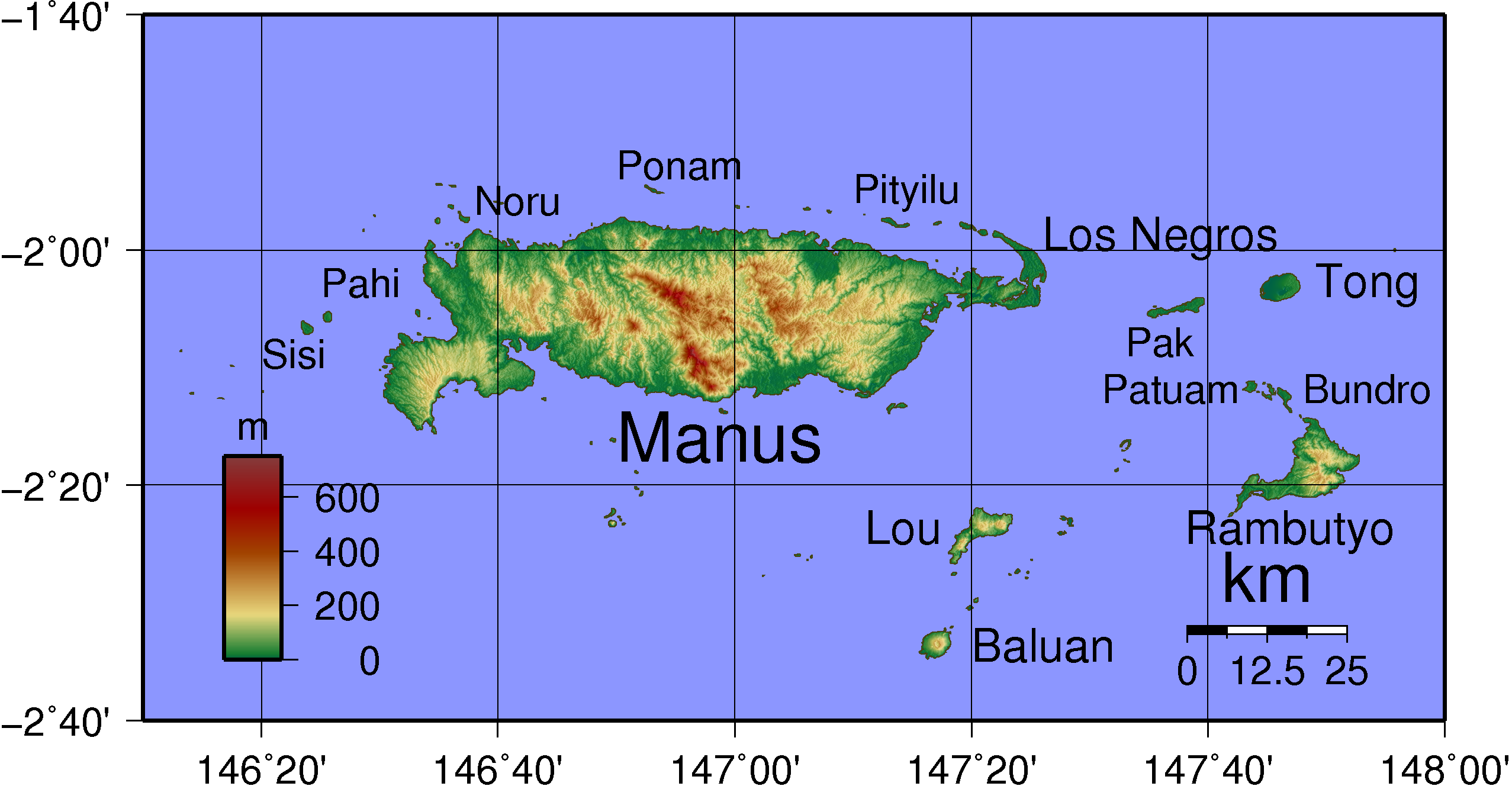
- Map of Admiralty Islands showing Pak Island

- Location within Papua New Guinea

Geography
- Location: Oceania
- Coordinates: 2°05′S 147°38′E
- Archipelago: Admiralty Islands, Bismarck Archipelago

Administration
- Papua New Guinea
- Province: Manus Province

Pak Island is an island of Papua New Guinea. It is in the Admiralty Islands group of the Bismarck Archipelago.
