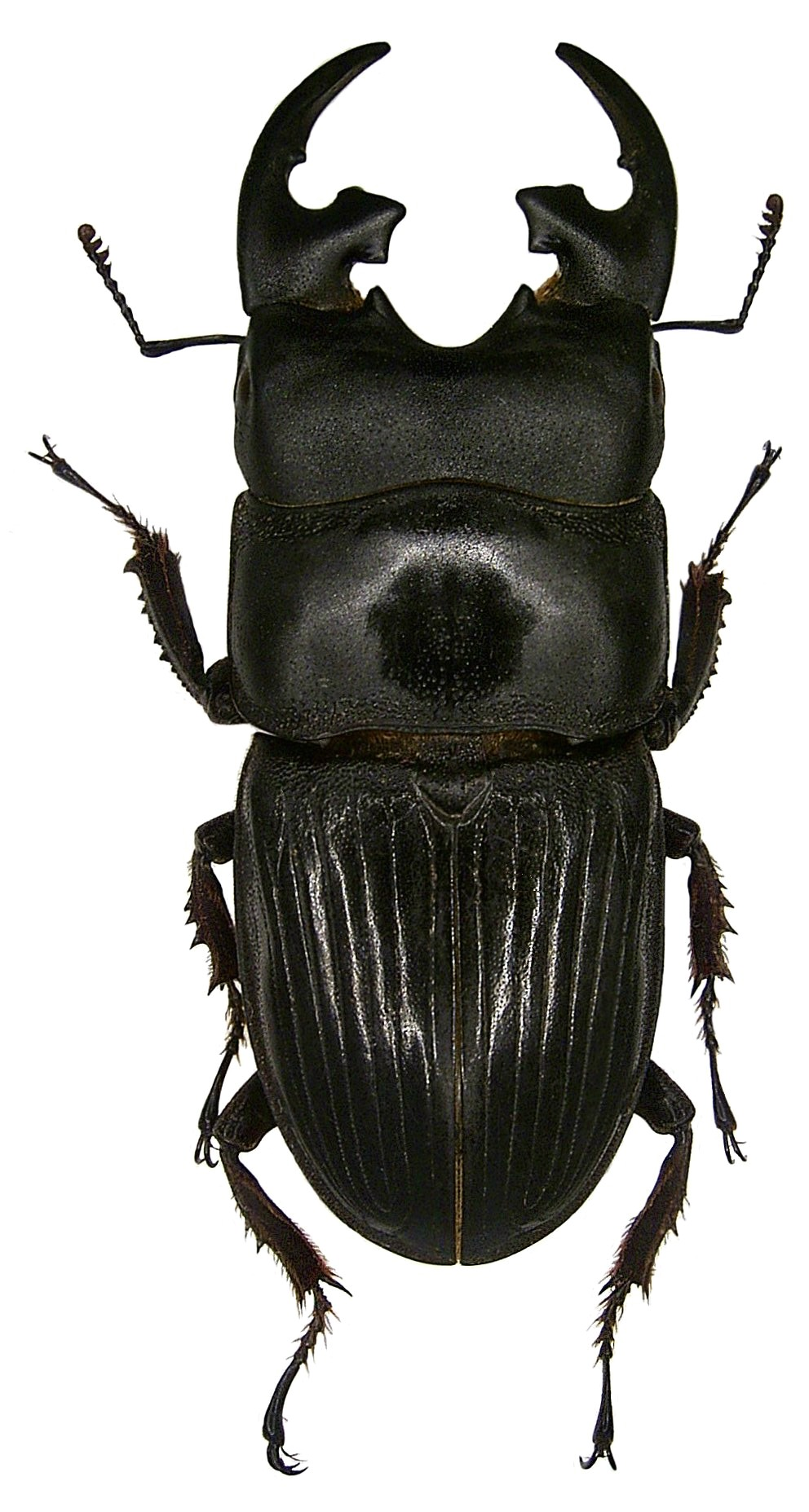

Scientific classification
- Kingdom: Animalia
- Phylum: Arthropoda
- Class: Insecta
- Order: Coleoptera
- Suborder: Polyphaga
- Infraorder: Scarabaeiformia
- Family: Lucanidae
- Genus: Aegus
- Species: A. platyodon

Binomial name
- Aegus platyodon Parry, 1862

= Aegus platyodon =

Species of beetle

Aegus platyodon is a species of stag beetle in the genus Aegus.

There are currently ten accepted subspecies:

- Aegus platyodon bellus Möllenkamp, 1902
- Aegus platyodon foraminatus Bomans, 1993
- Aegus platyodon insolitus Jakovlev, 1897
- Aegus platyodon lacroixi Bomans, 1993
- Aegus platyodon leopoldi Didier, 1932
- Aegus platyodon loeblei Nagai, 1994
- Aegus platyodon meeki Didier, 1928
- Aegus platyodon montanus Möllenkamp, 1911
- Aegus platyodon platyodon Parry, 1862
- Aegus platyodon porrectodon Bomans, 1993
