= Kabakon =

Island in Papua New Guinea

- Duke of York Islands

- Location within Papua New Guinea

Geography
- Location: Oceania
- Coordinates: 4°14′13.2″S 152°23′49.2″E
- Archipelago: Duke of York Islands
- Total islands: 13
- Major islands: Duke of York Island, Papua New Guinea
- Area: 3.6 km^{2} (1.4 sq mi)
- Highest point: 122

Administration
- Papua New Guinea

Kabakon or Kaka Kon Island is a small island in group of Duke of York Islands in the Bismarck Archipelago, Papua New Guinea. August Engelhardt chose Kabakon as the island to establish his Sun-worshipping sect, notable for only eating coconuts, from 1902 until his death.
