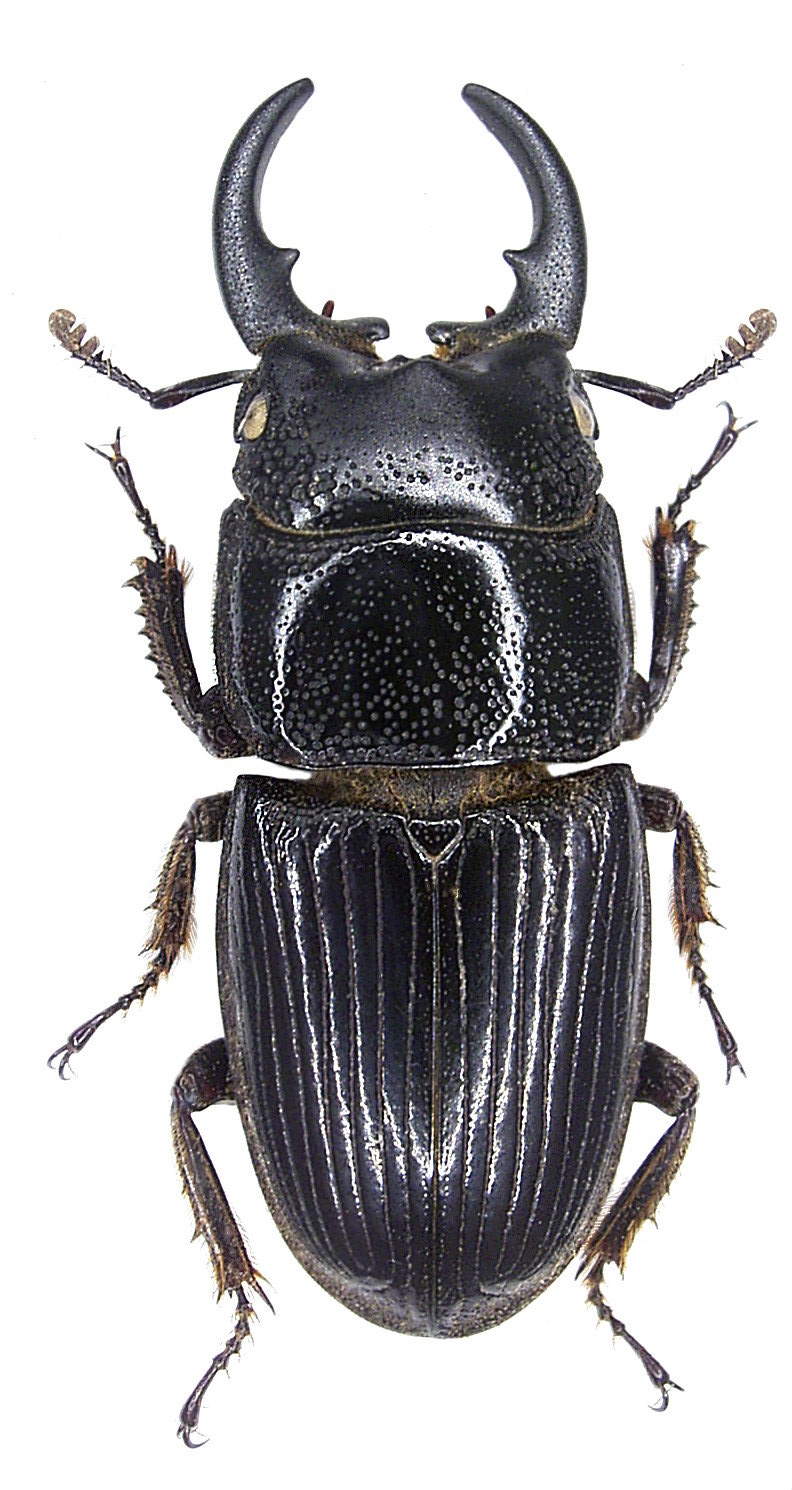
- A. c. chelifer male
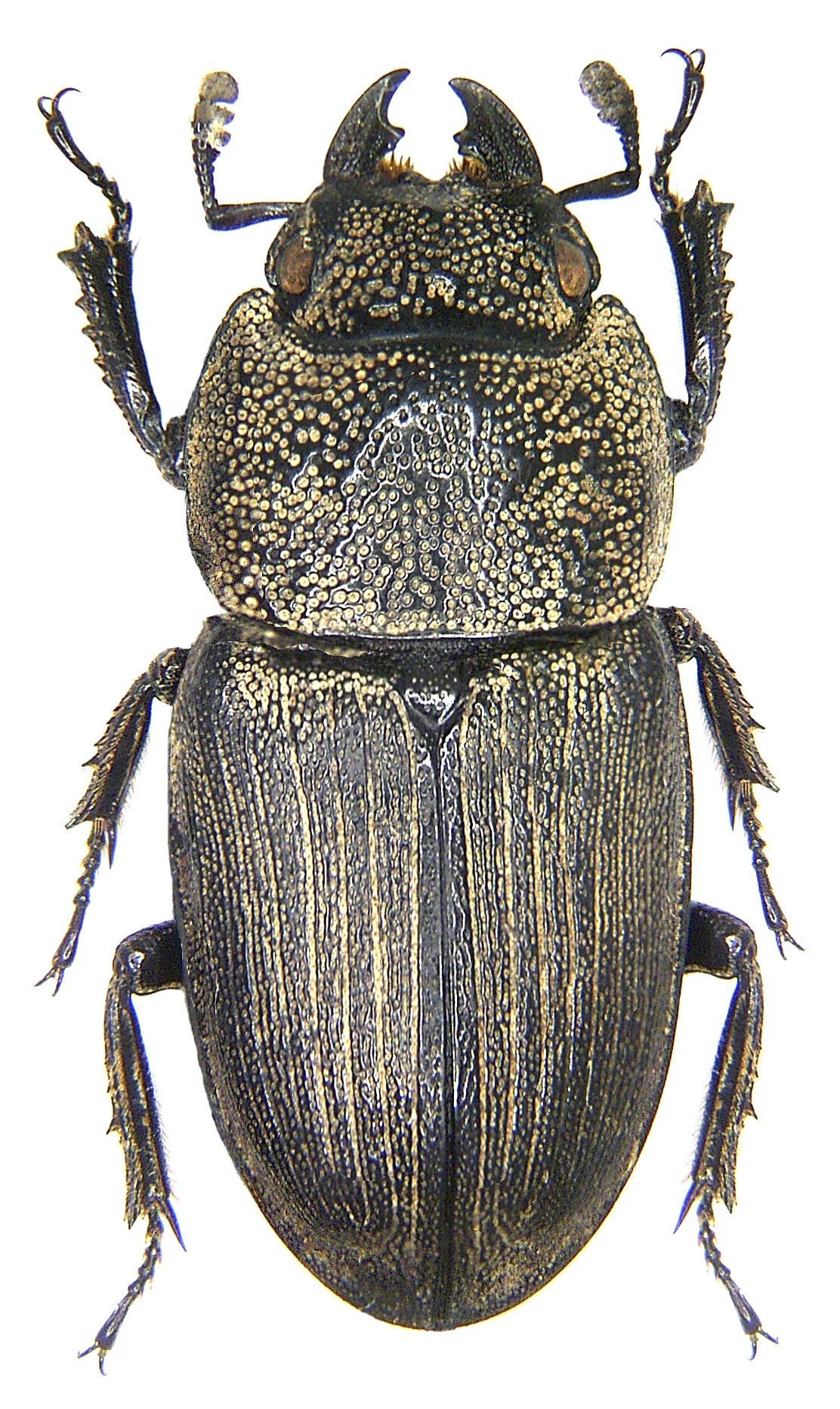
- A. c. chelifer female

Scientific classification
- Kingdom: Animalia
- Phylum: Arthropoda
- Class: Insecta
- Order: Coleoptera
- Suborder: Polyphaga
- Infraorder: Scarabaeiformia
- Family: Lucanidae
- Genus: Aegus
- Species: A. chelifer

Binomial name
- Aegus chelifer Macleay, 1819

Synonyms
- Aegus specularis Jakovlev, 1900

= Aegus chelifer =

Species of beetle

Aegus chelifer, is a species of stag beetle found in Indo-Malaya regional countries.

== Distribution ==
It is a widespread species of stag beetles found extensively throughout Indo-Malayan regions, west of Wallace's line, including: India, Bangladesh, Sri Lanka, Andaman and Nicobar islands, Myanmar, Thailand, Singapore, Laos, Vietnam, Cambodia, Malayan peninsula, Sumatra and Borneo. However, the species was recently found from Seychelles and Madagascar as an introduced species. The major cause for this is the dispersal event of large number of floating tree trunks from coastal forests of South East Asia which were carried westward by the South Equatorial Current during 2004 Indian Ocean earthquake and tsunami.

== Description ==
Body length is about 15.0 to 39.5 mm. This species shows great intraspecific variation in their body sizes. Males can be divided into two morphs based on their mandible size as minor and major morphs.

== Biology ==
A saproxylic species, adults and grubs are generally found in deadwood of broadleaf trees, under bark or fallen tree trunks, in forest patches near human settlements and firewood heaps. Male stag beetles usually involve aggressive behavior using their long mandibles to compete with rival males over females. Grubs are almost found within decaying wood or other decomposing substrates, where they feed on materials rich in fungal growth.

== Subspecies ==
Six subspecies have been identified.

- Aegus chelifer chelifer Macleay, 1819
- Aegus chelifer crassodontus Bomans, 1992
- Aegus chelifer kandiensis (Hope & Westwood, 1845)
- Aegus chelifer nitidus Boileau, 1899
- Aegus chelifer roepstorffi Waterhouse, 1890
- Aegus chelifer tonkinensis Kriesche, 1920

== Gallery ==
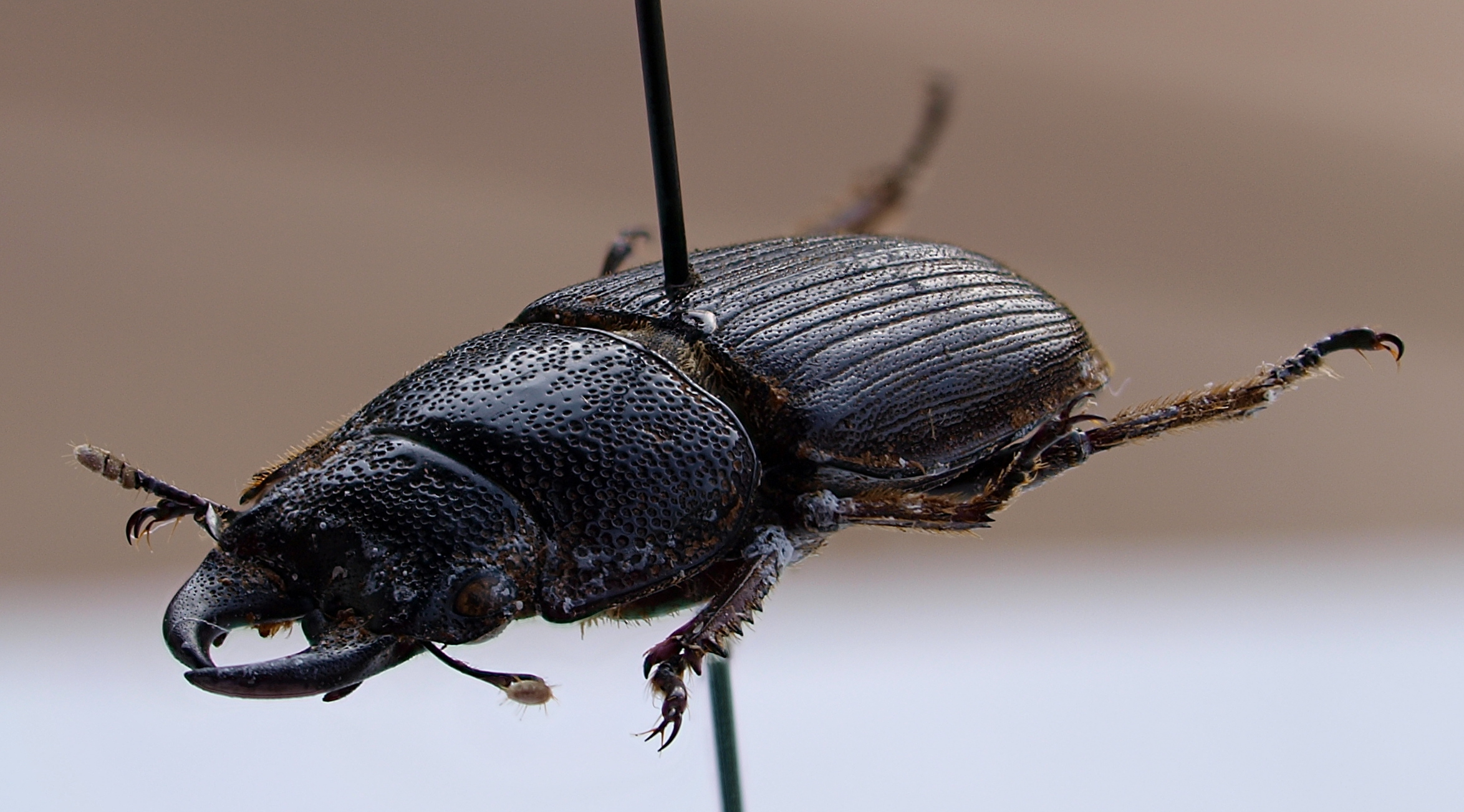
male

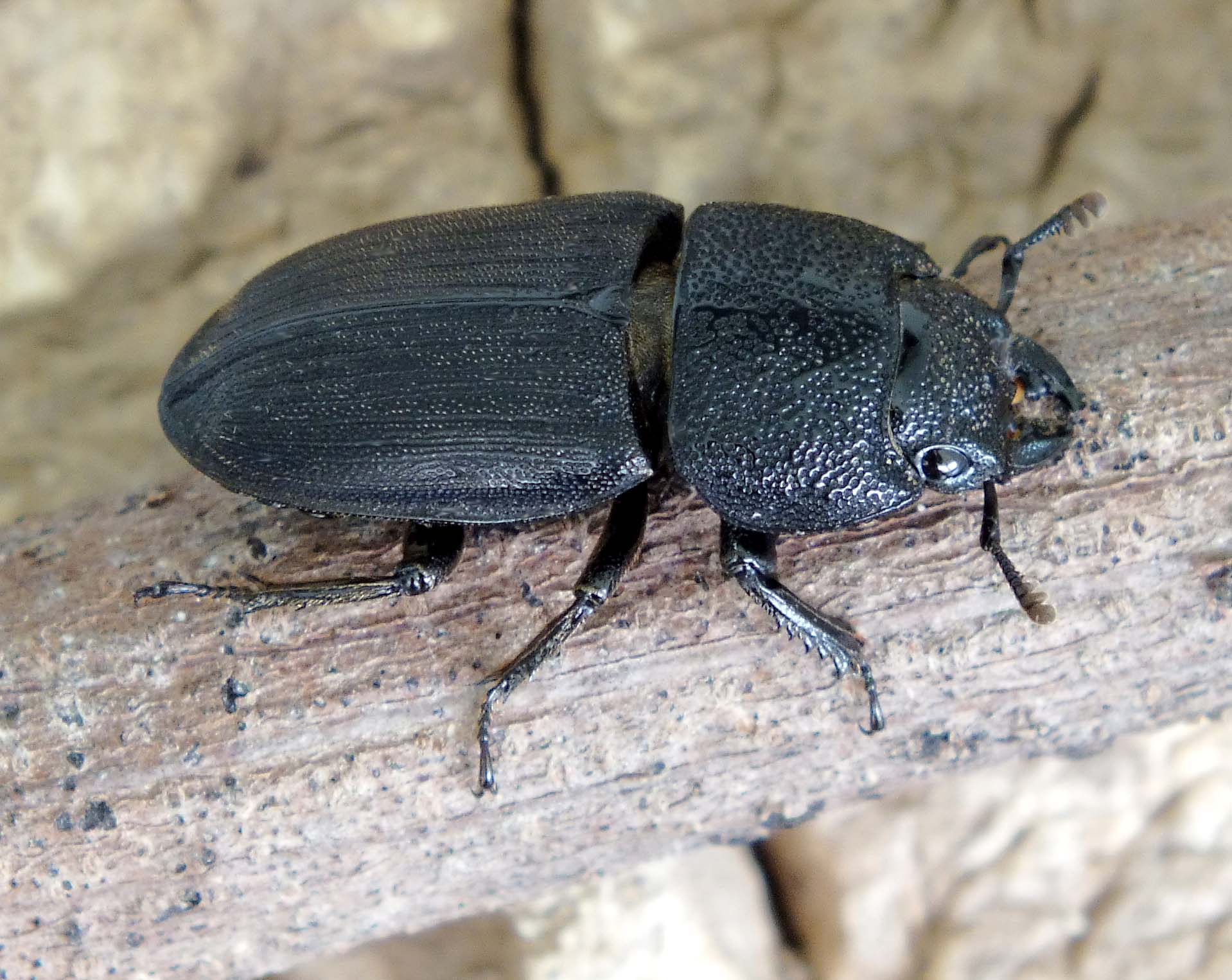
female
