= Bipi Island =

Island in Papua New Guinea

Coordinates: 2°6′00″S 146°25′00″E

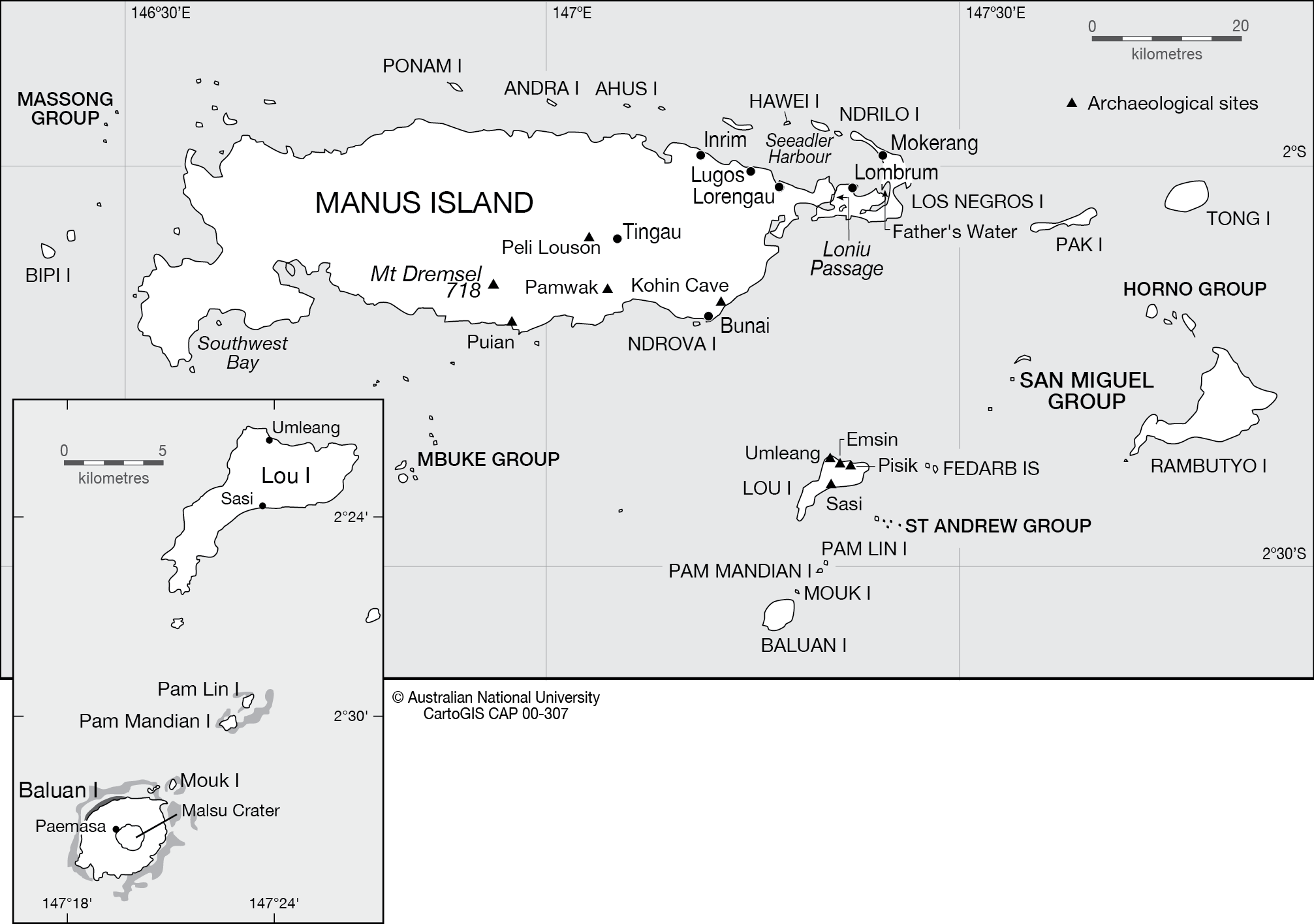
Bipi Island is to the west of Manus Island

Bipi Island is a flat coral island located off the west coast of the main island of Manus in the Admiralty Group, Papua New Guinea. Adjacent and to the North East of Bipi Island is Sisi Island. Bipi Island consists of three villages, namely Masoh, Matahai, and Kum (the latter is also known as "Salapai") with approximately one thousand inhabitants.

The name "Bipi Island" was most likely derived from the "Burns Philp" (BP) corporation's plantation colony on the island.

Bipi men were known as master woodcarvers in the 1970s and 1980s and sold carvings to supplement their meagre incomes made from copra production. Today, the main economic activity is fishing and the sale of bêche-de-mer to licensed buyers supplying the Asian markets. This activity is conducted on the surrounding coral islands and reefs which are owned by traditional islands, reefs and sea-owning groups of Bipi Island.

Bipi Island has one primary school that also caters to the students of nearby islands.

== See also ==
- Bipi language
