= Mualim Island =

Island in Papua New Guinea

Mualim
- Duke of York Islands

- Location within Papua New Guinea

Geography
- Location: Oceania
- Coordinates: 4°13′00″S 152°28′00″E
- Archipelago: Duke of York Islands
- Total islands: 13
- Major islands: Duke of York Island, Papua New Guinea

Administration
- Papua New Guinea

Mualim is an island in Duke of York Islands archipelago in Papua New Guinea. It is located in the east of the country, in the East New Britain Province, about 800 km (500 mi) to the east of the Port Moresby. Due to rising sea levels limiting land on the island, residents reportedly travel to other islands for food, firewood and water.
