= Makada =

Island in Papua New Guinea

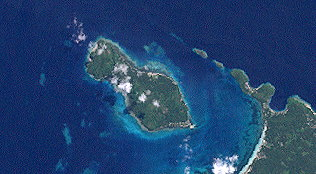
- Makada island in the Duke of York Islands group. NASA Landsat 7 image, 2000.

- Location within Papua New Guinea

Geography
- Location: Oceania
- Coordinates: 4°07′S 152°25′E
- Archipelago: Duke of York Islands
- Total islands: 13
- Major islands: Duke of York Island, Papua New Guinea
- Area: 3.6 km^{2} (1.4 sq mi)
- Highest point: 122

Administration
- Papua New Guinea

Makada is an island in the Duke of York Islands archipelago in Papua New Guinea. It is located in the east of the country, in the East New Britain Province, about 800 km to the east of the Port Moresby.

== Geography ==
The Makada Island has a flat surface. The highest point on the island is 122 meters (400 ft) above sea level. It covers about 2.7 km (1.7 mi) from the north to the south and 3.0 km (1.9 mi) from the east to the west. Its total area is about 3.6 square kilometers (1.4 sq mi).
