= Duke of York Rural LLG =

Local-level government in Papua New Guinea

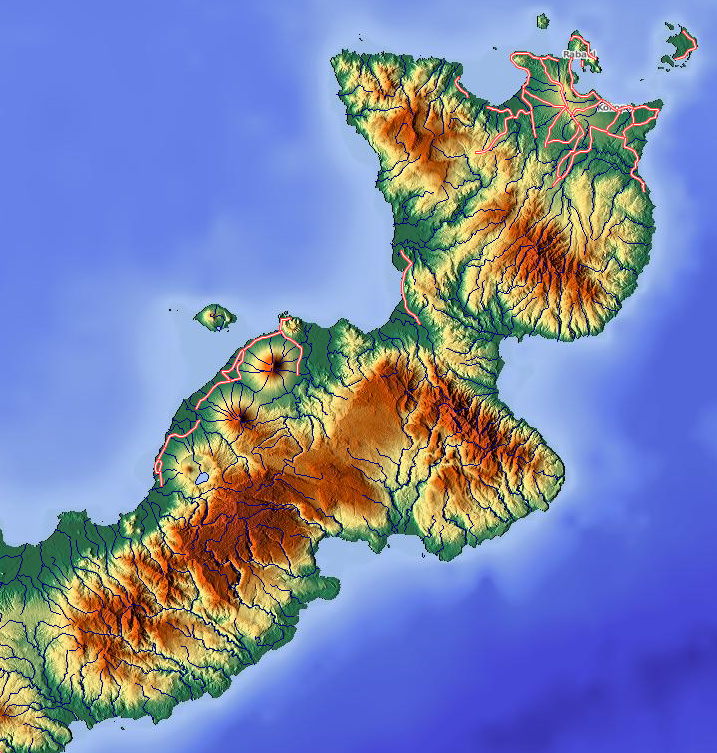
- Location within Papua New Guinea
- Coordinates: 4.200435°S 152.476896°E
- Country: Papua New Guinea
- Province: East New Britain Province
- Time zone: UTC+10 (AEST)

Duke of York Rural LLG is a local-level government (LLG) that comprises the Duke of York Islands in East New Britain Province, Papua New Guinea.

== Wards ==
- 01. Makada/Nagaila
- 02. Molot
- 03. Maren
- 04. Butlivuan
- 05. Waira
- 06. Nabual
- 07. Inolo
- 08. Kumaina
- 09. Kabilomo
- 10. Urakukur
- 11. Kababiai
- 12. Mualim
- 13. Virian
- 14. Palpal
- 15. Utuan
- 16. Karawara
- 17. Mioko
- 18. Urukuk
- 19. Pirtop
- 20. Nakukur No.1 & 2
- 21. Rakanda
