= Rambutyo Island =

Island in Papua New Guinea

Coordinates: 2°18′S 147°49′E

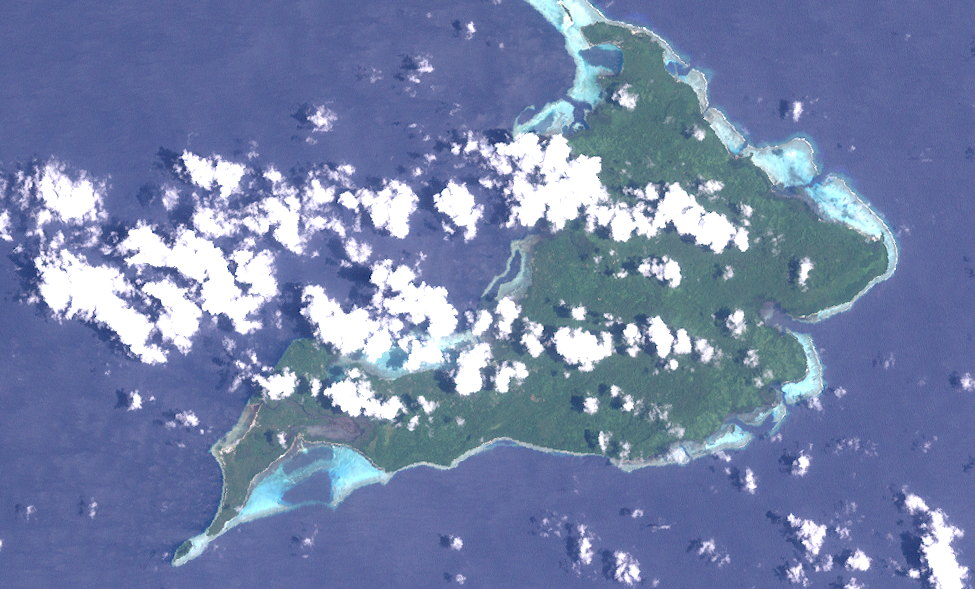
Rambutyo Island Landsat image

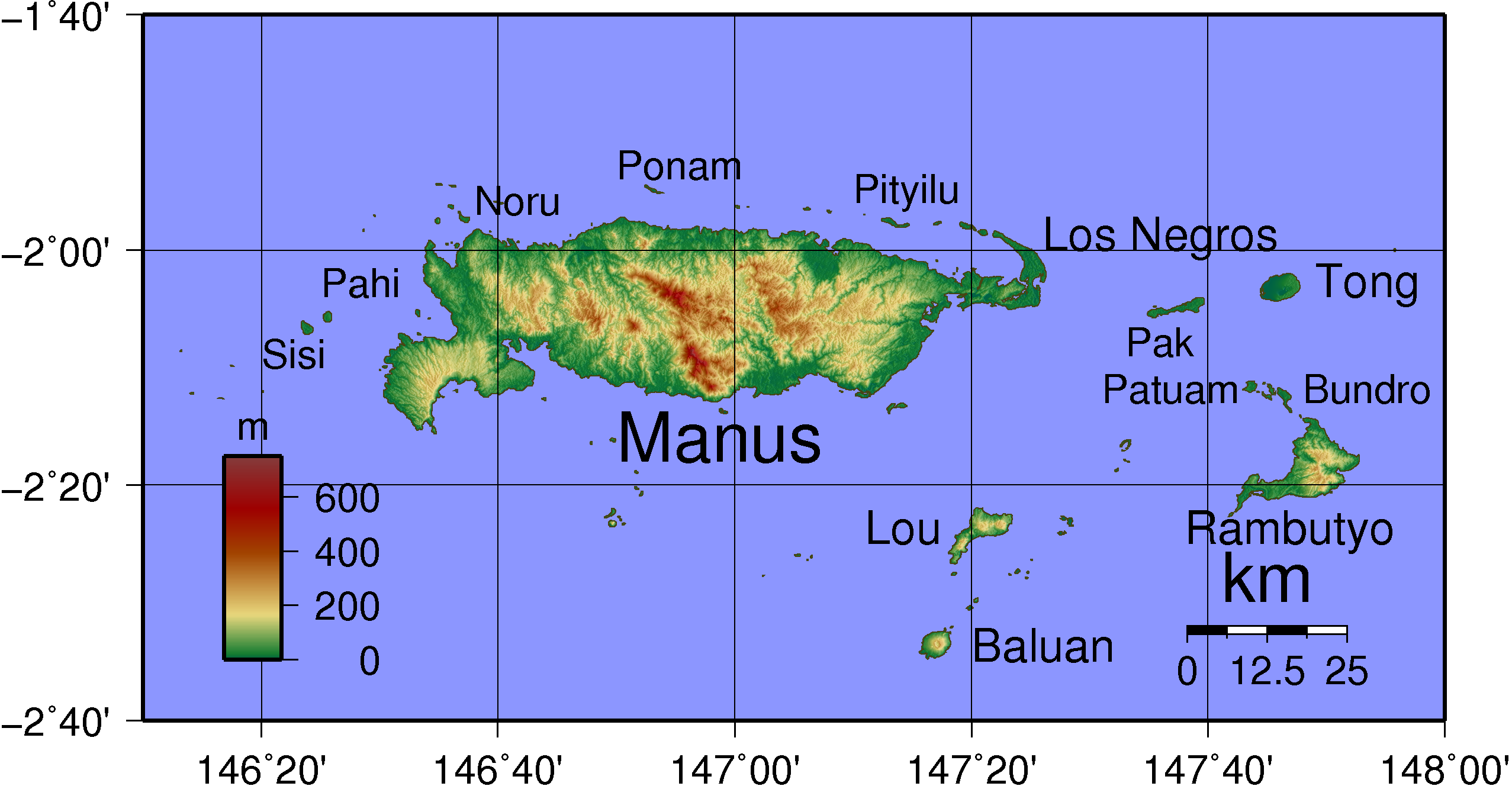
Rambutyo Island is to the southeast of Manus Island

Rambutyo Island (or Rambutso Island) is one of the Admiralty Islands in the Bismarck Archipelago. Administratively, Rambutyo Island is part of Manus Province, Papua New Guinea. The population (unknown) is concentrated on the west coast. Villages include Mouklen (pop.500+, close to a defunct plantation) and Lengkau.

== Geography ==
Rambutyo Island is 88 km^{2} (34 sq mi) and is located 50 km (31 mi) SE of Manus Island, part of the Hornos Island Group. It is roughly triangular in shape with a base 16 km (9.9 mi) in diameter east–west. The centre of the island has a volcanic peak about 230 m (750 ft) high. Offshore lie important reef complexes.

The island was surveyed in 1958 by the Royal Australian Survey Corps.

The vegetation is moist tropical and subtropical forest, with around 3,000 mm (120 in) of rainfall per year. Logging and coconut groves displaced forest at different times. There are endemic species of rats, bats, birds and a cuscus (Spilocuscus kraemeri, Admiralty Island cuscus) across the Admiralty Islands

== History ==
The island has been populated for thousands of years by farmers and fisherfolk, with strong interchange with and movement between other islands in the Admiralty chain. The population has Melanesian and Micronesian ancestry and patrilineal descent rules operate. Shell money, sourced on islands to the north, was used as a means of exchange.

Sago is the most important local food along with fishing, but rice was traded from the period of colonial rule. Free diving for beche-de-mer or sea cucumber generates income.

European discovery of the island took place as part of the 1616 expedition by the Dutch navigators Willem Schouten and Jacob Le Maire, who "traversed Manus, Los Negros, Los Reyes, Pak, Naura, Rambutvo, Baluan, Sauwai, Lou, Tong other small islands".

In 1885 the Admiralty Islands were declared a German Protectorate, administered by the New Guinea Company. German presence ended in 1914. They were governed by Australia until independence in 1975. The Australian presence was small, but introduced health programs, censuses and patrols, dispute adjudication and schooling, leading to greater use of Pidgin and English.

During World War II, the island was occupied by a small contingent of Japanese soldiers. On 3 April 1944, Allied forces led by the U.S. 12th Cavalry Regiment landed on Rambutyo. By 23 April, the forces were withdrawn for mop-up by the native police force.

The anthropologist Margaret Mead, who lived on Manus Island in 1928-29 and 1953, reported a "cargo-cult" movement began on Rambutyo just after WWII, in which people destroyed all their possessions in expectation of a millennial coming. The movement spread to other islands but the "prophet" Wapi was killed when the spirits of the dead never materialized with the "white man's cargo".

The island had copra plantations under private European and Japanese ownership during the period of German and Australian rule. The Japanese trader and entrepreneur Isokichi Komine owned a plantation under German rule, assisted Australian conquest of the islands, but was eventually disenfranchised by Australian anti-Japanese sentiment. Lengendrowa plantation was bought in 1964 to form a cooperative, with 269 people moving from Mouk Island off Baluan. Initial cooperative success was followed by financial collapse, and the plantation was later divided into blocks.
