= Mioko Island =

Island in Papua New Guinea

Mioko
Native name: Kilungaul
- Duke of York Islands

- Location within Papua New Guinea

Geography
- Location: Oceania
- Coordinates: 4°13′47″S 152°27′36″E
- Archipelago: bismark
- Area: 1.3 km^{2} (0.50 sq mi)
- Highest point: 33

Administration
- Papua New Guinea

Mioko is a populated island in the Duke of York Islands archipelago in Papua New Guinea. Located in East New Britain Province, in the east of the country, about 800 km (500 mi) north of Port Moresby.

== Geography ==
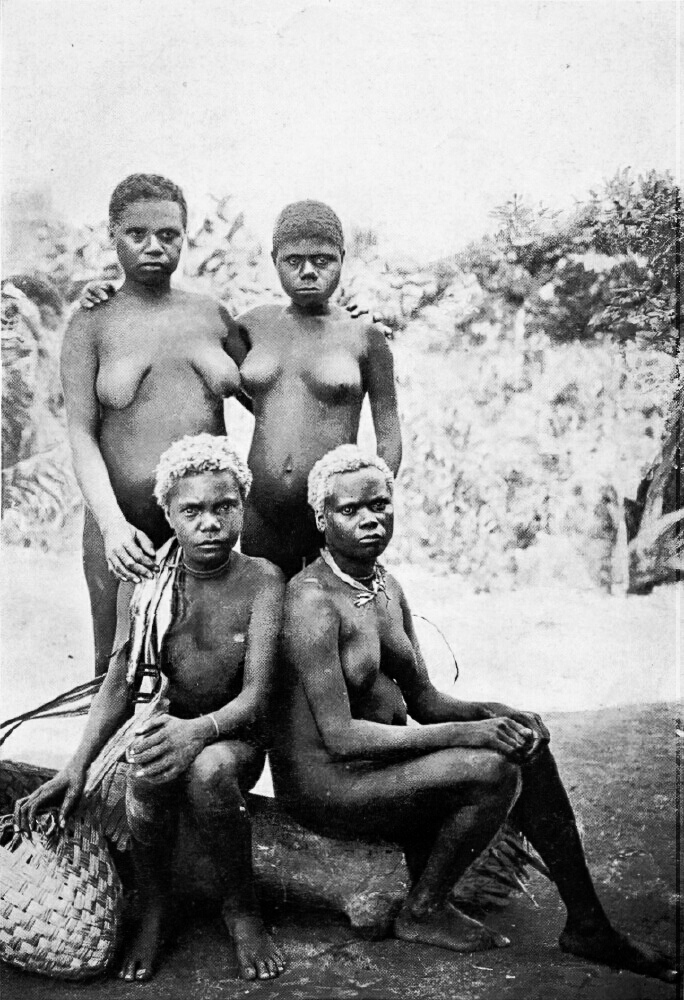
Women on Mioko Island, ca. 1900

The land of Mioko Island is generally flat with the highest point being 33 metres (108 ft) above sea level. The island is about 1.3 km (0.81 mi) from north to south and 1.9 km (1.2 mi) east to west with an area of about 1.3 square kilometres (0.50 sq mi).
