= Kerawara =

Island in Papua New Guinea

- Duke of York Islands

- Location within Papua New Guinea

Geography
- Location: Oceania
- Coordinates: 4°15′S 152°25′E
- Archipelago: Duke of York Islands
- Total islands: 13
- Major islands: Duke of York Island, Papua New Guinea
- Area: 0.84 km^{2} (0.32 sq mi)
- Highest point: 23

Administration
- Papua New Guinea

Kerawara is an island in the Duke of York Islands archipelago in Papua New Guinea. It is located in the east of the country, in the East New Britain Province, about 800 km (500 mi) to the east of the Port Moresby.

== Geography ==
The land of Kerawara Island is flat. The highest point on the island is 23 metres (75 ft) above sea level. It covers 1.0 km (0.6 mi) from the north to the south and 1.7 km (1.1 mi) from the east to the west. In total island covers about 0.84 square kilometres (0.32 sq mi).
