= Big Ndrova Island =

Island in Papua New Guinea

- Interactive map of Big Ndrova Island

Geography
- Coordinates: 2.220442°S 147.233999°E
- Archipelago: Admiralty Islands

Administration
- Papua New Guinea
- Province: Manus Province

Big Ndrova Island, sometimes called simply Ndrova Island, is an island of Manus Province, Papua New Guinea, one of the Admiralty Islands. It is off the southern coast of Manus Island.
