= Bipi language =

West Manus language of Papua New Guinea

Bipi
- Native to: Papua New Guinea
- Region: Bipi and Sisi Islands, Manus Province
- Native speakers: (1,380 cited 2000)
- Language family: Austronesian: Malayo-Polynesian; Oceanic; Admiralty Islands; Eastern Admiralty Islands; Manus; West Manus; Bipi

Language codes
- ISO 639-3: biq
- Glottolog: bipi1237

The Bipi language is the westernmost West Manus language. It is spoken by approximately 1200 people on the Bipi and Sisi Islands off the west coast of Manus Island, Manus Province of Papua New Guinea. It has SVO word order.
