= Admiralty Islands =

Archipelago in the South Pacific Ocean

Native name: Admiralty Ailans
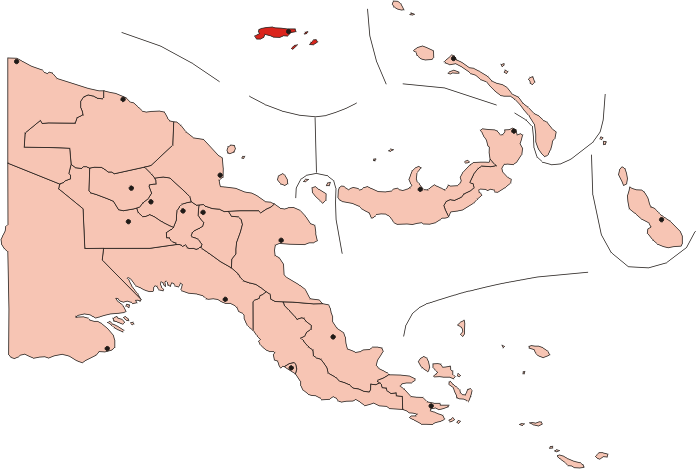
- Map of Papua New Guinea. The Admiralty Islands are in the dark red area at the top of the map.

Geography
- Coordinates: 2°06′S 146°57′E

Administration
- Papua New Guinea
- Province: Manus Province

Demographics
- Population: 60,485 (2011 Census)
- Pop. density: 28.8/km^{2} (74.6/sq mi)

The Admiralty Islands are an archipelago group of 40 islands in the Bismarck Archipelago, to the north of New Guinea in the South Pacific Ocean. These are also sometimes known as the Manus Islands, after the largest island of the chain.

These rainforest-covered islands constitute Manus Province, the smallest and least-populous province of Papua New Guinea, in its Islands Region. The total area is 2,100 km^{2} (810 sq mi). The province had a population of 60,485 at the 2011 Census. Many of the smaller Admiralty Islands are atolls and uninhabited.

== Islands ==
The larger islands in the center of the group are Manus Island and Los Negros Island. The other larger islands are Tong Island, Pak Island, Rambutyo Island and Lou Island to the east, Mbuke Island to the south and Bipi Island to the west of Manus Island. Baluan Island, to the south of Manus Island, is the main island of the Pam Islands, where the Baluan-Pam language is spoken. Other islands that have been noted as significant places in the history of Manus include Ndrova Island, Pityilu Island and Ponam Island.

== Geography ==
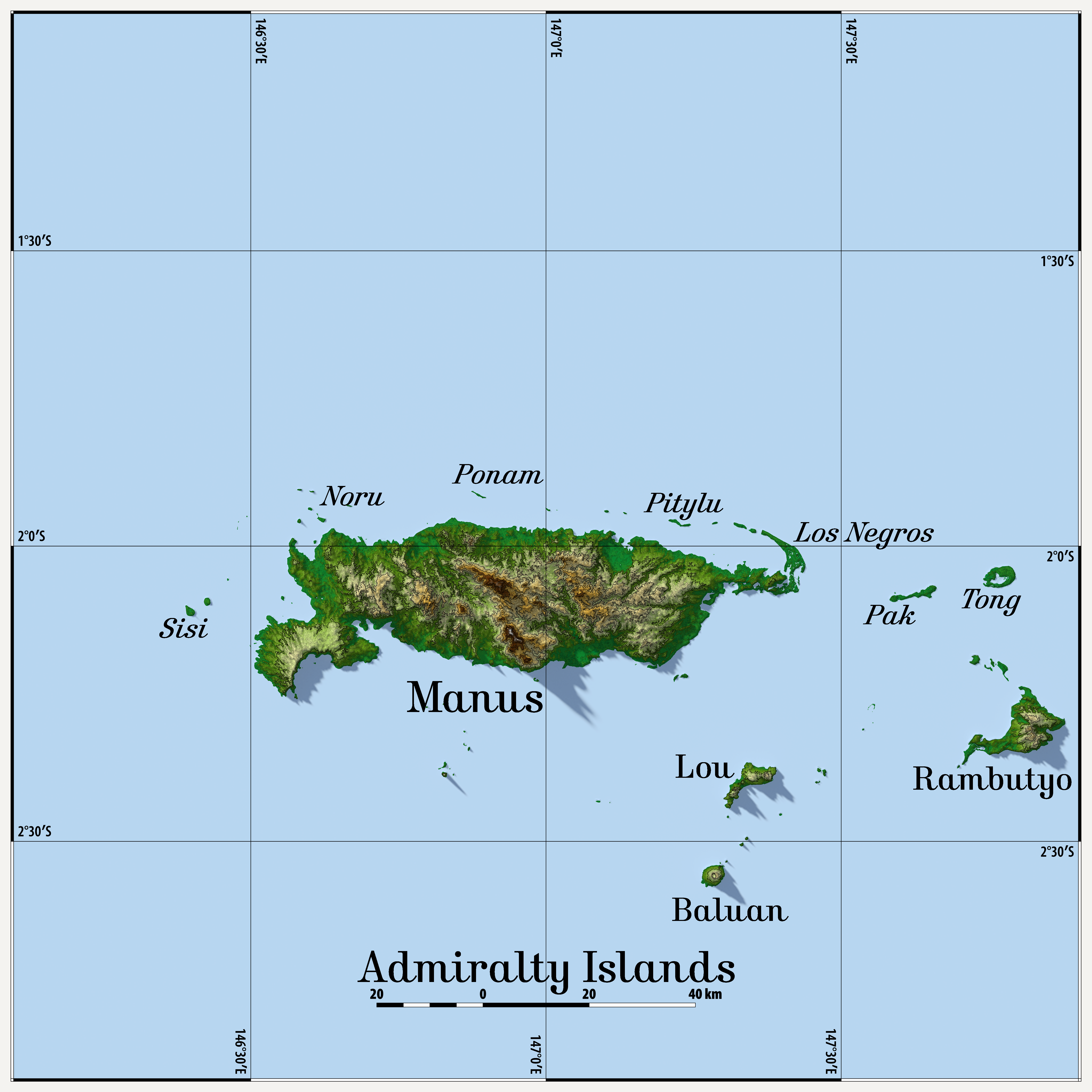
Manus is the largest of the Admiralty Islands.

The temperature of the Admiralty Islands varies little throughout the year, reaching daily highs of 30–32 °C (86–90 °F) and 20–24 °C (68–75 °F) at night. Average annual rainfall is 3,382 mm (133 in) and is somewhat seasonal, with June–August being the wettest months.

Manus reaches an elevation of 700 m (2,300 ft) and is volcanic in origin and probably broke through the ocean's surface in the late Miocene, 8–10 million years ago. The substrate of the island is either directly volcanic or from uplifted coral limestone.

The main town in the islands is Lorengau on Manus, connected by road to an airport on nearby Los Negros Island, otherwise transport around the islands is by boat. There is little tourism, although the seas are attractive to divers, including Jean-Michel Cousteau who spent time on nearby Wuvulu Island in the 1970s.

== Ecology ==
Due to the isolated location, the rain forests of the Admiralty Islands are home to rare and endemic species of birds, bats and other animals, and are considered a separate ecoregion, the Admiralty Islands lowland rain forests. The majority of the forests on Manus still remain, but some of the smaller islands have been cleared for coconut farming. The typical tree species are various Calophyllum and Sararanga species.

The 58.5 km^{2} (22.6 sq mi) Ndrolowa Wildlife Management Area was created in March 1985 south of Lorengau on Manus Island and contains both terrestrial and marine regions. A further 240 km^{2} (93 sq mi) protected area has been established around the highest mountain on Manus, Mount Dremsel, but the level of protection remains undetermined in the UNEP World Database on Protected Areas.

Three of the bird species endemic to Admiralty Islands have been listed as vulnerable in the IUCN Red List: Manus fantail (Rhipidura semirubra), superb pitta (Pitta superba) and Manus masked owl (Tyto manusi), and the Manus dwarf kingfisher (Ceyx dispar) listed as near threatened. Three other birds are endemic to Admiralty Islands but are classified as non-threatened or least concern: white-naped friarbird (Philemon albitorques), Manus monarch (Monarcha infelix) and Manus hawk owl (Ninox meeki). Birds found mainly but not exclusively on the Admiralty Islands include Melanesian megapode (Megapodius eremita), yellow-bibbed fruit-dove (Ptilinopus solomonensis), yellowish imperial-pigeon (Ducula subflavescens), pied cuckoo-dove (Reinwardtoena browni), Meek's pygmy parrot (Micropsitta meeki), black-headed white-eye (Zosterops hypoxanthus) and ebony myzomela (Myzomela pammelaena).

Mammals found only here or on nearby island groups include the large fruit bats, Admiralty flying-fox (Pteropus admiralitatum), Andersen's naked-backed fruit bat (Dobsonia anderseni) and Seri's sheathtail-bat (Emballonura serii) while the two pure-endemics are Admiralty Island cuscus (Spilocuscus kraemeri) and a local mosaic-tailed rat (Melomys matambuai). The islands are home to two endemic Cornufer frogs (Cornufer admiraltiensis and Cornufer latro) and four lizards, while the emerald green snail of Manus was the first terrestrial snail to be listed as vulnerable by the IUCN.

== History ==
=== Prehistory ===
Along with New Guinea, the Bismarck Archipelago and the Solomon Islands Archipelago, the Admiralty Islands were first inhabited approximately 40,000 years ago, in the initial wave of migration out of Southeast Asia that also populated Australia. This early society appears to have cultivated taro, and to have deliberately introduced wild animals from New Guinea such as bandicoots and large rats. Obsidian was gathered and traded throughout the Admiralty Islands archipelago.

The Lapita culture arose around 3,500 years ago, and its extent ranged from the Admiralty Islands to Tonga and Samoa. Its origins are contested, but it may well have been a product of another wave of migration from Southeast Asia. Lapita society featured renowned pottery, stilt houses, the introduction of domestic animals such as pigs, dogs, and chickens, and substantial developments in agriculture and boat technology, allowing long-distance trade to develop. Lapita society, as a distinct culture and extended trade network, collapsed around 2,000 years ago.

=== European and Japanese periods ===
The first European to visit the islands was the Spanish navigator Álvaro de Saavedra when trying to return from Tidore to New Spain in the summer of 1528. Saavedra charted Manus as Urays la Grande. Its visit was also reported in 1616 by the Dutch navigator Willem Schouten. The name 'Admiralty Islands' was devised by Captain Philip Carteret of the British Royal Navy in 1767.

Between 1884 and 1914 the area was administered as a German colony. In November 1914, the islands were occupied by troops of the Australian Naval and Military Expeditionary Force landed from the SS Siar. A few shots fired from a machine gun on Siar over the heads of the tiny German garrison at Lorengau were the last shots fired in the battle. After the war, the islands were governed by the Commonwealth of Australia under a League of Nations mandate.

Japanese troops landed on Manus Island on 7 April 1942. In 1944, Japanese forces occupying the islands were attacked and defeated by Allied forces in Operation Brewer. Subsequently, a large American airbase and Manus Naval Base was built at Lombrum near Lorengau.

=== Independence ===
Following Papuan independence in 1975, the Admiralty Islands became part of Papua New Guinea.

They became the Manus Province of the Islands Region in Papua New Guinea.

== See also ==
- Admiralty (disambiguation)
- Admiralty Islands languages
- US Naval Advance Bases
