= Tong Island, Papua New Guinea =

Island of Papua New Guinea

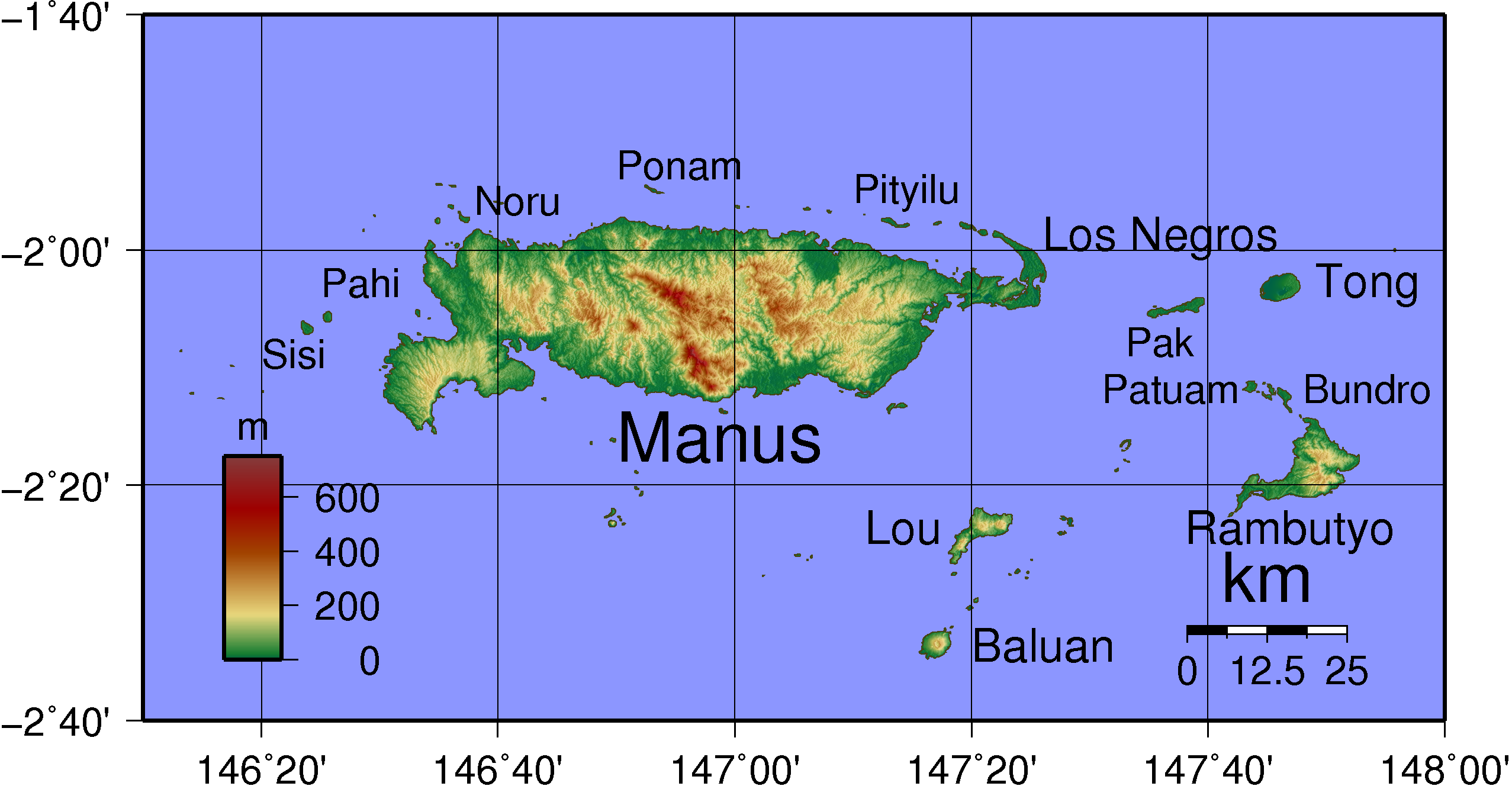
- Map of Admiralty Islands showing Tong Island
- Interactive map of Tong Island, Papua New Guinea

Geography
- Location: Bismarck Sea
- Coordinates: 2.051°S 147.767°E
- Archipelago: Admiralty Islands

Administration
- Papua New Guinea
- Province: Manus Province

Tong Island, Papua New Guinea is an island of Papua New Guinea.
