= Duke of York Islands =

Islands in Papua New Guinea

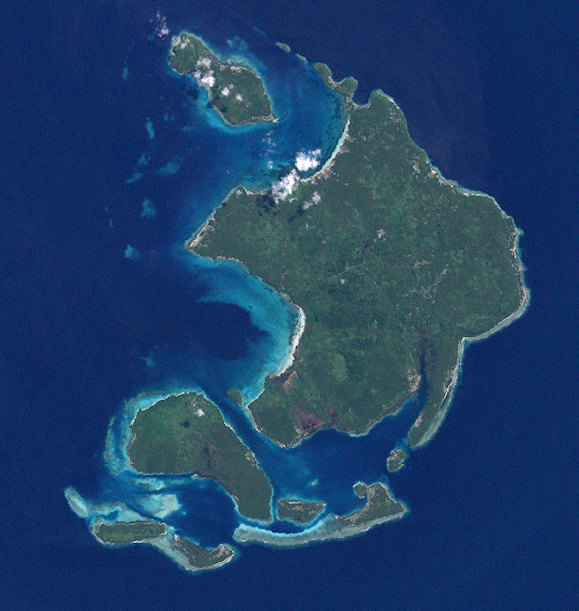
- Duke of York Islands seen from space

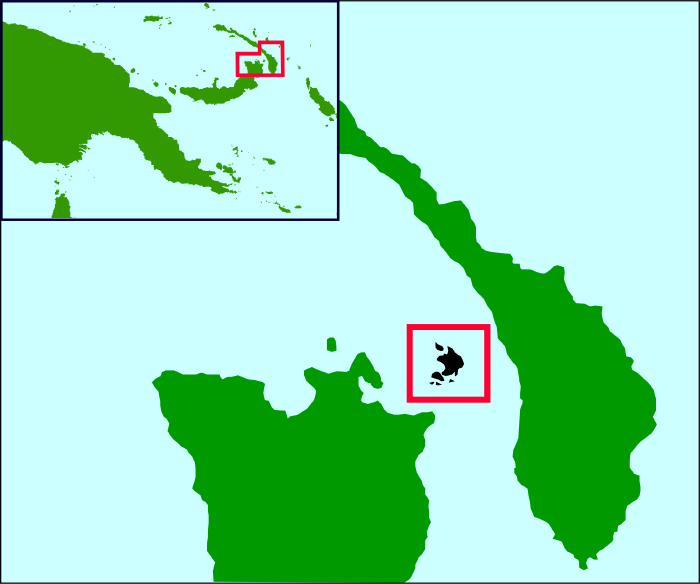
- Location of Duke of York Islands

- Location within Papua New Guinea

Geography
- Location: Melanesia
- Coordinates: 4°9′47″S 152°27′33″E
- Archipelago: Bismarck Archipelago
- Total islands: 13
- Major islands: 7
- Area: 58 km^{2} (22 sq mi)

Administration
- Papua New Guinea
- Province: East New Britain Province
- LLG: Duke of York Rural LLG

The Duke of York Islands (formerly German: Neulauenburg) are a group of islands located in East New Britain Province, Papua New Guinea. They are found in St George's Channel between New Britain and New Ireland islands and form part of the Bismarck Archipelago. The Duke of York Islands were named in 1767 by Philip Carteret to honour Prince Edward, son of Frederick, Prince of Wales and younger brother of George III of the United Kingdom.

== History ==
In the 1870s and 1880s German commercial firms began to site trading stations in New Guinea. Agents of J. C. Godeffroy & Sohn reached the Bismarck Archipelago from the Caroline Islands in 1872 and had established a trading post on the Islands from 1876.

The wreck of HMAS AE1, lost in 1914 possibly due to a diving accident, was located near these islands in December 2017 after 13 search missions. The submarine was found at a depth of 300 metres (980 ft) and was seen to be well preserved and in one piece. The exact location of the wreck was not announced by the Australian government at the time of discovery, to protect it from "unauthorized salvage attempts". The government's stated position is that the wreck will be treated as a war grave.

== Geography ==
Map of Duke of York Islands

The Duke of York islands consist of a total of 13 islands and cover 58 square kilometres (22 sq mi) in area. The largest island of the group is Duke of York Island, and other islands include Makada, Kabakon, Kerawara, Ulu, Mioko, and Mualim.

The island group lies in an active seismic zone, where two tectonic plates push upon each other. Earthquakes and tsunamis are not uncommon for inhabitants of the islands.

The islands are low-lying, and are threatened with inundation due to rising sea levels. On 28 November 2000 the evacuation and resettlement of one thousand inhabitants to New Britain was announced.

== See also ==
- Duke of York Rural LLG
