= Duke of York Island, Papua New Guinea =

Island in Papua New Guinea

Duke of York Island
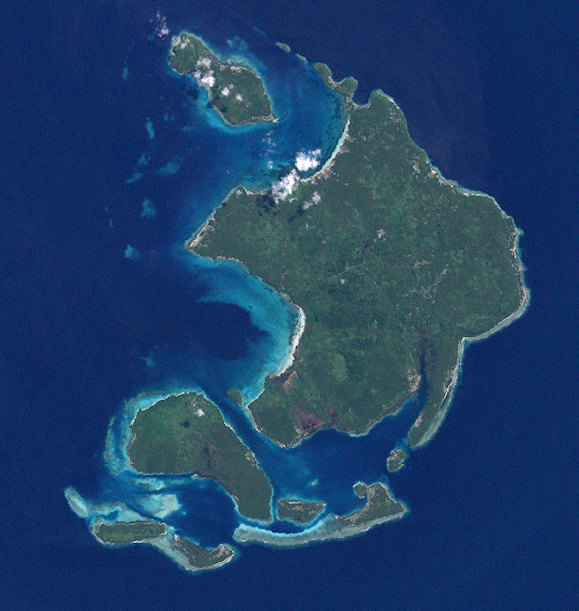
- Duke of York Islands seen from space

Administration
- Papua New Guinea

Duke of York Island is the largest island of the Duke of York Islands, Papua New Guinea, at 4.1666667°S 152.4666667°E. The island is named after Prince Frederick, the second son of King George III of Great Britain.

== Shared name ==
There is also a Duke of York Island at 71°37′33.74″S 170°2′56.88″E in North Victoria Land in East-Antarctica, at the southern end of Robertson Bay, not far from Cape Adare.
