= ISO 639:l =

List of ISO 639-3 language codes starting with L

This is a list of ISO 639-3 language codes starting with L.

Index | a | b | c | d | e | f | g | h | i | j | k | l | m | n | o | p | q | r | s | t | u | v | w | x | y | z

Abbreviations are used in the table as follows:

- Scope: I = individual language, M = macrolanguage, S = special code
- Type: C = constructed, E = extinct (in recent times), H = historical (distinct from its modern form), L = living, S = special code

Deprecated codes are enclosed in (parentheses).

The column Family contains the generic English name of the language's family or macrolanguage.

ISO 639 codes			Scope/Type	Family	Language names	
639-3	639-1	639-2/B	Scope/Type	Family	Native	ISO name
laa			I/L			Southern Subanen
lab			I/H	unclassified		Linear A
lac			I/L			Lacandon
lad		lad	I/L		ג'ודיאו–איספאנייול	Ladino
lae			I/L			Pattani
laf			I/L			Lafofa
lag			I/L	Atlantic–Congo	Kɨlaangi	Rangi
lah		lah	M/L		ਲਹਿੰਦੀ	Lahnda
lai			I/L			Lambya
laj			I/L			Lango (Uganda)
(lak)			I/L			Laka (Nigeria)
lal			I/L			Lalia
lam		lam	I/L			Lamba
lan			I/L			Laru
lao	lo	lao	I/L	Tai–Kadai	ພາສາລາວ	Lao
lap			I/L			Laka (Chad)
laq			I/L			Qabiao
lar			I/L			Larteh
las			I/L			Lama (Togo)
lat	la	lat	I/H	Indo-European	lingua Latīna	Latin
lau			I/L			Laba
lav	lv	lav	M/L	Indo-European	latviešu	Latvian
law			I/L			Lauje
lax			I/L			Tiwa
lay			I/L	Sino-Tibetan		Lama Bai
laz			I/E			Aribwatsa
(lba)			I/E	spurious language		Lui
lbb			I/L			Label
lbc			I/L			Lakkia
lbe			I/L		лакку	Lak
lbf			I/L			Tinani
lbg			I/L			Laopang
lbi			I/L			La'bi
lbj			I/L			Ladakhi
lbk			I/L			Central Bontok
lbl			I/L			Libon Bikol
lbm			I/L			Lodhi
lbn			I/L			Rmeet
lbo			I/L			Laven
lbq			I/L			Wampar
lbr			I/L			Lohorung
lbs			I/L			Libyan Sign Language
lbt			I/L			Lachi
lbu			I/L			Labu
lbv			I/L			Lavatbura-Lamusong
lbw			I/L			Tolaki
lbx			I/L			Lawangan
lby			I/E			Lamalama; Lamu-Lamu
lbz			I/L			Lardil
lcc			I/L			Legenyem
lcd			I/L			Lola
lce			I/L			Loncong; Sekak
lcf			I/L			Lubu
lch			I/L			Luchazi
lcl			I/L			Lisela
lcm			I/L			Tungag
lcp			I/L			Western Lawa
lcq			I/L			Luhu
lcs			I/L			Lisabata-Nuniali
lda			I/L			Kla-Dan
ldb			I/L			Dũya
ldd			I/L			Luri
ldg			I/L			Lenyima
ldh			I/L			Lamja-Dengsa-Tola
ldi			I/L			Laari
ldj			I/L			Lemoro
ldk			I/L			Leelau
ldl			I/L			Kaan
ldm			I/L			Landoma
ldn			I/C			Láadan
ldo			I/L			Loo
ldp			I/L			Tso
ldq			I/L			Lufu
lea			I/L			Lega-Shabunda
leb			I/L			Lala-Bisa
lec			I/L			Leco
led			I/L			Lendu
lee			I/L			Lyélé
lef			I/L			Lelemi
(leg)			I/L			Lengua
leh			I/L			Lenje
lei			I/L			Lemio
lej			I/L			Lengola
lek			I/L			Leipon
lel			I/L			Lele (Democratic Republic of Congo)
lem			I/L			Nomaande
len			I/E			Lenca
leo			I/L			Leti (Cameroon)
lep			I/L	Sino-Tibetan	ᰛᰩᰵᰛᰧᰵᰶ	Lepcha
leq			I/L			Lembena
ler			I/L			Lenkau
les			I/L			Lese
let			I/L			Amio-Gelimi; Lesing-Gelimi
leu			I/L			Kara (Papua New Guinea)
lev			I/L			Lamma
lew			I/L			Ledo Kaili
lex			I/L			Luang
ley			I/L			Lemolang
lez		lez	I/L		лезги	Lezghian
lfa			I/L			Lefa
lfb			I/L	Niger–Congo?	Nubabo	Buu (Cameroon)
lfn			I/C			Lingua Franca Nova
lga			I/L			Lungga
lgb			I/L			Laghu
lgg			I/L			Lugbara
lgh			I/L			Laghuu
lgi			I/L			Lengilu
lgk			I/L			Lingarak; Neverver
lgl			I/L			Wala
lgm			I/L			Lega-Mwenga
lgn			I/L			Opuuo; T'apo
lgo			I/L	Nilo-Saharan		Lango (South Sudan)
lgq			I/L			Logba
lgr			I/L			Lengo
lgs			I/L			Guinea-Bissau Sign Language; Língua Gestual Guineense
lgt			I/L			Pahi
lgu			I/L			Longgu
lgz			I/L			Ligenza
lha			I/L			Laha (Viet Nam)
lhh			I/L			Laha (Indonesia)
lhi			I/L	Sino-Tibetan	Ladhofshi	Lahu Shi
lhl			I/L			Lahul Lohar
lhm			I/L			Lhomi
lhn			I/L			Lahanan
lhp			I/L	Sino-Tibetan	Lhobikha	Lhokpu
lhs			I/E			Mlahsö
lht			I/L			Lo-Toga
lhu			I/L	Sino-Tibetan	Laˇhuˍ hkawˇ	Lahu
lia			I/L			West-Central Limba
lib			I/L			Likum
lic			I/L			Hlai
lid			I/L			Nyindrou
lie			I/L			Likila
lif			I/L	Sino-Tibetan	ᤕᤠᤰᤌᤢᤱ ᤐᤠᤴ	Limbu
lig			I/L			Ligbi
lih			I/L			Lihir
(lii)			I/L			Lingkhim
lij			I/L	Indo-European	líguru	Ligurian
lik			I/L			Lika
lil			I/L		Sƛ’aƛ’imxǝc	Lillooet
lim	li	lim	I/L	Indo-European	Lèmburgs	Limburgan; Limburger; Limburgish
lin	ln	lin	I/L	Niger–Congo	Lingala	Lingala
lio			I/L			Liki
lip			I/L			Sekpele
liq			I/L			Libido
lir			I/L			Liberian English
lis			I/L	Sino-Tibetan	ꓡꓲ-ꓢꓴ ꓥꓳ	Lisu
lit	lt	lit	I/L	Indo-European	lietuvių	Lithuanian
liu			I/L			Logorik
liv			I/L			Liv
liw			I/L			Col
lix			I/L			Liabuku
liy			I/L			Banda-Bambari
liz			I/L			Libinza
lja			I/E			Golpa
lje			I/L			Rampi
lji			I/L			Laiyolo
ljl			I/L			Li'o
ljp			I/L			Lampung Api
ljw			I/L			Yirandali
ljx			I/E			Yuru
lka			I/L			Lakalei
lkb			I/L			Kabras; Lukabaras
lkc			I/L	Sino-Tibetan		Kucong
lkd			I/L			Lakondê
lke			I/L			Kenyi
lkh			I/L			Lakha
lki			I/L		له کی له کستان	Laki
lkj			I/L			Remun
lkl			I/L			Laeko-Libuat
lkm			I/E			Kalaamaya
lkn			I/L			Lakon; Vure
lko			I/L			Khayo; Olukhayo
lkr			I/L			Päri
lks			I/L			Kisa; Olushisa
lkt			I/L		Lakȟótiyapi	Lakota
lku			I/E			Kungkari
lky			I/L			Lokoya
lla			I/L			Lala-Roba
llb			I/L			Lolo
llc			I/L			Lele (Guinea)
lld			I/L		ladin	Ladin
lle			I/L			Lele (Papua New Guinea)
llf			I/E			Hermit
llg			I/L			Lole
llh			I/L			Lamu
lli			I/L			Teke-Laali
llj			I/E			Ladji Ladji
llk			I/E			Lelak
lll			I/L			Lilau
llm			I/L			Lasalimu
lln			I/L			Lele (Chad)
(llo)			I/L	spurious language		Khlor
llp			I/L			North Efate
llq			I/L			Lolak
lls			I/L			Lithuanian Sign Language
llu			I/L			Lau
llx			I/L			Lauan
lma			I/L			East Limba
lmb			I/L			Merei
lmc			I/E			Limilngan
lmd			I/L			Lumun
lme			I/L			Pévé
lmf			I/L			South Lembata
lmg			I/L			Lamogai
lmh			I/L	Sino-Tibetan	याक्खा	Lambichhong
lmi			I/L			Lombi
lmj			I/L			West Lembata
lmk			I/L			Lamkang
lml			I/L			Hano
(lmm)			I/L	spurious language		Lamam
lmn			I/L			Lambadi
lmo			I/L		lumbard	Lombard
lmp			I/L			Limbum
lmq			I/L			Lamatuka
lmr			I/L			Lamalera
(lms)			I/L			Limousin
(lmt)			I/L			Lematang
lmu			I/L			Lamenu
lmv			I/L			Lomaiviti
lmw			I/L			Lake Miwok
lmx			I/L			Laimbue
lmy			I/L			Lamboya
(lmz)			I/E	spurious language		Lumbee
lna			I/L			Langbashe
lnb			I/L			Mbalanhu
(lnc)			I/L			Languedocien
lnd			I/L			Lun Bawang; Lundayeh
lng			I/H			Langobardic
lnh			I/L			Lanoh
lni			I/L			Daantanai'
lnj			I/E			Leningitij
lnl			I/L			South Central Banda
lnm			I/L			Langam
lnn			I/L			Lorediakarkar
(lno)			I/L			Lango (South Sudan)
lns			I/L			Lamnso'
(lnt)			I/L			Lintang
lnu			I/L			Longuda
lnw			I/E			Lanima
lnz			I/L			Lonzo
loa			I/L			Loloda
lob			I/L			Lobi
loc			I/L			Inonhan
(lod)			I/L			Berawan
loe			I/L			Saluan
lof			I/L			Logol
log			I/L			Logo
loh			I/L	Southern Eastern Sudanic	Narim, Laarim	Laarim; Narim
loi			I/L			Loma (Côte d'Ivoire)
loj			I/L			Lou
lok			I/L			Loko
lol		lol	I/L			Mongo
lom			I/L		Lö(g)ömàgòòi	Loma (Liberia)
lon			I/L			Malawi Lomwe
loo			I/L			Lombo
lop			I/L			Lopa
loq			I/L			Lobala
lor			I/L			Téén
los			I/L			Loniu
lot			I/L			Otuho
lou			I/L			Louisiana Creole
lov			I/L			Lopi
low			I/L			Tampias Lobu
lox			I/L			Loun
loy			I/L			Loke
loz		loz	I/L		siLozi	Lozi
lpa			I/L			Lelepa
lpe			I/L			Lepki
lpn			I/L			Long Phuri Naga
lpo			I/L			Lipo
lpx			I/L			Lopit
lqr			I/L	Nilo-Saharan		Logir
lra			I/L			Rara Bakati'
lrc			I/L			Northern Luri
lre			I/E			Laurentian
lrg			I/E			Laragia
lri			I/L			Marachi; Olumarachi
lrk			I/L			Loarki
lrl			I/L			Lari
lrm			I/L			Marama; Olumarama
lrn			I/L			Lorang
lro			I/L			Laro
lrr			I/L			Southern Yamphu
lrt			I/L			Larantuka Malay
lrv			I/L			Larevat
lrz			I/L			Lemerig
lsa			I/L			Lasgerdi
lsb			I/L			Burundian Sign Language; Langue des Signes Burundaise
lsc			I/L			Albarradas Sign Language; Lengua de señas Albarradas
lsd			I/L			Lishana Deni
lse			I/L			Lusengo
(lsg)			I/L	spurious language		Lyons Sign Language
lsh			I/L	Sino-Tibetan	Lishpa	Lish
lsi			I/L			Lashi
lsl			I/L			Latvian Sign Language
lsm			I/L			Olusamia; Saamia
lsn			I/L			Tibetan Sign Language
lso			I/L			Laos Sign Language
lsp			I/L			Lengua de Señas Panameñas; Panamanian Sign Language
lsr			I/L			Aruop
lss			I/L			Lasi
lst			I/L			Trinidad and Tobago Sign Language
lsv			I/L			Sivia Sign Language
lsw			I/L	unclear		Seychelles Sign Language; Lalang Siny Seselwa; Langue des Signes Seychelloise
lsy			I/L			Mauritian Sign Language
ltc			I/H	Sino-Tibetan		Late Middle Chinese
ltg			I/L			Latgalian
lth			I/L	Nilo-Saharan		Thur
lti			I/L			Leti (Indonesia)
ltn			I/L			Latundê
lto			I/L			Olutsotso; Tsotso
lts			I/L			Lutachoni; Tachoni
ltu			I/L			Latu
ltz	lb	ltz	I/L	Indo-European	Lëtzebuergesch	Letzeburgesch; Luxembourgish
lua		lua	I/L	Niger–Congo	lwaà:	Luba-Lulua
lub	lu	lub	I/L	Niger–Congo		Luba-Katanga
luc			I/L			Aringa
lud			I/L		lüüdi	Ludian
lue			I/L			Luvale
luf			I/L			Laua
lug	lg	lug	I/L	Niger–Congo	Luganda	Ganda
luh			I/L	Sino-Tibetan	雷州话	Leizhou Chinese
lui		lui	I/E	Uto-Aztecan	Chamꞌteela	Luiseño
luj			I/L			Luna
luk			I/L			Lunanakha
lul			I/L			Olu'bo
lum			I/L			Luimbi
lun		lun	I/L		chiLunda	Lunda
luo		luo	I/L		Dholuo	Dholuo; Luo (Kenya and Tanzania)
lup			I/L			Lumbu
luq			I/L		Lucumí	Lucumi
lur			I/L			Laura
lus		lus	I/L	Sino-Tibetan	Mizo ṭawng	Lushai
lut			I/E		Dəxʷləšucid	Lushootseed
luu			I/L	Sino-Tibetan	याक्खा	Lumba-Yakkha
luv			I/L			Luwati
luw			I/L	unclassified		Luo (Cameroon)
luy			M/L			Luyia; Oluluyia
luz			I/L			Southern Luri
lva			I/L			Maku'a
lvi			I/L	Austronesian		Lavi
lvk			I/L			Lavukaleve
lvl			I/L	Niger–Congo		Lwel
lvs			I/L			Standard Latvian
lvu			I/L			Levuka
lwa			I/L			Lwalu
lwe			I/L			Lewo Eleng
lwg			I/L			Oluwanga; Wanga
lwh			I/L			White Lachi
lwl			I/L			Eastern Lawa
lwm			I/L			Laomian
lwo			I/L			Luwo
lws			I/L			Malawian Sign Language
lwt			I/L			Lewotobi
lwu			I/L			Lawu
lww			I/L			Lewo
lxm			I/L	Austronesian		Lakurumau
lya			I/L			Layakha
lyg			I/L			Lyngngam
lyn			I/L			Luyana
lzh			I/H	Sino-Tibetan	文言(文)	Literary Chinese
lzl			I/L			Litzlitz
lzn			I/L			Leinong Naga
lzz			I/L		ლაზური	Laz

== Sources ==
- "ISO 639-2 Registration Authority". Library of Congress.
- "ISO 639-3 Registration Authority". SIL International.
- Lewis, M. Paul; Simons, Gary F.; Fennig, Charles D., eds. (2016). "Ethnologue: Languages of the World" (19th ed.). Dallas, Texas: SIL International.
