= Mondropolon language =

West Manus language of Papua New Guinea

Mondropolon
- Native to: Papua New Guinea
- Region: north-central Manus Island, Manus Province
- Native speakers: 720 (2011)
- Language family: Austronesian: Malayo-Polynesian; Oceanic; Admiralty Islands; Eastern Admiralty Islands; Manus; West Manus; Mondropolon

Language codes
- ISO 639-3: npn
- Glottolog: mond1265

The Mondropolon language is a West Manus language spoken by approximately 300 people on north-central Manus Island, Manus Province of Papua New Guinea. Its speakers also use Kurti. It has SVO word order.
