= Manus Koro language =

East Manus language

Koro
- Native to: Manus Province, Papua New Guinea
- Region: northeastern Manus Island and Los Negros Island immediately east
- Native speakers: (900 cited 1977–1983)
- Language family: Austronesian: Malayo-Polynesian; Oceanic; Admiralty Islands; Eastern Admiralty Islands; Manus; East Manus; Koro

Language codes
- ISO 639-3: kxr
- Glottolog: bowa1234
- ELP: Papitalai

The Koro language is an East Manus language spoken by approximately 900 people on northeastern Manus Island and on Los Negros Island to the east in Manus Province of Papua New Guinea. It is largely isolating and has SVO word order.

== Phonology ==
Koro syllable structure is CV word-internally and CV(C) word-finally. The majority of consonant phonemes can occur in onset and coda position, whereas /XXnd/, /XXnd/, and /XXnd/ can occur only in onset position. Koro also exhibits word-final devoicing.

=== Consonants ===
Consonant phonemes
	Bilabial		Alveolar		Post- alveolar (Palato- alveolar)	Palatal	Velar		Glottal
Plosive	p		t	ⁿd		ɟ	k		
Labialised plosive	pʷ								
Affricate					tʃ				
Fricative			s						h
Nasal		m		n				ŋ	
Labialised nasal		mʷ							
Trill		ᵐʙ	r	ⁿr					
Approximant		w				j			
Lateral approximant				l					

=== Vowels ===
Monophthong phonemes
	Front	Back
Close	i	u
Open-mid	ɛ	ɔ
Open	a	

== Grammar ==
Koro is a largely isolating, head-marking, SVO language. It displays nominative–accusative alignment, with a distinction between singular, dual, and plural number in pronouns. Like many other Oceanic languages, Koro morpho-syntactically distinguishes between inalienable and alienable possession, where inalienable nouns are vowel-final, whereas alienable nouns may be consonant final, and alienable nouns but not inalienable nouns require a possessive particle ta when used in possessive constructions. There is an animacy distinction in subject pronouns. Koro uses seven sets of numeral classifiers, some of which can be used referentially (without a noun, as in the use of timou "one (people)" to refer to an individual person). The forms for "seven", "eight", and "nine" are based on subtraction from ten, as with other Eastern Admiralties languages.
