= Likum language =

West Manus language of Papua New Guinea

Likum
- Native to: Papua New Guinea
- Region: westernmost Manus Island, Manus Province
- Native speakers: (80 cited 2000)
- Language family: Austronesian: Malayo-Polynesian; Oceanic; Admiralty Islands; Eastern Admiralty Islands; Manus; West Manus; Likum

Language codes
- ISO 639-3: lib
- Glottolog: liku1243
- ELP: Likum
- Likum is classified as Definitely Endangered by the UNESCO Atlas of the World's Languages in Danger.

The Likum language is a West Manus language spoken by approximately 80 people in western Manus Island, Manus Province of Papua New Guinea. Its speakers also use Nyindrou. Likum is classified as "definitely endangered" by UNESCO's Atlas of the World's Languages in Danger. It has SVO word order.

== Phonology ==
=== Consonants ===
Consonants
		Labial	Alveolar	Palatal	Velar	Glottal
Plosive/Affricate	Voiceless	p	t	c (Note: Blust describes ⟨c⟩ and ⟨j⟩ as palatal affricates, using ⟨y⟩ for /j/.)	k	ʔ
Plosive/Affricate	Labialized	pʷ				
Plosive/Affricate	Voiced	(b)	(d)~ⁿr (Note: Blust says the evidence for /d/ is weak and considers it a variant of ⟨dr⟩, which he describes as a prenasalized alveolar trill.) ⟨dr⟩	j	(g)	
Plosive/Affricate	Voiced labialized	(bʷ)			(gʷ)	
Nasal	Plain	m	n	ɲ		
Nasal	Labialized	mʷ				
Fricative			s			h
Trill			r			
Approximant		w		j ⟨y⟩		

=== Vowels ===
Vowels
	Front	Central	Back
Close	i		u
Mid	e		o
Open		a	

== Pronouns ==
Personal pronouns in Likum have grammatical number and clusivity.

Personal pronouns
	Singular	Dual	Trial	Plural
1st, incl.	je	teru	tocetulumow	to
1st, excl.	je	eru	etucetulumow	etu
2nd	ow	ah	etocetulumow	eto
3rd	iy	neru	drocetulumow	dro
