= Mokerang language =

Oceanic language spoken in Papua New Guinea

Mokerang
- Native to: Papua New Guinea
- Region: Los Negros Island, Manus Province
- Native speakers: (200 cited 1981)
- Language family: Austronesian: Malayo-Polynesian; Oceanic; Admiralty Islands; Eastern Admiralty Islands; Manus; West Manus; Loniu–Mokerang; Mokerang

Language codes
- ISO 639-3: mft
- Glottolog: moke1240
- ELP: Mokerang

Mokerang is an Austronesian language spoken on Los Negros Island, immediately east of Manus Island in Manus Province, Papua New Guinea.
