= Tulu-Bohuai language =

Oceanic language spoken in Papua New Guinea

Tulu-Bohuai
- Native to: Papua New Guinea
- Region: central Manus Island and Peli Island, Manus Province
- Native speakers: (1,400 cited 1982)
- Language family: Austronesian: Malayo-Polynesian; Oceanic; Admiralty Islands; Eastern Admiralty Islands; Manus; West Manus; Tulu-Bohuai

Language codes
- ISO 639-3: rak
- Glottolog: tulu1259

The Tulu-Bohuai language is a West Manus language spoken by approximately 1400 people on central Manus Island and on Peli Island, Manus Province, Papua New Guinea.
