= Loniu language =

Austronesian language of Papua New Guinea

Loniu
- Native to: Papua New Guinea
- Region: Los Negros Island, Manus Province
- Native speakers: (780 cited 2000)
- Language family: Austronesian: Malayo-Polynesian; Oceanic; Admiralty Islands; Eastern Admiralty Islands; Manus; West Manus; Loniu–Mokerang; Loniu

Language codes
- ISO 639-3: los
- Glottolog: loni1238

Loniu is an Austronesian language spoken along the southern coast of Los Negros Island in the Manus Province, immediately east of Manus Island in Manus Province, Papua New Guinea. Loniu is spoken in the villages of Loniu and Lolak, and there are estimated to be 450–500 native speakers, although some live in other Manus villages or on the mainland of Papua New Guinea.

Loniu generally fits with most of the observations made about Oceanic languages, specifically the Admiralty Islands languages. The six morphosyntactic features of 'Type B' Oceanic Languages (which include the Admiralties languages) as noted by Ross are found in Loniu. The language is essentially SVO and contains prepositions.

== Phonology ==
=== Consonant Phonemes ===
	Labial	Alveolar	Palatal	Velar	Glottal
Stop	p	t		k	
Rounded stop	p^{w}				
Affricate			tʃ		
Fricative		s			
Nasal	m	n	ɲ	ŋ	
Rounded nasal	m^{w}				
Lateral Approximant		l			
Trill		r			
Approximant	w		j		

=== Vowel Phonemes ===
	Front	Central	Back
High	i		u
Mid tense	e		o
Mid lax	ɛ		ɔ
