= Sori-Harengan language =

Oceanic language spoken in Papua New Guinea

Sori-Harengan
- Native to: Papua New Guinea
- Region: Sori and Harengan Islands, and northwestern coast of Manus Island, Manus Province
- Native speakers: (570 cited 1977)
- Language family: Austronesian: Malayo-Polynesian; Oceanic; Admiralty Islands; Eastern Admiralty Islands; Manus; West Manus; Sori-Harengan

Language codes
- ISO 639-3: sbh
- Glottolog: sori1242

The Sori-Harengan language is a West Manus language spoken by approximately 570 people on the Sori and Harengan Islands, northwest off the coast of Manus Island, and on the northwestern coast Manus Island, Papua New Guinea. It has SVO word order.
