= Khehek language =

Oceanic language spoken in Papua New Guinea

Khehek
- Levei-Ndrehet
- Native to: Papua New Guinea
- Region: West-central Manus Island, Manus Province
- Native speakers: (1,600 cited 1991)
- Language family: Austronesian: Malayo-Polynesian; Oceanic; Admiralty Islands; Eastern Admiralty Islands; Manus; West Manus; Khehek
- Dialects: Drehet (Ndrehet); Levei

Language codes
- ISO 639-3: tlx
- Glottolog: kheh1237

Khehek is an Oceanic language spoken by approximately 1600 people on west-central Manus Island, Manus Province of Papua New Guinea. It has two dialects, Drehet and Levei, which are sometimes considered separate languages.

== Phonology ==
Drehet dialect
		Bilabial		Alveolar	Palatal	Velar
		Plain	Labialized	Alveolar	Palatal	Velar
Stop	Unaspirated	p	pʷ	t	c	k
Stop	Aspirated					kʰ
Fricative				s		h
Nasal		m	mʷ	n		ŋ
Prenasalized trill				nᵈr		
Lateral				l		
Trill				r		
Semivowel		w			j	

Levei dialect
	Bilabial		Alveolar	Palatal	Velar
	Plain	Labialized	Alveolar	Palatal	Velar
Stop	p	pʷ	t	c	k
Fricative			s		h
Nasal	m	mʷ	n		ŋ
Prenasalized trill			nᵈr		
Lateral			l		
Trill			r		
Semivowel	w			j	
