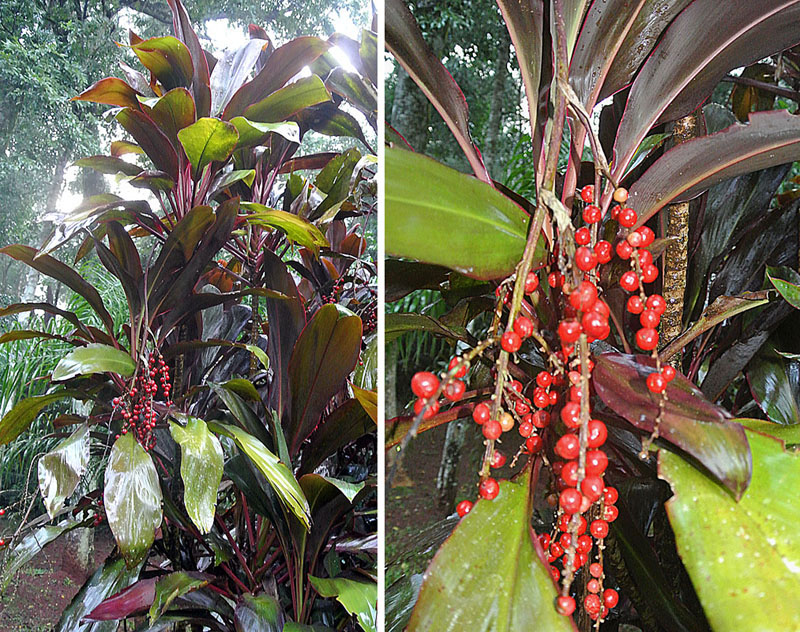
- Foliage and fruit
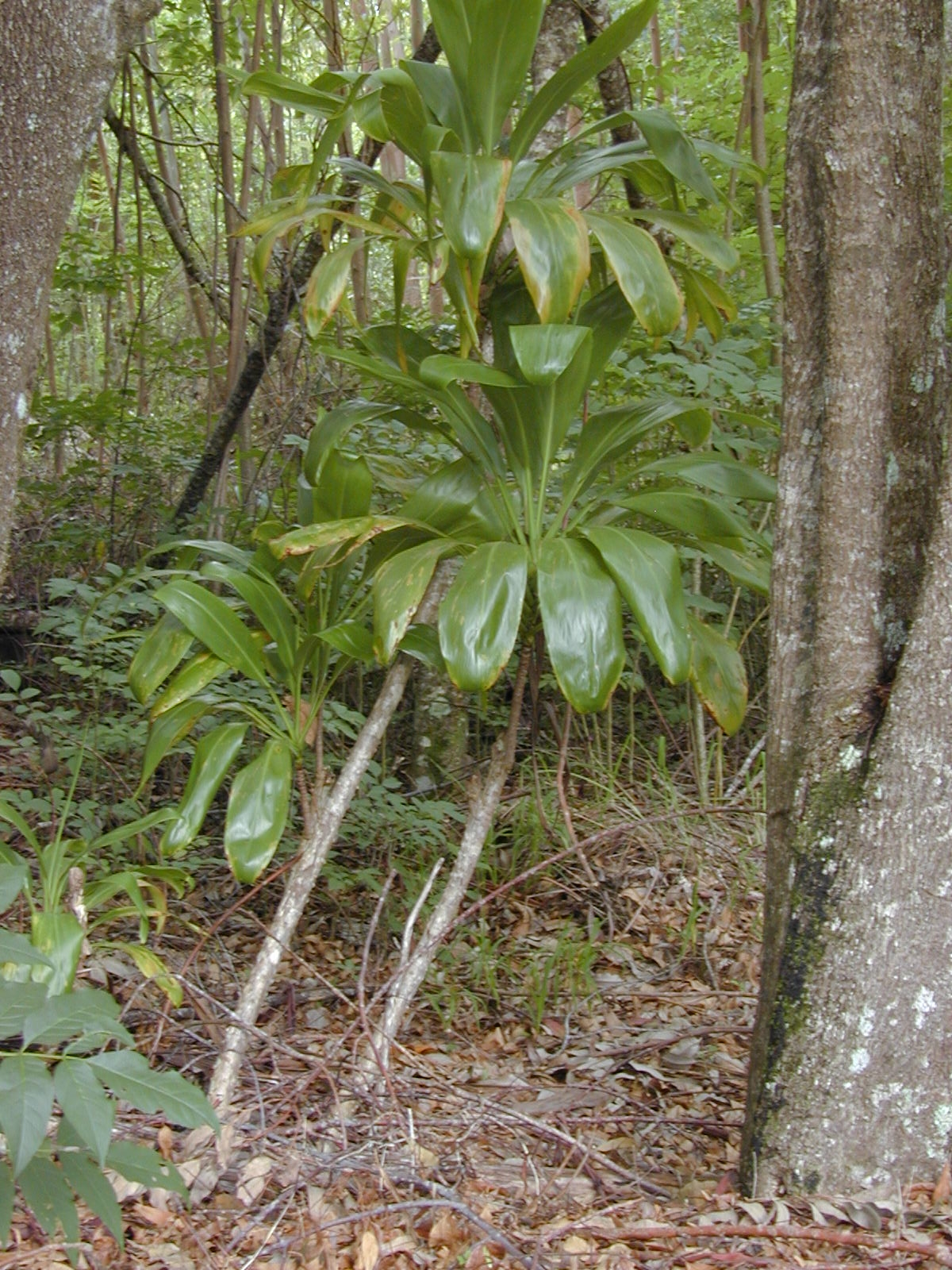
- Green C. fruticosa in Makawao Forest Reserve, Maui

Scientific classification
- Kingdom: Plantae
- Clade: Tracheophytes
- Clade: Angiosperms
- Clade: Monocots
- Order: Asparagales
- Family: Asparagaceae
- Subfamily: Lomandroideae
- Genus: Cordyline
- Species: C. fruticosa

Binomial name
- Cordyline fruticosa (L.) A.Chev.

Synonyms
- Convallaria fruticosa L. Asparagus terminalis L. Cordyline terminalis Kunth; Dracaena terminalis Lam. Dracaena formosa W.Bull Terminalis fruticosa (L.) Kuntze

= Cordyline fruticosa =

Species of plant

Cordyline fruticosa is an evergreen flowering plant in the family Asparagaceae. It is known by a wide variety of common names, including ti plant, palm lily, and cabbage palm.

The plant has been cultivated in Asia and Oceania, with a number of uses including food and traditional medicine. It is of great cultural importance to the traditional inhabitants of the Pacific Islands and Maritime Southeast Asia.

== Description ==
It is a palm-like plant growing up to 4.5 metres (15 feet) tall with an attractive fan-like and spirally arranged cluster of broadly elongated leaves at the tip of the slender trunk. The leaves range from red to green and variegated forms. It is a woody plant with leaves 30–60 centimetres (12–24 inches) (rarely 75 cm or 30 in) long and 5–10 cm (2–4 in) wide at the top of a woody stem. It produces 40–60 cm (16–24 in) long panicles of small scented yellowish to red flowers that mature into red berries.

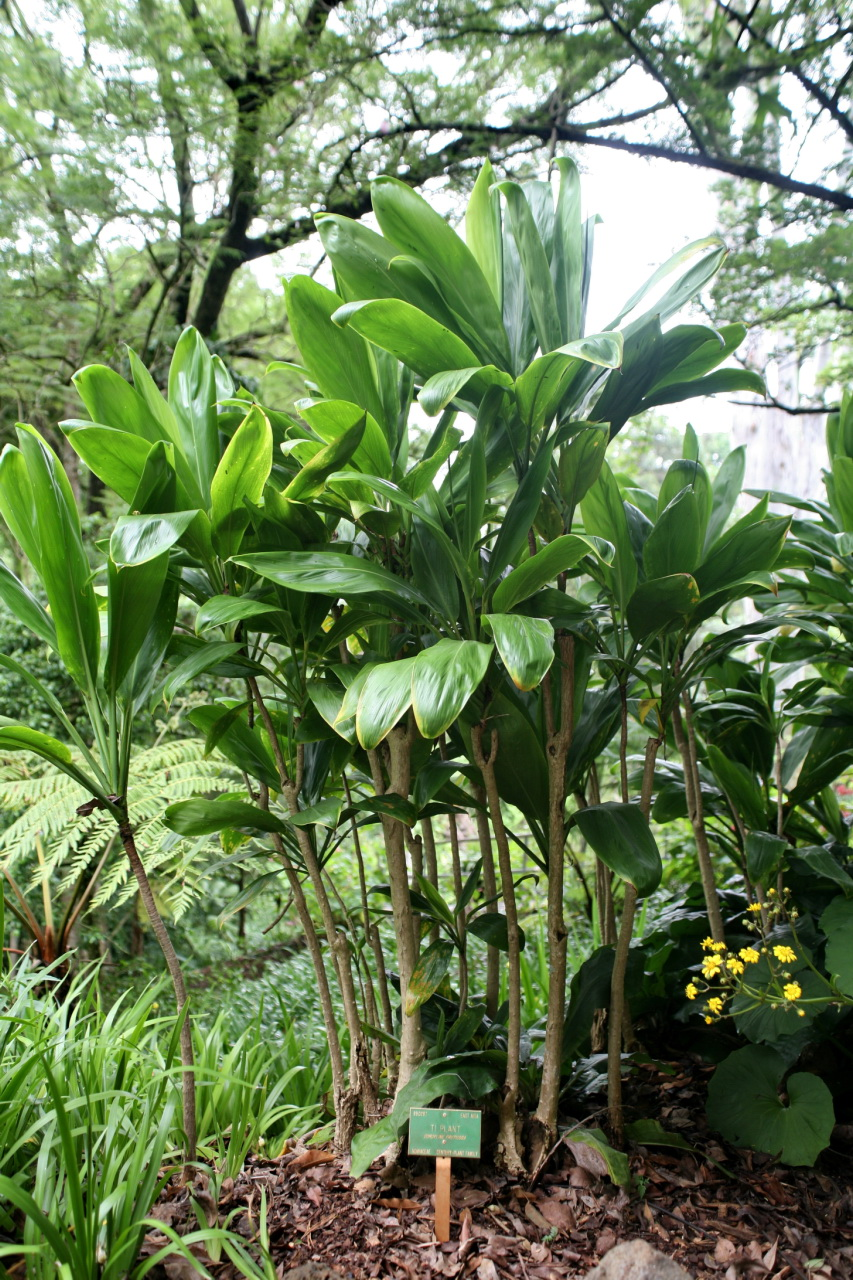
Green specimen

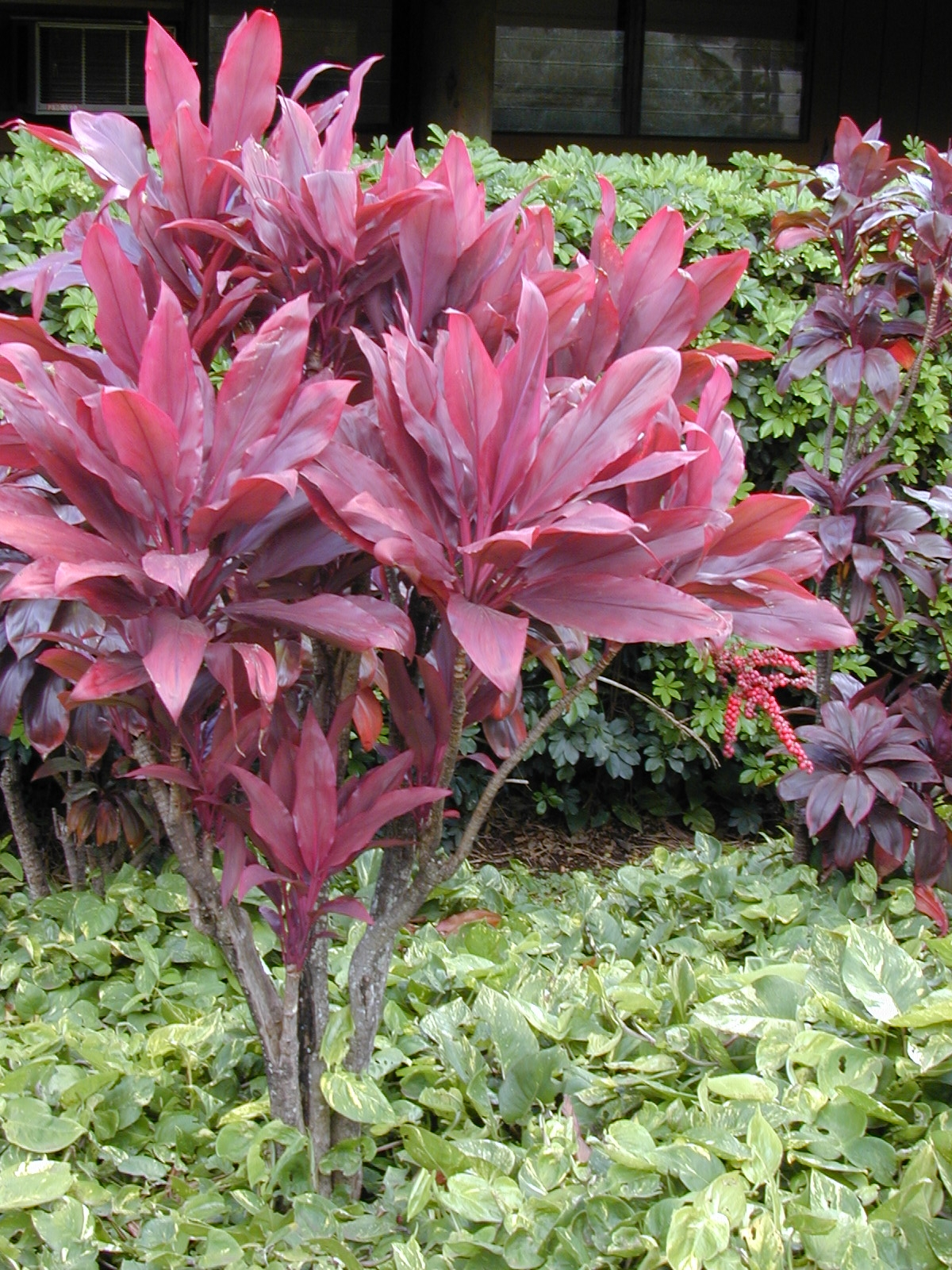
Purple specimen

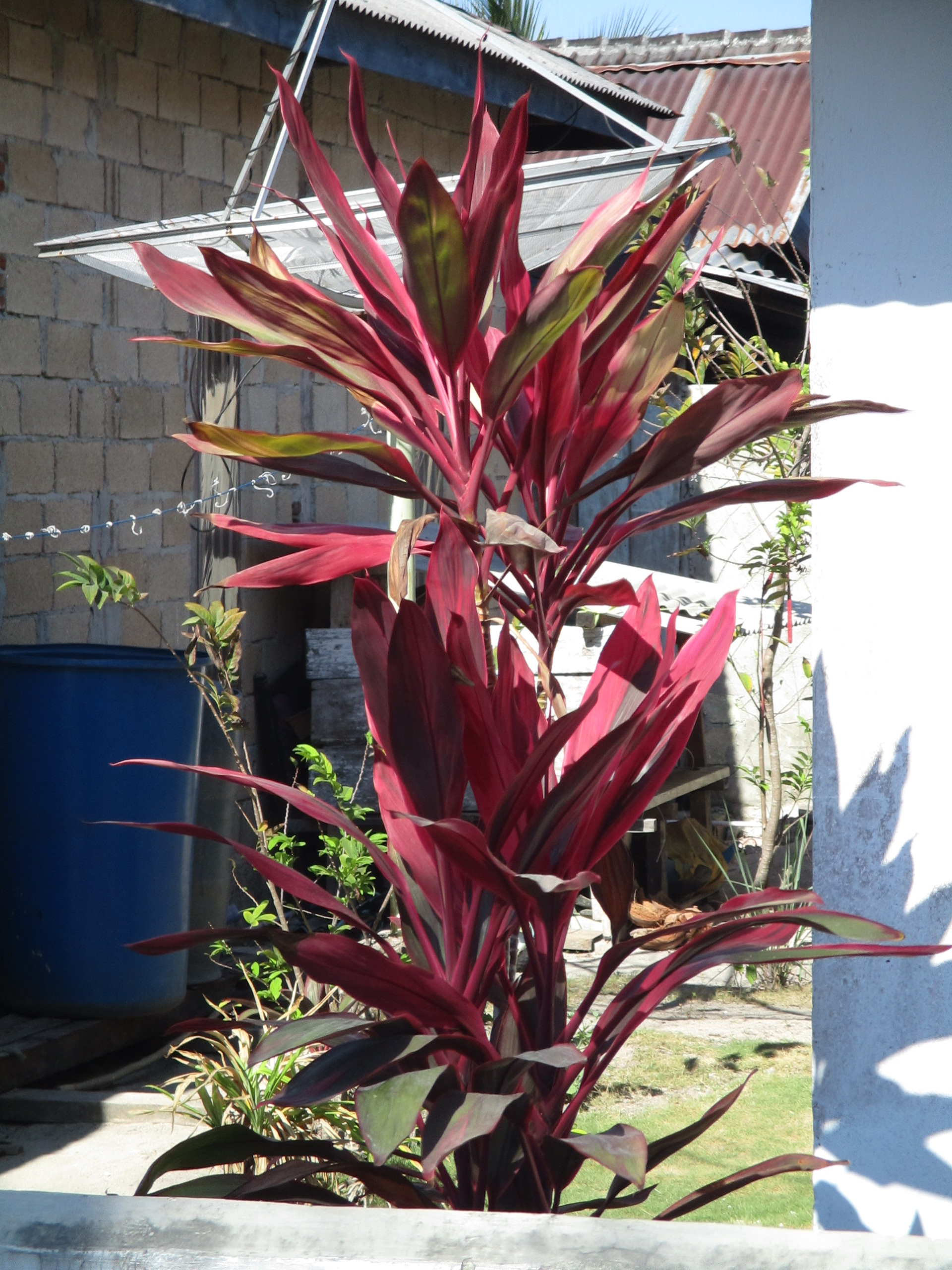
Red specimen in Buton Island

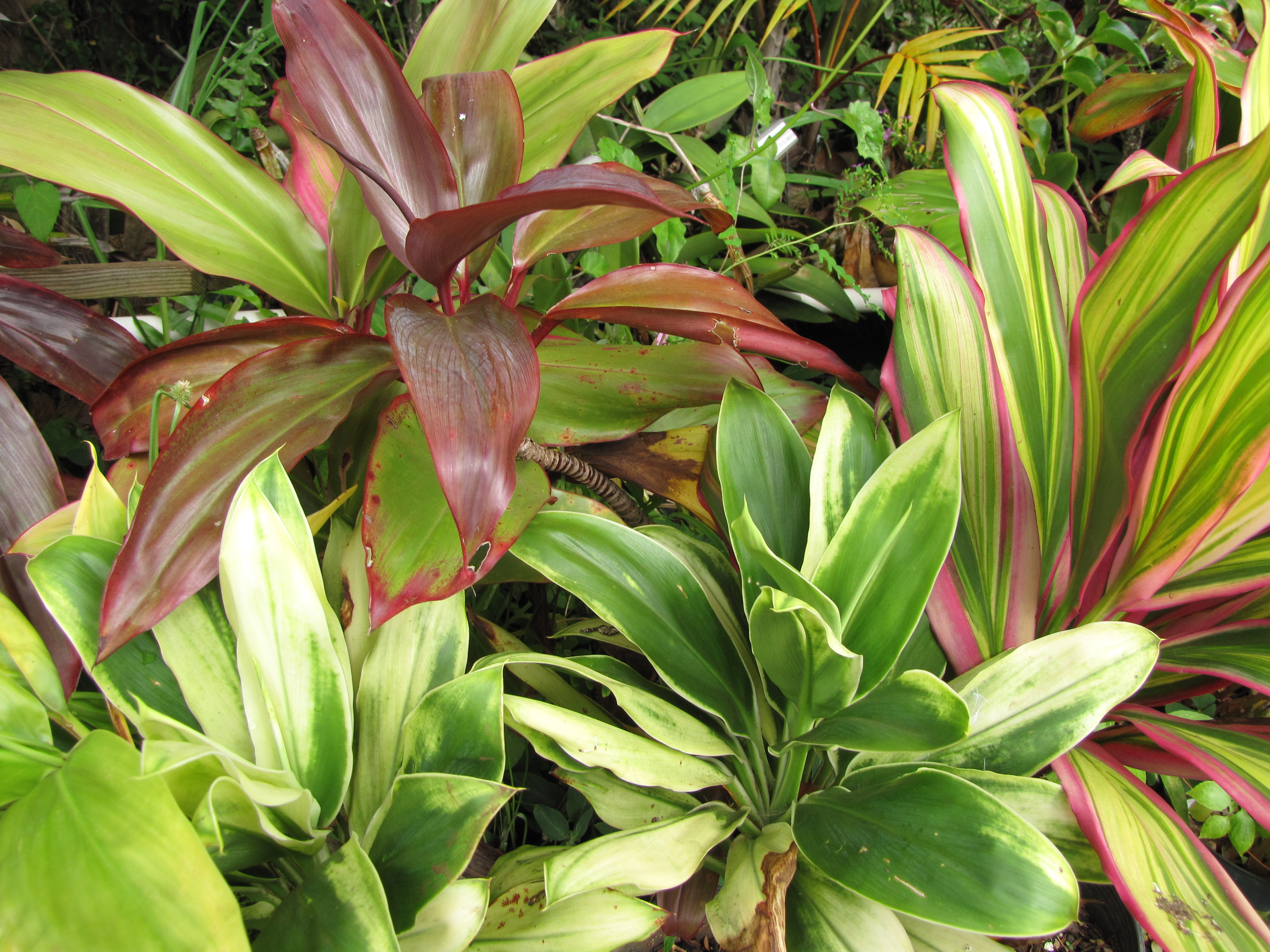
Variegated specimen

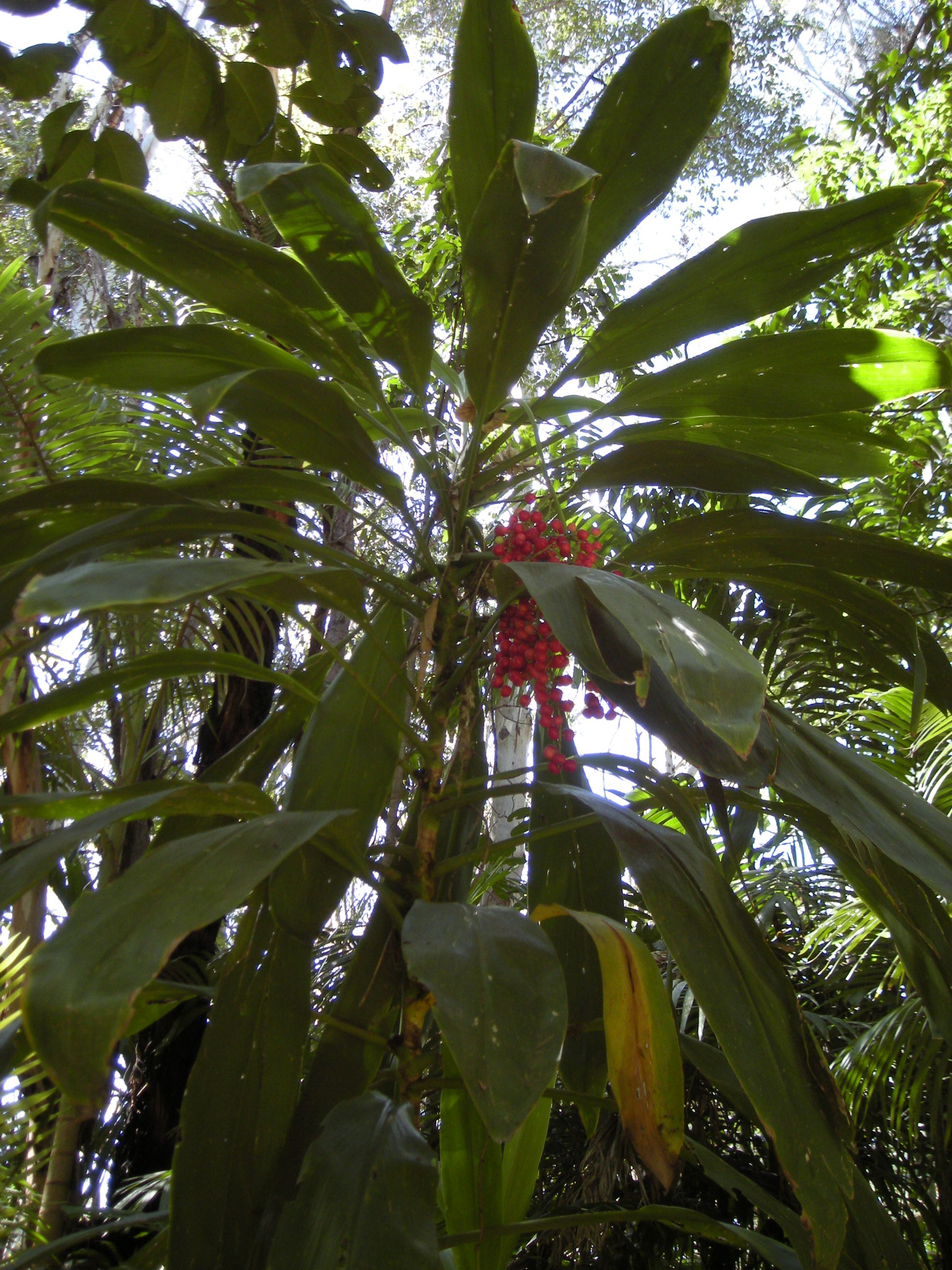
Specimen with fruit

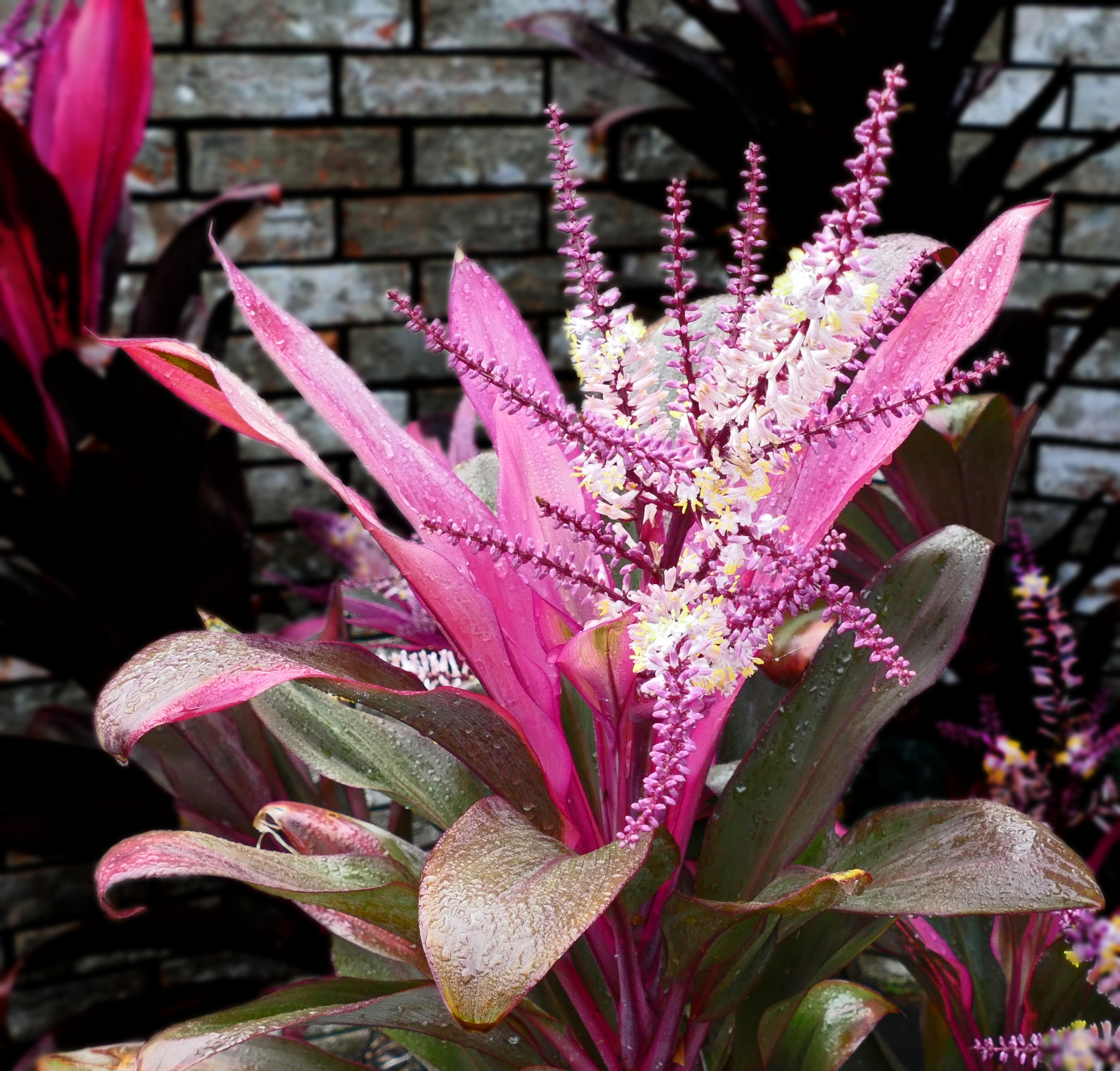
Blossom, Gulf Coast of Texas

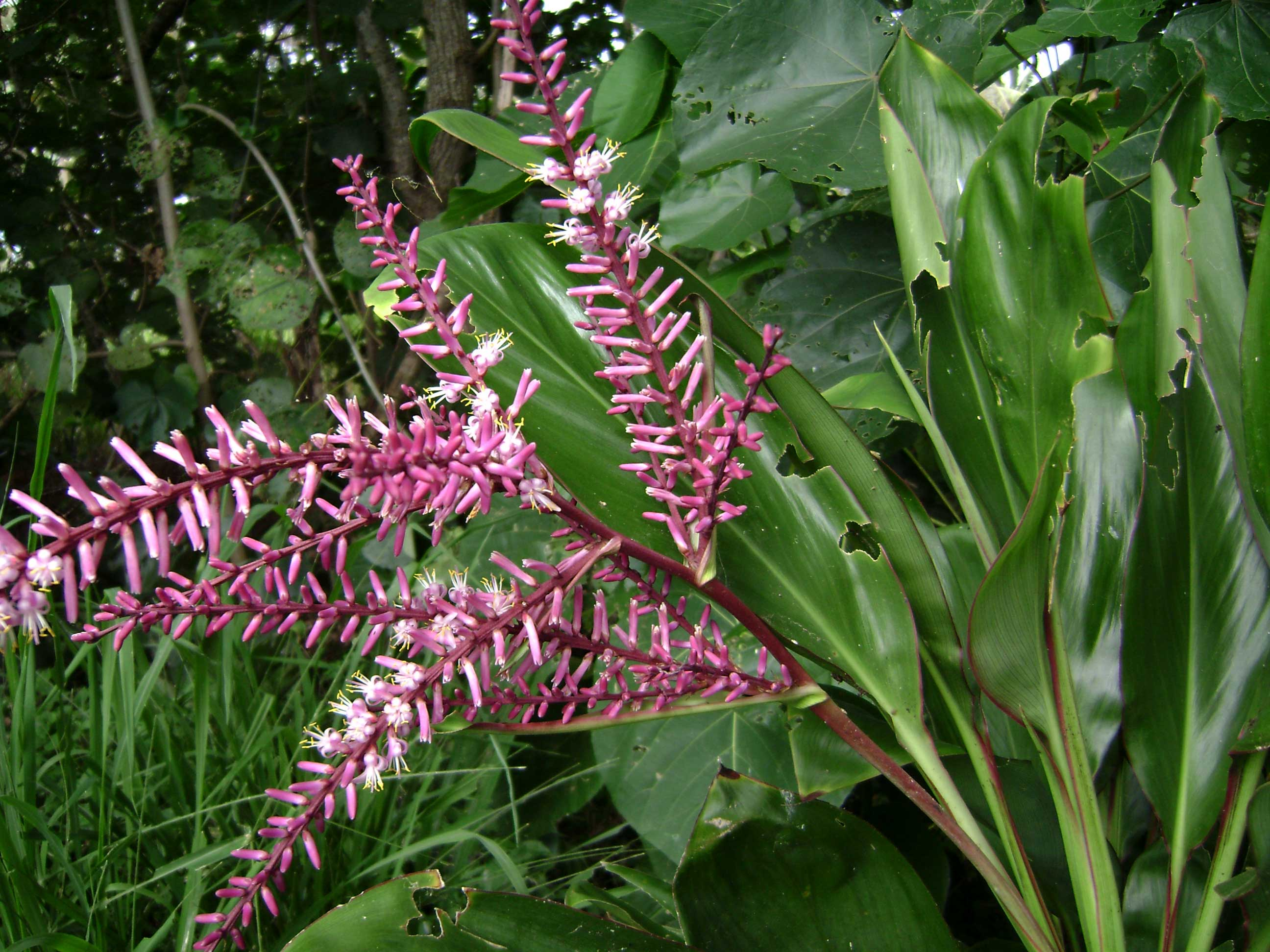
Inflorescence

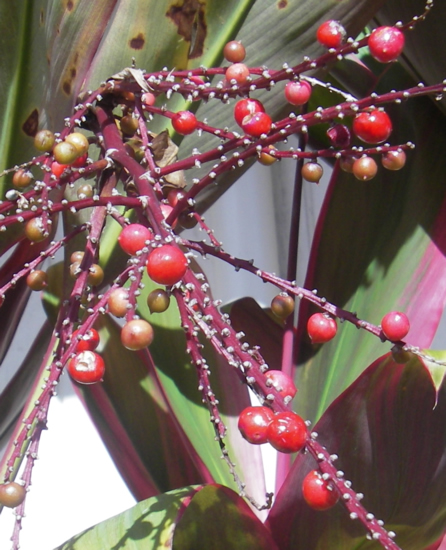
Berries

== Taxonomy ==
Cordyline fruticosa was formerly listed as part of the families Agavaceae and Laxmanniaceae (now both subfamilies of the Asparagaceae in the APG III system).

=== Names ===
The reconstructed Proto-Malayo-Polynesian word for ti plant is *siRi. Cognates include Malagasy síly; Palauan sis; Ere and Kuruti siy; Araki jihi; Arosi diri; Chuukese tii-n; Wuvulu si or ti; Tongan sī; Samoan, Tahitian, and Māori tī; and Hawaiian kī. The names in some languages have also been applied to the botanically unrelated garden crotons (Codiaeum variegatum), which similarly have red or yellow leaves. The cognates of Proto-Western-Malayo-Polynesian *sabaqaŋ, similarly, have been applied to both garden crotons and ti plants.

In the Philippines, they are also known by names derived from the Proto-Austronesian *kilala, "to know", due to its use in divination rituals. Cognates derived from that usage include Tagalog sagilala; and Visayan and Bikol kilála or kilaa, though in Central Visayas, this plant is called ti-as. In New Zealand, the terms for ti were also transferred to the native and closely related cabbage tree (Cordyline australis), as tī kōuka.

== Cultivation ==
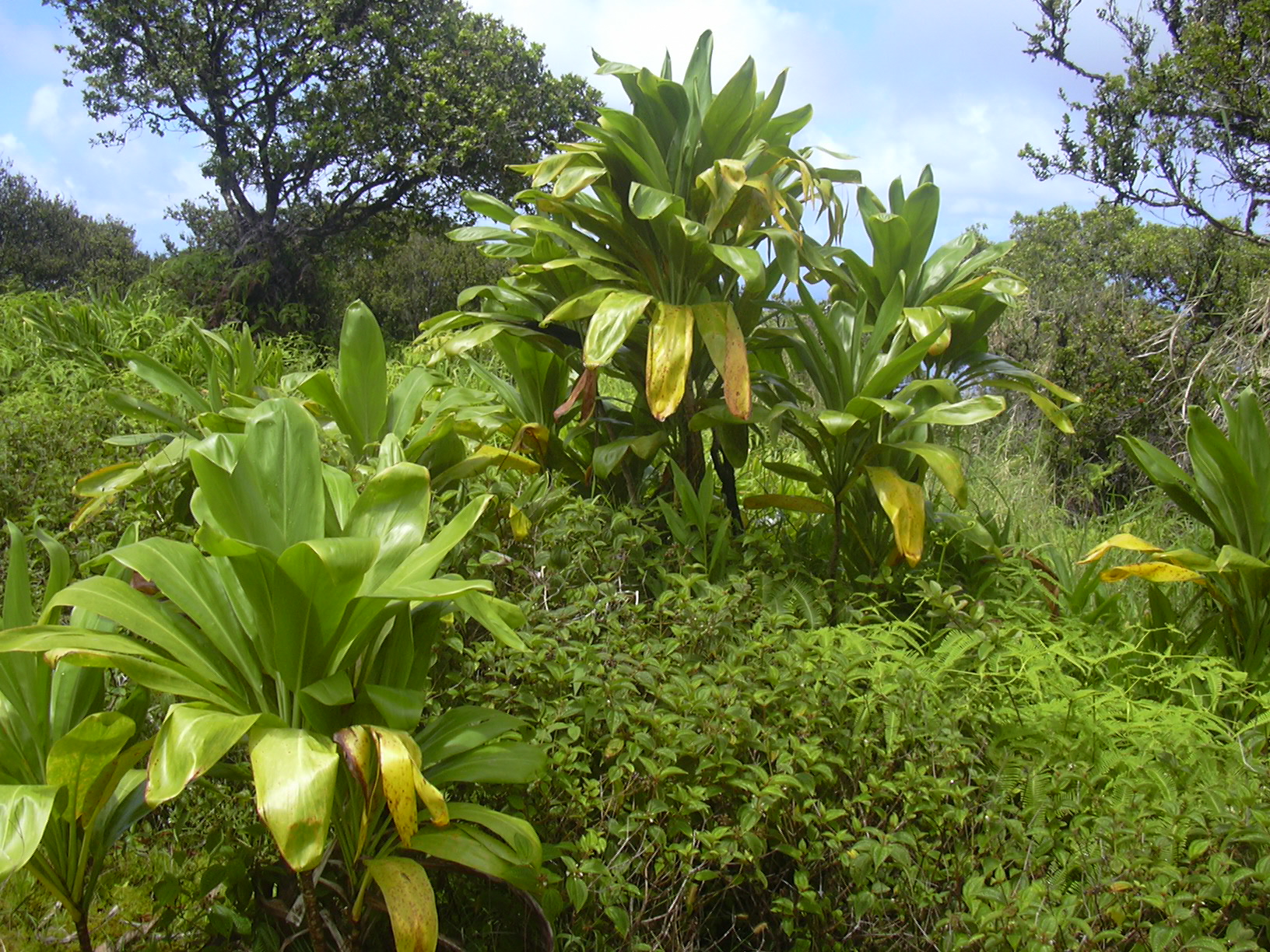
Specimens in Maui

Its original native distribution is unknown, but it is believed to be native to the region from Bangladesh, to Mainland Southeast Asia, South China, Taiwan, Maritime Southeast Asia, New Guinea, and Northern Australia. It has the highest morphological diversity in New Guinea and is believed to have been extensively cultivated there.

It was carried throughout Oceania by Austronesians, reaching as far as Hawaii, New Zealand, and Easter Island at their furthest extent. In New Zealand, it grew only in the far north and is now extinct there, except on the Kermadec Islands. A particularly important type of ti in eastern Polynesia is a large green-leafed cultivar grown for their enlarged edible rhizomes. Unlike the ti populations in Southeast Asia and Near Oceania, this cultivar is almost entirely sterile in the further islands of eastern Polynesia. It can be propagated only by cuttings from the stalks or the rhizomes. It is speculated that this was the result of deliberate artificial selection, probably because they produce larger and less fibrous rhizomes more suitable for use as food.

It was introduced to Europe as a houseplant in 1771.

== Uses ==
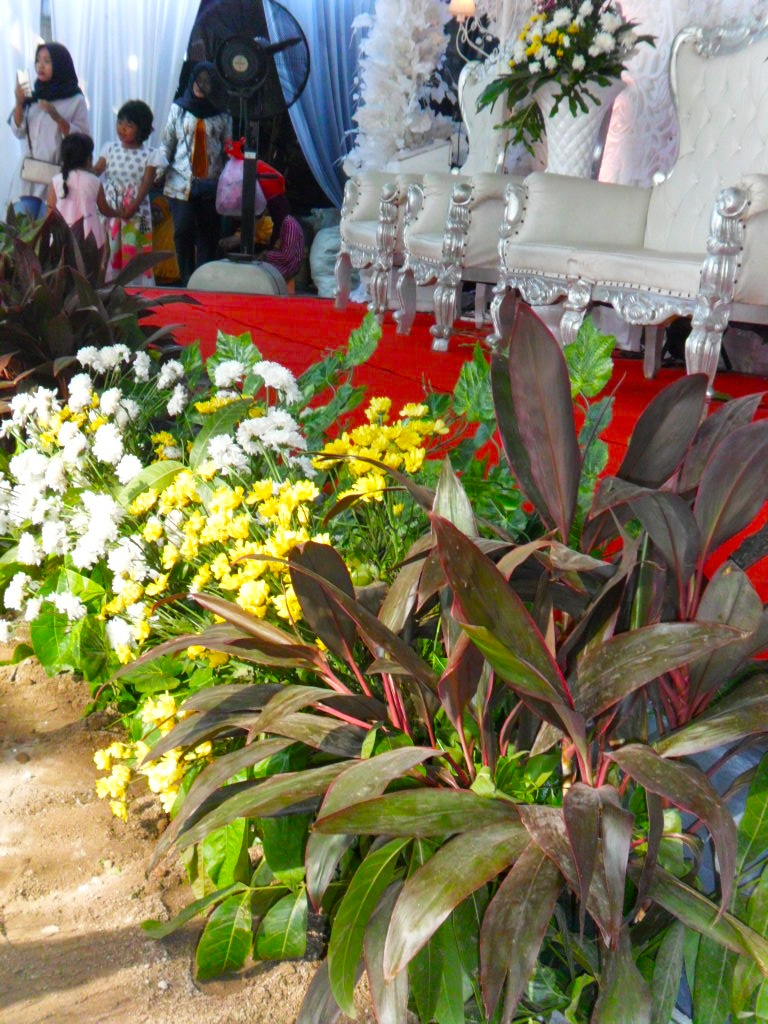
Ti tree as wedding decorations in Cirebon, Javanese culture

The roots and young leaves can be cooked and eaten as survival food. The leaves can make a rain cloak.

In the Philippines, the roots were used to flavor the traditional intus sugarcane wines of the Lumad people of Mindanao.

In Polynesia, the leaves of the green-leafed form are used to wrap food, line earth ovens and fermentation pits of breadfruit, and their rhizomes harvested and processed into a sweet molasses-like pulp eaten like candy or used to produce a honey-like liquid used in various sweet treats. In Hawaii, the roots mixed with water and fermented are also distilled into an alcoholic beverage known as okolehao.

The plants are widely used for traditional medicine, and ornamentation throughout Austronesia and New Guinea. The flowers are a traditional treatment for asthma, and their anthocyanin content has been assessed to see if they might be commercial herbal remedy.

Ti is a popular ornamental plant, with numerous cultivars available, many of them selected for green or reddish or purple foliage.

== Cultural significance ==
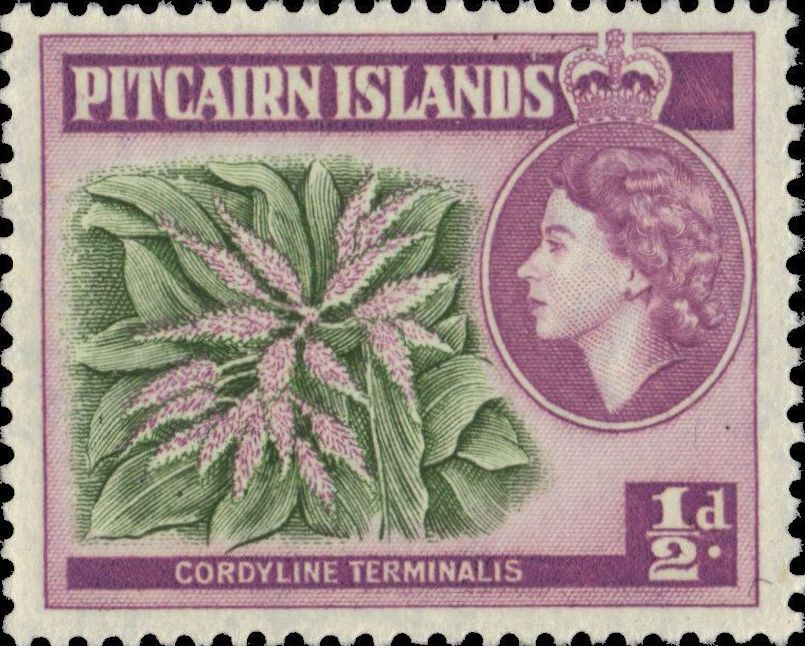
Cordyline fruticosa (under its synonym terminalis) on a Pitcairn stamp

The species is regarded as one of the most important plants related to the indigenous socio-cultural practices of the Pacific and Island Southeast-Asia. In particular, it was propagated throughout the Austronesian linguistic area by humans, not so much for its food value but mainly for socio-cultural reasons. It is widely regarded as having mystical and spiritual importance in various cultures. It is common planted on grave sites, used in magical and ritual practices, including for healing. It is also used as a decorative attire and ornamentation, and as a boundary markers. It is common for the red and green cultivars to be used differently in rituals. Red ti plants commonly symbolize blood, war, and the ties between the living and the dead; while green ti plants commonly symbolize peace and healing. Their ritual uses in Island Southeast Asia have largely been obscured by the introduction of Hinduism, Buddhism, Islam, and Christianity, but they still persist in certain areas or are co-opted for the rituals of the new religions.

In Philippine anitism, ti were commonly used by babaylan (female shamans) when conducting mediumship or healing rituals. A common belief in Filipino cultures is that the plant has the innate ability to host spirits. Among the Ifugao people of Northern Luzon, it is planted around terraces and communities to drive away evil spirits as well as mark boundaries of cultivated fields. The red leaves are believed to be attractive to spirits and is worn during important rituals as part of the headdresses and tucked into armbands. In the past, it was also worn during ceremonial dances called bangibang, which was performed by both men and women for warriors who died in battle or through violent means. They are also used to decorate ritual objects. Among the Palaw'an people, it is planted in burial grounds to prevent the dead from becoming malevolent spirits. In Indonesia, red ti are used similarly as in the Philippines. Among the Dayak, Sundanese, Kayan, Kenyah, Berawan, Iban and Mongondow people, red ti are used as wards against evil spirits and as boundary markers. They are also used in rituals like in healing and funerals and are very commonly planted in sacred groves and around shrines. The Dayak also extract a natural green dye from ti. During healing rituals of the Mentawai people, the life-giving spirit are enticed with songs and offerings to enter ti stems which are then reconciled with the sick person. Among the Sasak people, green ti leaves are used as part of the offerings to spirits by the belian shamans. Among the Baduy people, green ti represent the body, while red ti represent the soul. Both are used in rice planting rituals. They are also planted on burial grounds. Among the Balinese and Karo people, ti plants are planted near village or family shrines in a sacred grove. Among the Toraja people, red ti plants are used in rituals and as decorations of ritual objects. They are believed to occur in both the material and the spirit worlds (a common belief in Austronesian animism). In the spirit world, they exist as fins and tails of spirits. In the material world, they are most useful as guides used to attract the attentions of spirits. The red leaves are also symbolic of blood and thus of life and vitality. Among the Ngaju people, ti plants were symbolic of the sacred groves of ancestors. They were also important in ritual promises dedicated to high gods. They were regarded as symbolic of the masculine "Tree of Life", in a dichotomy against Ficus species which symbolize the feminine "Tree of the Dead".

The consumption of the sacred plant as food by Polynesians was originally taboo, believed to have been a daring innovation of Polynesian cultures as a response to famine conditions. The lifting of the taboo is believed to be tied to the development of the firewalking ritual.

In New Guinea, ti are commonly planted to indicate land ownership for cultivation and are also planted around ceremonial men's houses. They are also used in various rituals and are commonly associated with blood and warfare. Among the Tsembaga Maring people, they are believed to house "red spirits" (spirits of men who died in battle). Prior to a highly ritualized (but lethal) warfare over land ownership, they are uprooted and pigs are sacrificed to the spirits. After the hostilities, they are re-planted in the new land boundaries depending on the outcome of the fight. The men involved ritually place their souls into the plants. The ritual warfare have been suppressed by the Papua New Guinea government, but parts of the rituals still survive. Among the Ankave people, red ti is part of their creation myth, believed as having arisen from the site of the first murder. Among the Mendi and Sulka people they are made into dyes used as body paint, and their leaves are used for body adornments and purification rituals. Among the Nikgini people, the leaves have magical abilities to bring good luck and are used in divination and in decorating ritual objects. Among the Kapauku people, ti plants are regarded as magical plants and are believed to be spiritual beings themselves. Unlike other magical plants which are controlled by other spirits, ti plants had their own spirits and are powerful enough to command other spiritual beings. Red plants are used in white magic rituals, while green plants are used in black magic rituals. They are also commonly used in protection and warding rituals. Among the Baktaman people, red plants are used for initiation rites, while green plants are used for healing. The Ok-speaking peoples also regard ti plants as their collective totem.

In Island Melanesia, ti are regarded as sacred by various Austronesian-speaking peoples and are used in rituals for protection, divination, and fertility. Among the Kwaio people, red ti are associated with feuding and vengeance, while green ti are associated with ancestor spirits, markers of sacred groves, and wards against evil. The Kwaio cultivate these varieties around their communities. Among the Maenge people of New Britain, ti leaves are worn as everyday skirts by women. The color and size of leaves can vary by personal preference and fashion. New cultivars with different colors are traded regularly and strands of ti are grown near the village. Red leaves can only worn by women past puberty. Ti is also the most important plant in magic and healing rituals of the Maenge. Some ti cultivars are associated with supernatural spirits and have names and folklore around them. In Vanuatu, Cordyline leaves, known locally by the Bislama name nanggaria, are worn tucked into a belt in traditional dances like Māʻuluʻulu, with different varieties having particular symbolic meanings. Cordylines are often planted outside nakamal buildings. In Fiji, red ti leaves are used as skirts for dancers and are used in rituals dedicated to the spirits of the dead. They are also planted around ceremonial buildings used for initiation rituals.

In Micronesia, ti leaves are buried under newly built houses in Pohnpei to ward of malign sorcery. In instances of an unknown death, shamans in Micronesia communicate with the dead spirit through ti plants, naming various causes of death until the plant trembles. There is also archaeological evidence that the rhizomes of the plants were eaten in the past in Guam prior to the Latte Period.

In Polynesia, green ti were cultivated widely for food and religious purposes. They are commonly planted around homes, in sacred places (including marae and heiau), and in grave sites. The leaves are also carried as a charm when traveling and the leaves are used in rituals that communicate with the species. Like in Southeast Asia, they are widely believed to protect against evil spirits and bad luck; as well as having the ability to host spirits of dead people, as well as nature spirits.

In ancient Hawaiʻi the plant was thought to have great spiritual power; only kahuna (shamans) and aliʻi (chiefs) were able to wear leaves around their necks during certain ritual activities. Ti was sacred to the god of fertility and agriculture Lono, and the goddess of the forest and the hula dance, Laka. Ti leaves were also used to make lei, and to outline borders between properties it was also planted at the corners of the home to keep evil spirits away. To this day some Hawaiians plant tī near their houses to bring good luck. The leaves are also used for lava sledding. A number of leaves are lashed together and people ride down hills on them. The leaves were also used to make items of clothing including skirts worn in dance performances. The Hawaiian hula skirt is a dense skirt with an opaque layer of at least fifty green leaves and the bottom (top of the leaves) shaved flat. The Tongan dance dress, the sisi, is an apron of about 20 leaves, worn over a tupenu, and decorated with some yellow or red leaves.

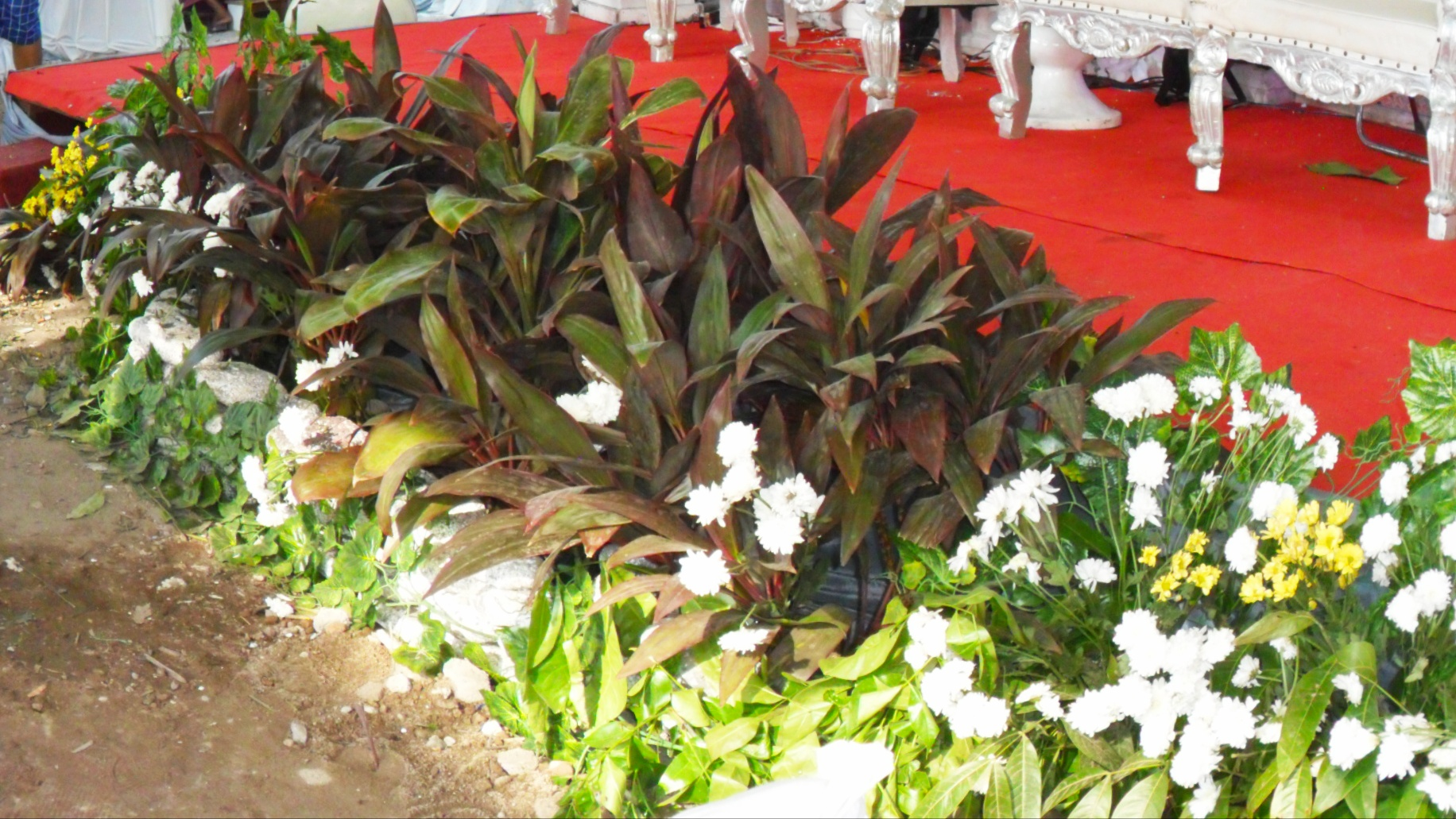
Ti plants as wedding decoration in Cirebon

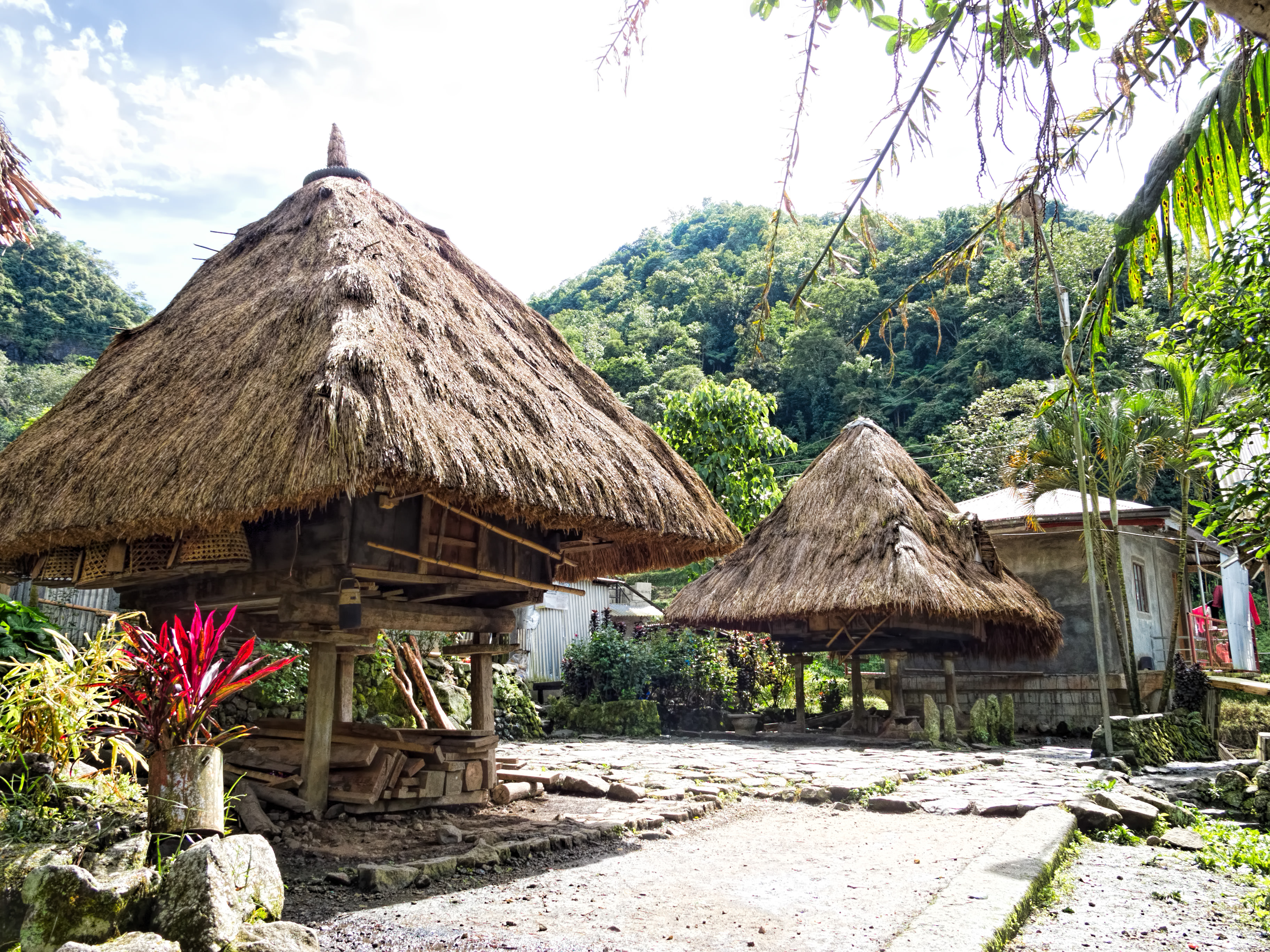
Red ti planted alongside traditional houses of the Ifugao people in the Banaue Rice Terraces, Philippines

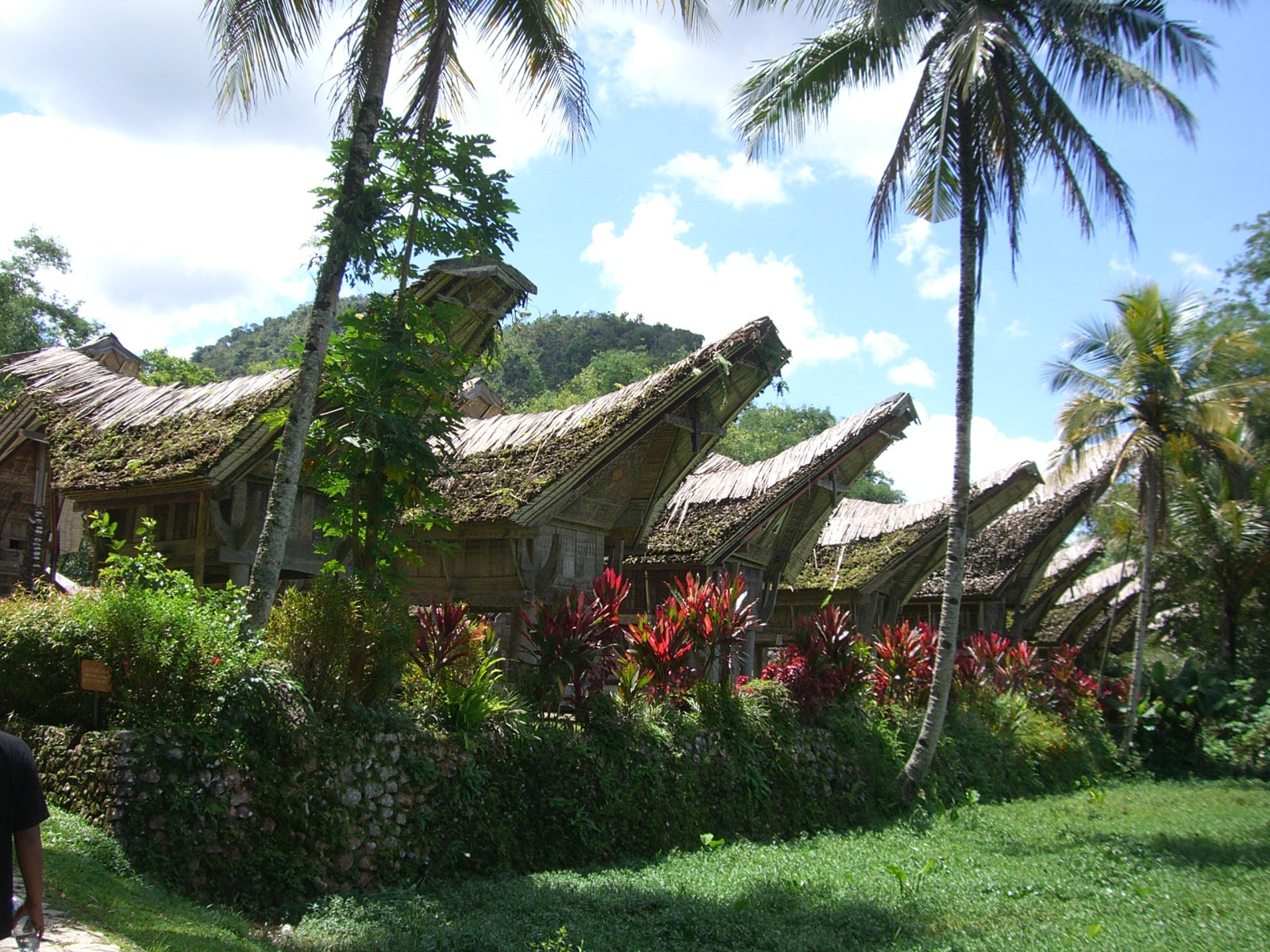
Red ti planted around traditional Toraja houses in Tana Toraja, Sulawesi

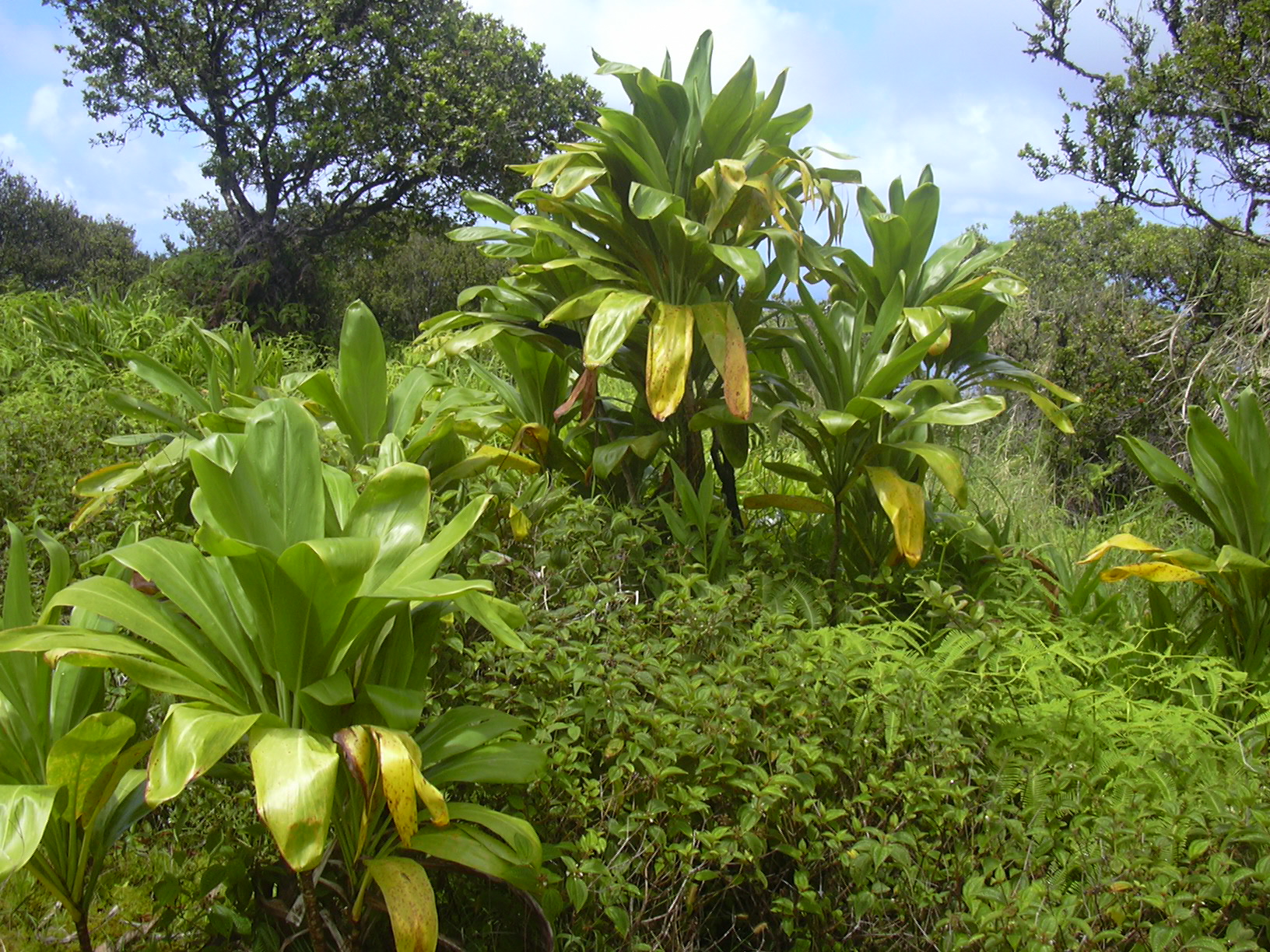
Feral green ti plants in Maui

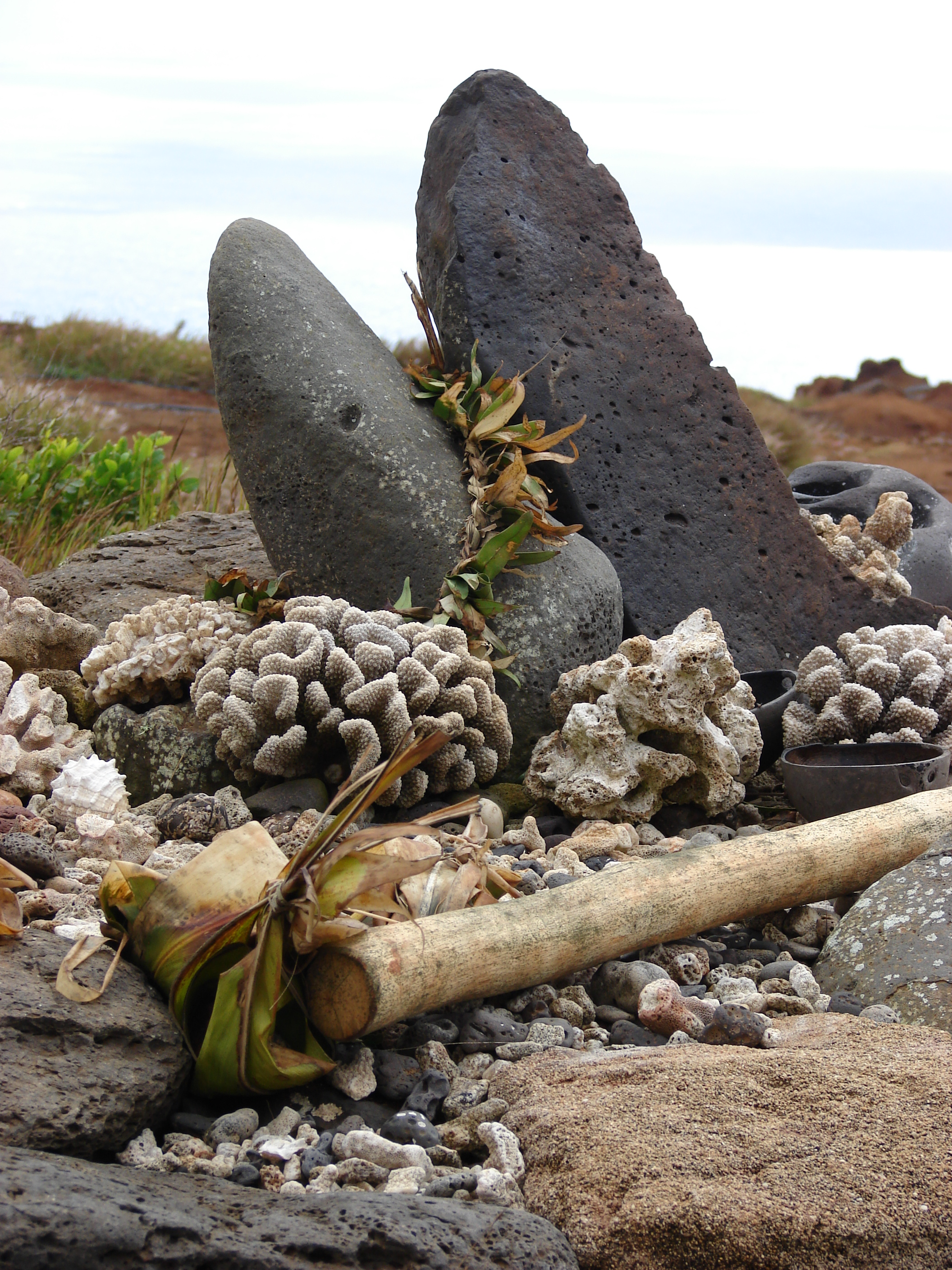
Offerings of stone and bundles of ti leaves (puʻolo) in the Puʻu Moaulanui heiau (temple) in the summit of Kahoʻolawe, Hawaii

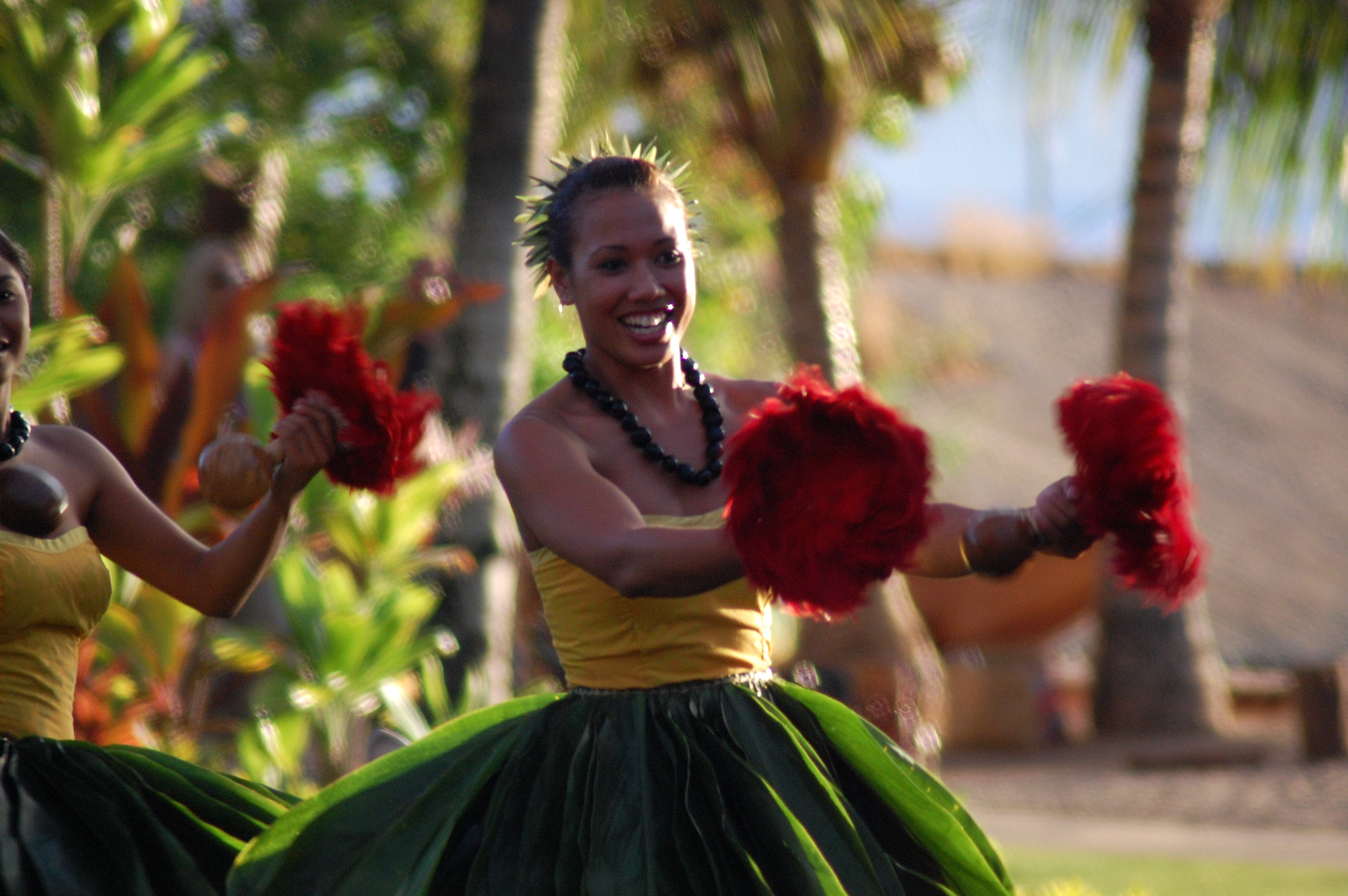
Hula dancers in a Luau in Lāhainā, in traditional kī leaf skirts

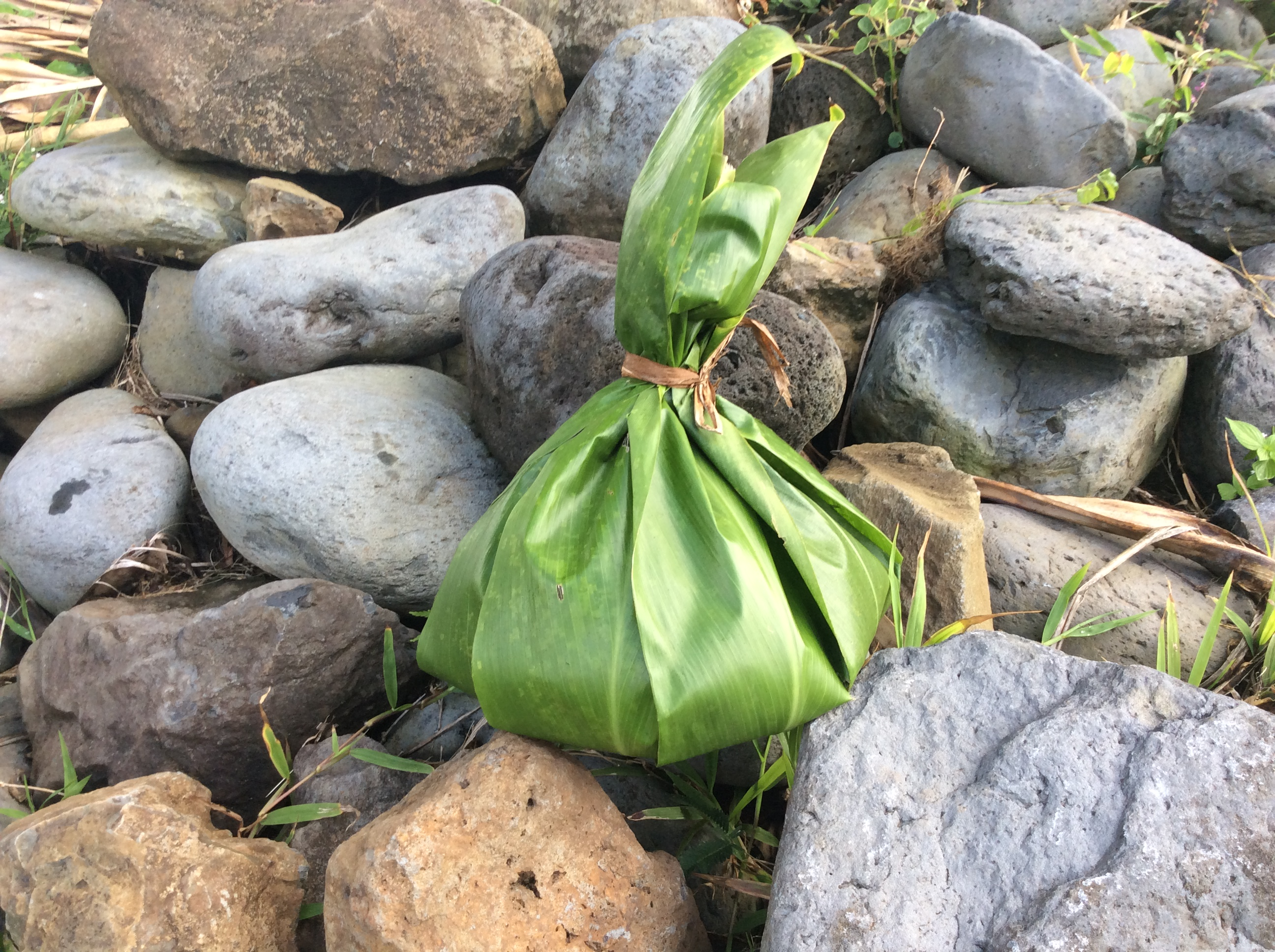
Ti leaf bundles (puʻolo) used as offerings to spirits in Hawaii

== See also ==
- Domesticated plants and animals of Austronesia
- Samoan plant names
