= Hus language =

Austronesian language of Papua New Guinea

Andra-Hus
- Native to: Papua New Guinea
- Region: Manus Island
- Native speakers: 1,500 (2020)
- Language family: Austronesian: Malayo-Polynesian; Oceanic; Admiralty Islands; Eastern Admiralty Islands; Manus; East Manus; Andra-Hus

Language codes
- ISO 639-3: anx
- Glottolog: andr1248

Andra-Hus is an Austronesian language spoken on the islands of the same name, off the northern coast of Manus Island, New Guinea.
