= Titan language =

Austronesian language of Papua New Guinea

Titan
- Manus
- Native to: Papua New Guinea
- Region: Manus & neighboring islands
- Native speakers: (5,100 cited 2000)
- Language family: Austronesian: Malayo-Polynesian; Oceanic; Admiralty Islands; Eastern Admiralty Islands; Manus; East Manus; Titan

Language codes
- ISO 639-3: ttv
- Glottolog: tita1241

Titan, also known as Manus, is an East Manus language of the Austronesian language family spoken in the southeastern part of Manus Island, New Guinea, and neighboring islands by about 4,000 people.

Titan has a bilabial trill and prenasalized consonants, as in [ⁿrakeiʔin] 'girls' and [ᵐʙutukei] 'wooden plate'.

== Phonology ==
Phonology of the Titan language:

Consonant sounds
	Labial		Alveolar	Palatal	Velar	Glottal
	plain	lab.	Alveolar	Palatal	Velar	Glottal
Plosive	p	(pʷ)	t	c	k	(ʔ)
Nasal	m	(mʷ)	n	ɲ	ŋ	
Fricative	v		s			h
Prenasalized Trill	ᵐʙ		ⁿdr			
Trill			r			
Lateral			l			
Approximant	w			j		

Consonant sounds in parentheses are only inferred to exist in Titan, or to exist in other dialects of Titan.

Vowel sounds
	Front	Central	Back
High	i		u
High	ɪ		u
Mid	e		o
Low		a	

An /e/ sound may also be interchangeable with an open-mid sound /ɛ/.
