= Nali language =

Oceanic language spoken in Papua New Guinea

Nali
- Native to: Papua New Guinea
- Region: Manus
- Native speakers: (1,800 cited 1982)
- Language family: Austronesian: Malayo-Polynesian; Oceanic; Admiralty Islands; Eastern Admiralty Islands; Manus; East Manus; Nali
- Dialects: Okro

Language codes
- ISO 639-3: nss
- Glottolog: nali1245

Nali is an Austronesian language spoken on Manus Island, Papua New Guinea. The Okro dialect is distinct.
