= Manus languages =

Oceanic language subgroup of Papua New Guinea

Manus
- Geographic distribution: Manus Province, Papua New Guinea
- Linguistic classification: Austronesian: Malayo-Polynesian; Oceanic; Admiralty Islands; Eastern Admiralty Islands; Manus

Language codes
- ISO 639-3: –
- Glottolog: manu1262

The Manus languages are a subgroup of about two dozen Oceanic languages located on Manus Island and nearby offshore islands in Manus Province of Papua New Guinea. The exact number of languages is difficult to determine because they form a dialect continuum (Blust 2007:302). The name Manus (or Moanus) originally designated an ethnic group whose members spoke closely related languages and whose coastal dwellers tended to build their houses on stilts out over the sea (Bowern 2011:6).

Nowadays the whole population of Manus Province may call themselves 'Manus' people, so the original Manus are distinguished as Manus tru 'real Manus' (or 'Manus sensu stricto'). The language of the Manus people most intensively studied by anthropologists, from Georg Thilenius in the early 1900s through Margaret Mead in the mid-1900s, is now called Titan (Bowern 2011).

== Languages ==
According to Lynch, Ross, & Crowley (2002), the structure of the family is:

- Manus
  - West Manus: Nyindrou, Sori-Harengan, Hermit (†), Bipi; Mondropolon, Tulu-Bohuai, Khehek (Drehet, Levei), Likum
  - Intermediate: Loniu–Mokerang, Pak-Tong
  - East Manus: Andra-Hus, Elu, Leipon, Papitalai, Ponam, Ere–Kele–Kurti, Koro–Lele–Nali–Titan

One very distinctive phonological trait of these languages is the presence of prenasalized trills (Blust 2007). The bilabial trill [ᵐʙ], which can be spelled mb or br, only occurs before /u/, and sounds like [p] in other environments. The alveolar trill [ⁿr], spelled ndr or dr, has no such distributional limitations (2007:303).
