= Mokerang =

Mokerang may be,

- Mokerang language
- Mokerang Airfield, former WW2 airfield on the northwest tip of Los Negros Island
- Mokerang Village, village on northwest part of Los Negros Island
- Mokerang Peninsula, peninsula of Los Negros Island
