= Hermit language =

Extinct West Manus language of Papua New Guinea

Hermit
- Native to: Papua New Guinea
- Region: Hermit, Luf and Maron Islands, western Manus Province
- Extinct: Early 1990s
- Language family: Austronesian: Malayo-Polynesian; Oceanic; Admiralty Islands; Eastern Admiralty Islands; Manus; West Manus; Hermit
- Writing system: Unwritten

Language codes
- ISO 639-3: llf
- Glottolog: herm1237
- Hermit is classified as Critically Endangered by the UNESCO Atlas of the World's Languages in Danger.

The Hermit language is a critically endangered West Manus language formerly spoken on Hermit, Luf and Maron Islands in western Manus Province, Papua New Guinea. It has been replaced by Seimat.
