= Ere language =

Austronesian language of Papua New Guinea

Ere
- Nane
- Native to: Papua New Guinea
- Region: Manus Island
- Native speakers: (1,400 cited 2000 census)
- Language family: Austronesian: Malayo-Polynesian; Oceanic; Admiralty Islands; Eastern Admiralty Islands; Manus; East Manus; Ere

Language codes
- ISO 639-3: twp
- Glottolog: eree1241

Ere is an Austronesian language spoken on the south coast of Manus Island in Papua New Guinea.
