= Ponam =

Ponam may be,

- Ponam Island
  - Ponam language, spoken on the island

== See also ==
- PONAM
