= Ponam language =

Austronesian language of Papua New Guinea

Ponam
- Native to: Papua New Guinea
- Region: Ponam Island, off Manus Island
- Native speakers: 560 (2018)
- Language family: Austronesian: Malayo-Polynesian; Oceanic; Admiralty Islands; Eastern Admiralty Islands; Manus; East Manus; Ponam

Language codes
- ISO 639-3: ncc
- Glottolog: pona1250

Ponam is an Austronesian language spoken on Ponam Island, just off Manus Island in Papua New Guinea.
