= Gele language =

Gele may be:

- Fongoro language (Chad)
- Kele language (New Guinea)
