= Nyindrou language =

West Manus language spoken in Papua New Guinea

Nyindrou
- Native to: Papua New Guinea
- Region: westernmost Manus Island, Manus Province
- Native speakers: (4,200 cited 1998)
- Language family: Austronesian: Malayo-Polynesian; Oceanic; Admiralty Islands; Eastern Admiralty Islands; Manus; West Manus; Nyindrou

Language codes
- ISO 639-3: lid
- Glottolog: nyin1250

The Nyindrou language is a West Manus language spoken by approximately 4200 people in the westernmost part of Manus Island, Manus Province of Papua New Guinea. It has SVO word order.

== Phonology ==
Phoneme inventory of the Nyindrou language:

Consonant sounds
		Bilabial		Alveolar	Palatal	Velar		Glottal
		plain	lab.	Alveolar	Palatal	plain	lab.	Glottal
Nasal		m	mʷ	n	ɲ			
Plosive	voiceless	p	pʷ	t		k		ʔ
Plosive	voiced	b	bʷ	d		g	ɡʷ	ʔ
Fricative				s				h
Affricate				ⁿdɾ	dʑ			
Liquid	rhotic			ɾ				
Liquid	lateral			l				
Semivowel					j		w	

Vowel sounds
	Front	Back
High	i	u
Mid	e	o
Low		ɑ
