= Leipon language =

Oceanic language spoken in Papua New Guinea

Leipon
- Native to: Papua New Guinea
- Region: off Manus Island
- Native speakers: (650 cited 1977)
- Language family: Austronesian: Malayo-Polynesian; Oceanic; Admiralty Islands; Eastern Admiralty Islands; Manus; East Manus; Leipon

Language codes
- ISO 639-3: lek
- Glottolog: leip1237

Leipon, or Pityilu, is an Austronesian language spoken on Hauwai, Ndrilo, and Pityilu islands, just off Manus Island in Papua New Guinea.
