= Little Ndrova Island =

Island of Papua New Guinea

Coordinates: 2.223658°S 147.21885°E

- Interactive map of Little Ndrova Island

Administration
- Papua New Guinea
- Capital city: Port Moresby
- Largest settlement: Port Moresby
- Prime Minister: James Marape

Little Ndrova Island, also called Ndawara Islet, is an island of Manus Province, Papua New Guinea, one of the Admiralty Islands.
