= Kele language (New Guinea) =

Manus language of Papua New Guinea

Kele
- Native to: Papua New Guinea
- Region: Manus Island
- Native speakers: 1,500 (2020)
- Language family: Austronesian: Malayo-Polynesian; Oceanic; Admiralty Islands; Eastern Admiralty Islands; Manus; East Manus; Kele

Language codes
- ISO 639-3: sbc
- Glottolog: kele1258

Kele or Gele’ is a language spoken in the easterly section of inland Manus Island, New Guinea. Its name comes from the Kele word for "there".

== Phonology ==
The syllable structure of Kele is (C)V(C).

Consonants
| | | Labial | | Alveolar | Velar | | Glottal |
| | | plain | labialized | Alveolar | plain | labialized | Glottal |
|---|---|---|---|---|---|---|---|
| Nasal | | m | mʷ | n | ŋ | ŋʷ | |
| Stop | voiceless | p | pʷ | t | k | kʷ | ʔ |
| Stop | voiced | b | | d | | | |
| Fricative | | | | s | | | h |
| Approximant | | | | j | | w | |
| Rhotic | | | | r | | | |
| Lateral | | | | l | | | |

/b d/ are often trilled [bʙ dr]. Additionally, /b d/ are prenasalized when not occurring before another consonant.

Kele has five vowels: a, e, i, o and u. Vowels can also be elongated. Ross (2002) describes this vowel length as non-phonemic, and instead as part of one of four different disyllabic patterns in words. He also notes that no word contains more than one long vowel.

== Grammar ==
Kele has eleven pronouns, distinguishing first person inclusive and exclusive pronouns as well as dual and plural number. Different versions of each pronoun can be prefixed to show the subject and suffixed to show possession. Nearly all verbs require a preceding subject prefix; however, a few verbs instead require a possessor suffix to indicate the subject.

== Sample vocabulary ==
=== Nouns ===
Sample Nouns in Kele
| Word | Gloss |
|---|---|
| petlé | bed |
| sal | road |
| um | house |
| pat | stone |

=== Verbs ===
Sample Verbs in Kele
| Word | Gloss |
|---|---|
| penow | learn |
| te-penow | teach |
| mat | die |
| te-mete-i | kill |
