= Lou language =

Lou may be:

- Lou language (Torricelli)
- Lou language (Austronesian)
