= Pak-Tong =

Pak-Tong may be,

- Pak-Tong language
- paktong (nickel silver)
