= Elu language (Papua New Guinea) =

Austronesian language of Papua New Guinea

Elu
- Native to: Papua New Guinea
- Region: Manus Island
- Native speakers: 570 (2011)
- Language family: Austronesian: Malayo-Polynesian; Oceanic; Admiralty Islands; Eastern Admiralty Islands; Manus; East Manus; Elu

Language codes
- ISO 639-3: elu
- Glottolog: eluu1241
- ELP: Elu

Elu is an Austronesian language spoken on the northern coast of Manus Island, New Guinea. The usage of the language has been in decline in recent years.
