= Lele language =

Lele is the name of at least six different languages:

- Lele language (Bantu), a Bantu language
- Lele language (Chad), an Afro-Asiatic language
- Lele language (Guinea), a Mande language
- Lele language (Papua New Guinea), an Austronesian language
- Lyélé language or Lélé of Burkina Faso, a Gurunsi language
- Tiagba language or Lélé of Ivory Coast, a Kru language
