= Elu language =

Elu language may refer to:

- Elu, a Middle Indo-Aryan language, or Prakrit
- Elu language (Papua New Guinea) (ISO 639: elu), an Austronesian language
