= Penchal language =

Oceanic language spoken in Papua New Guinea

Penchal
- Native to: Papua New Guinea
- Region: Rambutyo Island, Manus Province
- Native speakers: (550 cited 1982)
- Language family: Austronesian: Malayo-Polynesian; Oceanic; Admiralty Islands; Eastern Admiralty Islands; Southeastern islands; Penchal

Language codes
- ISO 639-3: pek
- Glottolog: penc1239

Penchal is an Oceanic language of Manus Province, Papua New Guinea.
