= Lenkau language =

Oceanic language

Lenkau
- Native to: Papua New Guinea
- Region: Rambutyo Island, Manus Province
- Native speakers: (250 cited 1982)
- Language family: Austronesian: Malayo-Polynesian; Oceanic; Admiralty Islands; Eastern Admiralty Islands; Southeastern islands; Lenkau

Language codes
- ISO 639-3: ler
- Glottolog: lenk1247
- ELP: Lenkau
- Coordinates: 2.341166°S 147.716064°E

Lenkau is an Oceanic language spoken in a single village on Rambutyo Island in Manus Province, Papua New Guinea. It is spoken in Lenkau village (2.341166°S 147.716064°E), Rapatona Rural LLG.
