= Rapatona Rural LLG =

Local-level government in Papua New Guinea

- Country: Papua New Guinea
- Province: Manus Province
- Time zone: UTC+10 (AEST)

Rapatona Rural LLG is a local-level government (LLG) of Manus Province, Papua New Guinea.

== Wards ==
- 01. Mokarah
- 02. Hahai
- 03. Tong
- 04. Nauna (Nauna language speakers)
- 05. Polobuli
- 06. Kuluo
- 07. Penchal
- 08. Lenkau (Lenkau language speakers)
- 09. Mouklen
