= Lele language (Papua New Guinea) =

Oceanic language spoken in Papua New Guinea

Lele
- Native to: Papua New Guinea
- Region: northeastern Manus Island, Manus Province
- Native speakers: 3,181 (2015)
- Language family: Austronesian: Malayo-Polynesian; Oceanic; Admiralty Islands; Eastern Admiralty Islands; Manus; East Manus; Lele

Language codes
- ISO 639-3: lle
- Glottolog: lele1270

Lele is an East Manus language of the Austronesian language family spoken in the northeastern part of Manus Island, New Guinea. It has an SVO word order.
