= Kurti language =

Oceanic language spoken in Papua New Guinea

Kurti
- Ndrukul
- Native to: Papua New Guinea
- Region: Manus Island
- Native speakers: 3,000 (2002)
- Language family: Austronesian: Malayo-Polynesian; Oceanic; Admiralty Islands; Eastern Admiralty Islands; Manus; East Manus; Kurti

Language codes
- ISO 639-3: ktm
- Glottolog: kurt1250

Kurti is an Austronesian language spoken on the north coast of Manus Island in Papua New Guinea.
