= Pak-Tong language =

Oceanic language spoken in Papua New Guinea

Pak-Tong
- Native to: Papua New Guinea
- Region: Manus Province
- Native speakers: (970 cited 1977)
- Language family: Austronesian: Malayo-Polynesian; Oceanic; Admiralty Islands; Eastern Admiralty Islands; Pak-Tong

Language codes
- ISO 639-3: pkg
- Glottolog: pakt1239

Pak-Tong (or Tong-Pak) is an Oceanic language of the Pak and Tong islands of Manus Province, Papua New Guinea.
