= Lorengau Urban LLG =

Local-level government in Papua New Guinea

- Country: Papua New Guinea
- Province: Manus Province
- Time zone: UTC+10 (AEST)

Lorengau Urban LLG is a local-level government (LLG) of Manus Province, Papua New Guinea.

== Wards ==
- 80. Lorengau Urban

== Bibliography ==
- OCHA FISS (2018). "Papua New Guinea administrative level 0, 1, 2, and 3 population statistics and gazetteer". Humanitarian Data Exchange. 1.31.9.
- United Nations in Papua New Guinea (2018). "Papua New Guinea Village Coordinates Lookup". Humanitarian Data Exchange. 1.31.9.
