= Lorengau =

Town in Manus, Papua New Guinea

Lorengau Baimendruwei Yundret
- Lorengau Town
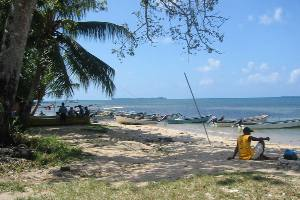
- Lorengau beach on Seeadler harbour
- Nickname: Baimendruwei
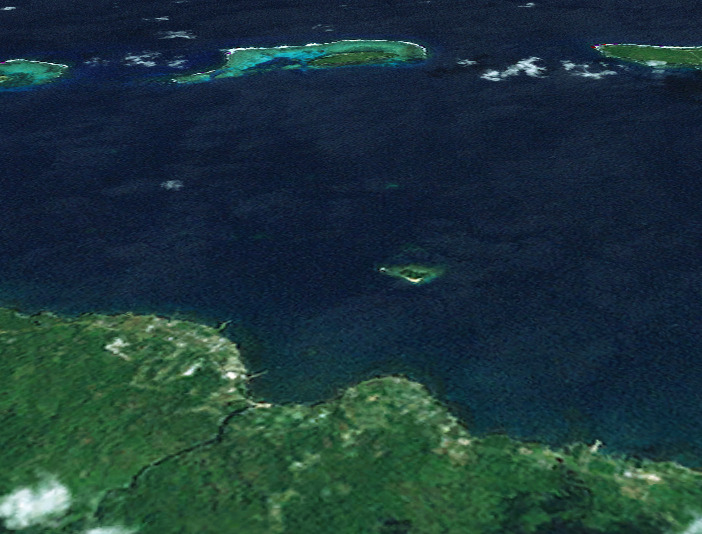
- Satellite image

- Location in Papua New Guinea
- Coordinates: 2°01′50″S 147°16′20″E
- Country: Papua New Guinea
- Province: Manus
- District: Manus District
- LLG: Lorengau Urban LLG
- President: 2007

Government
  - President: Mr. Pohakiu Samson
- Elevation: 40 m (130 ft)

Population (2013)
  - Total: 6,313
- Time zone: UTC+10 (AEST)
- Languages: Lele, Tok Pisin, English

Lorengau is the major town in Manus Province, Papua New Guinea. The town is located on the edge of Seeadler Harbour on Manus Island, in the Admiralty Islands, and in 2000 Lorengau was recorded to have a population of 5,829.

== History ==
=== World War II ===
During World War II Manus Island was the site of an observation post manned by No. 4 Section, 'B' Platoon, 1st Independent Company, Australian Imperial Force., who also provided medical treatment to the inhabitants. Manus was first bombed by the Japanese on 25 January 1942, the radio mast being the main target. On 8 April 1942 an Imperial Japanese force consisting of the light cruiser Tatsuta, destroyer Mutsuki and a troop transport ship Mishima Maru entered Lorengau harbour, and several hundred of Japanese soldiers of the 8th Special Base Force, swarmed ashore onto Australia's mandated responsibility. With little and limited resources the Australian 4th section withdrew to the jungle. The Japanese established an administrative base and airstrip. In February 1944 the United States and Australian forces launched a six-week campaign to recapture the facility, which was eventually achieved on 18 March 1944.

The Americans expanded the Japanese base and constructed a huge naval base at nearby Lombrum, Manus Naval Base. An airstrip capable of handling heavy bombers was constructed at Momote and it was here that the invasion to capture the Philippines was staged.

After the war, the base was scrapped and all equipment was bulldozed into pits or the harbour.

=== Australian immigration detention centres ===
In 2017 Manus Regional Processing Centre was closed and the hundreds of refugees and asylum seekers who were indefinitely detained there by the Australian Government were moved, many by force, to three new centres in/near Lorengau. These new centers were West Lorengau Haus, Hillside Haus and East Lorengau Refugee Transit Centre. At the time, the new centers were not finished and 60 men were left without a place to stay. Those detained at the new centres were allowed to leave the centres during the day (with restrictions), but could not leave Manus Island.

Paladin Group, a multinational security company and service provider (owned and operated by two Australian men, through a Singapore holding company), are contracted to provide IT, security, local transport and some site management for the Lorengau Centres. Paladin's contract is worth over $400 million AUD.

== Climate ==
Lorengau has a tropical rainforest climate (Af) with heavy rainfall year-round.

Climate data for Lorengau
Month	Jan	Feb	Mar	Apr	May	Jun	Jul	Aug	Sep	Oct	Nov	Dec	Year
Mean daily maximum °C (°F)	31.2 (88.2)	31.2 (88.2)	31.2 (88.2)	30.9 (87.6)	31.4 (88.5)	30.6 (87.1)	30.5 (86.9)	30.5 (86.9)	31.3 (88.3)	31.7 (89.1)	31.8 (89.2)	31.3 (88.3)	31.1 (88.0)
Daily mean °C (°F)	26.9 (80.4)	26.9 (80.4)	27.0 (80.6)	27.0 (80.6)	27.4 (81.3)	26.9 (80.4)	26.8 (80.2)	26.7 (80.1)	27.2 (81.0)	27.4 (81.3)	27.4 (81.3)	27.1 (80.8)	27.1 (80.7)
Mean daily minimum °C (°F)	22.7 (72.9)	22.7 (72.9)	22.9 (73.2)	23.1 (73.6)	23.4 (74.1)	23.2 (73.8)	23.1 (73.6)	23.0 (73.4)	23.1 (73.6)	23.1 (73.6)	23.0 (73.4)	22.9 (73.2)	23.0 (73.4)
Average precipitation mm (inches)	291 (11.5)	268 (10.6)	317 (12.5)	306 (12.0)	256 (10.1)	322 (12.7)	337 (13.3)	307 (12.1)	249 (9.8)	270 (10.6)	296 (11.7)	290 (11.4)	3,509 (138.3)
