= Lou language (Austronesian) =

Southeast Admiralty Islands language

Lou
- Native to: Papua New Guinea
- Region: Manus Province
- Native speakers: (1,000 cited 1994)
- Language family: Austronesian: Malayo-Polynesian; Oceanic; Admiralty Islands; Eastern Admiralty Islands; Southeast Admiralty Islands; Lou

Language codes
- ISO 639-3: loj
- Glottolog: louu1245

Lou is a Southeast Admiralty Islands language spoken on Lou Island of Manus Province, Papua New Guinea by 1,000 people.

== Dialects ==
There are three dialects. The main dialect is Rei.

== Grammar ==
Lou has thirteen consonants and seven vowels. It is a nominative–accusative language and has subject–verb–object (SVO) word order.
