= Malawian Sign Language =

Sign language used in Malawi

- Native to: Malawi
- Native speakers: 93,000 (2021)
- Language family: isolate?

Language codes
- ISO 639-3: lws
- Glottolog: mala1549

Malawian Sign Language is the language of the deaf community of Malawi.
