= Los Negros Rural LLG =

Local-level government in Papua New Guinea

- Country: Papua New Guinea
- Province: Manus Province
- Time zone: UTC+10 (AEST)

Los Negros Rural LLG is a local-level government (LLG) of Manus Province, Papua New Guinea.

== Wards ==
- 01. Loniu
- 02. Lolak
- 03. Lombrum
- 04. Papitalai
- 05. Naringel
- 06. Riuriu
- 07. Salamei Settlement
- 08. Mokareng
- 81. Lombrum Naval Base
