= Los Negros Island =

Island in Papua New Guinea

Coordinates: 2°2′55″S 147°25′7″E

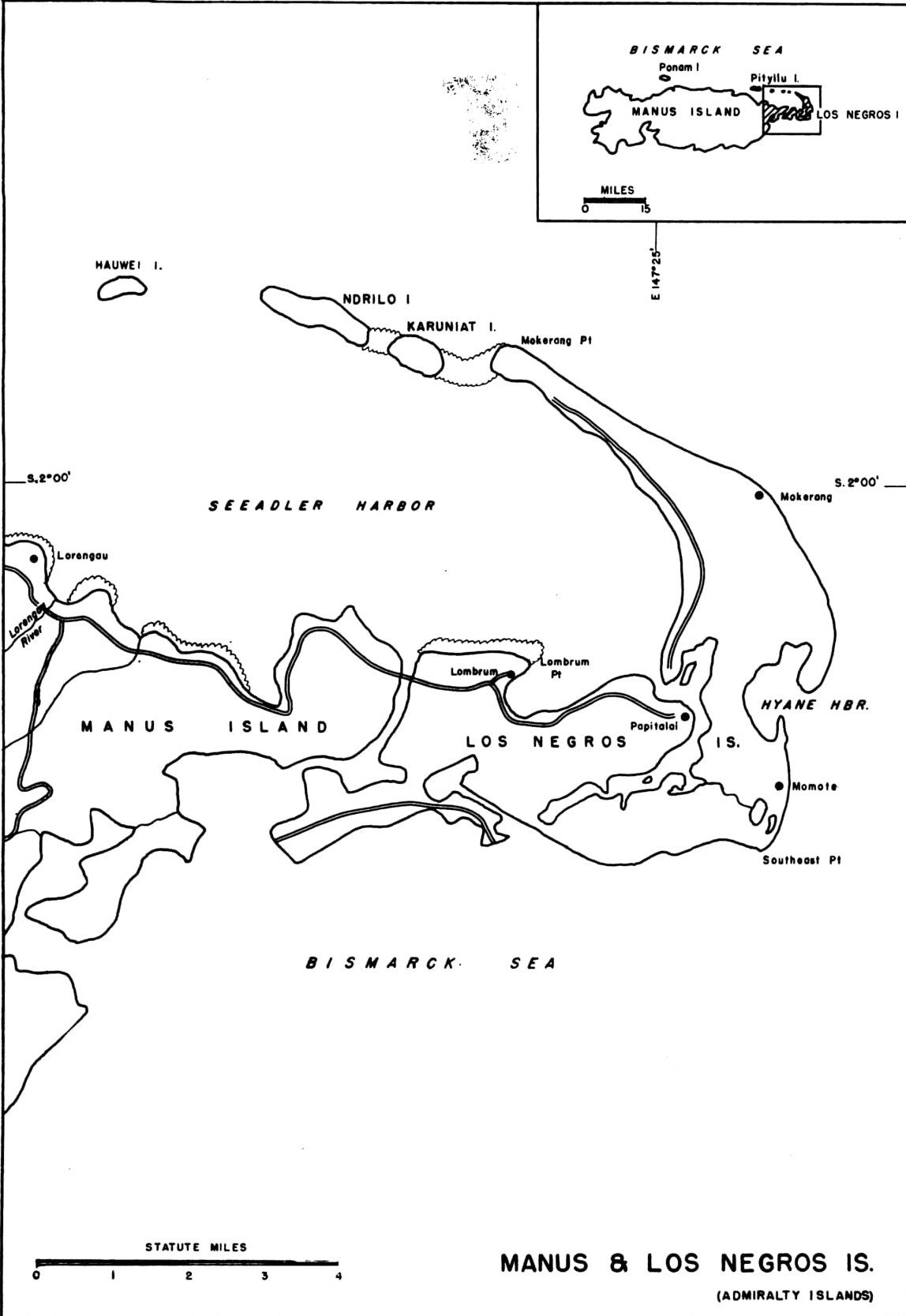
Map of the island

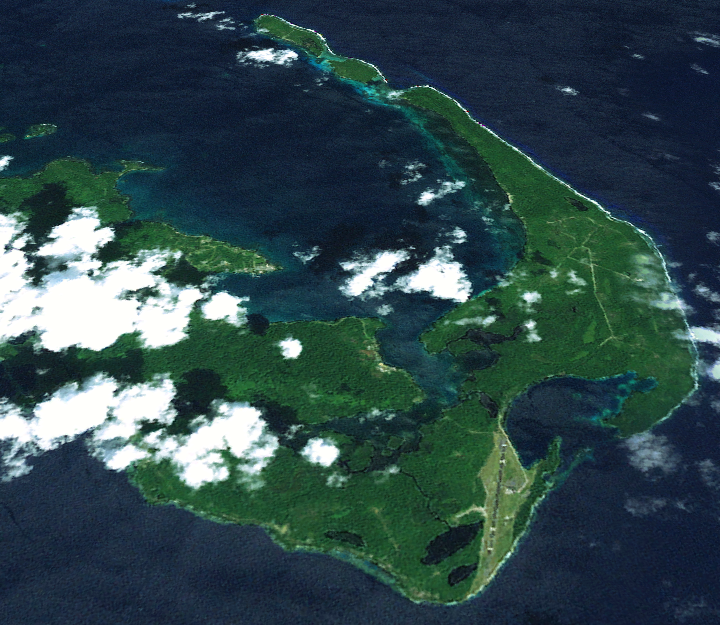
Los Negros Island

Los Negros Island is the third largest of the Admiralty Islands. It is significant because it contains the main airport of Manus Province on its eastern coastline, at Momote. It is connected to Lorengau, the capital of the province, on Manus Island, via a highway and bridge across the Lonui Passage, which separates Los Negros from the larger Manus Island. It forms part of the Los Negros Rural LLG.

The Manus Regional Processing Centre, an Australian immigration detention facility for illegal immigrants and people apprehended on boats while trying to reach Australia, was located on Los Negros Island. It was part, together with Nauru, of Australia's "Pacific Solution" policy, and it housed asylum seekers while their claims for refugee protection were processed. The centre was initially opened in 2001. It closed in 2008 but was reopened in 2012. The detention centre was eventually closed in November 2017 following a ruling by the Supreme Court of Papua New Guinea that found detention there to be illegal.

== History ==
Los Negros was formerly a Japanese base during World War II, and was heavily assaulted on February 29, 1944 by Allied forces, during the Battle of Los Negros which was the spearhead for the Admiralty Islands campaign.

After its capture by allied forces, Los Negros was developed over the spring and summer of 1944 into an important air and sea base that was used by allied forces until September 1945. Allied development included the creation of an advanced naval base, Manus Naval Base at Seeadler Harbor, a seaplane base at Lombrum Point and an extended airfield to accommodate heavy aircraft built at Mokerang Plantation.

The Australian War Crimes Court held a series of trials of accused war criminals at Los Negros between June 1950 and April 1951.
