= Manus Province =

Province in Papua New Guinea

Manus Province Manus Provins (Tok Pisin)
- Flag

- Manus Province in Papua New Guinea
- Coordinates: 2°5′S 147°0′E
- Country: Papua New Guinea
- Capital: Lorengau
- Districts: List: Manus District

Government
  - Governor: Charlie Benjamin

Area
  - Total: 2,000 km^{2} (770 sq mi)

Population (2024 census)
  - Total: 69,560
  - Density: 35/km^{2} (90/sq mi)
- Time zone: UTC+10 (AEST)
- ISO 3166 code: PG-MRL
- HDI (2022): 0.624 medium · 2nd of 22

Manus Province is the smallest province in Papua New Guinea in terms of both land area and population, with a land area of 2,000 square kilometres (770 sq mi), but with more than 220,000 square kilometres (85,000 sq mi) of water, and the total population is 69,560. The provincial town of Manus is Lorengau.

The province consists of only one district (Manus District; with identical boundaries to those of the province), 12 Local Level Governments (LLGs) and 127 Wards.

The province is made up of the Admiralty Islands (a group of 18 islands in the Bismarck Archipelago), as well as Wuvulu Island and nearby atolls in the west, which collectively are referred to as the Western Islands. The largest island in the group is Manus Island, where Lorengau and a former Australian immigration detention centre are located.

== Flag ==
The Manus friarbird, known locally as the chauka, is represented on the Manus provincial flag. The designer of the Manus Province flag Luke Bulei explained his reasons for its design in 1977: chauka is only found in the Manus province; it heralds dawn and signals sunset. NBC Radio Station had changed its name to Maus Bilong Chauka several years earlier. Bulei explained that the colour brown on the flag represents the inland people and the blue represents the island people. The other important symbol on the flag is the green snail, which is unique to Manus Province.

== District and LLGs ==
Manus Province has a single district, which contains one urban (Lorengau) and eleven rural Local Level Government (LLG) areas. Manus District has the highest number of LLGs of any other district in Papua New Guinea. For census purposes, the LLG areas are subdivided into wards and those into census units.

District	District Capital	LLG Name
Manus District	Lorengau	Aua-Wuvulu Rural
Manus District	Lorengau	Balopa Rural
Manus District	Lorengau	Bisikani-Soparibeu Kabin Rural
Manus District	Lorengau	Lelemadih-Bupichupeu Rural
Manus District	Lorengau	Lorengau Urban
Manus District	Lorengau	Los Negros Rural
Manus District	Lorengau	Nali Sopat-Penabu Rural
Manus District	Lorengau	Nigoherm Rural
Manus District	Lorengau	Pobuma Rural
Manus District	Lorengau	Pomutu-Kurti-Andra Rural
Manus District	Lorengau	Rapatona Rural
Manus District	Lorengau	Tetidu Rural

== Provincial leaders ==
The province was governed by a decentralised provincial administration, headed by a Premier, from 1977 to 1995. Following reforms taking effect that year, notably the introduction of the Organic Law on Provincial Government and Local Level Government 1995, the national government reassumed some powers, and the role of Premier was replaced by a position of Governor, to be held by the winner of the province-wide seat in the National Parliament of Papua New Guinea.

=== Premiers (1977–1995) ===
Premier	Term
Papi Rasahei	1977–1978
Banabas Kombil	1979–1982
Joel Maiah	1982–1984
Stephen Pokawin	1984–1995

=== Governors (1995–present) ===
Governor	Term
Martin Thompson	1995–1996
Stephen Pokawin	1996–2002
Jacob Jumogot	2002–2007
Michael Sapau	2007–2012
Charlie Benjamin	2012–present

== Members of the National Parliament ==
The province and each district is represented by a Member of the National Parliament. There is one provincial electorate and each district is an open electorate. Job Pomat as Manus District Open Member, elected into office in 2016, made history as the first politician from the province to be elected as the Speaker of the Parliament of Papua New Guinea in 2016.

Electorate	Member
Manus Provincial	Charlie Benjamin
Manus Open	Job Pomat
