= Manus Island =

Island within Manus Province, Papua New Guinea

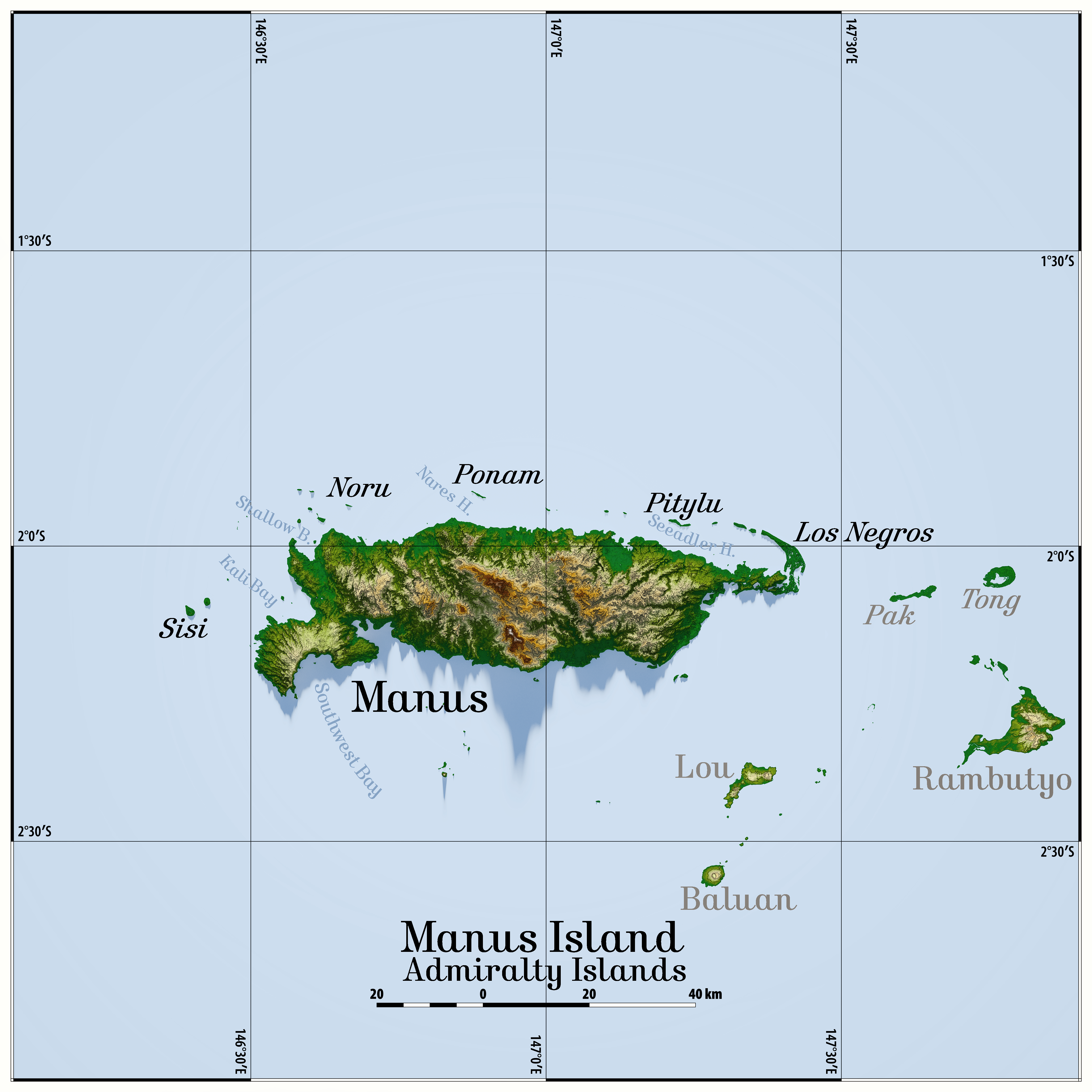
- Location of the Manus Island among the Admiralty Islands

- Location within Papua New Guinea

Geography
- Coordinates: 2.1°S 146.9°E
- Archipelago: Admiralty Islands
- Area: 2,100 km^{2} (810 sq mi)
- Length: 100 km (60 mi)
- Width: 30 km (19 mi)
- Highest elevation: 718 m (2356 ft)
- Highest point: Mt. Dremsel

Administration
- Papua New Guinea (PNG)
- Province: Manus Province
- Largest settlement: Lorengau (pop. 5,829)

Demographics
- Population: 50,321 (province) (2011)

Manus Island is part of Manus Province in northern Papua New Guinea and is the largest of the Admiralty Islands. It is the fifth-largest island in Papua New Guinea, with an area of 2,100 km^{2} (810 sq mi), measuring around 100 km × 30 km (60 mi × 20 mi). Manus Island is covered in rugged jungles which can be broadly described as lowland tropical rain forest. The highest point on Manus Island is Mt. Dremsel, 718 metres (2,356 ft) above sea level at the centre of the south coast. Manus Island is volcanic in origin and probably broke through the ocean's surface in the late Miocene, 8 to 10 million years ago. The substrate of the island is either directly volcanic or from uplifted coral limestone.

Lorengau, the capital of Manus Province, is located on the island. Momote Airport, the terminal for Manus Province, is located on nearby Los Negros Island. A bridge connects Los Negros Island to Manus Island and the provincial capital of Lorengau. In the 2000 census, the whole Manus Province had a population of 50,321. The Austronesian Manus languages are spoken on the island.

Papua New Guinea allowed the government of Australia to run a controversial offshore immigration detention centre, the Manus Regional Processing Centre, which was situated on adjacent Los Negros Island from 2001 to 2017, to house asylum seekers arriving by boat found within Australia's defined territorial borders.

Manus Island is home to the endemic emerald green snail, whose shells were harvested to be sold as jewellery; this continues, albeit at a lesser scale, as due to the snail's status as a threatened species, its sale for this purpose is now illegal in many jurisdictions.

== History ==
The first recorded sighting of Manus Island by Europeans was by Spanish explorer Álvaro de Saavedra on board the carrack Florida on 15 August 1528, while trying to return to New Spain from the Maluku Islands. Saavedra circled Manus Island, and landed possibly on Murai islet to the south west. Murai was found to be inhabited and some natives came out in canoes, attacking with bows and arrows. Three of these men were captured by the Spaniards, and were returned by Saavedra to the same island, on his second attempt to return to North America the following year. Manus Island was charted as Urays la Grande or Big Urays, which is probably a projection of Murai to signify "big Murai".

=== World War II ===
In World War II Manus Island was the site of an observation post manned by No. 4 Section, 'B' Platoon, 1st Independent Company, Australian Imperial Force, who also provided medical treatment to the inhabitants. Manus was first bombed by the Japanese on 25 January 1942, the radio mast being the main target.

On 8 April 1942 an Imperial Japanese force consisting of the light cruiser Tatsuta, destroyer Mutsuki and a troop transport ship Mishima Maru entered Lorengau harbour and several hundred Japanese soldiers of the 8th Special Base Force invaded the island. The vastly outnumbered Australians withdrew into the jungle to fight a guerilla campaign. Later in 1942, Japan established a military base on Manus Island, using prisoners of war (notably Sikh prisoners of the 5th/11th Sikh regiment taken in the Fall of Singapore) as slave labor.

The island was attacked by United States forces in the Admiralty Islands campaign of February – March 1944. An Allied naval base was established at Seeadler Harbor, Manus Naval Base, on the island and it later supported the British Pacific Fleet. The ammunition ship USS Mount Hood exploded in Seeadler Harbor on 10 November 1944 with a heavy loss of life of US Navy personnel.

In 1950–51 the Australian government conducted the last trials against Japanese war criminals on the island. One case heard was that of Takuma Nishimura, who faced an Australian military court. He had already been tried by a British military court in relation to the Sook Ching massacre in Singapore and sentenced to life imprisonment. While on a stopover in Hong Kong he was intercepted by Australian military police. Evidence was presented stating that Nishimura had ordered the shootings of wounded Australian and Indian soldiers at Parit Sulong and the disposal of bodies to cover up the killings. In this trial he was found guilty and was hanged on 11 June 1951.

American anthropologist Margaret Mead lived on Manus Island before and after the war, and gave detailed accounts in Growing up in New Guinea and New Lives for Old.

== Detention centre ==
In addition to its resident population, asylum seekers have been located on Los Negros between 2001 and 2004 and since 2012.

Australia set up the Manus Regional Processing Centre on Manus Island in 2001 as part of its Pacific Solution immigration policy. In August 2012, the Australian Government controversially announced it would resume offshore processing; in November 2012 the relocation of asylum-seekers to Manus Island resumed.

On 26 April 2016, the Supreme Court of Papua New Guinea ruled that the detention of asylum seekers on Manus Island was illegal, and Prime Minister Peter O'Neill announced that the centre would be closed. After a stand-off involving PNG military and police, all remaining men were removed to new accommodation at the East Lorengau Refugee Transit Centre, Hillside Haus and West Lorengau Haus by 23 November 2017.

In late 2019, the remaining asylum seekers were moved to Port Moresby, and upon request by the PNG government, the Australian Government terminated the contracts of the service providers for the detention centre and other facilities as of 30 November 2019.

== Naval bases ==
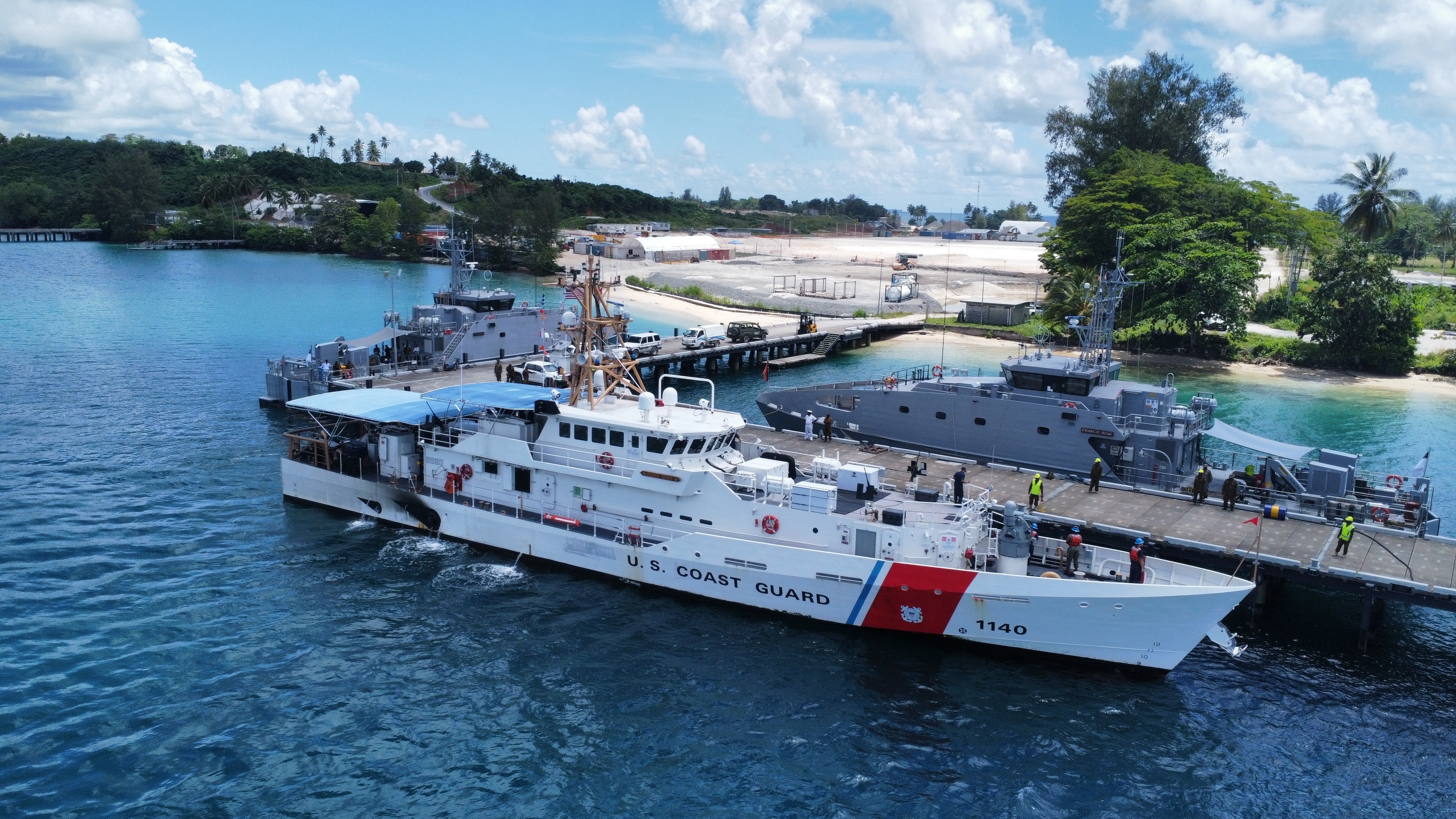
PNG Defence Force and United States Coast Guard patrol boats at Manus Island in 2022

On 20 September 2018, The Australian reported that Australia and Papua New Guinea were discussing providing port facilities to the Royal Australian Navy and US Navy on Manus Island. Australia and the United States would help expand Lombrum Naval Base, so there would be facilities for Australian naval vessels there. The newspaper reported that Australia was countering interest China had placed in expanding Papua New Guinea's port facilities at Wewak, Kikori, Vanimo and Manus Island. Manus Island is the most important of these four ports, as it is a deep-water port near important shipping lanes. The RAN operated a naval base on Manus Island from the 1950s until transferred to the Papua New Guinea Defence Force in 1974.

== Interstellar meteor ==
In April 2022, the 2014 meteor called CNEOS 2014-01-08 was confirmed to have been the first known object from beyond the Solar System to have struck Earth. Some debris had reached the surface off the coast of Manus Island and may be recoverable.

== See also ==
- Admiralty Islands languages
  - Manus languages
