= Admiralty Islands languages =

Oceanic language group

Admiralty Islands
- Geographic distribution: Admiralty Islands
- Linguistic classification: Austronesian: Malayo-Polynesian; Oceanic; Admiralty Islands
- Proto-language: Proto-Admiralty Islands (Proto-Admiralty)
- Subdivisions: Eastern Admiralty Islands; Western Admiralty Islands; Yapese ?

Language codes
- ISO 639-3: –
- Glottolog: admi1239
- Admiralties and Yapese

The Admiralty Islands languages are a group of some thirty Oceanic languages spoken on the Admiralty Islands. They may include Yapese, which has proven difficult to classify.

== Languages ==
According to Lynch, Ross, & Crowley (2002), the structure of the family is:

- Admiralty Islands languages
  - Eastern
    - Manus
    - Southeast
      - Baluan-Pam
      - Lenkau
      - Lou
      - Nauna, Penchal
  - Western
    - Northern Kaniet and Southern Kaniet (†)
    - Seimat
    - Wuvulu-Aua (as two languages)

As noted, Yapese and Nguluwan may be part of the Admiralty Islands languages as well.
