= Purdy Islands =

Island group in Papua New Guinea

Coordinates: 2°55′2″S 146°22′0″E

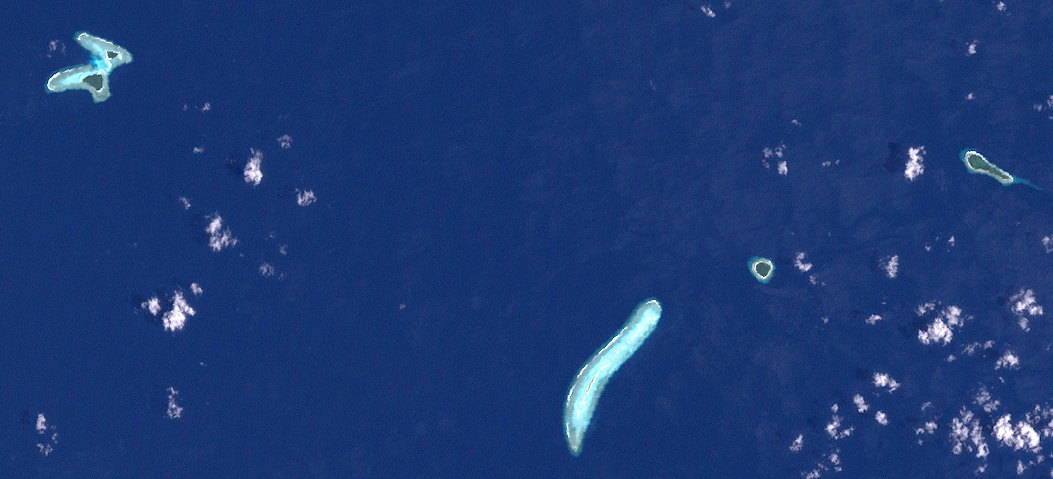
Bat Islands in the upper left; Rat, Mouse and Mole Islands to the right

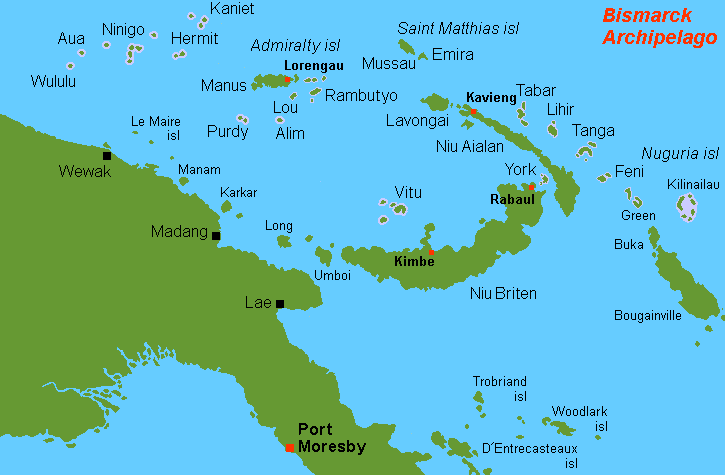
Map of the Bismarck Archipelago

The Purdy Islands (or Mwilitau Islands) are an uninhabited island group in the Bismarck Sea, belonging to the people of M'Buke Island in Manus, Papua New Guinea. The Purdy Islands, Mole, Mouse, Rat, plus Alim and Bat (or North Bat and South Bat), form part of the Admiralty Islands group, in Manus Province.

== History ==
The islands are owned by the Mbuke people. They were named after hydrographer John Purdy by his friend Captain Abraham Bristow on 16 February 1817. Bat Island was the site of RAAF radar station 340 RS between March 1944 and April 1944 during the Second World War. It was one of five such radar stations located within the Admiralty Islands to support the American Invasion. Bat Island proved to be a very dangerous location because it was infested with rats that carried mites which in turn carried Scrub typhus. The majority of the 30 or so strong unit succumbed to Scrub typhus and the station was abandoned after just over a month of service. A contingent of survivors and reinforcements returned in May 1944 to collect the mobile LW-AW radar station and all the equipment that had been left behind. There is one survivor of this radar station still living in Australia as at July 2018.

== Geography ==
Located in the Bismarck Sea, the Purdys are part of the Admiralty Islands group, which also contains Admiralty Island, Jesus Maria Island, Los Reyes Islands, La Vandola Island (Nauna Island), Hayrick Island (Papialou Island), Platform Island, Small Round Island, High Island, Low Island, San Miguel Islands, Elizabeth Island (Alim Island), Anachoretes Islands, Los Monjos Island, Boudeuse Island (Liot Island), L'Echiquier Islands, Los Eremitanos Islands, Matty Island, and Durour Island. The Purdy Island group lies 38 miles (61 km) to the southwest of Manus Island and belongs administratively to Manus Province.

The Purdy group includes five islands. These are Alim and Bat (or North Bat and South Bat), as well as Mole, Mouse, and Rat. Bat Island is to the west, Rat and Mouse Islands are to the east, Mole Island is to the northeast of Mouse. About 4 miles (6.4 km) west of Mouse Island can be found Latent Reef. Another reef is southwest of Bat Island. Other formations nearby include the shoals named Sherburne and Sydney, as well as the reefs named Circular and Albert. They consist of coral formations.

== Fauna and flora ==
The uninhabited islands are a breeding ground for the green sea turtle. The islands are visited by people only to exploit the turtle and coconut palm oil.
