= Geography of Papua New Guinea =

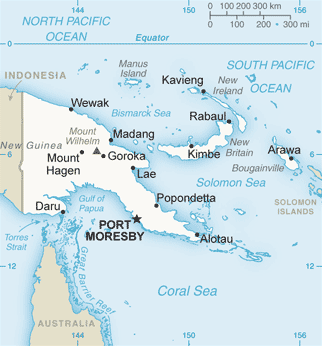
- Continent: Pacific Ocean
- Region: Oceania
- Coordinates: 6°00′S 147°00′E
- Area: Ranked 54th
  - Total: 462,840 km^{2} (178,700 sq mi)
  - Land: 98%
  - Water: 2%
- Coastline: 5,152 km (3,201 mi)
- Borders: 820 kilometres (510 miles)
- Highest point: Mount Wilhelm; 4,509 metres (14,793 ft)
- Lowest point: Pacific Ocean; 0 m
- Exclusive economic zone: 2,402,288 km^{2} (927,529 mi^{2})

The geography of Papua New Guinea describes the eastern half of the island of New Guinea, the islands of New Ireland, New Britain and Bougainville, and smaller nearby islands. Together these make up the nation of Papua New Guinea in tropical Oceania, located in the western edge of the Pacific Ocean.

Papua New Guinea is largely mountainous, and much of it is covered with tropical rainforest. The New Guinea Highlands (or Central Range) run the length of New Guinea, and the highest areas receive snowfall—a rarity in the tropics. Within Papua New Guinea Mount Wilhelm is the highest peak, at 4,509 m (14,793 ft). There are several major rivers, notably the Sepik River, which is 1,126 km (700 mi) long, which winds through lowland swamp plains to the north coast, and the Fly River at 1,050 km (650 mi) in length, which flows through one of the largest swamplands in the world to the south coast. The Highlands consist of a number of smaller ranges running west to east, such as the Finisterre Range which dominates the Huon Peninsula to the north of the city of Lae. At 462,840 km^{2} (178,700 mi^{2}) it is the world's third largest island country.

Papua New Guinea has one land border—that which divides the island of New Guinea. Across the 820 km (509 mi) border is the Indonesian provinces of Papua, Highland Papua and South Papua. Papua New Guinea's border with Indonesia is not straight; the border loops slightly to the west along the Fly River in the south-central part of New Guinea, on the western edge of Papua New Guinea's Western Province. There are maritime borders with Australia to the south and Solomon Islands to the southeast.

== Physical geography ==
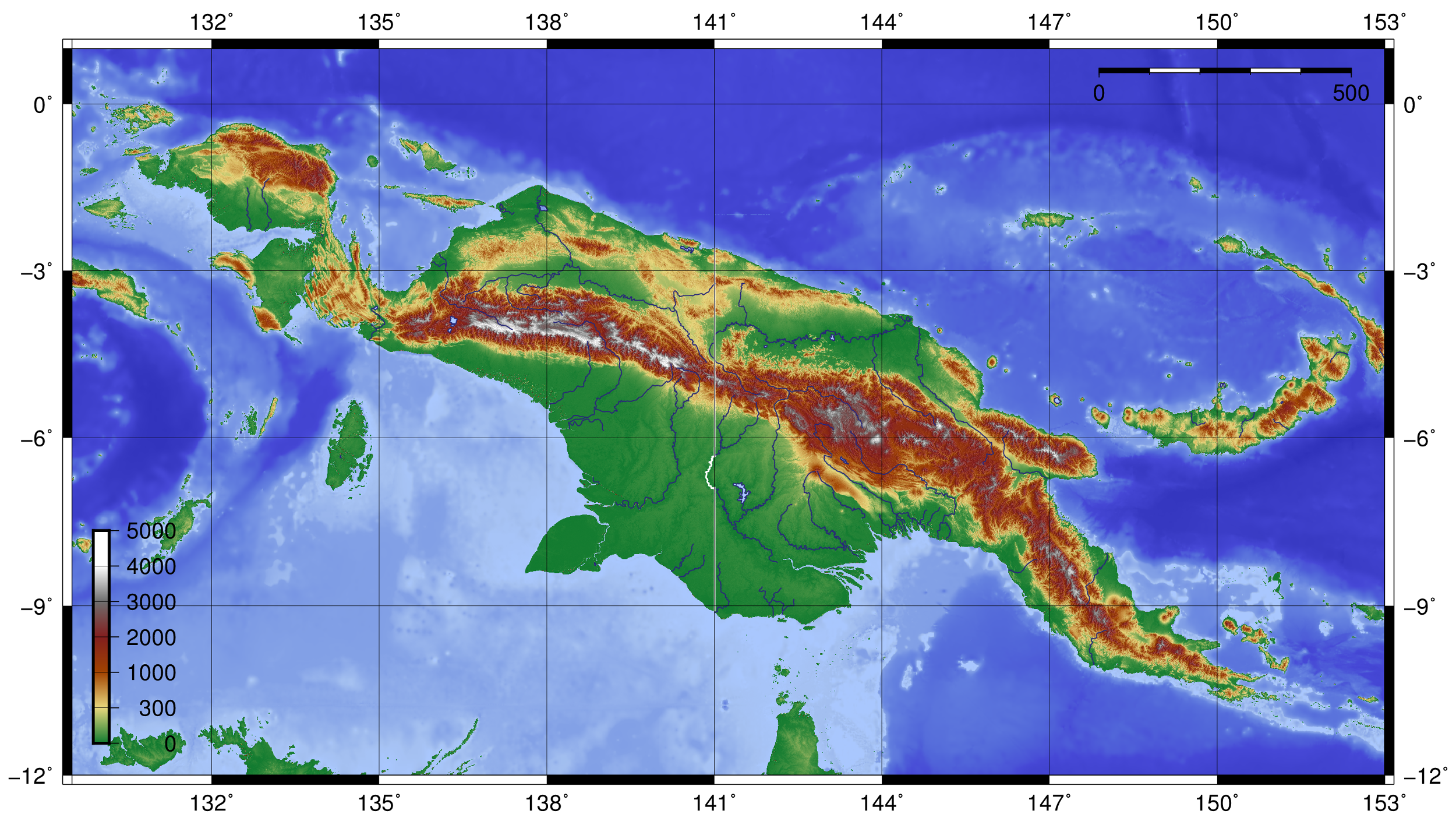
New Guinea's topography.

Papua New Guinea extends over 462,840 km^{2} (178,704 sq mi), including a large mainland a number of islands. The country lies just south of the equator, and shares a land border with Indonesia, and maritime borders with Australia, the Solomon Islands, and the Federated States of Micronesia. The island of New Guinea lies at the east of the Malay Archipelago. The country is separated from Australia's Cape York Peninsula by the shallow 152 kilometres (94 mi) Torres Strait. To the west of this strait is the shallow Arafura Sea, while to its east is the much deeper Coral Sea. The Gulf of Papua covers much of the southern coast, while the Solomon Sea lies east of the mainland.

The total coastline is longer than 10,000 kilometres (6,200 mi), and the country has an exclusive economic zone of 2,396,575 km^{2} (925,323 mi^{2}). the largest fisheries zone in the South Pacific. The territorial waters and exclusive economic zone were established by the National Seas Act 1977. The country covers two timezones, with the Autonomous Region of Bougainville an hour ahead of the rest of the country.

452,860 km^{2} (174,850 mi^{2}) is land and 9,980 km^{2} (3,850 mi^{2}) is water. This makes it the 3rd largest island country in the world. Its mainland coastline is 5,152 km (3,201 mi) long.

Geologically, the island of New Guinea is a northern extension of the Indo-Australian tectonic plate, forming part of a single land mass which is Australia-New Guinea (also called Sahul or Meganesia). It is connected to the Australian segment by a shallow continental shelf across the Torres Strait, which in former ages lay exposed as a land bridge, particularly during ice ages when sea levels were lower than at present. As the Indo-Australian Plate (which includes landmasses of India, Australia, and the Indian Ocean floor in between) drifts north, it collides with the Eurasian Plate. The collision of the two plates pushed up the Himalayas, the Indonesian islands, and New Guinea's Central Range. The Central Range is much younger and higher than the mountains of Australia, so high that it is home to rare equatorial glaciers.

The geological history of New Guinea is complex. It lies where the north-moving Indo-Australian plate meets the west-moving Pacific plate. This has caused its highly variable geography both on the mainland and on its islands. Tectonic movement is also the origin of the country's active volcanos and frequent earthquakes. The country is situated on the Pacific Ring of Fire, with altogether 14 known active volcanos and 22 dormant ones. The area south of the mountainous spine is part of the Australian craton, with much of the land to the north being accreted terrain. Both the mainland and the main island groups of the Bismarck Archipelago and the Bougainville are dominated by large mountains. Altogether, one estimate mountains cover at least 72% of the country. Of the rest, 15% are plains and 11% swamps. The country includes about 600 islands of various sizes. Another suggests mountains and hills make up 52%, while defining 19% as plans and plateaus, and 18% as floodplains. The remaining land was classified as volcanic or littoral.

The New Guinea Highlands lie within a spine of mountain ranges which run along the centre of the island from Milne Bay in the very southeast of Papua New Guinea through to the western end of Indonesian New Guinea. One of these mountains is Mount Wilhelm, which at 4,509 metres (14,793 ft) is the highest point in the country. Between these mountains are steep valleys, which have a variety of geological histories. The populous region referred to as the Highlands has shorter mountains than those to its northwest and southeast, and includes some relatively flat areas between the mountains.

North of the central mountain belt, a large depression is drained by Sepik River in the west, and the Ramu and Markham Rivers flow through a graben in the east. The depression continues into the waters east of the mainland, forming the New Britain Trench. The northwest coast hosts the Bewani Mountains, Torricelli Range, and Prince Alexander Mountains, which the Sepik River separates from the Adelbert Range further east. East of this, the Huon Peninsula contains the Finisterre Range and the Saruwaged Range. Much of this northern coastline is made up of former seabed that has been raised, and the area remains tectonically active, prone to earthquakes and landslides. West of the Sepik river the northern coastline is highly exposed to the ocean, with no outlying islands, a lack of fringing reefs, and Sissano Lagoon the only sheltered bay. The Sepik river however is navigable for about half of its length.

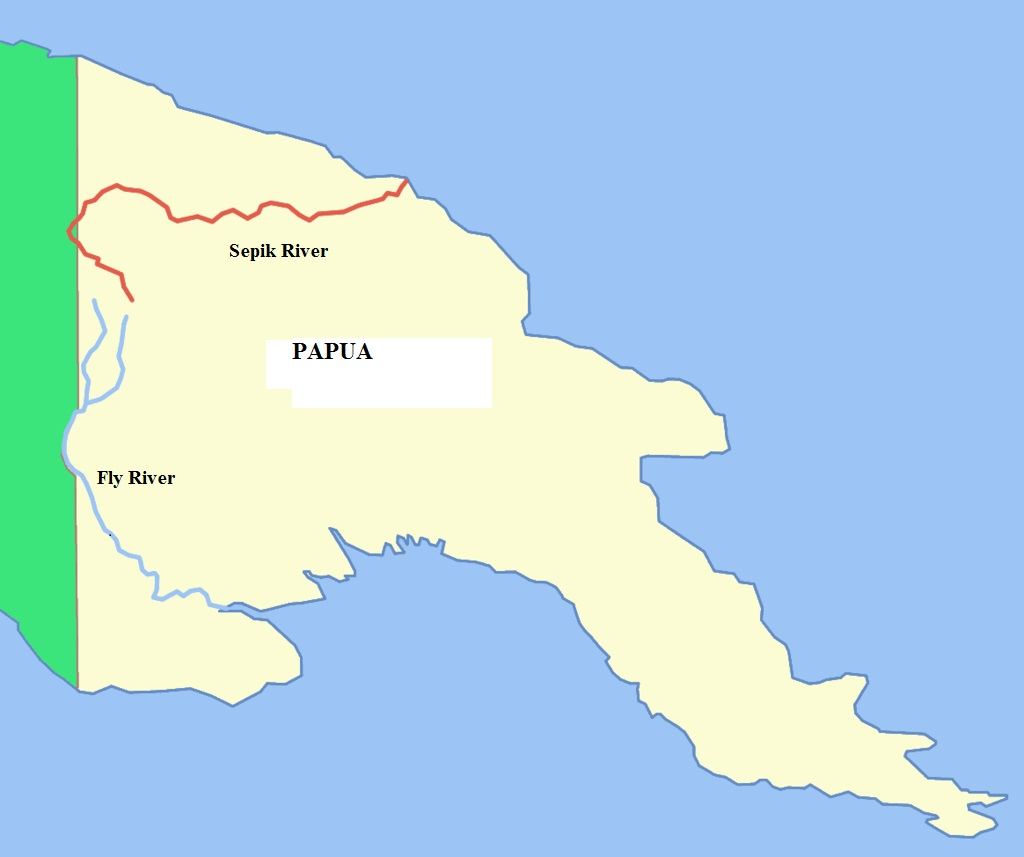
The Sepik-Ramu river system is the main river north of the highlands, while the Fly River winds through lowlands to the south.

The Sepik-Ramu river system extends across the north of the mainland, while the Fly River flows out the south. Both are surrounded by lowland plain and swamp areas. These form two of the nine drainage basins of the mainland. The other two major basins surround the Purari and Markham Rivers. Within this land lies over 5,000 lakes. Of these, only 22 exceed 1,000 hectares (2,500 acres), the largest being Lake Murray at 64,700 hectares (160,000 acres).

The only geologically stable part of the country is its southwestern lowlands, which form the largest contiguous lowland area. The volcanic Mount Bosavi lies in the north of these plains, and the coastal areas can be slightly hilly, especially towards the mouth of the Fly River. Forming a barrier between this area and the highland interior are the tall Southern Fold Mountains. Lake Kutubu lies within this mountain range. The Fly River, which originates in the central mountains, is navigable for the majority of its length.

Other large rivers in the country include the Musa, Kikori, Turama, and Wawoi.

The Papuan Peninsula (considered the island's "tail", and thus also known as the "Bird's Tail Peninsula") in the east contains Mount Lamington volcano and the Hydrographers Range on its northern side. Further east, the area around Cape Nelson has more volcanoes, including Mount Victory and Mount Trafalgar. In its centre runs the Owen Stanley Range, It has a number of sheltered bays, including Milne Bay, Goodenough Bay, Collingwood Bay, and the Huon Gulf. The small islands off the southeast, including the D'Entrecasteaux Islands, the Trobriand Islands, Woodlark Island, and the Louisiade Archipelago total just over 7,000 square kilometres (2,700 sq mi).

The major islands off the northeast of the mainland form along two arcs. One includes small islands near the mainland and the large island of New Britain. While New Britain is mostly not volcanic, volcanic activity along its north and especially in the Gazelle Peninsula around Rabaul has created fertile soil. The other island arc links Manus Island, New Hanover, New Ireland, and Bougainville. Bougainville hosts three large volcanoes. The area of these islands is around 68,000 square kilometres (26,000 sq mi).

The capital of Port Moresby lies on the southern coast. The city of Lae lies towards the east on the northern coast. Only around 2% of the country is regularly cultivated.

The border between Papua New Guinea and Indonesia was confirmed by a treaty with Australia before independence in 1974. The land border comprises a segment of the 141° E meridian from the north coast southwards to where it meets the Fly River flowing east, then a short curve of the river's thalweg to where it meets the 141°01'10" E meridian flowing west, then southwards to the south coast. The 141° E meridian formed the entire eastern boundary of Dutch New Guinea according to its 1828 annexation proclamation. By the Treaty of The Hague (1895) the Dutch and British agreed to a territorial exchange, bringing the entire left bank of the Fly River into British New Guinea and moving the southern border east to the Torasi Estuary. The maritime boundary with Australia was confirmed by a treaty in 1978. In the Torres Strait it runs close to the mainland of New Guinea, keeping the adjacent North Western Torres Strait Islands (Dauan, Boigu and Saibai) under Australian sovereignty. Maritime boundaries with the Solomon Islands were confirmed by a 1989 treaty.

Including all its islands, it lies between latitudes 0° and 12°S, and longitudes 140° and 160°E.

The northernmost point is Mussau Island (1°23' S), southernmost point is Sudest Island (11°65' S), easternmost point is Olava, Bougainville (155°57' E) and the westernmost point is either Bovakaka along the Fly River border with Indonesia or Mabudawan (140°54' E).

Papua New Guinea has several volcanoes, as it is situated along the Pacific Ring of Fire. Volcanic eruptions are not rare, and the area is prone to earthquakes and tsunamis because of this. The volcanic disturbance can often cause severe earthquakes, which in turn can also cause tsunamis. Papua New Guinea is also prone to landslides, often caused by deforestation in major forests. The mountainous regions of Papua New Guinea are the areas most susceptible to landslides causing damage.

Offshore islands include the small, forested Admiralty Islands, the largest of which is Manus, to the north of the main island of New Guinea. These have a distinct plant and animal life from the main island but the natural forest has been cleared in places for logging and agriculture.

A 2019 global remote sensing analysis suggested that there were 1,308 km^{2} (505 sq mi) of tidal flats in Papua New Guinea, making it the 25th ranked country in terms of tidal flat area.

=== Soil ===
Soil quality and composition in Papua New Guinea is highly varied, however the tectonic activity in the country means the soils are relatively young. Over half of the country has Inceptisol soils, while a quarter are Entisols. Around 14% are Ultisols, including a large area in Western Province,. Of the rest, a quarter of New Ireland Province is covered in Alfisols, while a third of East New Britain Province is covered in Mollisols.

=== Natural disasters ===
The country is at risk of earthquakes, tsunamis, volcanic eruptions, floods, landslides, and droughts. Papua New Guinea is famous for its frequent seismic activity, being on the Ring of Fire. On 17 July 1998, a magnitude 7.0 earthquake struck north of Aitape. It triggered a 50-foot-high tsunami, which killed over 2,180 people in one of the worst natural disasters in the country.

In September 2002, a magnitude 7.6 earthquake struck off the coast of Wewak, Sandaun Province, killing six people.

On 25 February 2018, an earthquake of magnitude 7.5 and depth of 35 kilometres struck the middle of Papua New Guinea. The worst of the damage was centred around the Southern Highlands region.

From March to April 2018, a chain of earthquakes hit Hela Province, causing widespread landslides and the deaths of 200 people. Various nations from Oceania and Southeast Asia immediately sent aid to the country.

Another severe earthquake occurred on 11 September 2022, killing seven people and causing damaging shaking in some of the country's largest cities, such as Lae and Madang, it was also felt in the capital Port Moresby.

On May 24, 2024, a landslide hit the village of Kaokalam in Enga Province, about 600 kilometers (372 miles) northwest of the capital, Port Moresby, at about 3 a.m. local time. The landslide buried more than 2000 people alive, caused major destruction to buildings, and food gardens and caused major impact on the economic lifeline of the country. The casualty figure surpasses the 2006 Southern Leyte mudslide tragedy where a total of 1,126 people lost their lives as the debris flow from a landslide followed 10 days of heavy rain. With over 2,000 reported dead by the Papua New Guinea government, this disaster has now emerged as the deadliest landslide of the 21st century.

Climate change is leading to rising sea levels. It is expected that populations will soon be forced to move from some areas of Bougainville, such as the Carteret Islands.

== Climate ==
Share of forest area in total land area, top countries (2021). Papua New Guinea has the eighth highest percentage of forest cover in the world.

As the country lies within the tropics, the overall climate is generally tropical, although it varies locally due to the highly variable geography. Lowland areas are generally 27 °C (81 °F), ranging from a maximum mean temperature of 32 °C (90 °F) to a minimum of 23 °C (73 °F). In the highlands above 2,100 metres (6,900 ft), colder conditions prevail and night frosts are common, while the daytime temperature exceeds 22 °C, regardless of the season. Temperature roughly correlates mostly with altitude. Cloud cover is very common in mountainous areas.

There are two monsoon seasons. The wind generally blows southeast from May to October, and northwest from December to March. This drives overall rain patterns, however the large mountains and rugged terrain create local weather conditions and wide variations in annual rainfall. The area around Port Moresby receives less than 1,000 millimetres (39 in) per year, while some highland areas receive over 8,000 millimetres (310 in). Lowland humidity averages around 80%, and cloud cover is very common. In some areas rain is highly seasonal, with a dry spell from May to November, while in other areas it is more regular. In a few locations, the wet and dry seasons are reversed. The period when the highest rainfall occurs differs by location. Rainfall of between 1,800–3,500 millimetres (71–138 in) is optimal for agriculture, which defines settlement patterns.

Climate change has caused average temperatures to increase by 0.2 °C (32.4 °F) per decade since the 1950s.

Various areas are affected by the Intertropical Convergence Zone, South Pacific convergence zone, and monsoon seasons. The climate in the Papuan Peninsula is relatively mild compared to coastal areas more to the west. The El Niño–Southern Oscillation also sometimes affects rainfall.

Papua New Guinea is one of the few regions close to the equator that experience snowfall, which occurs in the most elevated parts of the mainland.

There is a slight seasonal temperature variation. In lower altitudes, the temperature is around 80 °F (27 °C) year round. But higher altitudes are a constant 70 °F (21 °C), and the highest altitudes, especially of Mount Wilhelm and Mount Giluwe, can see snow.

Climate change is expected to alter the temperature and precipitation of the country, with implications for wildlife, ecosystems and agriculture.

=== Climate data ===
Climate data for Port Moresby (Köppen Aw)
| Month | Jan | Feb | Mar | Apr | May | Jun | Jul | Aug | Sep | Oct | Nov | Dec | Year |
|---|---|---|---|---|---|---|---|---|---|---|---|---|---|
| Record high °C (°F) | 36.2 (97.2) | 36.1 (97.0) | 35.4 (95.7) | 34.2 (93.6) | 33.8 (92.8) | 33.9 (93.0) | 33.3 (91.9) | 33.8 (92.8) | 34.8 (94.6) | 35.5 (95.9) | 36.3 (97.3) | 36.3 (97.3) | 36.3 (97.3) |
| Mean daily maximum °C (°F) | 32.1 (89.8) | 31.6 (88.9) | 31.4 (88.5) | 31.3 (88.3) | 31.0 (87.8) | 30.3 (86.5) | 29.9 (85.8) | 30.3 (86.5) | 31.0 (87.8) | 32.0 (89.6) | 32.5 (90.5) | 32.4 (90.3) | 31.3 (88.3) |
| Daily mean °C (°F) | 27.4 (81.3) | 27.3 (81.1) | 27.1 (80.8) | 27.0 (80.6) | 26.9 (80.4) | 26.1 (79.0) | 25.7 (78.3) | 26.1 (79.0) | 26.5 (79.7) | 27.5 (81.5) | 27.6 (81.7) | 27.8 (82.0) | 26.9 (80.4) |
| Mean daily minimum °C (°F) | 23.7 (74.7) | 23.5 (74.3) | 23.4 (74.1) | 23.5 (74.3) | 23.5 (74.3) | 23.1 (73.6) | 22.4 (72.3) | 22.6 (72.7) | 23.2 (73.8) | 23.5 (74.3) | 23.6 (74.5) | 23.7 (74.7) | 23.3 (73.9) |
| Record low °C (°F) | 20.4 (68.7) | 18.8 (65.8) | 18.3 (64.9) | 16.8 (62.2) | 14.5 (58.1) | 14.5 (58.1) | 10.4 (50.7) | 14.8 (58.6) | 14.4 (57.9) | 16.3 (61.3) | 16.0 (60.8) | 19.6 (67.3) | 10.4 (50.7) |
| Average rainfall mm (inches) | 192.2 (7.57) | 140.6 (5.54) | 189.8 (7.47) | 105.2 (4.14) | 56.2 (2.21) | 21.6 (0.85) | 13.8 (0.54) | 12.0 (0.47) | 14.4 (0.57) | 15.2 (0.60) | 40.0 (1.57) | 97.8 (3.85) | 898.8 (35.38) |
| Average rainy days (≥ 0.1 mm) | 18 | 16 | 18 | 11 | 9 | 6 | 4 | 4 | 5 | 5 | 6 | 12 | 114 |
| Average relative humidity (%) | 79 | 81 | 81 | 82 | 81 | 79 | 77 | 76 | 76 | 76 | 75 | 77 | 78 |
| Mean monthly sunshine hours | 182 | 158 | 184 | 200 | 211 | 200 | 203 | 222 | 213 | 231 | 243 | 216 | 2,463 |
Source 1: World Meteorological Organization
Source 2: Deutscher Wetterdienst (extremes, mean temperature, humidity and sun)

Climate data for Mount Hagen (Köppen Cfb)
| Month | Jan | Feb | Mar | Apr | May | Jun | Jul | Aug | Sep | Oct | Nov | Dec | Year |
|---|---|---|---|---|---|---|---|---|---|---|---|---|---|
| Mean daily maximum °C (°F) | 29 (84) | 29 (84) | 29 (84) | 29 (84) | 29 (84) | 28 (82) | 28 (82) | 28 (82) | 29 (84) | 30 (86) | 30 (86) | 30 (86) | 29 (84) |
| Mean daily minimum °C (°F) | 12 (54) | 13 (55) | 13 (55) | 12 (54) | 12 (54) | 11 (52) | 11 (52) | 11 (52) | 11 (52) | 12 (54) | 12 (54) | 12 (54) | 12 (54) |
| Average rainfall mm (inches) | 283 (11.1) | 299 (11.8) | 309 (12.2) | 249 (9.8) | 180 (7.1) | 122 (4.8) | 135 (5.3) | 163 (6.4) | 193 (7.6) | 218 (8.6) | 208 (8.2) | 279 (11.0) | 2,638 (103.9) |
| Average rainy days (≥ 0.1 mm) | 24 | 25 | 26 | 26 | 25 | 23 | 23 | 22 | 23 | 24 | 23 | 24 | 288 |
| Mean monthly sunshine hours | 155 | 113 | 124 | 120 | 124 | 120 | 124 | 124 | 120 | 155 | 150 | 155 | 1,584 |
Source: Weather2Travel

Climate data for Lae (Köppen Af)
| Month | Jan | Feb | Mar | Apr | May | Jun | Jul | Aug | Sep | Oct | Nov | Dec | Year |
|---|---|---|---|---|---|---|---|---|---|---|---|---|---|
| Mean daily maximum °C (°F) | 31.5 (88.7) | 31.5 (88.7) | 31.0 (87.8) | 30.5 (86.9) | 29.8 (85.6) | 28.8 (83.8) | 28.1 (82.6) | 28.0 (82.4) | 28.7 (83.7) | 29.6 (85.3) | 30.5 (86.9) | 31.1 (88.0) | 29.9 (85.8) |
| Mean daily minimum °C (°F) | 24.3 (75.7) | 24.2 (75.6) | 24.2 (75.6) | 23.9 (75.0) | 23.6 (74.5) | 23.0 (73.4) | 22.4 (72.3) | 22.3 (72.1) | 22.6 (72.7) | 23.2 (73.8) | 23.7 (74.7) | 23.9 (75.0) | 23.4 (74.1) |
| Average rainfall mm (inches) | 241.6 (9.51) | 239.9 (9.44) | 281.1 (11.07) | 347.4 (13.68) | 348.9 (13.74) | 502.8 (19.80) | 477.9 (18.81) | 516.9 (20.35) | 360.9 (14.21) | 442.4 (17.42) | 334.9 (13.19) | 338.2 (13.31) | 4,432.9 (174.52) |
| Average rainy days | 16 | 17 | 18 | 21 | 21 | 21 | 24 | 24 | 22 | 22 | 21 | 19 | 246 |
Source: World Meteorological Organisation

Climate data for Wewak (Köppen Af)
| Month | Jan | Feb | Mar | Apr | May | Jun | Jul | Aug | Sep | Oct | Nov | Dec | Year |
|---|---|---|---|---|---|---|---|---|---|---|---|---|---|
| Mean daily maximum °C (°F) | 30.6 (87.1) | 30.4 (86.7) | 30.5 (86.9) | 30.9 (87.6) | 31.4 (88.5) | 31 (88) | 30.8 (87.4) | 31.1 (88.0) | 31.4 (88.5) | 31.1 (88.0) | 31 (88) | 30.7 (87.3) | 30.9 (87.7) |
| Daily mean °C (°F) | 26.8 (80.2) | 26.7 (80.1) | 26.6 (79.9) | 26.8 (80.2) | 27.1 (80.8) | 26.8 (80.2) | 26.6 (79.9) | 26.6 (79.9) | 27 (81) | 26.9 (80.4) | 26.9 (80.4) | 26.8 (80.2) | 26.8 (80.3) |
| Mean daily minimum °C (°F) | 23 (73) | 23 (73) | 22.8 (73.0) | 22.8 (73.0) | 22.9 (73.2) | 22.6 (72.7) | 22.4 (72.3) | 22.2 (72.0) | 22.6 (72.7) | 22.8 (73.0) | 22.9 (73.2) | 23 (73) | 22.8 (72.8) |
| Average rainfall mm (inches) | 143 (5.6) | 144 (5.7) | 165 (6.5) | 181 (7.1) | 208 (8.2) | 191 (7.5) | 166 (6.5) | 161 (6.3) | 177 (7.0) | 216 (8.5) | 207 (8.1) | 157 (6.2) | 2,116 (83.2) |
| Average rainy days | 17 | 17 | 19 | 20 | 20 | 18 | 18 | 15 | 17 | 19 | 18 | 17 | 215 |
| Mean daily sunshine hours | 5 | 5 | 5 | 5 | 5 | 5 | 5 | 5 | 6 | 6 | 5 | 5 | 5 |
Source 1: Climate-Data.org (altitude: 0m)
Source 2: Weather2Travel for rainy days and sunshine

Climate data for Daru (Köppen Am)
| Month | Jan | Feb | Mar | Apr | May | Jun | Jul | Aug | Sep | Oct | Nov | Dec | Year |
|---|---|---|---|---|---|---|---|---|---|---|---|---|---|
| Mean daily maximum °C (°F) | 31.7 (89.1) | 31.7 (89.1) | 31.2 (88.2) | 30.6 (87.1) | 29.9 (85.8) | 28.9 (84.0) | 28.2 (82.8) | 28.4 (83.1) | 29.2 (84.6) | 30.6 (87.1) | 31.8 (89.2) | 32.4 (90.3) | 30.4 (86.7) |
| Daily mean °C (°F) | 27.5 (81.5) | 27.5 (81.5) | 27.2 (81.0) | 27.0 (80.6) | 26.8 (80.2) | 25.9 (78.6) | 25.2 (77.4) | 25.4 (77.7) | 25.8 (78.4) | 26.8 (80.2) | 27.6 (81.7) | 28.0 (82.4) | 26.7 (80.1) |
| Mean daily minimum °C (°F) | 23.4 (74.1) | 23.3 (73.9) | 23.3 (73.9) | 23.5 (74.3) | 23.7 (74.7) | 23.0 (73.4) | 22.3 (72.1) | 22.4 (72.3) | 22.5 (72.5) | 23.1 (73.6) | 23.5 (74.3) | 23.6 (74.5) | 23.1 (73.6) |
| Average rainfall mm (inches) | 265 (10.4) | 264 (10.4) | 291 (11.5) | 333 (13.1) | 224 (8.8) | 110 (4.3) | 80 (3.1) | 54 (2.1) | 45 (1.8) | 55 (2.2) | 109 (4.3) | 191 (7.5) | 2,021 (79.5) |

Climate data for Goroka (Köppen Am/Af/Cfb)
| Month | Jan | Feb | Mar | Apr | May | Jun | Jul | Aug | Sep | Oct | Nov | Dec | Year |
|---|---|---|---|---|---|---|---|---|---|---|---|---|---|
| Mean daily maximum °C (°F) | 25.5 (77.9) | 25.5 (77.9) | 25.1 (77.2) | 25.2 (77.4) | 25.3 (77.5) | 24.4 (75.9) | 24.0 (75.2) | 24.5 (76.1) | 24.9 (76.8) | 25.3 (77.5) | 25.9 (78.6) | 25.4 (77.7) | 25.1 (77.1) |
| Daily mean °C (°F) | 19.9 (67.8) | 20.1 (68.2) | 19.8 (67.6) | 19.8 (67.6) | 19.7 (67.5) | 18.8 (65.8) | 18.6 (65.5) | 18.9 (66.0) | 19.1 (66.4) | 19.4 (66.9) | 19.7 (67.5) | 19.8 (67.6) | 19.5 (67.0) |
| Mean daily minimum °C (°F) | 14.4 (57.9) | 14.7 (58.5) | 14.6 (58.3) | 14.4 (57.9) | 14.2 (57.6) | 13.3 (55.9) | 13.2 (55.8) | 13.3 (55.9) | 13.4 (56.1) | 13.5 (56.3) | 13.5 (56.3) | 14.3 (57.7) | 13.9 (57.0) |
| Average rainfall mm (inches) | 229 (9.0) | 249 (9.8) | 232 (9.1) | 181 (7.1) | 117 (4.6) | 62 (2.4) | 55 (2.2) | 65 (2.6) | 99 (3.9) | 159 (6.3) | 163 (6.4) | 229 (9.0) | 1,840 (72.4) |

Climate data for Madang (Köppen Af)
| Month | Jan | Feb | Mar | Apr | May | Jun | Jul | Aug | Sep | Oct | Nov | Dec | Year |
|---|---|---|---|---|---|---|---|---|---|---|---|---|---|
| Record high °C (°F) | 33.2 (91.8) | 33.3 (91.9) | 33.3 (91.9) | 33.7 (92.7) | 32.2 (90.0) | 32.2 (90.0) | 31.5 (88.7) | 31.7 (89.1) | 33.4 (92.1) | 31.7 (89.1) | 32.5 (90.5) | 33.6 (92.5) | 33.7 (92.7) |
| Mean daily maximum °C (°F) | 30.8 (87.4) | 30.6 (87.1) | 30.6 (87.1) | 30.6 (87.1) | 30.7 (87.3) | 30.4 (86.7) | 30.2 (86.4) | 30.2 (86.4) | 30.5 (86.9) | 30.9 (87.6) | 31.2 (88.2) | 30.9 (87.6) | 30.6 (87.1) |
| Mean daily minimum °C (°F) | 23.9 (75.0) | 23.8 (74.8) | 23.9 (75.0) | 23.8 (74.8) | 23.9 (75.0) | 23.7 (74.7) | 23.4 (74.1) | 23.7 (74.7) | 23.6 (74.5) | 23.8 (74.8) | 23.9 (75.0) | 23.9 (75.0) | 23.8 (74.8) |
| Record low °C (°F) | 21.0 (69.8) | 20.7 (69.3) | 20.8 (69.4) | 21.1 (70.0) | 20.1 (68.2) | 19.9 (67.8) | 20.0 (68.0) | 18.9 (66.0) | 20.8 (69.4) | 20.3 (68.5) | 20.0 (68.0) | 19.4 (66.9) | 18.9 (66.0) |
| Average rainfall mm (inches) | 343.8 (13.54) | 292.0 (11.50) | 329.8 (12.98) | 389.4 (15.33) | 343.4 (13.52) | 186.4 (7.34) | 144.2 (5.68) | 93.8 (3.69) | 82.6 (3.25) | 239.2 (9.42) | 280.2 (11.03) | 382.0 (15.04) | 3,106.8 (122.31) |
| Average rainy days | 23 | 21 | 23 | 23 | 21 | 18 | 15 | 12 | 11 | 15 | 19 | 23 | 224 |
| Average relative humidity (%) | 85 | 85 | 85 | 85 | 85 | 84 | 84 | 82 | 83 | 83 | 84 | 84 | 84 |
| Mean monthly sunshine hours | 160 | 140 | 144 | 162 | 193 | 195 | 198 | 210 | 227 | 210 | 185 | 160 | 2,184 |
Source 1: World Meteorological Organisation
Source 2: Deutscher Wetterdienst (extremes, humidity and sun)

== Human geography ==
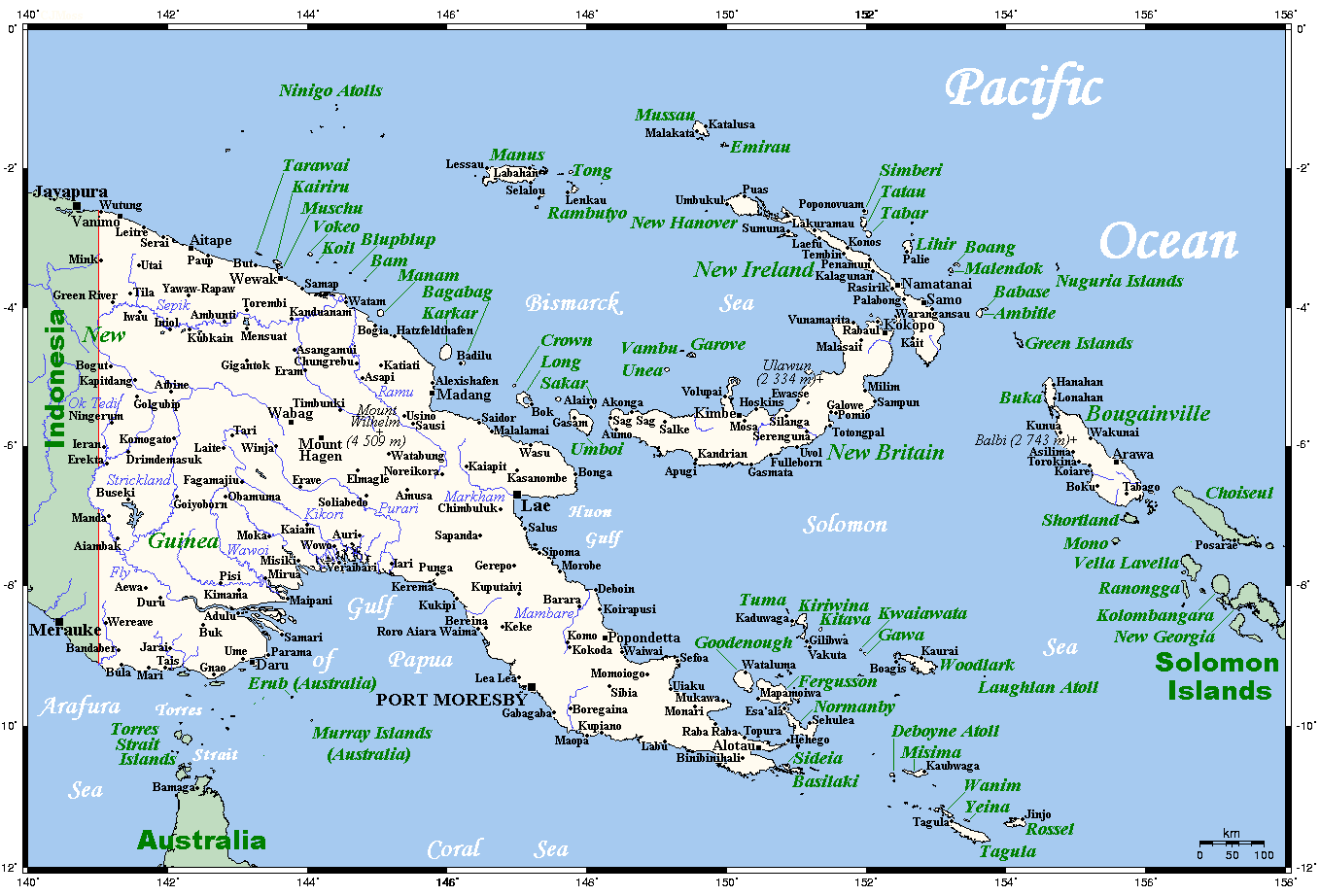
Papua New Guinea's cities, main towns, selected smaller centres, rivers and high peaks

Maritime claims: These are measured from claimed archipelagic baselines.

- Continental shelf:

200 metres (660 ft) depth or to the depth of exploitation

- Exclusive economic zone:

2,402,288 km^{2} (927,529 mi^{2}). 200 mi (320 km) nautical miles

- Territorial sea:

12 nautical miles (22 km)

== Land use ==
Natural resources: gold, copper, silver, natural gas, timber, oil, fisheries

Land use:

- arable land: 0.49%
- permanent crops: 1.4%
- other (forests, swamplands, etc.): 98.11% (2005 estimate)

Classifications of land use can vary considerably depending on the methodology and definitions used.

As of 1975, 69.5% of land was considered totally unused. This was mostly forest. 25.6% was cultivated to different extents, although half was at very low levels, including land left to fallow to the extent it may have secondary forest. The remaining 4.9% was uncultivated, including grassland and sago stands. From 1975 to 1996, the amount of intensely cultivated land increased, although the overall amount of cultivated land remained mostly the same, indicating land use changes were predominantly taking place in already used land.

The region with the most intensely used land is the Highlands. Another hotspot is the area around Blanche Bay in East New Britain Province.

== Biodiversity ==
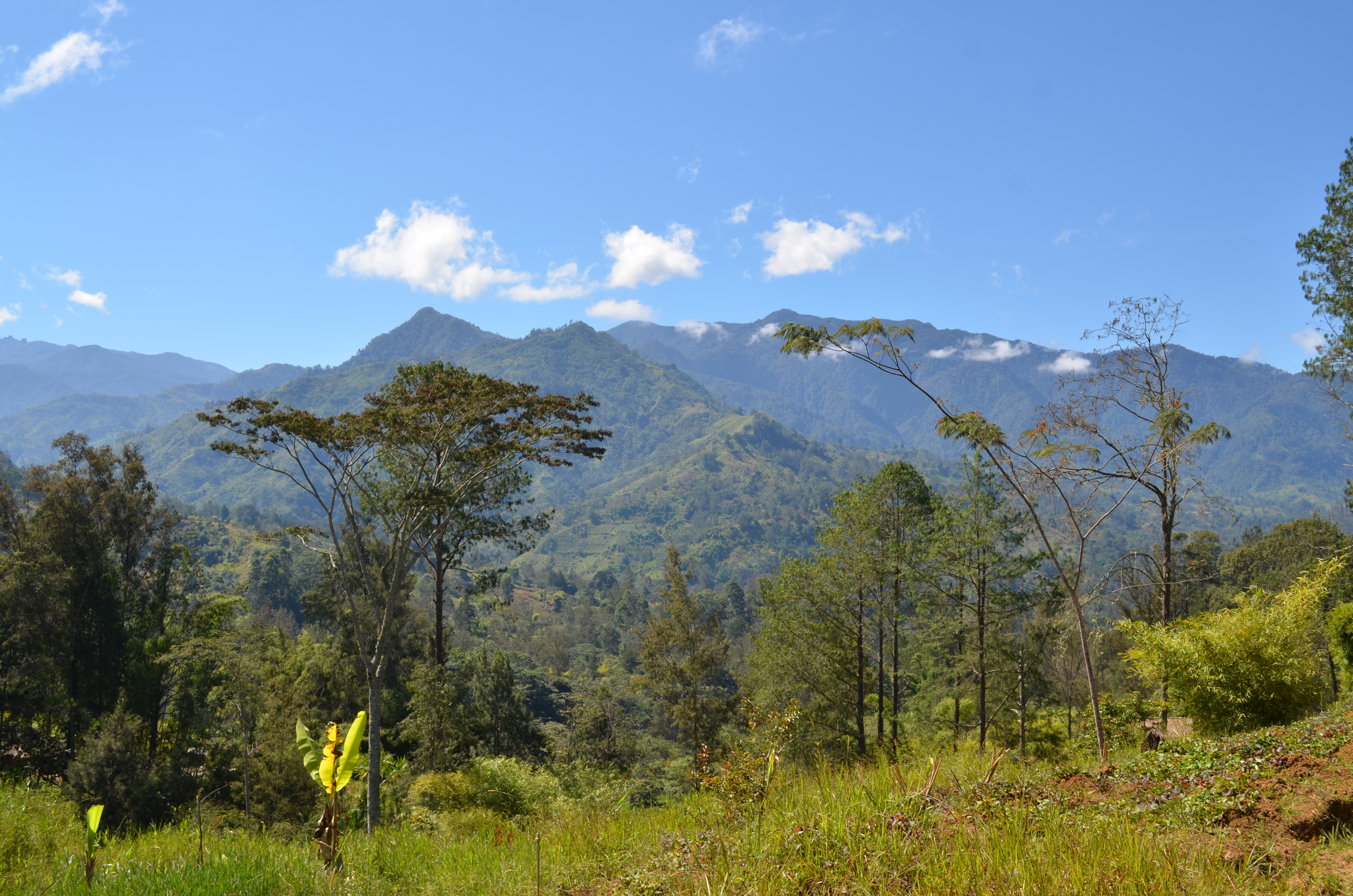
Papua New Guinea's highlands

Papua New Guinea is a megadiverse country, containing perhaps 5% of global biodiversity. It hosts 4.5% of known mammal diversity, and perhaps 30,000 vascular plant species.

A diverse variety of flora is found in the country, influenced by vegetation from Asia and Australia, and further varied by the country's rugged topography and distinct local climates. In areas heavily affected by human presence, Imperata and Themeda grasslands have formed. Cane grasses also grow in cleared areas, Miscanthus species in the highlands and Saccharum species in the lowlands. Such grasses often grow where land is left to fallow for 10 to 15 years.

Papua New Guinea is part of the Australasian realm, which also includes Australia, New Zealand, eastern Indonesia, and several Pacific island groups, including the Solomon Islands and Vanuatu.

The forest of New Guinea are the third-largest contiguous rainforest area in the world, containing rich biodiversity and increasing global climatic stability. Different floral assemblages can be broadly delineated by altitude into lowland, lower montane, upper montane, and alpine. These forests continue to provide important ecosystem services, food, and natural resources for many communities. Bushmeat from the forests was estimated to provide $26 million in value as of 2008. Over 500 plant species are also used as food. The official definition of "forest" as of 2014 is "Land spanning more than 1 hectare, with trees higher than 3 meters and the canopy cover of more than 10 percent", and these forests are officially classified into 13 natural types plus plantations. "Low altitude forest on uplands" makes up 31.30% of all forest, "Low altitude forest on plain and fans" 24.7%, and "Lower montane forest" 22.30%. Of all forest in 2018, over three-quarters was old-growth forest; 11.9% was heavily logged, and 0.2% had been logged at a small scale. 7.9% was affected by temporary farming or gardening.

Around 4,800 square kilometres (1,900 sq mi) of Mangroves stretch along the coast, and in the inland it is inhabited by nipa palm (Nypa fruticans), and deeper in the inland the sago palm tree inhabits areas in the valleys of larger rivers. Trees such as oaks, red cedars, pines, and beeches are becoming predominant in the uplands above 3,300 feet. Papua New Guinea is rich in various species of reptiles, indigenous freshwater fish and birds, but it is almost devoid of large mammals.

The country is part of the Malesia biogeographical area, with its plant species more similar to those of East Asia than Australasia, although there are exceptions, especially at higher altitudes. The Bougainville archipelago is biogeographically most closely related to the rest of the Solomon Islands archipelago, distinct from the rest of the country.

The complex geology and significant local variations in temperature, rainfall, and altitude mean the country has widely varying microclimates and numerous isolated habitats which host unique plant and animal assemblages. Broad classifications differentiate different coastal areas, the mountains, and different island groups as distinct.

Within Papua New Guinean rainforest, there are over 2,000 known species of orchids, around 2,00 species of ferns, over 700 birds, 600 reptiles and amphibians, and 300 mammals. The country is still believed to be the home of many undocumented species of plants and animals, with new species being regularly described. The western interior of the country is particularly poorly researched, although some taxa such as birds-of-paradise and bowerbirds are likely well-known. Different taxa have centres of endemism and diversity in different areas. For example, insect and lizard diversity is high north of the central mountain spine, marsupial, snake, and freshwater fish diversity is highest in areas south of the mountain spine such as the Fly lowlands, and frog diversity is generally highest in mountainous areas on the mainland and Bougainville (an exception being the highly diverse Huon peninsula).

Many faunal species on New Guinea are part of the same taxonomic groups as species on Australia. One notable feature in common for the two landmasses is the existence of several species of marsupial mammals, including some kangaroos and possums, which are not found elsewhere.

Three new species of mammals were discovered in the forests of Papua New Guinea by an Australian-led expedition in the early 2010s. A small wallaby, a large-eared mouse and a shrew-like marsupial were discovered. The expedition was also successful in capturing photographs and video footage of some other rare animals such as the Tenkile tree kangaroo and the Weimang tree kangaroo.

The large islands to the northeast are oceanic islands that have never been linked to New Guinea. As a consequence, they have their own flora and fauna; groups that are diverse on the mainland are often less so on the islands, and well-known mainland biota such as birds-and-paradise, bowerbirds, and monotremes are completely absent from these islands. The islands have their own significant endemic taxa, such as fruit bats and some frog groups. The distribution of various taxa, or lack of, is not well understood. It is likely a product of geological history as well as dispersal. Islands lying between the mainland Huon Peninsula and New Britain provide an avenue for some migration. The small islands to the southeast were possibly linked to the mainland in the past, and have similar wildlife.

Papua New Guinea is surrounded by at least 13,840 square kilometres (5,340 sq mi) of coral reefs, although more may be unmapped. These reefs form part of the biodiverse Coral Triangle.

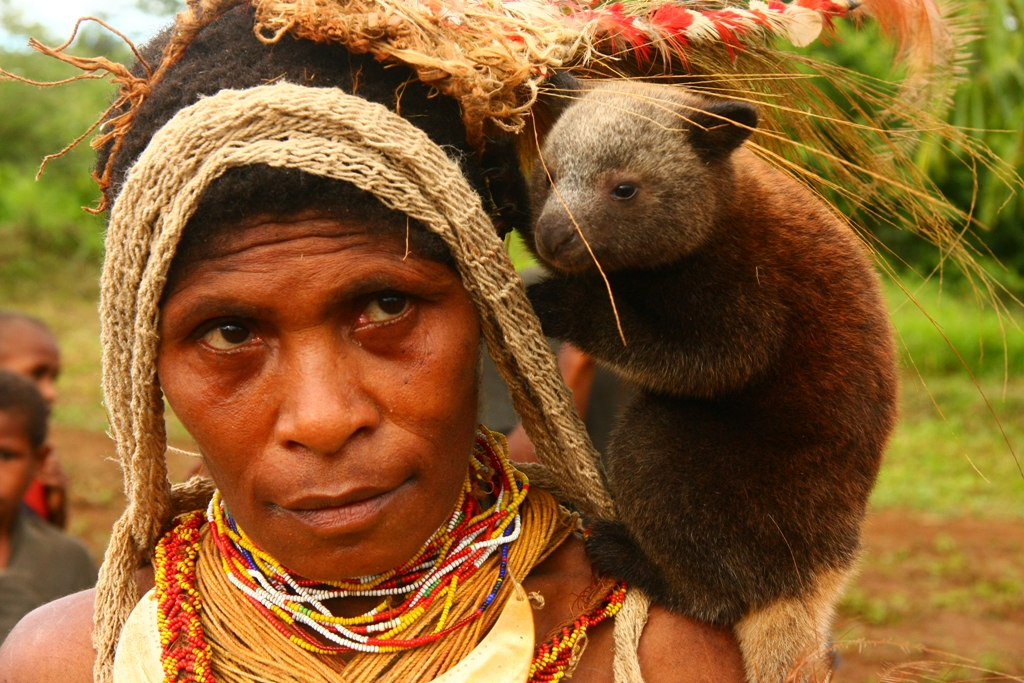
A tree-kangaroo in Papua New Guinea

Australia and New Guinea are portions of the ancient supercontinent of Gondwana, which started to break into smaller continents in the Cretaceous period, 65–130 million years ago. Australia finally broke free from Antarctica about 45 million years ago. All the Australasian lands are home to the Antarctic flora, descended from the flora of southern Gondwana, including the coniferous podocarps and Araucaria pines, and the broad-leafed southern beech (Nothofagus). These plant families are still present in Papua New Guinea. New Guinea is part of the humid tropics, and many Indomalayan rainforest plants spread across the narrow straits from Asia, mixing with the old Australian and Antarctic floras. New Guinea has been identified as the world's most floristically diverse island in the world, with 13,634 known species of vascular plants.

Nearly one-quarter of Papua New Guinea's rainforests were damaged or destroyed between 1972 and 2002, with around 15% being completely cleared. Up to a quarter of the forests are likely secondary forest, covering areas cultivated in the past. In these areas, cultivation cycles may include a fallow period of as long as 50 years. Clearing has turned a very small amount of forest area into savanna.

Papua New Guinea includes several terrestrial ecoregions:

- Admiralty Islands lowland rain forests – forested islands to the north of the mainland, home to a distinct flora.
- Central Range montane rain forests
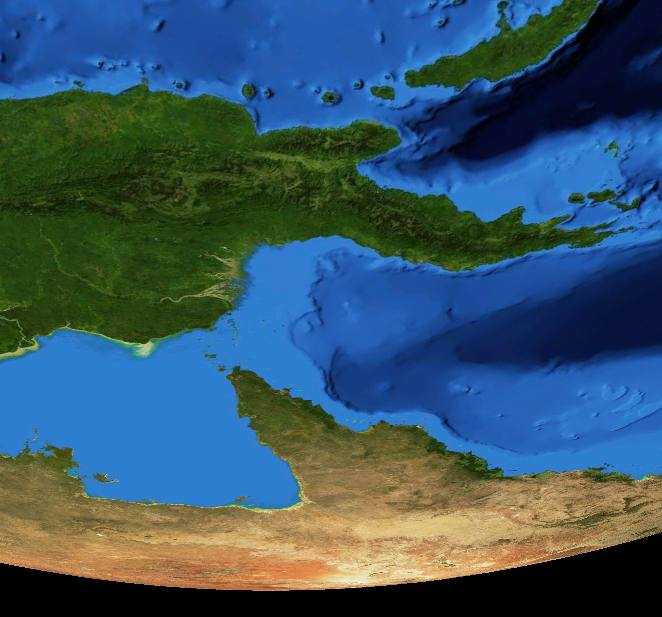
  Green tropical rainforest of Papua New Guinea bears a sharp contrast to nearby arid Australia.
- Huon Peninsula montane rain forests
- Louisiade Archipelago rain forests
- New Britain-New Ireland lowland rain forests
- New Britain-New Ireland montane rain forests
- New Guinea mangroves
- Northern New Guinea lowland rain and freshwater swamp forests
- Northern New Guinea montane rain forests
- Solomon Islands rain forests (includes Bougainville Island and Buka)
- Southeastern Papuan rain forests
- Southern New Guinea freshwater swamp forests
- Southern New Guinea lowland rain forests
- Trobriand Islands rain forests
- Trans-Fly savanna and grasslands
- Central Range sub-alpine grasslands

== Environmental issues ==
The rainforest is subject to deforestation as a result of growing commercial demand for tropical timber; forest clearance, especially in coastal areas, for plantations; pollution from mining projects. If the trend continues, more than half the forest that existed when Papua New Guinea became independent from Australia in 1975 will be gone by 2021.

=== Environment - international agreements ===
==== signed, but not ratified ====
- Antarctic-Environmental Protocol

==== signed and ratified ====
- Climate Change-Kyoto Protocol

== Extreme points ==
=== Extreme points ===
- Northernmost point – Sae Island 0° 45' 22 S, 145° 18' 33 E
- Northernmost point (main island) – Sandaun Province 2° 36' 11 S, 141° 03' 26 E
- Southernmost point – Vanatinai Rewe Point 11° 39' 17 S, 153° 33' 04 E
- Southernmost point (main island) – Near Suau, Samarai-Murua District 10° 42' 08 S, 150° 12' 07 E
- Westernmost point – Border with Indonesia, Western Province 6° 36' 45 S, 140° 50' 37 E
- Easternmost point – Nukumanu Islands, North Solomons 4°34' 39 S, 159° 29' 33 E
- Easternmost point (main island) – East Cape, Milne Bay 10° 13' 41 S, 150° 52' 39 E
- Highest point – Mount Wilhelm: 4,509 metres (14,793 ft)
- Lowest point – Pacific Ocean: 0 m (0 ft)

== See also ==
- List of rivers of Papua New Guinea
- List of volcanoes in Papua New Guinea
- List of highest mountains of New Guinea
- List of protected areas of Papua New Guinea
- Ecoregions of New Guinea
- Australia-New Guinea (continent)
