= Birger Mörner =

Swedish writer and collector

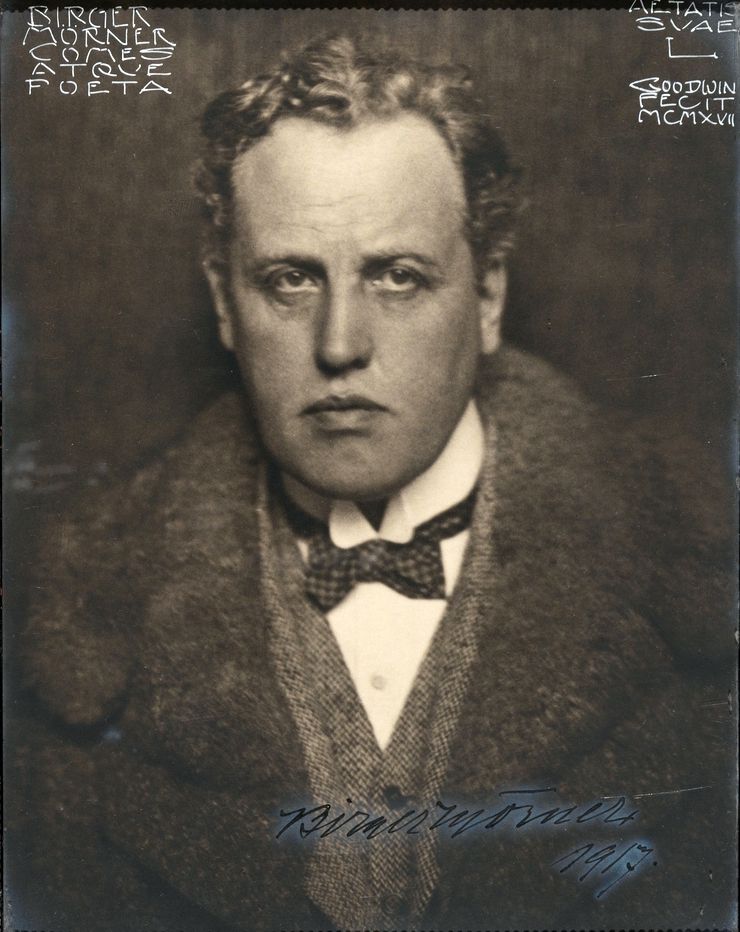
- Mörner in 1917
- Born: May 3, 1867
- Died: March 10, 1930 (aged 62)

Karl Birger Mörner (May 3, 1867 – March 10, 1930) was a Swedish diplomat, author, and book collector.

== Early life ==
Mörner studied at universities in Uppsala and Lund. He graduated with a law degree from the University of Uppsala in 1893 and began career as a civil servant.

== Career ==
He joined the Swedish-Norwegian Consulate General in Helsinki in 1899. He moved through positions in Genoa, Barcelona, Constantinople, and Sydney, Australia where he was the first career diplomat from Sweden, arriving in Australia in 1906. While in Australia he was foundational in the creation of the Wild Life Preservation Society of Australia and was a member of the Royal Zoological Society. He "discovered" a species of fish which ate mosquito larva, exported some of them to Italy and received a decoration from the King of Italy. He befriended many European inhabitants of German New Guinea and frequently traveled there while at his post.

Mörner was recalled in 1910 for opposing Scandinavian emigration which created furor in the press at the time. In response to the postcards by a group called 'The Immigration League of Australasia.' touting the benefits of the location, Mörner claimed that "the climate was absolutely unhealthy for Scandinavians, and that there is no country on earth where individual enterprise, work, and freedom of competition are so restricted by laws." The Sydney Evening News called him "a gentleman who might be a very good Consul, but a very poor immigrant." He returned home where he resumed writing, publishing two novels and collections of poems.

In 1912, he purchased Mauritzberg Castle. He wrote the novel Bråvallhus while residing there, a romantic version of the house's history. He sold the castle in 1918. He pursued travel writing and worked translating authors, including Jack London, into the Swedish language but was fired by his publisher for taking too many liberties with the original texts. He socialized with many European artists including August Strindberg, Adolf Paul, and Rainer Maria Rilke.

Mörner's works included poetry and historical novels and has been critiqued as having anti-semitic undertones.

== Mörner Collection ==
While in Australia, Mörner assembled "a rich ethnographic collection," took many photographs, and wrote a travelogue about his time there, Aráfis tropiska år in 1914. He traveled extensively to the islands of Wuvulu and Aua. While engaging in trading iron items for local artifacts, he was also somewhat critical of the German government "for their colonial intervention in the Pacific" and mildly lamented their encroachment into areas populated by indigenous people. As Germany moved into more of the area prior to World War One, Mörner returned home with over 1500 items. His collection was referred to in the press as "the last significant collection returned from German New Guinea before the fall of the colony during the First World War."

He collected many old, rare, and eye-catching books. His book collection is held at the Örebro University Library. It consists of approximately 8000 books including some incunabula. The collection of his materials also contains correspondence with many European culture personalities as well as photographs and paintings.

== Family and legacy ==
Mörner was married three times. The first time to Anna Elisabeth Brink in 1893 with whom he had three children; the couple divorced in 1908. The second time to Helene White in 1910; the couple divorced in 1913. The third time to Gertrud Anstrin with whom he had one child. He had four children including Latin American historian Magnus Mörner and book artist and opera singer Marianne Mörner.
