= Kaniet =

Kaniet may be,

- Kaniet Islands, Papua New Guinea
- Kaniet language spoken on the islands
