= Seimat language =

Western Admiralty Islands language

Seimat
- Native to: Papua New Guinea
- Region: Ninigo and Anchorite island groups, Manus Province
- Native speakers: (1,000 cited 1992)
- Language family: Austronesian: Malayo-Polynesian; Oceanic; Admiralty Islands; Western Admiralty Islands; Seimat

Language codes
- ISO 639-3: ssg
- Glottolog: seim1238

The Seimat language is one of three Western Admiralty Islands languages, the other two being Wuvulu-Aua and the extinct Kaniet. The language is spoken by approximately 1000 people on the Ninigo and the Anchorite Islands in western Manus Province of Papua New Guinea. It has subject–verb–object (SVO) word order.

== Names ==
The alternate names for Seimat are Admiralitäts-inseln and Ninigo.

== Phonology ==
=== Consonants ===
	Labial	Dental/ Alveolar	Velar	Glottal
Nasal	m	n	ŋ	
Stop	p	t̪	k	
Fricative		s	x	h
Lateral		l		
Approximant	w			

=== Vowels ===
	Front	Central	Back
High	i ĩ		u ũ
Mid	ɛ ɛ̃		ɔ ɔ̃
Low		a ã	

== Numbers ==
Seimat has a quinary numeral system; numbers from one to five are unique, whereas most all other numbers are simply combinations of these. For example, numbers from six to nine are compounds based on five, combined with the words for one to four. Twenty is also a unique word, meaning "person"; it presumably refers to a full set of fingers and toes.

Seimat	English
tehu	one
hũõhu	two
toluhu	three
hinalo	four
te-panim (lit. 'one hand')	five
te-panim tehu	six
te-panim hũohu	seven
te-panim toluhu	eight
te-panim hinalo	nine
hũõ-panim (lit. 'two hands')	ten
hũõ-panim tehu	eleven
hũõ-panim hũõhu	twelve
tolupa (lit. 'three hands')	fifteen
tolupa tehu	sixteen
tolupa hũõhu	seventeen
seilon tel (lit. 'one man')	twenty
seilon tel tehu	twenty-one
seilon tel hũõhu	twenty-two
seilon tolu	thirty
seilon hinalo	forty
patei tel	hundred
