= Wuvulu-Aua language =

Oceanic language spoken in Papua New Guinea

Wuvulu-Aua
- Native to: Papua New Guinea
- Region: Wuvulu and Aua Islands, Manus Province
- Native speakers: 1,600 (2015)
- Language family: Austronesian: Malayo-Polynesian; Oceanic; Admiralty Islands; Western Admiralty Islands; Wuvulu-Aua

Language codes
- ISO 639-3: wuv
- Glottolog: wuvu1239

The Wuvulu-Aua language is an Austronesian language which is spoken on the Wuvulu and Aua Islands and in the Manus Province of Papua New Guinea.

== Description ==
Although Wuvulu-Aua has a grammatical structure, word order, and tenses which are similar to other Oceanic languages, it has an unusually complex morphology. Wuvulu Island, in the Manus Province of Papua New Guinea, is about 10 feet (3.0 m) above sea level. Wuvulu and Aua Islands are part of the Admiralty Islands, part of the Bismarck Archipelago, which includes other provinces such as New Ireland, East New Britain, and Morobe. Wuvulu is spoken by an estimated 1,600 people in Manus Province; there are approximately 1,000 speakers of the language on Wuvulu, and 400 on Aua. The remaining speakers of Wuvulu inhabit other islands in Papua New Guinea.

Wuvulu is most similar to Austronesian, Malayo-Polynesian, and other Oceanic languages surrounding the Admiralty Islands. Wuvulu-Aua is one of only three languages in the Western subgroup of the Admiralty Islands languages. The other two languages are Seimat and Kaniet, the latter of which is now extinct.

There are three dialects of Wuvulu which are unique to the clans on the islands. The Onne and Auna dialects are spoken on Wuvulu, and the Aua dialect is spoken on Aua. Each dialect differs in phoneme, distinguishing them from one another. The islands of Wuvulu and Aua also have a lexical and phonological distinction.

== Classification ==
Wuvulu-Aua is part of the Austronesian language family. It also belongs to the Malayo-Polynesian language group, one of the major Austronesian language families. Based on location, Wuvulu-Aua is in the Eastern Malayo-Polynesian family. More specifically, it is part of the Oceanic Western Admiralty Island language family. Wuvulu-Aua is made up of two languages (Wuvulu and Aua), which vary in the pronunciation of consonants such as /r/.

== History ==
Most researchers believe that the Proto-Eastern Malayo Polynesian (PEMP) language originated in the Bird's Head Peninsula of northwestern New Guinea. PEMP developed different descendant languages; one was Proto-Oceanic (PO), which reached the northern coasts of New Guinea and Indonesia and Wuvulu. About thirty-one languages in the Admiralty subgroup of Oceanic languages are derived from PO; twenty-eight languages belong to the Eastern Admiralty subgroup, and three other languages (Wuvulu-Aua, Seimat, and the extinct Kaniet) belong to the Western Admiralty subgroup.

== Phonology ==
=== Vowels ===
Wuvulu-Aua has a small phoneme inventory, consisting of 20 phonemes. There are ten vowels (five vowels and five long counterparts) and 10 consonants. There are two front vowels (/i/ and /e/) and two back vowels (/o/ and /u/); /a/ is the only central vowel. High, mid, and low vowels are fairly even in terms of frequency; high vowels are the most frequent, and mid vowels are the least frequent.

Wuvulu's five long-vowel phonemes have the same phonetic quality as their standard-vowel counterparts, but are longer in duration. There are 20 possible diphthongs of the five basic vowels: eight falling pairs (/ia/, /ie/, /io/, /ea/, /ua/, /uo/, /ue/ and /oa/), eight rising pairs (/ai/, /au/, /ei/, /eu/, /oi/, /ou/, /ae/ and /ao/), and four level pairs: /iu/, /eo/, /ui/ and /oe/. The terms rising, falling and level refer to the rise (or fall) of the sonority of the diphthongs. Three vowel pairs common in other languages do not exist in Wuvulu: eo, oe, and ae. Previous research suggests that diphthongs are not phonemic in Wuvulu.

	Front	Central	Back
Close	i iː		u uː
Mid	e eː		o oː
Open		a aː	

=== Consonants ===
Sources about Wuvulu-Aua phonology disagree on the allophones of the phonemes /l/, /r/, and /t/. Blust varied the number of consonant phonemes: 14 in 1996 and 12 in 2008. Hafford reduced the consonant phonemes to 10 in 2012. Wuvulu-Aua contains four plosives: /p/, /b/, /t/, and /ʔ/. There are three approximants: /l/, /r/, and /w/. There is one fricative (/f/), which is usually voiceless; between vowels, however, it can become voiced. There are two nasals: /m/ and /n/. Wuvulu has no consonant clusters.

There are three consonants with possible allophones. /t/ has three allophones ([t], [s], and [tʃ]); /r/ has three allophones ([r], [x], and [g]), and /l/ has three allophones ([l], [d], and [lð]). All allophones are environmentally conditioned. The fricatives [f] and [x] are sometimes voiced intervocalically. The voiceless fricative /f/ is sometimes voiced: fafi -> [favi]. In rapid speech, the voiceless fricative /x/ is sometimes voiced: ere [exe] -> [eƔe]. The use of [r] is not conditioned by a phonological rule. Older speakers of Wuvulu-Aua speakers still use the [r] phone. The alveolar trilled [r] is also regularly used by older speakers, and is understood by children. [r] will generally be used, and [x] and [g] are uttered in complementary distribution (Hafford 2015, p. 38). If /l/ is adjacent to a [+high] vowel, /l/ will become a voiced alveolar stop: balu -> [badu] (child). Wuvulu has four plural pronouns; for each, /l/ can be deleted: ɁoɁolu -> ɁoɁou (Hafford 2015, p. 39). Conditioned variants [x] and [g] were proposed by Blust in 2008; this corrects Blust 1996, which proposed that [x], [g], [ɣ], and [k] are free variation phones. All dialects of Wuvulu-Aua claim that [k] is not a phone, since borrowed words from English replace [k] with ʔ.

	Labial	Alveolar	Velar	Glottal
Plosive	p b	t	(k)	ʔ
Nasal	m	n		
Fricative	f			
Trill		r		
Approximant	w	l	(w)	

=== Syllable structure ===
The syllable structure in Wuvulu is (C)V. The vowel is the nucleus of the syllable and can be a standard vowel, a long vowel, or a diphthong. The consonant is optional. All vowels hold one mora of weight; long vowels and diphthongs hold two moras of weight.

=== Stress ===
If a syllable in Wuvulu contains a long vowel or diphthong, it is considered "heavy"; long vowels and diphthongs are always stressed. A word ending with a short vowel has penultimate stress. Thus, lolo (sink) has penultimate stress because its final vowel is short in length. If a syllable ends with a long vowel or a diphthong, it has ultimate stress; rufu (my village) has ultimate stress because its final vowel is long.

== Morphosyntax ==
Proto-Oceanic is the ancestor of Wuvulu, and their grammatical structure is similar. Proto-Oceanic noun-phrase sentence structure is: art + (number/quantifier)+ noun + modifier + demonstrative. In Wuvulu, the noun-phrase sentence structure is (art/demonstrative) + (number/quantifier) + modifiers + noun + modifier.

=== Noun phrases ===
Like Proto–Oceanic, nouns are categorized as personal, local and common. Personal nouns are nouns related to the speaker, such as kinship terms or personal names. Local nouns are names of places. All other nouns are common nouns, such as 'tree'. This category also includes words like 'under' (a preposition).

Compounds, reduplication, and onomatopoeia are the three ways to construct nouns.

1. Compounds are the combination of two words to form a new word. For example, tawaparara ('spotted triggerfish') is formed from tawa ('table') and parara ('sea bird').
2. Waliwali ('driftwood') and wiliwili ('bicycle') are examples of reduplication.
3. Onomatopoeic words include baʔa [baʔa] or [baʔabaʔa] ('knock'), which mimics the sound of knocking on a door.

=== Verb phrases ===
Wuvulu has one verb with 20 morphemes (the smallest unit of meaning in a language), the most complicated single verb in the 500 Oceanic languages. Verbs can be attached by subject and object clitics and can have added mood, aspect, and completion.

Examples:

timi Timi=nia! Timi-na fei muro

'to throw'; 'throw it!' 'Throw the stone'

With an object marker, the verb root takes the transitive morpheme (-ca). When an intransitive verb changes to a transitive word, the marker fa- is added:

na-poni to na-fa-poni=a

'run' (transitive); 'make it run' (intransitive)

When a noun changes to a verb, the suffix -i is added to the word stem. If a verb is intransitive, the marker -fa makes it transitive.

=== Adverbs ===
Six adverbial morpheme prefixes describe verbs: complete, frequent, infrequent, eventual, intensified, and sequential.

- The marker -mina describes actions performed completely.
- The marker ʔu- describes actions performed frequently.
- The marker ʔo- describes actions performed infrequently.
- The marker we- describes actions performed eventually.
- The marker poʔo describes actions performed with strong emotion.
- The marker loʔo describes actions performed before other actions.

Wuvulu also has adverbial suffixes:

- The marker -ʔua describes actions performed within a limit, similar to only in English.
- The markers -liai (intransitive) and -li-na (transitive) describe actions performed repeatedly.

=== Verbal clitics ===
Pronominal clitics in Wuvulu are modified forms of pronouns which are bound to a verb stem. Verbal clitics can be used as subjects, objects of a clause, or co-located in a clause with noun phrases.

=== Subject proclitics ===
Wuvulu is one of the few languages with a similar structure for subject proclitics, previously thought to be exclusive to Proto-Oceanic (PO).

Person	PO	Wuvulu
First	*au=	ʔu=
Second	*ko=	ʔo=
Third	*i=	ʔi=

=== Clause structure ===
Clause structure is categorized as verbal or verbless. A verbless clause is constructed with two nouns which are close together. In this kind of sentence, a pause (【，】) separates the subject and predicate; an example is ia, futa ('He, (is a) chef'). According to Foley and Van Valin (1984) and Van Valin and LaPolla (1997), verbal clauses can be described with one model: [ Clause [ Adjunct ] [ Core [Nucleus] ] Adjunct. For example:

minoa, ʔei wawane, ro=na-paʔuru-paʔa-a ʔei aʔu, ʔi ʔari
'Yesterday the men caught the tuna at sea.'

According to the model above:

[ Clause [ Adjunct ] [ Core [Nucleus] ] Adjunct
[ [ yesterday ] [ the men ] [ they=caught ] the tuna] at sea

==== Syntax ====
Wuvulu, like the other 30 languages in the Admiralty Islands language family, is a subject–verb–object (SVO) language. It also tends towards verb–object–subject syntax, however, because of its similarity to Proto-Oceanic (where verbal-agreement marking and its propensity for the subject are at the end of the sentence).

==== Verbless clauses ====
The predicate nominal is formed by two close noun phrases. The first noun phrase is usually the subject, and the second is the predicate; for example, ia, fatu ("He is a chief").

The predicate locative is formed when a noun is followed by a location noun; for example, ai, iei ("He is there").

==== Verbal clauses ====
Existential clauses express the existence of something by using the verb paʔi, equivalent to there is in English. Declarative clauses are used to denote a situation. (Note: realis and irrealis mood will be used.) For example, ʔi=na-biri-ʔia ("He did it").

Imperative clauses are a sentence without a subject, but a second-person subject is assumed; for example, mi-to=nia! ("Come get it!")

Deontic clauses are similar to imperative clauses, but in a command form; for example, amuʔou=nei-ʔaunu! ("You must leave!")

=== Verbal morphology ===
Wuvulu has one of the most complex morphologies of the Oceanic languages. Unlike Proto-Oceanic, Wuvulu does not use morphological derivation; it gets verb derivation from nouns and adjectives, and transitive verbs from intransitive verbs.

Deriving a verb from noun creates a sentence that means 'to be [noun or adjective]' when adding -i. When the suffix is combined with the fa- prefix, the meaning of the sentence can be changed to 'to cause/let something become [noun or adjective]'.

Example: fei muro
'the stone'
ʔi=na-muro-i
'It is stone.'
ʔi=na-fa-muro-i-na larua
'She turned the two to stone.'

Intransitive verbs are formed from transitive verbs by adding the causative marker -fa: ʔi=na-poni
'He ran.'
ʔi=na-fa-poni=a
'She made it run.'

==== Transitive verbs ====
Transitive verbs can be derived from adjectives by adding the causative marker -fa: ʔi=na-fa-rawani=nia
'He treated her well.'

ʔi=na-fa-afelo=ia
'He destroyed it (literally, caused it to be bad).'

==== Preverbal morphology ====
"Preverbal morphemes within the Wuvulu verb phrase, consist of positions for subject clitics, and inflectional prefixes denoting mood/aspect and direction".

Example: (SUBJECT=) (MOOD/ASPECT-) (DIRECTION-) VERB (-ADVERBIAL) (=OBJECT) (-DIRECTIONAL)

The Oceanic language family tends to have preverbal morphemes which are free or prefixed. Pre-verbal and post-verbal morphemes are bound in Wuvulu by the verb stem, however, except for subjects and objects (which can be free nominals, verbal clitics, or both).

==== Mood ====
Like Proto-Oceanic, Wuvulu lacks verbal tense; however, it uses mood, aspect markers, and time phrases to convey tense.

Realis mood conveys past tense. (na-)

ro=na-biri=ʔia
'They did it.'

An irrealis mood does not convey past tense.

ro=ʔa-biri=ʔia
'They are about to do it.'

=== Demonstratives ===
Demonstratives (spatial deixis) are used to position tangible objects or persons with speech-act participants. Articles and third-person pronouns are related to demonstratives in a number of languages. Variations include temporal deixis, but spatial deixis are an essential element of communication. To interpret deixis, context must be considered.

Wuvulu has demonstrative identifiers determining spatial position relative to the speaker. This is expressed by three forms essential to determine the position in space of the subject, a concept inherited from Proto-Oceanic. According to the table, the sequences ʔeni 'close', ʔena 'far', and ʔei 'unspecified' use distance in relation to the speaker.

Type		Demonstratives			Articles
Distance		close	far	unspecified	n/a
Singular	Animate	meni	mena	mei	emea
Singular	Inanimate	feni	fena	fei	epalo
Plural		ʔeni	ʔena	ʔei	efiʔa
Definiteness		definite			indefinite

Oceanic languages generally distinguish proximal, intermediate, and distal forms, but the distinction varies by language. Loniu, a language spoken on Manus island (a neighboring island in the Bismarck Archipelago), has a two-way contrast and is one of the closest geographic neighbors of Wuvulu and Aua. The following table has the glossed translations of each plural form, including the distance of each spatial deictic.

Distance	Near	Far	Unspecified
Demonstrative	ʔeni	ʔena	ʔei
Gloss	these	those	the

The plural demonstrative ʔei marks plurality (people, as opposed to a person) at an unspecified distance:

ʔei ramaʔa na-uri pafo wa
'The people boarded the ship.'

Spatial deixis can be seen from speaker to hearer, referring to proximity in space. This can be seen in ʔeni piʔu na paʔa weʔai
'These stars are very bright.'

ʔeni signifies that a particular constellation of stars is closer than another, unspecified constellation.

In
ʔena piʔu na weʔai
'Those stars are bright,'

ʔena (the plural demonstrative) indicates distance; 'those' stars are farther than another, undefined, group of stars. This distinction occurs in English with words like that or those, and Oceanic languages often have similar patterns of semantic organization.

Singular demonstrative identifiers and articles are also modified by animation, indicating whether an object is inanimate or animate. Plural identifiers of demonstratives do not account for animation, which is limited to humans or spiritual beings (or deities) with personality.

meni ʔama
'this father'

feni wa
'this canoe'

This distinction is independent of distance:

mena ʔama
'that father'

fena wa
'that canoe'

fena ʔama
'the father'

fei wa
'the canoe'

Distance	close	far	unspecified
singular animate	meni	mena	fena
singular inanimate	feni	fena	fei

These distinctions allow the hearer to determine animation and spatial position.

==== Functions ====
===== Referents =====
Demonstratives in Wuvulu can be referents, surrounding a noun phrase (NP) as the focus of a sentence:

meni ramaʔa meni, na-lalai minoa
'this (particular) person married yesterday'

===== Pronouns =====
Demonstratives may also function as pronouns in NPs. They are in a phrase-initial position, with an adjectival modifier before the head noun, when they were phrase-final. mena is the object of the verb in:

Ro=nei-no-lura-mi mena
'They must fetch that (person).'

They can also be used after a verb with the third-person subject clitic ʔi (singular) or ro (plural):

ʔi=na-no-mai fena
'That (thing) came.'

ro=na-no-mai ʔena
'Those (people or things) came.'

Pronominal demonstratives are not used often, since they are complex and have limited applications.

===== Adverbial demonstratives =====
Demonstratives can also act as adverbs to highlight the location of verbs. Adverbs provide additional information about a situation, such as location. ʔi 'at' (prepositional) and iei 'there' indicate location:

ʔi=na-ʔau=ria ieni
'He put it here.'

Ro=nei-ʔule iei
'They must stay there.'

Ro=nei-ʔule iena
'They must stay there (distant)'

The prepositional ʔi is used before a locational form to indicate closeness.

=== Negation ===
Wuvulu negation may be divided into verbal negation and clausal negation. Verbal negation takes the form of an inflectional morpheme. It occurs in the pre-stem position of the verb, between the subject marker and the verb stem. The negation marker occurs between the mood and aspect markers.

Pre-stem position of Wuvulu verbs
mood	negation	aspect	adverbial information	direction

The Wuvulu negation marker has one of two forms: 'a- or ta-. The form 'a- always occurs after nei-, resulting in the form nei'a 'must not'. Below is an example of nei'a negating a verb: oma'oma'a fei tala ba ro-nei'a-we-no-'ua-mai
'Watch the road so that they do not just come [and surprise us].'

ta- is used with the irrealis mood after the irrealis marker 'a-, for situations which were expected to occur but have not.
i-mina-1apa'a manumanu i-'a-ta-we-no-mai hinene
'He knows things that have not yet occurred (has the ability to predict).'

It also commonly occurs with the eventuality marker we-, resulting in tawe, for events that have not happened yet; ta- refers to events which have not happened.

Verbal negation markers
'a-	Follows deontic marker nei-
ta-	Occurs with irrealis mood

Clausal negation in Wuvulu can be divided into clausal (negation of a clause) and constituent (negation of a constituent of a clause). In clausal negation, the word lomi occurs before the negated clause: Lomi lagu-na-bigi-bigi suta taro garden
'The two were not working the taro garden.'

lomi can also be a negator in constituent negation, as can the word aba. In both cases, the word occurs directly before the constituent being negated: Lomi na-'aida hara-na, yoi ma'ua meni Beatau 'You do not know his name, but this is Beatau.'

A negated clause using aba is often coordinated by the conjunction ua as a contrastive positive clause. Examples of aba with and without this contrastive clause are: agu-a-di-poni aba tafi-u meni ua hani'u
'Let's leave. This isn't my sister, but (a) devil.'

ma agia aba ale- 'ei
'But no—it's not like that.'

Clausal and constituent negation are frequently used to express negative conditions, as seen twice below: ma naba lomi lagu-na-fi-siba-i lagu ei fi-tafi lomi i-ma-mara fei Haua
'And if they hadn't been cross (the two sisters), Haua wouldn't have been created.'

Although the word lo’e appears to occur in free variation with lomi, Hafford wrote that this may require further research before it is confirmed.

=== Possession ===
Possession in Wuvulu can be indicated in two ways: by a possessor suffix attached to the head noun of a noun phrase, or by juxtaposing noun phrases. The head noun always precedes the possessive marker, whether the possessor is indicated by a suffix or a juxtaposed noun phrase. Possessed nouns, as in other Oceanic languages, are classified by indirect or direct possession (similar to alienable or inalienable possession, respectively), with indirectly possessed nouns divided into three categories.

==== Possessor suffixes ====
A possessor suffix differs by whether the possessor is first, second or third person. It is only used when there is a single possessor, not for something like "their farm" (where their indicates two or more people).

For a possessor suffix to be applied to an indirectly possessed noun, there are three possessum nouns (classifiers) which must be used in the place of an explicit reference to the indirectly possessed object. The classifiers correspond to three categories of objects: ana for edible things, numa for drinkable things, and ape for general indirect possession. According to Hafford (1999), "These classifiers act as nouns ... taking quantifiers, articles and bound agreement suffixes." The possessor suffixes attach to a directly possessed noun or a classifier noun corresponding to an indirectly possessed object (e.g. 'your taro' = 'your edible thing' = ana-mu). That is, indirectly possessed nouns can only take a possessor suffix when they are represented by a possessum noun. According to Hafford (2015), "The suffixed possessum noun is optionally followed by a more specific alienable noun as in, ana-u, fulu 'my food, taro'".

Directly possessed nouns include body parts (except for genitalia) and names, as well as direct objects such as "familiar places (e.g. one's umu 'house') and indispensable objects such as wa 'canoe' and walu 'bush knife'." Possessor suffixes are also applied to kinship terms such as 'mother' ʔama, 'father' ʔina, and 'child' ʔupu. Genitalia take the general indirect possessum noun ape, contrary to other body parts which are considered directly possessed. This may be due to modesty, allowing a speaker to refer to genitalia without specifying a particular body part.

Possession suffixes
Possessor person	Suffix
First	-u
Second	-mu
Third	-na

Hara 'name' is a directly possessed noun with the first-person suffix:

Hara-u Wawa ('My name is Wawa.')

Second-person affixation uses the directly possessed noun bigia, 'work':

Tamanu bigi-a-mu ('What is your work?')

The third-person possessor suffix is applied to the possessum noun for edible things:

Heia arewa Barafi inabigi'a ei hana-na ('One day Barafi prepared his food.')

==== Juxtaposed noun phrases ====
Possession (by one or more possessors) can be indicated by the juxtaposition of noun phrases. When indirectly possessed nouns are represented by a possessum noun, "the classifier precedes the possessor noun phrase as in hape lagua 'possession of theirs'":

Lagu-na-pa'i hepalo hape lagua.

'The two had a possession of theirs.'

This method can be applied to direct and indirect possession. The possessed noun phrase precedes the possessor noun phrase, and several layers of possession can be embedded into one phrase. An example of this layering of possession in English is "the house of the son of the doctor" (the doctor, in "the son of the doctor", and the son in "the house of the son" are possessors). An example in Wuvulu is:

Inatosiminia pafo pe'i fei agi'agi ei suta.

'He threw it on the bank of the ditch of the swamp.'

== Vocabulary ==
The Wuvulu phonemic inventory consists of 10 consonants, 10 vowels, and 10 diphthongs. Wuvulu diphthongs separate vowels phonetically, despite the fact that the spoken vowels create one sound. The vowel "a" is the most common, appearing one-third of the time. Wuvulu has two numerical systems: one for animate objects, and one for inanimate objects. Both systems are senary (base-6); the numbers following six are multipliers of six. The number for two inanimate objects is ruapalo, and the number for two animate objects is elarui. Several basic words are stable and change little, including the words for 'blood' (rara), 'stone' (muro) and 'the sun' (alo).

Number	Wuvulu
1	ai/e
2	rua, roa
3	olu
4	fa
5	aipani
6	oluroa
7	olorompalo/oloromea
8	fainaroa
9	faimapalo/faimea
10	efua

Each number equal to or less than four is representative of the Proto-Oceanic language. Numbers above four are a multiplicative construct, also found in the Marshall Islands. The number 'five' in Wuvulu is aipani. Ai is 'one' in Wuvulu, and pani means 'hand'. A hand has five fingers, and 'one hand' is aipani. For larger numbers, the system becomes more complex. Fainaroa means 'eight'. When the word is broken down, fai means 'four'; na is 'multiply', and roa is 'two' ('four multiplied by two').

People and locations addressed use proper nouns, with the morpheme o- added as a prefix to any name. This prefix can also be used for pronouns, such as addressing a relative as "auntie", "sister", or "mother".

Wuvulu family names can be based on a patriarch or clan name. Some family names are based on locations, due to settlers associating locations with clan names.
