= Sae Island =

Island of the Bismarck Archipelago, Papua New Guinea

Sae
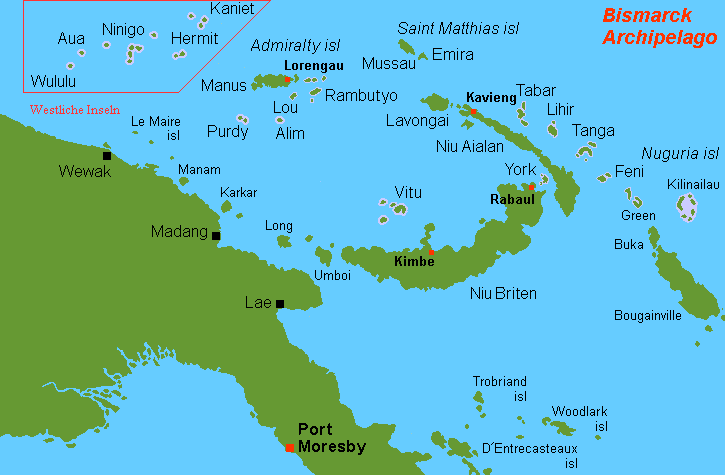
- Location of Sae and Kaniet Islands at top left

Geography
- Location: Papua New Guinea
- Coordinates: 0°47′S 145°17′E
- Archipelago: Western Islands, Bismarck Archipelago

Administration
- Papua New Guinea
- Region: Islands
- Province: Manus

Sae Island is the northernmost island within the Western Islands of the Bismarck Archipelago, Papua New Guinea. It is located just north-west of the Kaniet Islands, under which it is often subsumed, although the two are distinct. Another name for the Kaniet(-Sae) Islands is "Anchorite Islands".

The first sighting of Wuvulu Island by a European was by the Spanish navigator Iñigo Órtiz de Retes on 27 July 1545, while on board the carrack San Juan and returning from Tidore to New Spain. He charted this island together with the nearby islands, Aua and Manu, as La Barbada (meaning "the bearded island" in Spanish).
