= Nabetari =

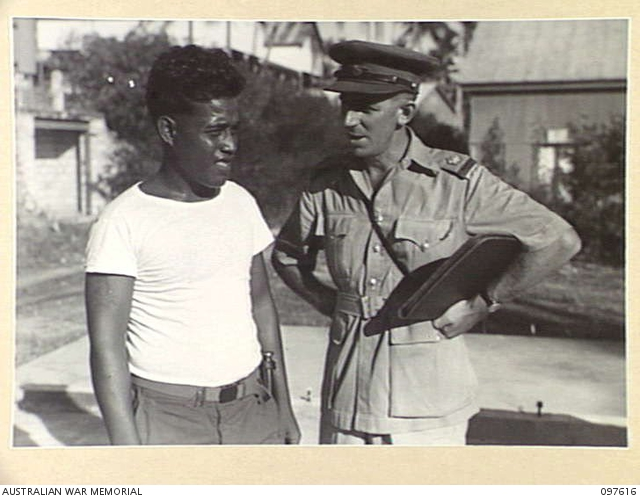
Nabetari in 1945

Nabetari is a Gilbertese (Pacific Islands) native who impressed several senior Allied officers with his successful attempt on or about 4 April 1944 to escape from the Japanese occupation of the Gilbert Islands during the Second World War.

The voyage began when Nabetari and a six other natives set from their home island of Banaba, but shortly later the other canoes disappeared after a storm, leaving only Nabateri and his friend Reuera, the latter of whom later died of a shark bite later on. Nabateri's diet relied solely on fishing and drank rain and shark blood to survive. Nabetari made a record ocean voyage in a small fishing canoe to the Gilbert Islands, about 240 miles to the east. In November, after seven months on the ocean, he was washed up on the reef of the Ninigo Islands close to Manus, the largest of the Admiralty Islands archipelago. He was later flown to Tarawa to provide information about the Japanese troops on the Nauru. Nabetari covered a total of 1,500 miles during his escape.
