= Richard Brookes =

English physician and author

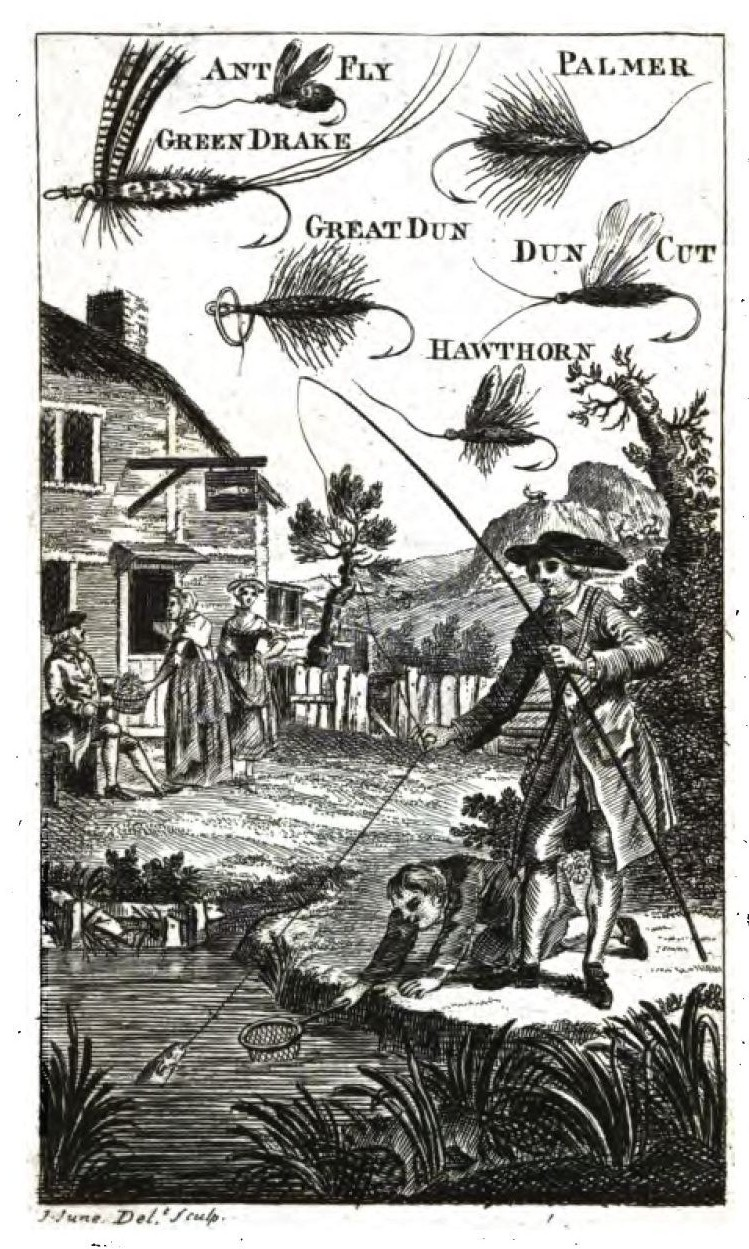
Frontispiece from the 1790 edition of The Art of Angling.

Richard Brookes (fl. 1721 – 1763) was an English physician and author of compilations and translations on medicine, surgery, natural history, and geography, most of which went through several editions.

== Life ==
He was at one time a rural practitioner in Surrey (Dedication of Art of Angling). At some time previous to 1762 he had travelled both in America and Africa (Preface to Natural History).

== Works ==
His General Gazetteer (1762) filled a gap in the market and went through many editions, up to that of Alexander George Findlay in the later nineteenth century. Other works were:

- History of the most remarkable Pestilential Distempers, 1721.
- The Art of Angling, Rock and Sea Fishing, with the Natural History of River, Pond, and Sea Fish, 1740.
- The General Practice of Physic, 1751.
- An Introduction to Physic and Surgery, 2 vols. 1754.
- A System of Natural History, 6 vols. 1763. Includes Volume 5, known in the early history of palaeontology. In this volume Brookes noted a bone, known previously to Robert Plot, and now identified as coming from Megalosaurus; found in a quarry at Cornwell, Oxfordshire, it is known as the "Cornwell bone". Brookes named the creature from which it came Scrotum Humanum in 1763, referring to anatomical similarities with the human scrotum.

His main translations are The Natural History of Chocolate (1724), from the French Histoire Naturelle du Cacao et du Sucre (1719) of Quelus (de Chélus), 2nd ed. 1730; and Jean-Baptiste Du Halde's History of China, 4 vols. 1736.

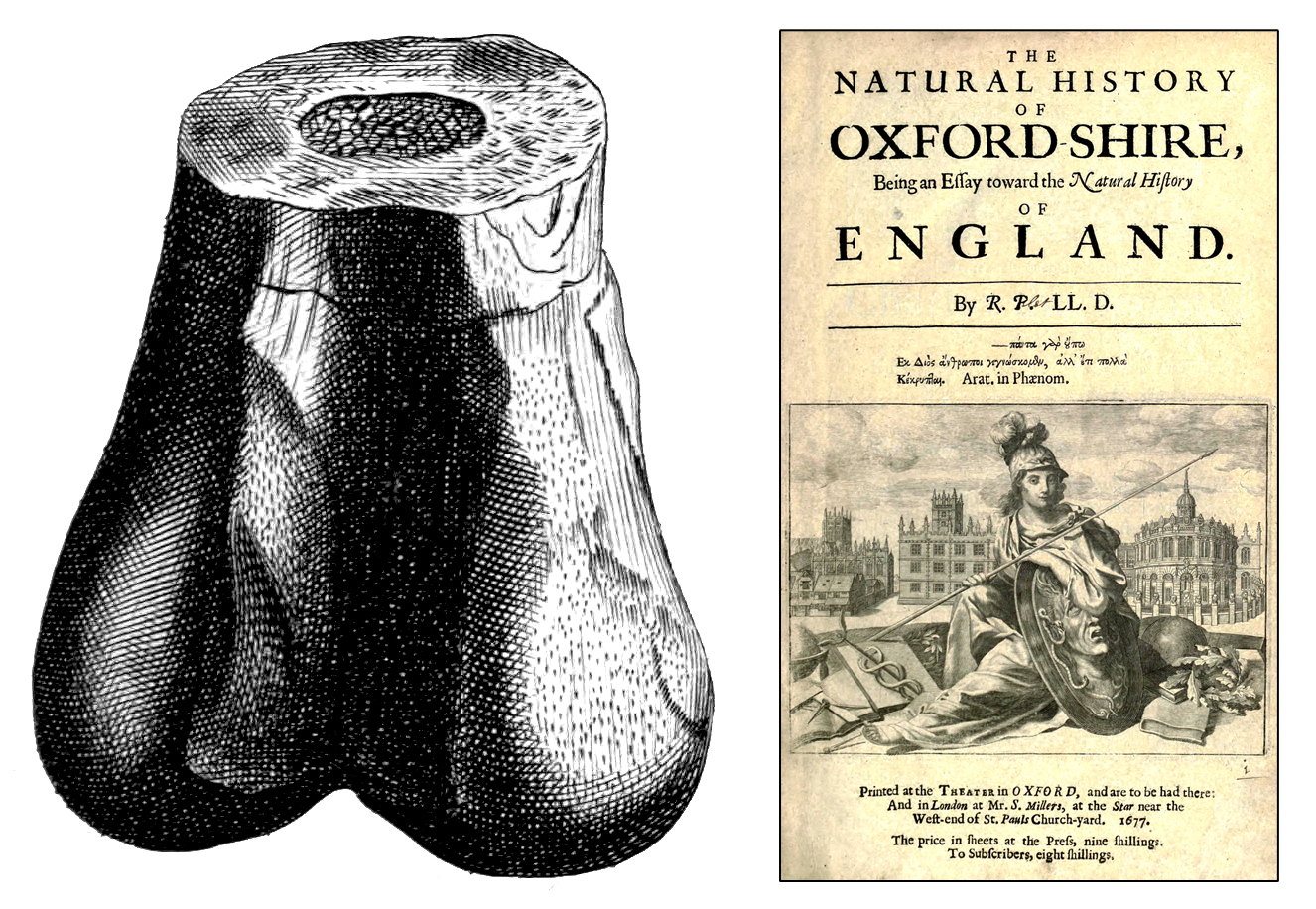
The bone Brookes used to name Scrotum humanum, with Robert Plot's work in which it had been described in 1676.
