= Western Islands, Papua New Guinea =

Western Islands
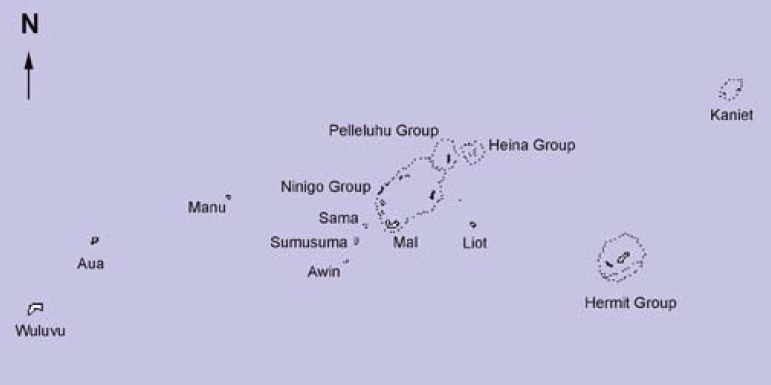
- Map of the Western Islands

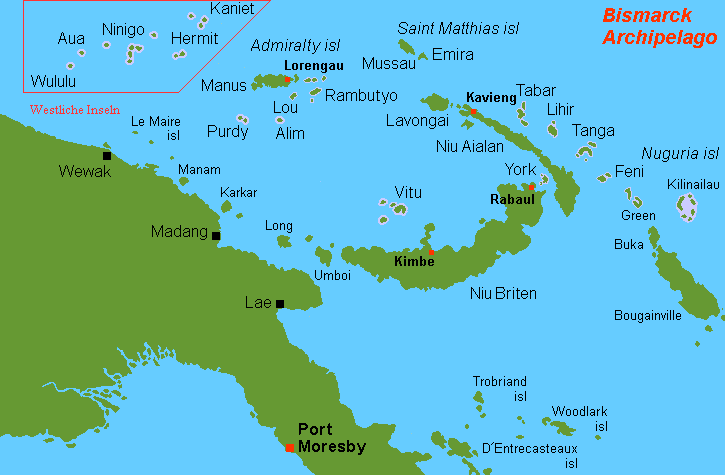
- Location of the Western Islands in the Bismarck Archipelago

Geography
- Location: Papua New Guinea
- Coordinates: 1°30′S 143°00′E
- Archipelago: Bismarck Archipelago
- Major islands: Aua, Wuvulu

Administration
- Papua New Guinea
- Region: Islands Region
- Province: Manus Province

The Western Islands are a group of islands in the Bismarck Archipelago, and within Manus Province of the Islands Region, in northern Papua New Guinea.

== Geography ==
They are located north and west of Manus Island off the northeastern coast of New Guinea island in the Bismarck Sea of the Southwestern Pacific Ocean.

The Western Islands' tropical rainforests include several distinct ecoregions.

=== Islands ===
Islands in the group include:

- Aua Island
- Hermit Islands
- Kaniet Islands (Anchorite Islands)
  - Sae Island
- Ninigo Islands
- Wuvulu Island

== See also ==
- Archipelagoes of Papua New Guinea
- Bismarck Archipelago topics
