= Wuvulu Island =

Island in Papua New Guinea

Coordinates: 01°44′S 142°51′E

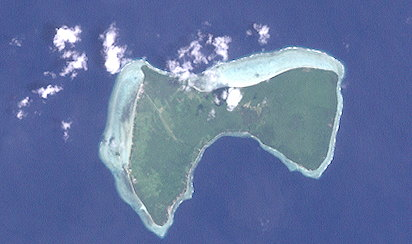
Satellite image of Wuvulu Island

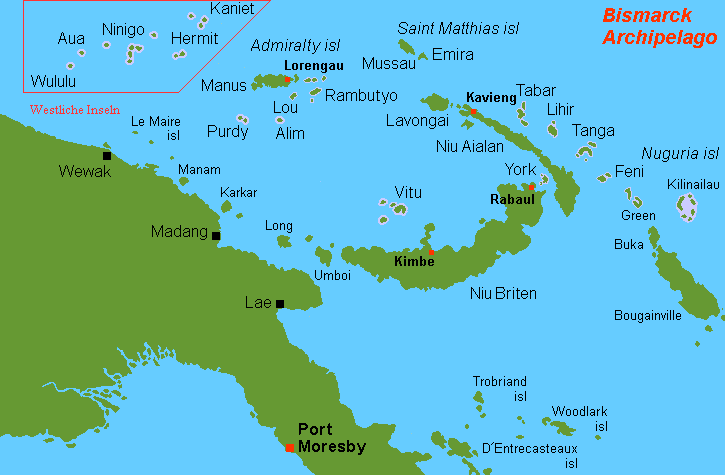
Location of Wuvulu Island at top left (as "Wululu")

Wuvulu Island (also known as Mary Island, Matty, Maty Island, Tiger Island, Tiger-Inseln and Wuwulu) is part of the Western Islands of the Bismarck Archipelago in the western Pacific Ocean, part of Manus Province, Papua New Guinea. It is the westernmost island of the thirteen island groups that make up the archipelago. It is an island of volcanic origin encircled by a coral reef with a maximum height of three meters (10 feet) above sea level.

People on the island speak the Wuvulu-Aua language, a Western Admiralty Islands language, which is of Austronesian stock.

The first sighting of Wuvulu Island by a European was by the Spanish navigator Iñigo Órtiz de Retes on 27 July 1545, while on board the carrack San Juan and returning from Tidore to New Spain. He charted this island together with the nearby islands, Aua and Manu, as La Barbada (meaning "the bearded island" in Spanish).

Wuvulu Island was part of German New Guinea until the First World War. During German times, the island was purchased by the German Administration, which excluded from the purchase three areas for ‘native reserves’. Two of these reserves were at the western end of the Island and the third was at the eastern end. The latter area was known as Ruvuraue (230 hectares, 568 acres).

In 1907 the German Administration transferred the property known as Agita (800 hectares, 2170 acres) to Rudolph Wahlen – the property was all of the island with the exception of the three reserves. The German Administration, however, also gave a restricted occupancy to Wahlen over Ruvuraue Reserve.

In 1912 the area known as Ruvuraue appears to have been transferred to Rudolph Wahlen. This was apparently in return for the granting to the local people of certain rights to taro pits on the properties. The reserve aspect of this land would have been extinguished by this action. Both titles were made the subject of encumbrances relating to mining and to transfer back to the Administration for landing places and other public purposes.

After the First World War the title vested in the custodian of expropriated property. In 1928 a draft certificate of title was issued in respect of both parties.

== See also ==
- Wuvulu-Aua language
