= Pharology =

Scientific study of lighthouses and signal lights

Pharologist Dan Spinella in the lantern room of the Cape Hatteras Lighthouse in Buxton, North Carolina

Pharology is the scientific study of lighthouses and signal lights, their construction and illumination. The variation pharonology is occasionally attested. Those who study or are enthused by lighthouses are known as pharologists.

== Origin of term ==
The term originally began as pharonology and is prevalent in many 1840s papers on the study of lighthouses. The term stems from the classical Latin or its ancient Greek etymon Pharos, meaning lighthouse (Pharos was also the proper name of the famed lighthouse of Alexandria) and the Greek root “logos" (a word or discourse) in John Purdy's The Colombian Navigator; Or, Sailing Directory for the American Coasts and the West-Indies. It was again used in Purdy's The New Sailing Directory for the Strait of Gibraltar and the Western Division of the Mediterranean Sea: Comprehending the Coasts of Spain, France, and Italy, from Cape Trafalgar to Cape Spartivento, the Balearic Isles, Corsica, Sardinia, Sicily and the Maltese Islands, with the African Coast, from Tangier to Tripoli, Inclusive ... Improved, by Considerable Additions, to the Present Times. The term's usage was recognized in The Nautical Magazine: A Journal of Papers on Subjects Connected with Maritime Affairs, Volume 13 as "bestowing a passing notice... which has for some time cut a figure, sublime or ridiculous, in our books of sailing directions".

The term, pharology, first appeared in the Transactions of the Royal Society of Arts of London in 1847 and credited its coinage as "being first introduced by the late Mr [John] Purdy". A description and list of the lighthouses of the world, 1861 also makes the same claim noting that the term is used to describe the study of modern lighthouses from the 1800s. The term also comes from Pharos.

== As a study ==
In the 1860s the term's usage was equated to lighthouse engineering including the structure and optical systems used in the lighthouses. More recently, pharology has re-appeared as an obscure or niche area of expertise that focuses on lighthouses and signal lights that surpass hobby interests. Patrick Barkham of The Guardian noted the association with trainspotters, but Vikki Gilson of Trinity House noted that a wide spectrum of interest in lighthouses is shared by both young and old.

== Notable pharologists ==
- John Purdy, coiner of the term
- Princess Anne, the Princess Royal
- Douglas Hague
- F. Ross Holland
- Thomas Stevenson, father of Robert Louis Stevenson
- Kenneth Sutton-Jones
- Ken Trethewey
- Peter Williams
- Chris Mills
- Dan Spinella
