= Alexander George Findlay =

English geographer and hydrographer

- Born: 1812; London, England, United Kingdom
- Died: 1875 (aged 62–63); Dover, England, United Kingdom
- Occupations: Geographer, hydrographer

Alexander George Findlay (1812–1875) was an English geographer and hydrographer. His services to geography have been compared with those of Aaron Arrowsmith and August Heinrich Petermann.

== Life ==
Findlay was born in London, 6 January 1812, a descendant of the Findlays of Arbroath, Forfarshire. His grandfather was a shipowner there, who moved his business to the River Thames. Findlay's father, Alexander Findlay was one of the original fellows of the Royal Geographical Society.

The son Alexander George Findlay devoted himself to the compilation of geographical and hydrographical works. On the death of John Purdy, the hydrographer, in 1843, he took a leading position. In 1844 he was elected a fellow of the Royal Geographical Society, and was a member of its council and committees. His researches in meteorology attracted the attention of Robert FitzRoy.

On the death of Richard Holland Laurie of Laurie & Whittle, the London geographical and print publisher, in 1858, Findlay took over the business. In 1885, when Van Keulen of Amsterdam, founded in 1678, was dissolved, it became the oldest active firm in Europe for the publication of charts and nautical works.

Findlay died at Dover on 3 May 1875.

== Works ==
Findlay's atlases of Ancient and Comparative Geograph were known internationally. In 1851 he completed the revision of Richard Brookes's Gazetteer, and the same year published his first major work, on the Coasts and Islands of the Pacific Ocean, in 2 vols. of 1,400 pages.

Findlay issued six large nautical directories, which have proved invaluable to the maritime world. They included The North Atlantic Ocean, The South Atlantic Ocean, The Indian Ocean, Indian Archipelago, China, and Japan, The South Pacific Ocean, and The North Pacific Ocean. Sir Henry Rawlinson commented that these works had become standard authorities; he also executed a series of charts widely used by the mercantile marine. The Society of Arts awarded Findlay its medal for his dissertation on The English Lighthouse System. Subsequently, he published Lighthouses and Coast Fog Signals of the World.

He also wrote a paper on the connection of Lake Tanganyika with the Nile, accompanying it by a comparative series of maps relating to the northern end of the lake. Findlay served on various committees appointed by the British Association for the Advancement of Science, and contributed the following papers to section E: at Liverpool in 1853, On the Currents of the Atlantic and Pacific Oceans; Exeter, 1869, On the Gulf Stream, and its supposed influence upon the Climate of N.-W. Europe.

Findlay's publications came to 10,000 pages. He contributed several papers to the Journal of the Royal Geographical Society, the Transactions of the Royal United Service Institution, and the Transactions of the Society of Arts. At the time of Sir John Franklin's loss he sifted all the possible routes; and as a member of the Arctic committee of the Royal Geographical Society worked on the arguments which induced the government to send out the Alert and Discovery expedition of 1875. Findlay devoted much time to the labours of his friend David Livingstone, in central Africa, and he also investigated the sources of the Nile. For the record of the Burton and Speke explorations during 1858–59 he constructed a map of the routes traversed. In 1870 the Società Geografica Italiana elected him one of its foreign honorary members.
