= John Purdy (hydrographer) =

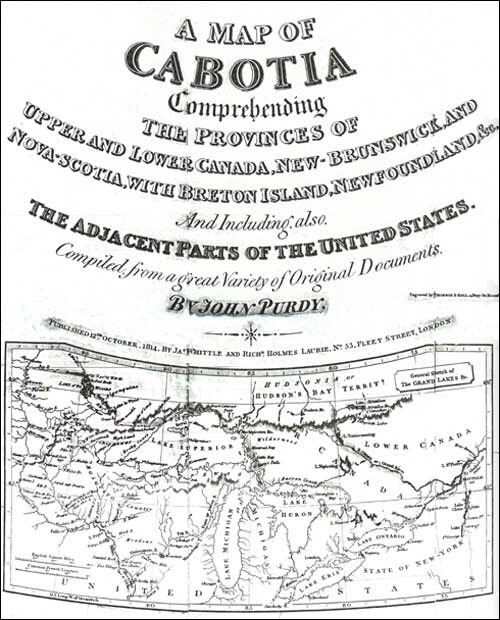
Map of Cabotia (1814) by John Purdy

John Purdy (1773–1843) was an important English hydrographer. His work and influence extended beyond hydrography with the coinage of the term pharology, the study of modern lighthouses and their designs. Purdy's work Memoir, descriptive and explanatory, to accompany the New Chart of the Atlantic Ocean was adapted and improved; continuing to be released in its fifteenth edition fifty years after his death.

== Life ==
The son of a bookseller at Norwich, Purdy took up the study of naval charts and similar subjects. Before 1812 he succeeded De la Rochette as hydrographer to Messrs. Laurie & Whittle, of 53 Fleet Street, London.

Purdy does not seem to have taken part in hydrographic expeditions himself, and his work consisted in writing works and constructing charts based upon the reports of others; but eventually he became a leading authority of his time on hydrography. He was mainly instrumental in bringing Rennell's Current before the notice of navigators, and in 1832 James Rennell's daughter, Lady Rodd, asked Purdy to edit his Wind and Current Charts.

Purdy died on 29 January 1843.

== Works ==
A map of Cabotia.

In 1812 Purdy published a Memoir, descriptive and explanatory, to accompany the New Chart of the Atlantic Ocean. This work went through many editions, the fifteenth appearing in 1894, edited by William Kettle, F.R.G.S.; Kettle was a nephew of Alexander George Findlay, who succeeded Purdy as a leading hydrographer, edited and improved many of Purdy's works, and took over the firm of Laurie & Whittle.

Among Purdy's other major publications were:

- Tables of Positions, or of the Latitudes and Longitudes of Places, 1816.
- The Columbian Navigator, 1817; other editions 1823–4, 2 vols., 1839, and 1847–8.
- Memoir to accompany the General Chart of the Northern Ocean, 1820.
- The New Sailing Directory for the Ethiopic or Southern Atlantic Ocean, 1837; 3rd edit. Findlay, 1844. Similar Sailing Directories, dealing with many other regions, were also published by Purdy.
- The British American Navigator, 2nd edit. 1843.

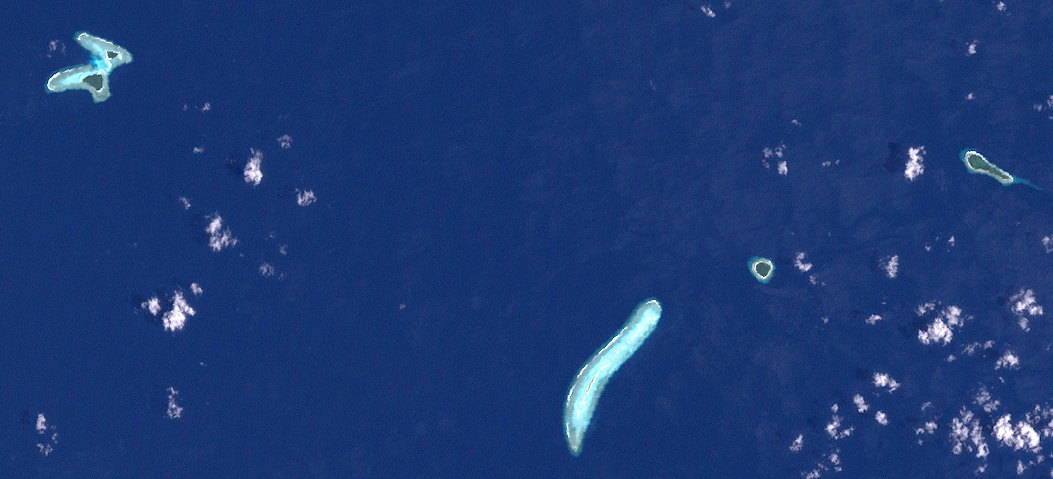
Landsat image of the Purdy Islands (Bismarck Archipelago), named after John Purdy in 1817

A list of Purdy's maps and charts was given in the Catalogue of the Map Room of the Royal Geographical Society. They include: a chart of the Atlantic Ocean (1812); a map of Cabotia, comprehending the Provinces of Upper and Lower Canada, (1814); a map of the world on Mercator's Projection (1825); The Azores (1831); Jamaica (1834); the Viceroyalty of Canada (1838); Newfoundland (1844). Others published by Findlay, after Purdy's death, include the Indian and Pacific Oceans (1847); St. George's Channel (1850); the coasts of Spain and Portugal (1856). His nephew Isaac published a chart of the coasts of China in 1865.

== Lighthouses ==
Purdy is credited as the coiner of the word "Pharology" as the study of modern lighthouses from the 1800s. The word appeared in Purdy's 1839 The Colombian Navigator; Or, Sailing Directory for the American Coasts and the West-Indies. The following year, 1840, it was used in Purdy's The New Sailing Directory for the Strait of Gibraltar and the Western Division of the Mediterranean Sea: Comprehending the Coasts of Spain, France, and Italy, from Cape Trafalgar to Cape Spartivento, the Balearic Isles, Corsica, Sardinia, Sicily and the Maltese Islands, with the African Coast, from Tangier to Tripoli, Inclusive ... Improved, by Considerable Additions, to the Present Times.

== Notes ==
Attribution

This article incorporates text from a publication now in the public domain: Lee, Sidney, ed. (1896). "Purdy, John". Dictionary of National Biography. Vol. 47. London: Smith, Elder & Co.
