= Kaniet language =

Language

Kaniet
- Native to: Papua New Guinea
- Region: Kaniet and western Anchorite island groups, Manus Province
- Extinct: 1950
- Language family: Austronesian: Malayo-Polynesian; Oceanic; Admiralty Islands; Western Admiralty Islands; Kaniet

Language codes
- ISO 639-3: ktk
- Glottolog: anch1239

The Kaniet languages were two of four Western Admiralty Islands languages, a subgroup of the Admiralty Islands languages, the other two being Wuvulu-Aua and Seimat. The languages were spoken on the Kaniet Islands (Anchorite Islands) in western Manus Province of Papua New Guinea until 1950.

Two languages were spoken on the islands, one reported by Thilenius and one by Dempwolff.
