= Treaty of The Hague (1895) =

1895 treaty between the United Kingdom and the Netherlands

The Treaty of Den Haag (also known as the Treaty of The Hague) was signed on 16 May 1895. The accord established the borders of British New Guinea.
