= Papua New Guinea–Solomon Islands Maritime Boundary Treaty =

Papua New Guinea – Solomon Islands Maritime Boundary Treaty
Treaty between the Independent State of Papua New Guinea and Solomon Islands Concerning Sovereignty, Maritime and Seabed Boundaries between the Two Countries, and Cooperation on Related Matters
- Type: Boundary delimitation
- Signed: 25 January 1989
- Parties: Papua New Guinea; Solomon Islands
- Depositary: United Nations Secretariat
- Languages: English

The Papua New Guinea – Solomon Islands Maritime Boundary Treaty is a 1989 treaty in which Papua New Guinea and the Solomon Islands agreed to delimit a maritime boundary between the two states.

The agreement was signed on 25 January 1989. The text of the treaty sets out a roughly north–south boundary that is approximately 1,000 nautical miles (1,200 mi; 1,900 km) long and is composed of a single straight-line maritime segment defined by two individual coordinate points. The boundary passes through the Bougainville Strait and the Solomon Sea. The boundary represents a modified equidistant line between Papua New Guinea and the Solomon Islands. The southern coordinate point is the tripoint with Australia.

The treaty was under negotiation for 11 years prior to signing. In the end, the boundary that was settled on is roughly the same as the 1904 Anglo-German line created by the United Kingdom and German Empire.

The full name of the treaty is Treaty between the Independent State of Papua New Guinea and Solomon Islands Concerning Sovereignty, Maritime and Seabed Boundaries between the Two Countries, and Cooperation on Related Matters. The treaty has not yet been ratified by the parties. In 1994, the two countries signed another treaty that set out principles in managing relations along the border, including provisions for unencumbered border crossing privileges for traditional inhabitants of the islands nearest to the maritime boundary.
