= Natural resource valuation =

Concept of natural resource economics

Natural resource valuation is a process of providing benefits, costs, damage of or to natural and environmental resources. It has a fundamental role in the practice of cost-benefit analysis of health, safety, and environmental issues.

Natural resource valuation is performed in the conduct of natural resource damage assessments (NRDA) done under the Comprehensive Environmental Response, Compensation, and Liability Act of 1980 (CERCLA, or Superfund), the Oil Pollution Act (OPA), and state regulations. It is also performed in cost-benefit analysis of environmental restoration (ER) and waste management. It is a key exercise in economic analysis and its results provide important information about values of environmental goods and services.

Natural resource valuation studies are often aimed at assessing economic values that represent the public good characteristics of natural systems. Willingness to pay measures are typically used to estimate ecosystem goods and services that benefit not only a select few but wider society. There are two types of valuation including market valuation and non market valuation. Market valuation estimates the total willingness to pay based on price (demand) whilst non market valuation estimates willingness to pay either through examining behavior of respondents or demand for related goods. Most of the environmental resources are valued using the constructive approach. There are number of methods involved in natural resource valuation including revealed preference and stated preference method.

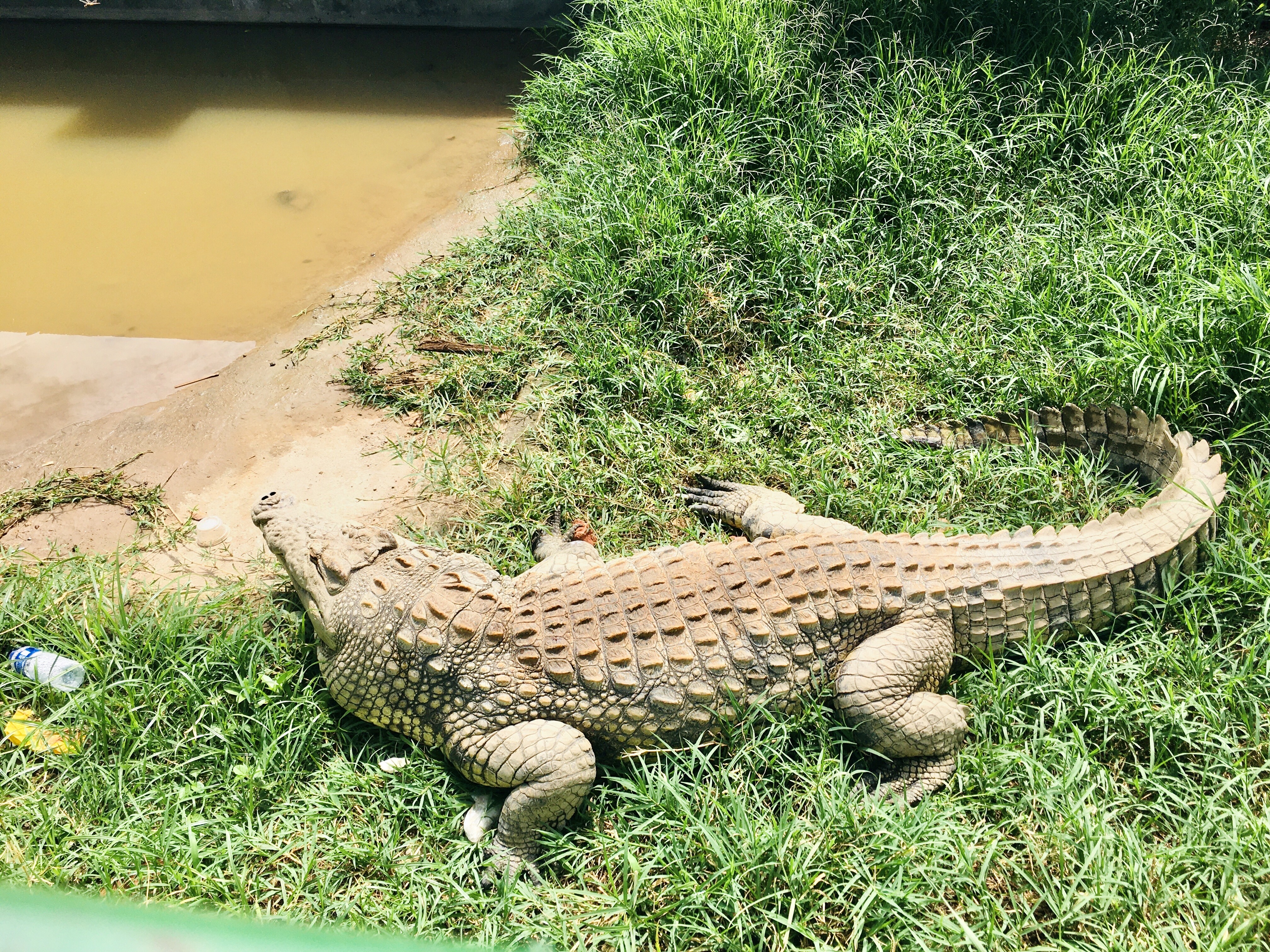

It is important to value natural resources because they contribute towards fiscal revenue, income, and poverty reduction. Sectors related to natural resources use provide jobs and are often the basis of livelihoods in poorer communities. Owing to this fundamental importance of natural resources, they must be managed sustainably.

== Importance ==
Resource valuation is used as an input to generate better policy recommendations to support protected areas management and its linkages to spatial planning process. Resource valuation studies should be conducted in the conflict areas (trade-off area) in order to get information on costs and benefits.

== History ==
Contingent valuation (CV) has been used by economists to value public goods for about twenty-five years. The approach posits a hypothetical market for an unpriced good and asks individuals to state the value they place on a proposed change in its quantity, quality, or access. Development of the CV concept has been described in reviews by Cummings, Brookshire, and Schulze (1986) and Mitchell and Carson (1989). The approach is now widely used to value many different goods whose quantity or quality might be affected by the decisions of a public agency or private developer. Three market-based techniques that have recorded a significant history of natural and environmental resource valuations are described; the market price approach, the appraisal method, and resource replacement costing. Contingent Valuation is also called Direct valuation of environmental damages and refers to the direct questioning of affected parties to assess the value of the natural resource.

== See also ==
- Ecosystem valuation
- Payment for Ecosystem Services
- Ecological goods and services
- Ecological economics
