= Kaniet Islands =

Island group in Papua New Guinea

Coordinates: 0°54′S 145°32′E

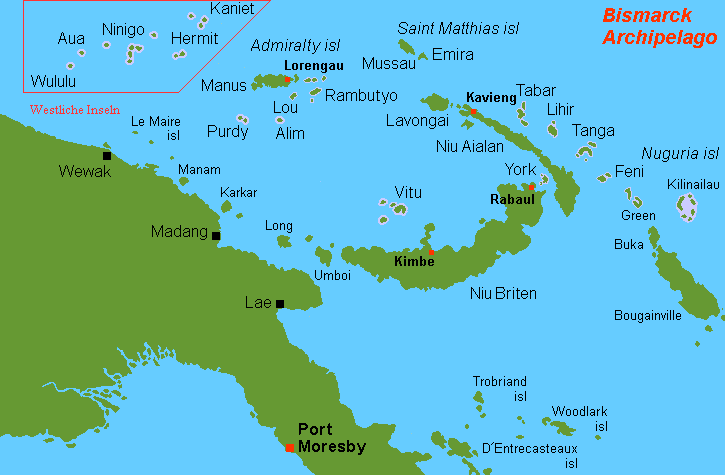
Location of Kaniet Islands at top left

The Kaniet Islands are the easternmost group islands within the Western Islands of the Bismarck Archipelago, Papua New Guinea. It consists four islands and one islet. Their coordinates are, located north-east of the Hermit Islands. Sae Island is a nearby island often subsumed under the Kaniet(-Sae) Islands, albeit the two are distinct. Another name for the Kaniet(-Sae) Islands is "Anchorite Islands".

The first sighting by Europeans of Kaniet islands was by the Spanish navigator Iñigo Órtiz de Retes on 19 August 1545 when on board of the carrack San Juan tried to return from Tidore to New Spain. He charted them as Hombres Blancos (White Men in Spanish) because of the color of the skin of its inhabitants that contrasted with that of the population of New Guinea. In 1780 and 1800 they received visits of new Spanish expeditions commanded respectively by Francisco Mourelle de la Rúa and Juan Antonio de Ibargoitia.

== See also ==
- Kaniet language
