= Hermit Islands =

Archipelago in Papua New Guinea

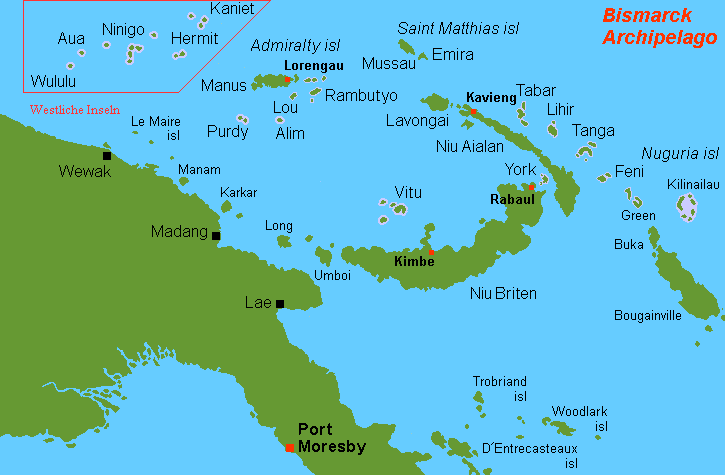
Location of Hermit Islands at top left

The Hermit Islands are a group of 17 islands within the Western Islands of the Bismarck Archipelago, Papua New Guinea. Their coordinates are 1°30′S 145°4′E.

== History ==
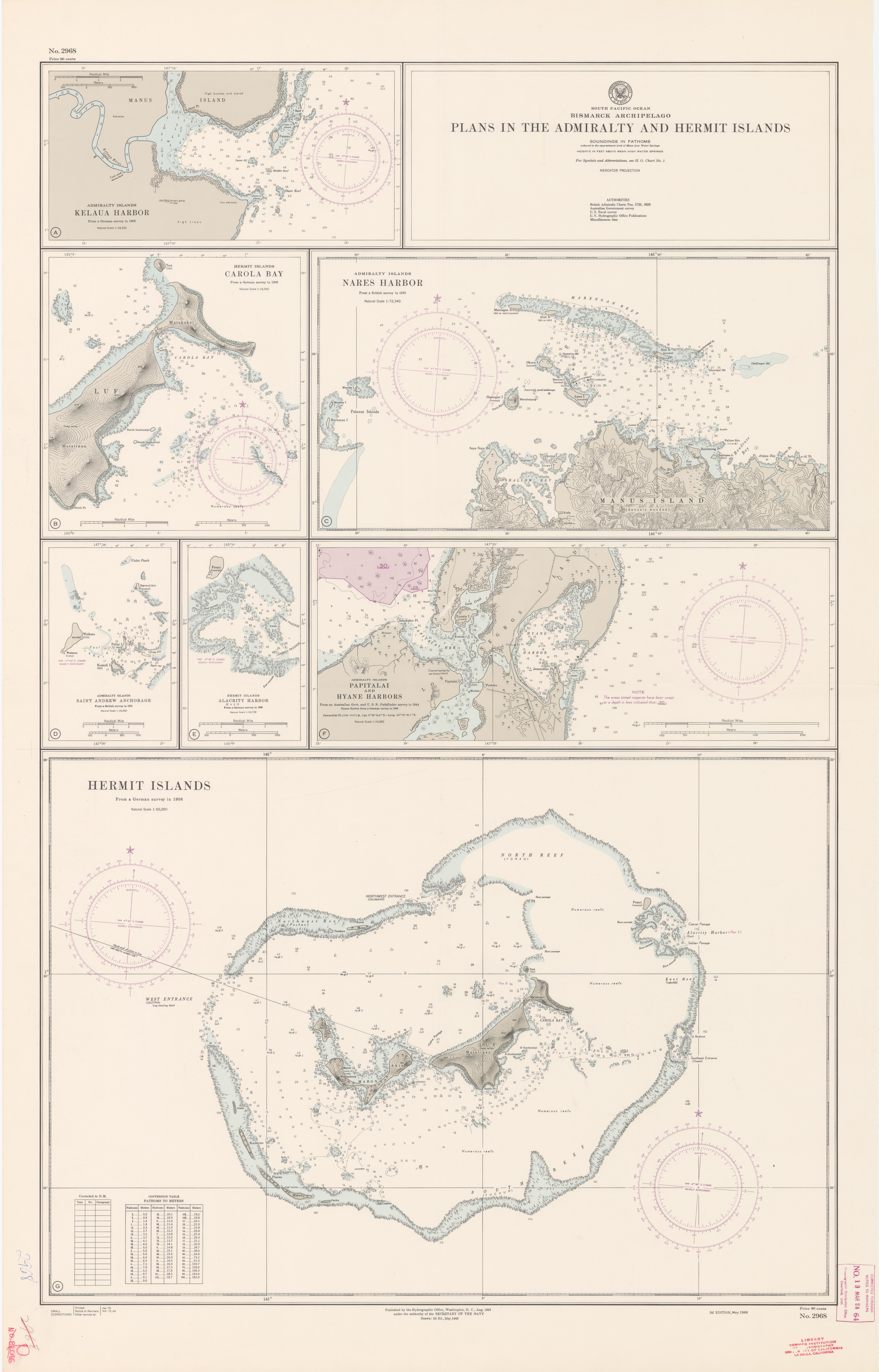
Nautical chart, Hermit Islands on bottom part

The first sighting of Wuvulu Island by a European was by the Spanish navigator Iñigo Órtiz de Retes on 27 July 1545, while on board the carrack San Juan and returning from Tidore to New Spain. He charted them as La Caimana (meaning "a female caiman" in Spanish). Órtiz de Retes reported that as they were passing by, some natives got near the ship who flung arrows by hand with tips made of flint suitable for striking fire.

=== World War II ===
On 17 June 1944, after returning from a bombing mission, 11 aircrew were bailed out from the B-24 Liberator Dropsnoot over the Hermit Islands and landed in rough seas approximately two miles from the southeast of Jalun Island. Four drowned, while the other seven were cared for by natives until being rescued.
