= Ninigo Islands =

Island group in Papua New Guinea

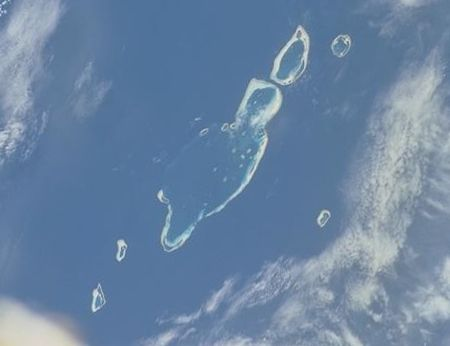
Satellite image of Ninigo Islands

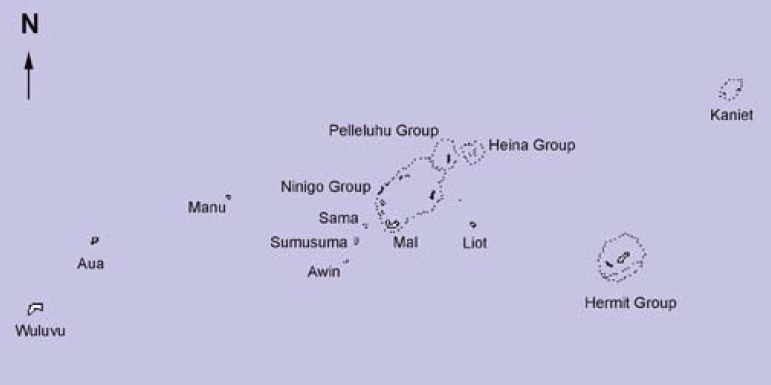
Map of the Western Islands

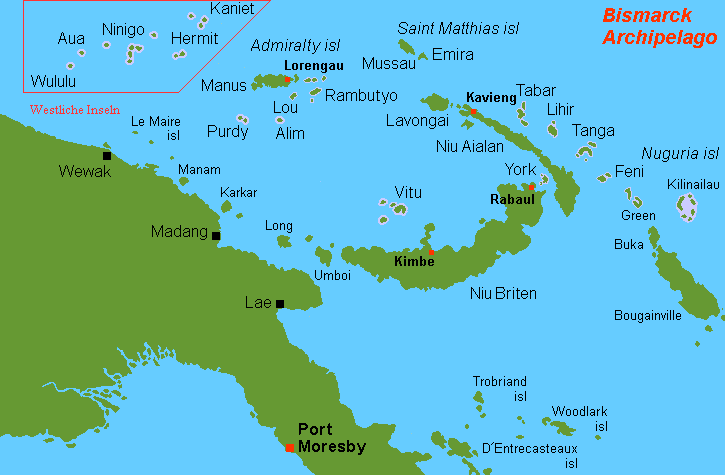
Location of Ninigo Islands at top left

The Ninigo Islands are a group of 31 islands within the Western Islands of the Bismarck Archipelago, Papua New Guinea. Their coordinates are 1°16′S 144°15′E.

== History ==
The first sighting of Wuvulu Island by a European was by the Spanish navigator Iñigo Órtiz de Retes on 27 July 1545, while on board the carrack San Juan and returning from Tidore to New Spain. He charted this island together with the nearby islands, Aua and Manu, as La Barbada (meaning "the bearded island" in Spanish).
