= Yñigo Ortiz de Retez =

16th-century Spanish explorer and nobleman

Yñigo, Íñigo, or Iñigo Ortiz de Retes (fl. 1545) was a 16th-century Spanish maritime explorer of Basque origin, who navigated the northern coastline of the Pacific–Melanesian island of New Guinea and is credited with bestowing its current name (Latin: Nova Guinea; Spanish: Nueva Guinea).

== Life ==
=== Early life ===
Yñigo Ortiz de Retes was born in Retes de Llanteno (Alava, Spain) in a non-titled nobility family (hidalgos) in the first decade of the 16th century. The first accounts we have of him are as part of Alvarado's expedition of 1538 to take the governorship of Guatemala and Honduras. He participated in the expedition to relieve the siege of Nochistlán in 1541 during the Mixtón war, led by Alvarado.

=== Villalobos Expedition ===
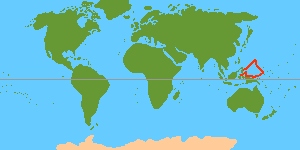
Retez's expedition

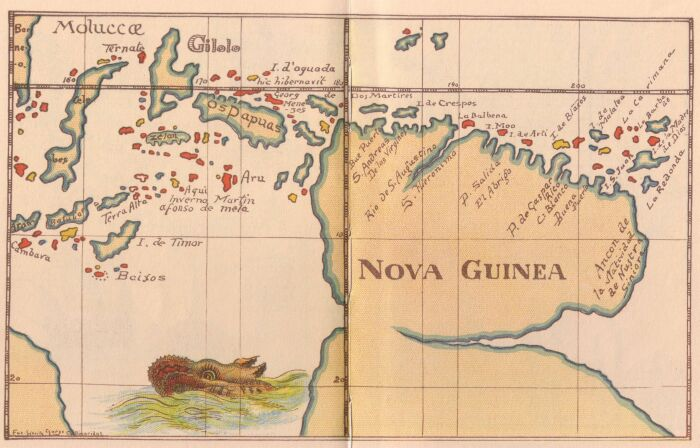
Map of New Guinea (1600)

In 1542, he was appointed to the expedition of López de Villalobos to the Islas de Poniente (Philippines). Upon his arrival in Mindanao in February 1543, Ortiz de Retes was promoted to Maestre de Campo.

After the unsuccessful attempt of Bernardo de la Torre in 1543 to return to Mexico along a northern route, López de Villalobos commissioned Ortiz de Retes for the same mission but going south. On 16 May 1545, Ortiz de Retes, in command of the San Juan de Letrán, left port in Tidore, an island which was Spain's stronghold in the Maluku Islands and going by way of the Talaud Islands and the Schoutens, reached the northern coast of New Guinea, which was coasted till the end of August when, having got to the 5° S. latitude, contrary winds and currents forced a return to Tidore where he arrived on 5 October 1545. Many islands were encountered and first charted, along the northern coast of New Guinea, and in the Padaidos, Le Maires, Ninigos, Kaniets and Hermits, to some of which Spanish names were given.

On 20 June 1545, at the mouth of the Mamberamo River (that was charted as San Agustin), he took possession of the land for the Spanish Crown, in the process giving the island the name by which it is known today. He called it Nueva Guinea or Nova Guinea owing to the supposed resemblance of the local inhabitants to the peoples of the Guinea coast in West Africa.

Spanish activity in New Guinea.

The main source for Retes's voyage is that of Garcia de Escalante Alvarado, who was part of the Villalobos expedition, and who, after his return to Spain, wrote a chronicle that he sent to Antonio de Mendoza, viceroy of New Spain.

Ortiz de Retes was later imprisoned by the Portuguese in the Moluccas along with the remaining members of Villalobos's expedition. According to Escalante, he was one of the 117 who were later repatriated by the Portuguese in 1548.
