= Aua Island =

Island in Papua New Guinea

Coordinates: 1°27′45″S 143°03′35″E

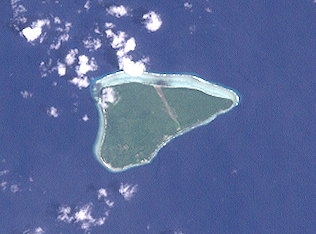
Aua Island

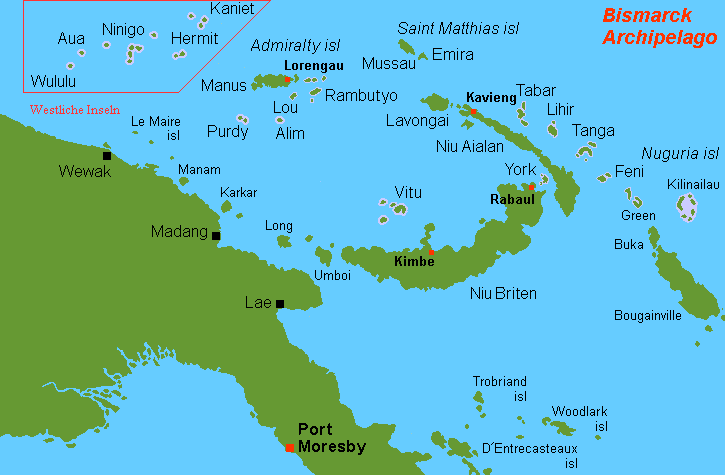
Location of Aua at top left

Aua is an island in the Bismarck Archipelago. It is part of the Western Islands within Manus Province of northern Papua New Guinea. It forms part of the Aua-Wuvulu Rural LLG.

== History ==
The first sighting of Wuvulu Island by a European was by the Spanish navigator Iñigo Órtiz de Retes on 27 July 1545, while on board the carrack San Juan and returning from Tidore to New Spain. He charted this island together with the nearby islands, Aua and Manu, as La Barbada (meaning "the bearded island" in Spanish). The first written reference to Aua occurs as a brief reference to their discovery by de Retes in the chronicle of A. de Herrera, published in Madrid in 1615. On 19 September 1767, Philip Carteret, the British navigator sailing in HMS Swallow, sighted Aua, and named her Durour, after one of his ship's officers. A trading station was established on Aua in 1903, by two young Germans with twelve New Guineans from New Ireland and Buka Island. While one of the Germans was off the island with malaria, the inhabitants killed the other. The group responsible for his death then left the island to escape retribution, but many were killed in a storm.

== Geography ==
Aua is a flat low-lying island, about two miles across from east to west, with a total area of 3,380 acres. Its palm- fringed shore is surrounded by coral reefs, which rise out of deep water. Its circumference is 10.256 km.

== Inhabitants ==
The genetic makeup of the island is especially diverse when contrasted against the surrounding islands in the Bismark Archipelago, the inhabitants descend from various stocks of Papuan, Melanesian, Polynesian, and Micronesian peoples. In 1950 the Sydney Morning Herald described the island as being the "strangest community in the world", noting that the people practiced both polygamy and polyandry, and the women are not allowed to do any work. There is one primary school with 40 students and just one teacher.

== Transport ==
Aua has a grass airstrip with the IATA code of AUI.

== See also ==
- Bismarck Archipelago topics
- Islands Region
