= Baluan Island =

Island in Papua New Guinea

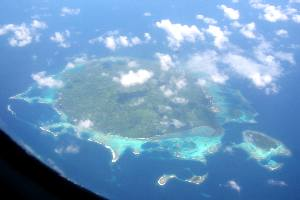
- Balaun Island from the air

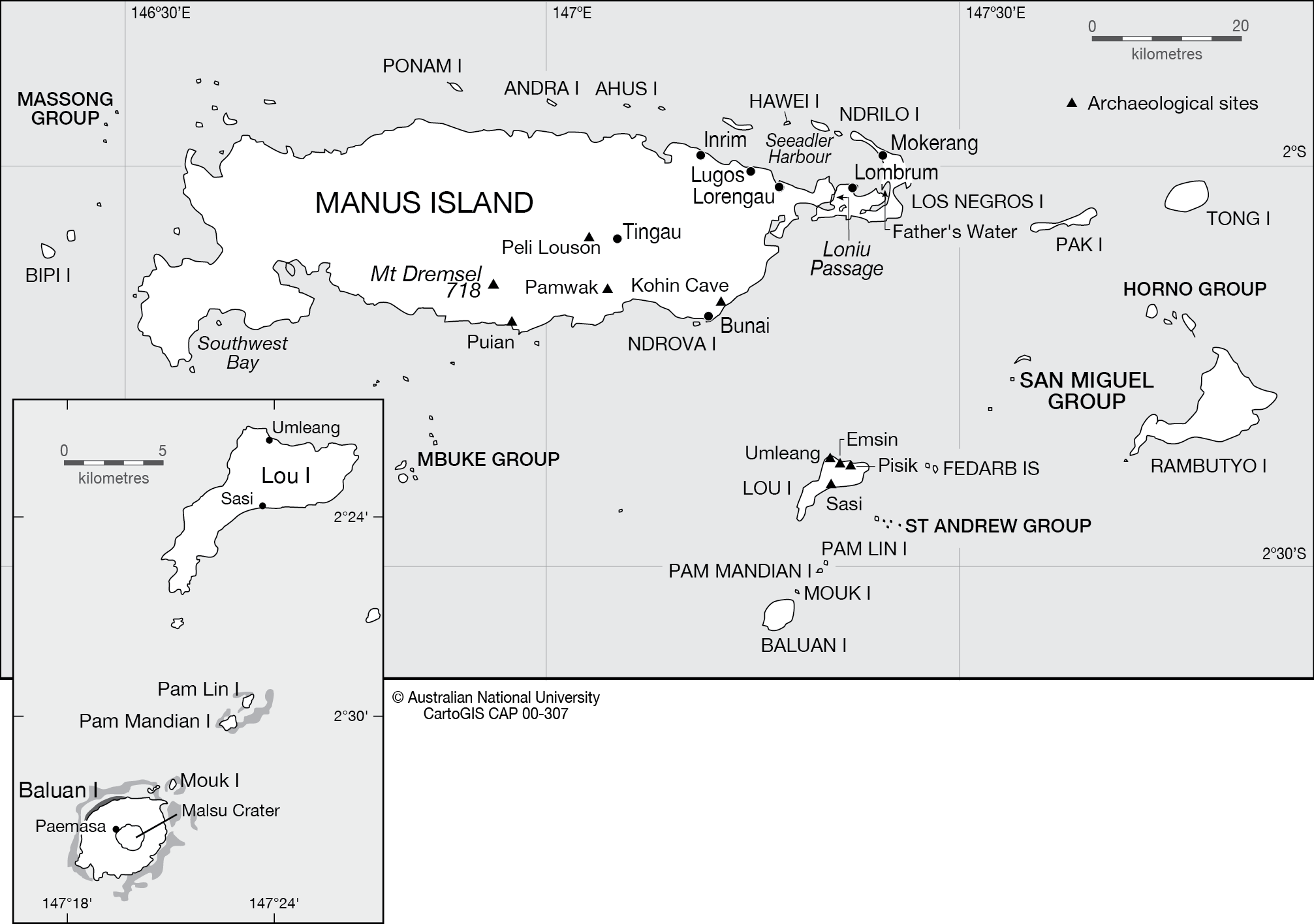
- Location of Balaun Island within the Admiralty Islands

Geography
- Coordinates: 2.558265°S 147.283895°E
- Archipelago: Admiralty Islands, Bismarck Archipelago
- Area: 14 km^{2} (5.4 sq mi)
- Width: 5 km (3.1 mi)
- Coastline: 16 km (9.9 mi)
- Highest point: Saboma Crater

Administration
- Papua New Guinea
- Province: Manus Province
- District: Manus District
- Local-Level Government: Balopa Rural LLG

Demographics
- Population: 1,910 (2011 Census)

Additional information
- Time zone: AEST

Baluan Island (formerly known as Saint Patrick Island) is the southernmost island of the Admiralty Islands group which makes up the majority of Manus Province in Papua New Guinea. It belongs to the Pam Islands, an island subgroup to the south of Lou Island. It is formed from an extinct volcano, also named Baluan.

== Geography ==
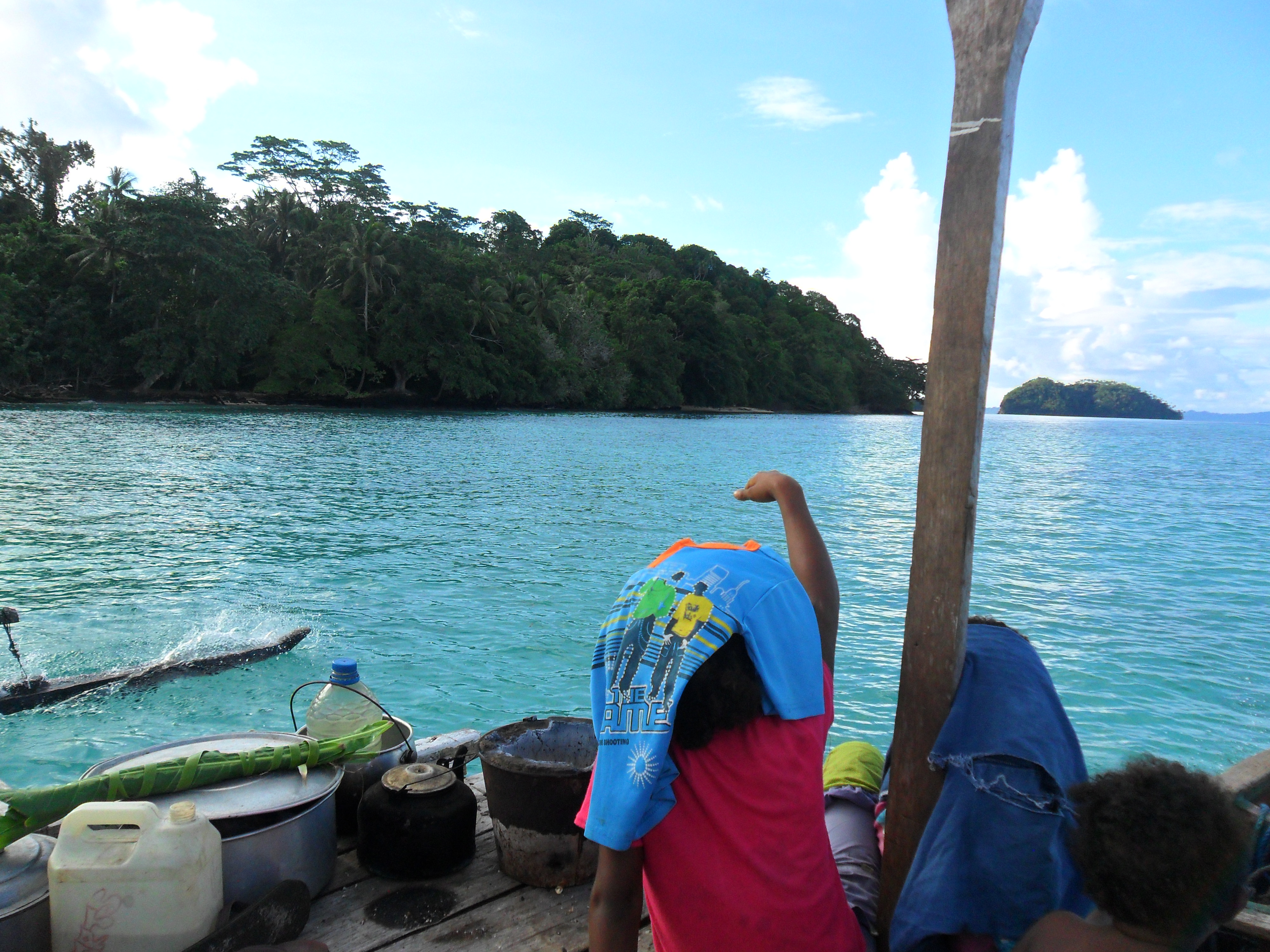
Looking towards the coast of Baluan

Baluan is formed by a Pleistocene stratovolcano with a large summit crater and several flank vents, some of which might be from the Holocene age. Baluan has erupted basaltic rock rather than rhyolitic rocks like its neighbours. Several small islands consisting of cone remnants are located within 1 kilometre (0.62 mi) of the north coast. Geothermal activity is observed in coastal areas. Volcanic activity is evident from the hot water springs which emerge close to the shore which are mostly covered by the tide. There is a reef which surrounds the island and prevents the sea from damaging the coast.

The Saboma Crater is the highest point on the island, at 254 metres (833 ft) above sea level. It forms the crater rim of the inactive volcano in the middle of the island. It has a maximum width of about 2 kilometres (1.2 mi). The sides of the crater are densely forested. On the east and south sides of the island there are a number of beaches.

Batapona Mountain, which has an elevation of 150 metres (490 ft), is located at the north edge of the island, and is formed of an arcuate rim and pyroclastic cone.

There is an unconfirmed report of an eruption near the island in 1931 from a submarine vent. Contrastingly, the nearby St. Andrew Strait volcano, off the shore of neighbouring Lou Island, is confirmed to have erupted from 1953 to 1957, which created nearby Tuluman Island.

== Lifestyle ==
=== Demographics ===
There are several settlements on Baluan, including Mouk, Lipan, Sone, and Parioi, which according to the 2011 National Census have a combined population of 1,910. The island is situated within the Local-Level Government region of Balopa (Baluan, Lou, Pam Islands). A significant portion of Baluan's population live away from the island to work in urban areas.

The languages of Titan and Baluan-Pam, known as locally as Paluai, are spoken on the island, in addition to Tok Pisin.

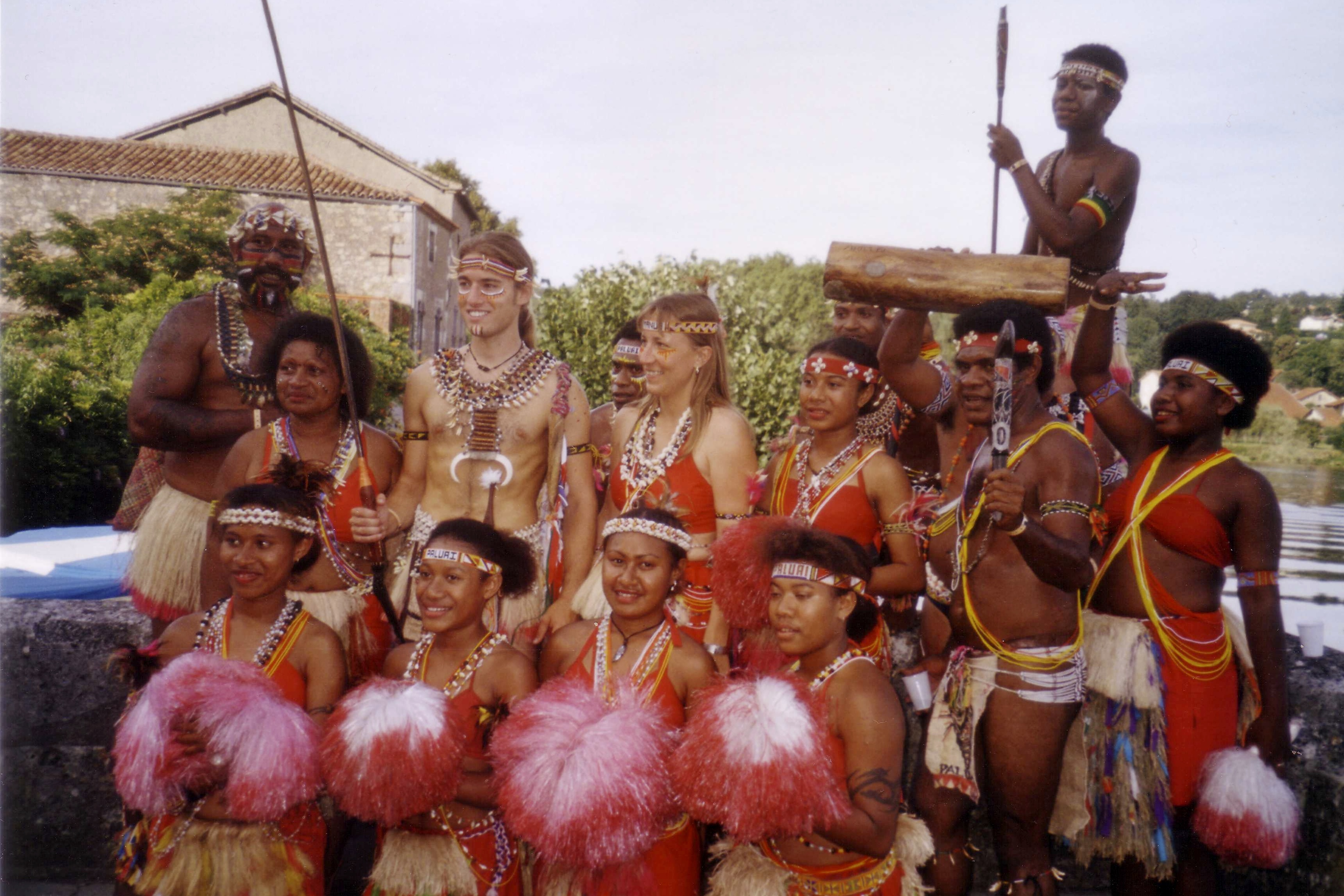
Festival de Confolens Performers from Baluan participating in the French Confolens Festival in 2004

==== Culture ====
In the early 20th century, the entire population was converted to Christianity, the two main denominations being Catholicism and the Seventh-day Adventists. Tok Pisin is normally used for Church services. Christianity does however operate parallel to other traditional belief systems, which mainly relate to illness and cure. Many Balauan people are members of the Baluan Native Christian United Church, founded in 1946 by Paliau Maloat. The creation of this denomination was in response to oppression under colonial administration from Australia.

The Balopa Cultural Festival takes place on Baluan, which is the largest cultural event on the island and involves the neighbouring islands Lou and the Pam Islands as well.

According to a report in Air Niugini Paradise magazine, some communities interpret lights seen around New Year as omens for the coming year.

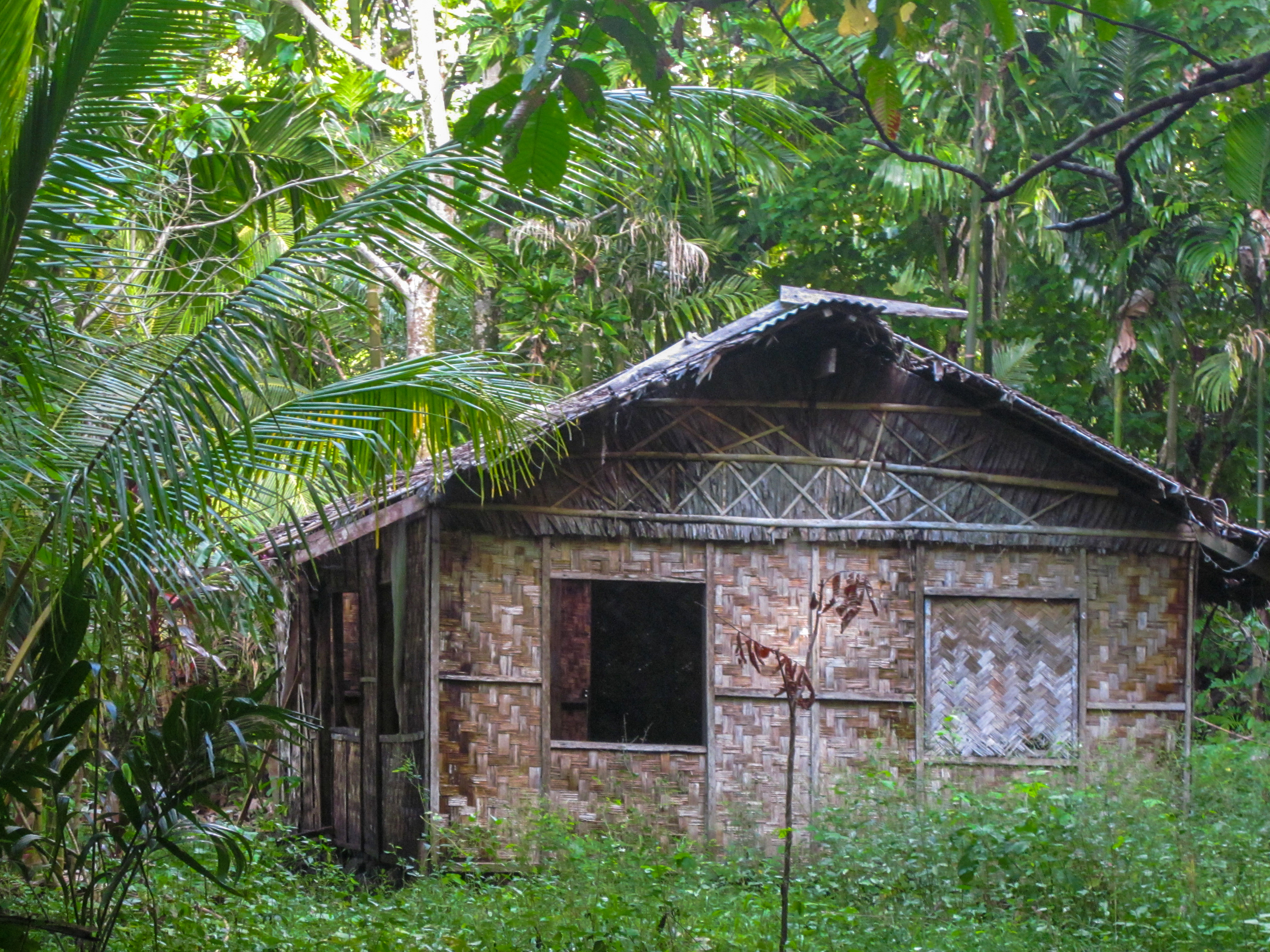
A bush house on Baluan

==== Settlements ====
One of the main settlements on the island is Mouk, situated on the northern end of the island, which had a population of 341 in the 2011 National Census. The people of Mouk are fishers and seafarers traditionally who speak Titan, and were invited to the island in the late 1940s, moving from the small nearby island of the same name. Prior to that, they had originated from Pere on the southern coast of Manus Island. It is speculated that they were invited to the island in order to protect against other groups which speak Titan, located on the southern coast of Manus Island and in the M'Buke Islands, as they were known for their raids on distant islands.

In pre-colonial times, villages acted as political units, consisting of multiple groups with common ancestors. Houses of high status and their leader, were called lapan. Disputes between groups could either be resolved through warfare, or through the preparation of a large feast, which would take several years to prepare.

Most settlements are on the coast. Houses are built elevated from the ground, sometimes with a veranda. A separate building is generally used for cooking. Garden plots are generally not placed next to houses. Family lineages each possess their own land for creating gardens, however this information can be difficult to find.

Black basalt rocks found in the island's soil have been used to build stone walls throughout the island, which surround gardens and former house sites.

=== Economy ===
As a third of Baluan's population does not live on the island, remittances are an important source of income for those living on the island. This practice has raised the living standards in Baluan significantly over time. Most people on the island live a subsistence-based lifestyle, however there are markets on the island for purchasing store goods. A wider selection of store goods can be found at stores in Lorengau. While there are cocoa and coconut plantations on the island, they do not always export, as the cost of petrol to transport produce to the mainland creates additional expense.

==== Education ====
Primary education was established on the island in 1951. There are three elementary schools and one primary school located in Lipan. From grade three onwards, all teaching takes place in English. For continuing to secondary school, students have to leave Baluan for Lorengau or go elsewhere. Education is highly valued in Baluan society, because of the Western knowledge it provides, and the employment opportunities outside of Baluan which come with it.

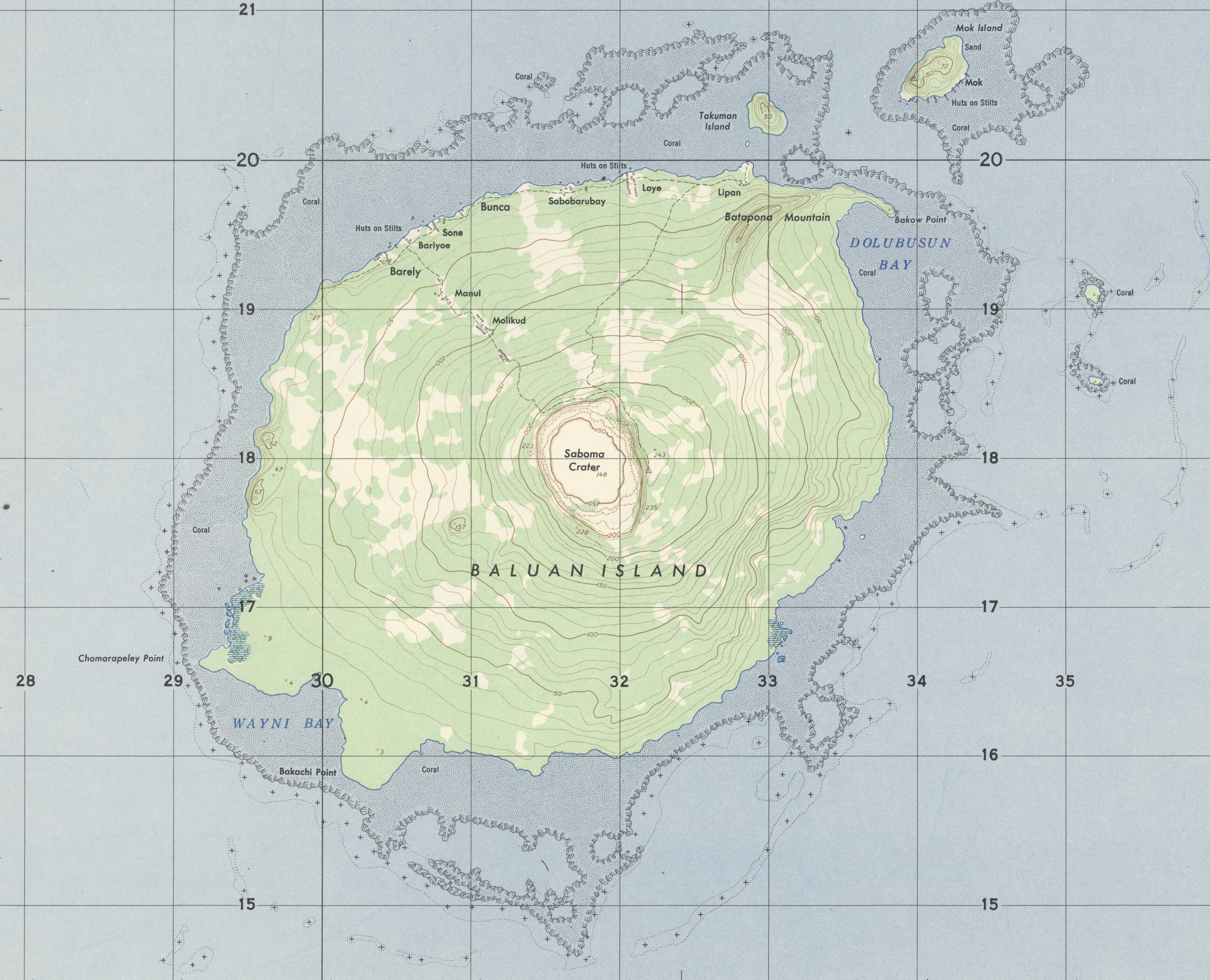
1957 topographical map of Baluan

=== Agriculture ===
The main foods on the island are fish and vegetables grown on the volcanic soil. Strewn with black basalt rocks, the soil is more fertile than what is found on most of the islands in the archipelago. Baluan is surrounded by coral reefs, which provides fish, crustaceans, and sea turtles which can be hunted for their meat. The environmental conditions on Baluan in pre-colonial times did and continue to allow for a subsistence-based lifestyle. In large gardens, people grow taro, yams, pawpaw, banana, sweet potato, pineapple, sugarcane, and corn. Breadfruit, mango and coconuts can be obtained from trees which grow throughout island. The eggs of a bird known as the white fowl are also dug out for consumption. The island has no fresh water, therefore drinking water must be obtained by catching rain water.

== Notable residents ==
A prominent figure from Baluan was Sir Paliau Maloat OBE (1907 – 1991), who was elected as the First National Member of Assembly for Manus Province in 1964. He is known for creating the Paliau Movement, which advocated for the people of the Admiralty Islands to adopt Western and Christian values, expand economic development, and ensure the emancipation of women in the society, in order to modernise Manusian society. He died in 1991 and is buried on Baluan.

Winnie Kiap CBE was born on Baluan and is the High Commissioner of Papua New Guinea to the United Kingdom, and previously served as Secretary to the National Executive Council of Papua New Guinea.

== See also ==
- Pam Islands
- Baluan-Pam Language
