= Winnie Kiap =

Papua New Guinean diplomat

Her Excellency Winnie Kiap CBE
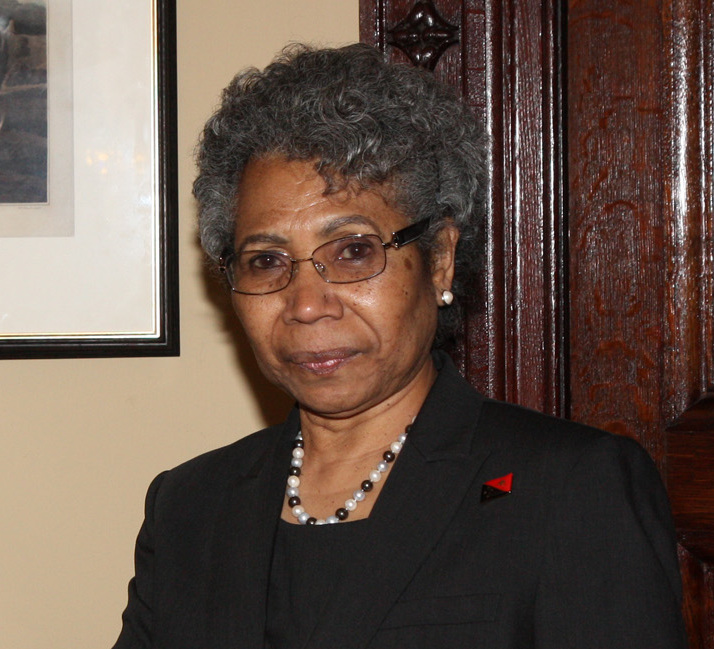
- Kiap in 2013

Papua New Guinean High Commissioner to the United Kingdom
- In office August 2011 – August 2022
- Prime Minister: Michael Somare; Peter O'Neill; James Marape
- Preceded by: Jean Kekedo

Papua New Guinean High Commissioner to the Republic of Cyprus
- In office 2012 – August 2022
- Prime Minister: Michael Somare; Peter O'Neill; James Marape

Papua New Guinean Ambassador to the Arab Republic of Egypt
- In office August 2011 – August 2022
- Prime Minister: Michael Somare; Peter O'Neill; James Marape

Papua New Guinean Ambassador to the State of Israel
- In office August 2011 – August 2022
- Prime Minister: Michael Somare; Peter O'Neill; James Marape

Papua New Guinean High Commissioner to the Republic of South Africa
- In office 2012 – August 2022
- Prime Minister: Michael Somare; Peter O'Neill; James Marape

Papua New Guinean Ambassador to the Republic of Zimbabwe
- In office August 2011 – August 2022
- Prime Minister: Michael Somare; Peter O'Neill; James Marape

Personal details
- Born: 1948 (age 77–78) Baluan Island, Manus Territory of Papua and New Guinea (now Papua New Guinea)
- Education: University of Queensland

Winnie Anna Kiap CBE (born 1948) is a Papua New Guinean former diplomat who served as the Papua New Guinea High Commissioner to the United Kingdom with accreditation to Cyprus, Egypt, Israel, South Africa, and Zimbabwe from 2011 to 2022. In 2022, she was a nominated as a candidate for Governor-General of Papua New Guinea.

In 2018, she was the recipient of the Diplomat of the Year Award for outstanding contribution to the Commonwealth.

== Early life ==
Kiap is from Baluan Island in Manus Province. She attended Mount St Marys College, Katoomba and St Vincent's College, Potts Point. She graduated from the University of Queensland in Australia.

== Civil service ==
She first worked for the Tongan civil service as Senior Executive Officer in the Prime Minister’s Department. She then became Assistant Secretary in the Tongan Department of Agriculture, Forests and Fisheries. She was also Assistant Secretary for Commerce in the Tongan Department of Labour, Commerce and Industry. From 1988, she worked for the Papua New Guinea Consulate-General in Sydney.

In 1992, she returned to PNG working in the Papua New Guinea Department of Trade and Industry, later moving in 1994 to the position of Director of Corporate Services in the Investment Promotion Authority.

In 1998, she became Secretary to the National Executive Council, a position she held for ten years as the first woman to serve in the role. She was also appointed as temporary head of the Prime Minister's Department for six months in 2008. She served as director on two corporate boards in the PNG financial sector, and worked as a freelance consultant for the two years prior to her diplomatic appointment.

In 2011, Kiap was the only woman nominated as a candidate for the role of Governor-General of Papua New Guinea. (Note: Enny Moaitz also intended to nominate, however she did not receive the necessary nominations in time.)

== High Commissioner ==
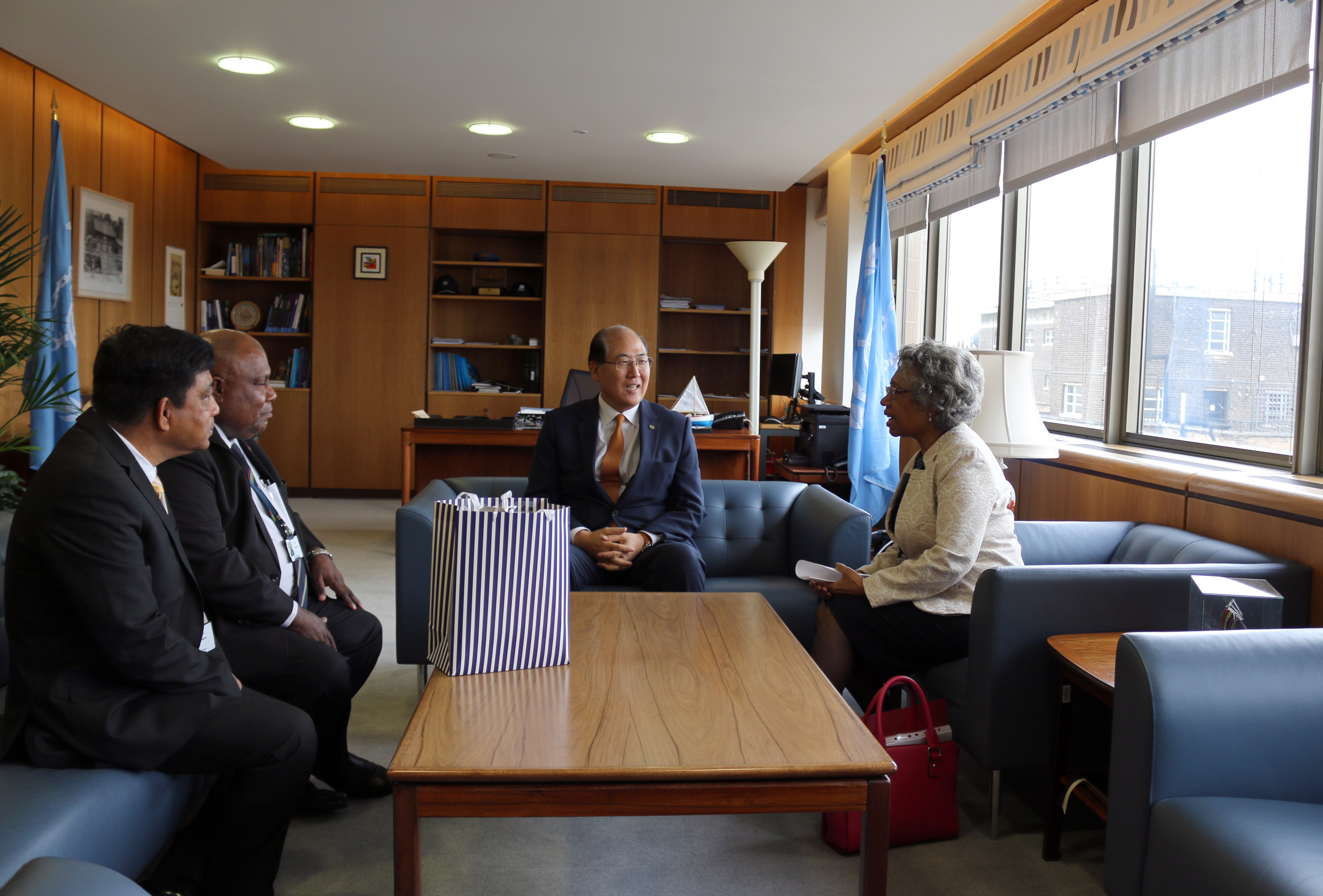
Kiap with International Maritime Organisation Secretary-General Kitack Lim

In August 2011, Kiap was appointed High Commissioner of Papua New Guinea to the United Kingdom with accreditation to Cyprus, Egypt, Israel, South Africa and Zimbabwe. During her term she also represented Papua New Guinea at the Commonwealth Secretariat, Commonwealth Foundation, International Coffee Organization, International Maritime Organisation and the International Cocoa Organisation. She is on the Board of the Eminent Persons Group of the Pacific Leadership Foundation. Kiap is a member of Coalition for Change PNG, an advocacy group committed to legislative change and advocacy targeting family violence.

In 2015, Kiap was appointed a Commander of the Order of British Empire for public service.

She served as chair of the Commonwealth Secretariat Board of Governors from 2016 to 2018, when she was succeeded by Cypriot High Commissioner Euripides Evriviades.

Kiap’s term as High Commissioner ended in August 2022.

In December 2022, she was nominated as one of three candidates for Governor-General of Papua New Guinea in 2023, alongside incumbent Sir Bob Dadae and Stephen Pokawin. Kiap lost the election to Dadae.
