= Big Potato (Xylofagou) =

Statue of a potato in Cyprus

Coordinates: 34.97608361173903°N 33.835393526689685°E

The Big Potato in October 2021

The Big Potato is a statue in Xylofagou, Cyprus. Designed by George Tasou and erected in October 2021, it stands 4.9 m (16 ft) tall and is made of fibreglass.

== Overview ==
The statue cost €8,000 to create and is located at the centre of Xylofagou, commemorating the potato-growing history of Xylofagou and the villages around it. It was created ahead of the annual local potato festival. It is shaped after the Spunta potato breed, which is grown in the village and is famous for its abnormally long shape. It is guarded at night to prevent vandalism. Tasou stated that he was inspired by The Big Fish in Belfast, and wanted to commemorate Xylofagou's potato history in a similar way. The Deputy Ministry of Tourism in Cyprus welcomed the project. The statue was pushed over by vandals on 1 January 2022 at around 3:30 am, causing €4,000 in damages. It was confirmed to not be weather-related, though the perpetrators were never caught despite a €500 reward for information.

Every December, the statue is decorated to resemble a traditional Christmas tree; a star is placed at the top, lights are draped to the floor, and tinsel surrounds its base. It was announced in July 2023 that the Xylofagou Big Potato International Festival would be happening around September 7 and 8. The organisers promised that the festival would feature local farmers and agriculture experts who will educate those interested in their trade. Other future plans for the statue include road signs pointing tourists towards the statue, seats next to it to be used for photographs, a potato museum, and a Guinness World Record attempt for frying the most chips at one time. The Guinness World Record attempt took place on September 7 2023, falling 200 kilograms short of the record.

In March 2026, the statute broke off its stand following a weekend of extreme weather conditions and strong winds. The statute was reinstated at a cost of €2000, and no injuries were reported.

== Reception ==
The statue has received mixed reviews, with much of its popularity being sarcastic due its phallic shape. While some locals in Xylofagou like the statue, some have been upset with its creation, due to the nature of its appearance provoking negative reaction across social media; they have expressed a belief that it has brought the village into disrepute globally. Tasou defended his decision to create the statue in the Cyprus Mail and stated, "Xylofagou has a long legacy of potato growing and used to be the main potato grower in Cyprus. This helped the village grow into the 10,000-strong community it is today." He later stated that anyone seeing anything else other than a potato was "guilty of a dirty mind" and said he was unbothered by any criticism due to the statue bringing publicity to the village. Euripides L. Evriviades, the former Cypriot ambassador to the UK, mocked the statue on Twitter with a post that said, "Other countries have instantly recognizable monuments. Now we have ours." He also sarcastically compared it to other landmarks such as the Eiffel Tower and the Statue of Liberty.
