= BLQ =

BLQ or blq may refer to:

- BLQ, the IATA code for Bologna Guglielmo Marconi Airport, Italy
- blq, the ISO 639-3 code for Baluan-Pam language, Papua New Guinea
