= St. Andrew Strait =

Volcano in Papua New Guinea

- Location within Papua New Guinea

Highest point
- Elevation: 270 m (890 ft)
- Coordinates: 02°23′0″S 147°21′0″E

Geography
- Location: Papua New Guinea, Admiralty Islands

Geology
- Mountain type: Complex volcano
- Last eruption: 1953 to 1957

St. Andrew Strait is a compound volcano in Papua New Guinea that has had eruptions in historical times. The volcano is not linked to any tectonic plates, the volcano is also in an area of very few earthquakes, suggesting that St. Andrew Strait is an Intraplate volcano. It consists of a group of Quaternary volcanic cones that are mainly rhyolitic in composition. The volcanism is curved, suggesting that the volcano has an ancient caldera. The centre of the volcano is Lou Island. Lou island last erupted in 240 BC (give or take 100 years) and 340 AD, both eruptions came from the Bendal volcano. Lou island is the largest eruptive centre of the volcano, with 6 volcanic vents. The Pam Islands (Pam Lin and Pam Mandian) also contain fresh deposits. Historic eruptions have come from the Tuluman Islands.

== Eruptions ==
=== 1880 eruption ===
A small submarine eruption came from the Tulaman islands on March 28, 1880. The vent that the eruption came from was probably one of the vents that formed Tuluman island in its 1953–1957 eruption. This was a small VEI 2 explosive eruption.

=== 1953–1957 eruption ===
An eruption began on 27 June 1953. The eruption began with submarine eruptions that formed a new island. The eruption came from 6 vents:

- Vent 1. Located 1.3 km SSE of Lou Island. Emerged above the surface for two months, but was reduced to a submarine mound by wave action.
- Vents 2,4,5. These three vents combined to form an island, 2 km south of Lou Island. The island reached a maximum length of 1 km.
- Vent 3. Located 1.3 km south of Lou Island. The irregular shaped island reached a maximum length of 400 m.
- Vent 6. Vent 6 is submerged and located 300 m south of vent 5.

The eruptions were most intense in 1955 (and also near the end of the eruption) when lava effusion was dominant. The island was built 29 m above sea level. The eruption also produced tsunamis. The eruption was one of only 3 major rhyolitic eruptions of the 20th Century.

=== References ===
- "St. Andrew Strait". Global Volcanism Program. Smithsonian Institution.
- Volcano Live: Tuluman Volcano
