= ICCO =

ICCO is an acronym that may refer to:

- Interchurch Organisation for Development Cooperation, a Netherlands-based NGO
- International Cocoa Organization
- Dr. William M. Scholl College of Podiatric Medicine, formerly the Illinois College of Chiropody and Orthopedics
