= Xylofagou =

Xylofagou Ξυλοφάγου (Greek)
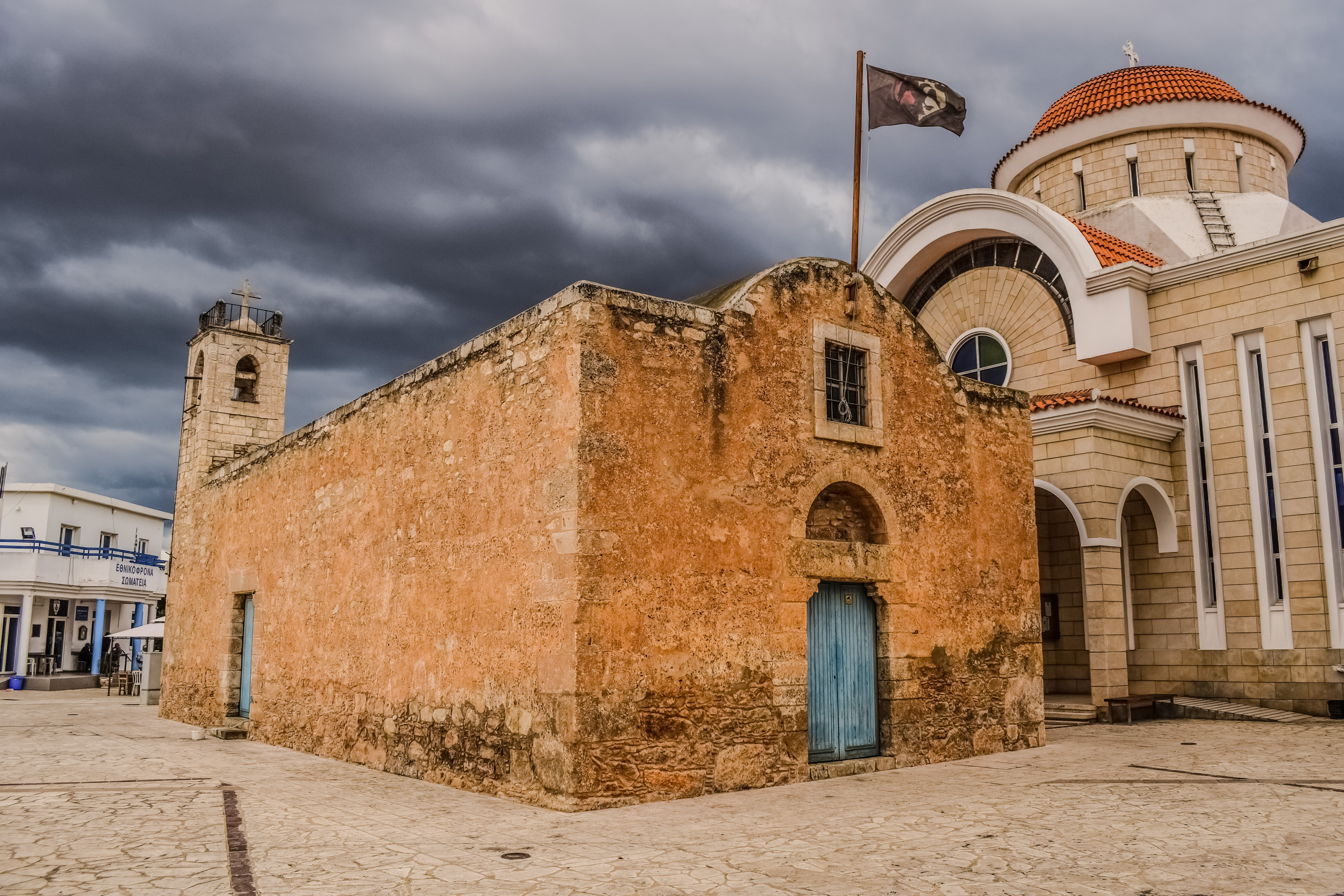
- Agios Georgios church

- Location in Cyprus
- Coordinates: 34°58′30″N 33°51′6″E
- Country: Cyprus
- District: Larnaca District

Population (2011)
  - Total: 6,231
- Time zone: UTC+2 (EET)
  - Summer (DST): UTC+3 (EEST)
- Website: xylophagou.com.cy

Xylofagou (Greek: Ξυλοφάγου; locally [ksiloˈfau]) is a village in the Larnaca District of Cyprus, situated close to the A3 motorway between Paralimni and the British military base Dhekelia.

== Overview ==
Xylofagou's name roughly translates to "wood eaters". It lies on the northern flank of a hill, on the edge of a group of several similar villages collectively known as the Kokkinochoria (Greek: Κοκκινοχώρια) which translates to "red villages" due to their abundance of nutrient-dense red soil in which vegetables—especially the extremely popular potatoes that are eaten island-wide—are grown.

Xylofagou is the site of the oldest known dwarf elephant fossils in Cyprus, assigned to the species Palaeoloxodon xylophagou and dating to around 200,000 years ago. It is also home to a medieval Venetian watchtower. Near Xylofagou is the Cave of the 40 Martyrs, where Christian soldiers sacrificed their lives in the 16th century to evade capture by the Ottomans.

In 2021, to commemorate the role played by locally grown potatoes in the community's growth, a 16-foot-tall fibreglass potato statue nicknamed the "Big Potato" was erected in the village. It proved controversial, with some viral videos mocking its phallic shape. Statue designer George Tasou said of the mockery, "I'm not bothered because it's brought publicity to our village, and I'm hoping it will promote the Cyprus potato around the world."
