= Baluan =

Stratovolcano in the Admiralty Islands

Highest point
- Elevation: 254 m (833 ft)
- Coordinates: 2.57°S 147.28°E

Geography
- Location within Papua New Guinea
- Location: Papua New Guinea, Admiralty Islands

Geology
- Mountain type: Stratovolcano
- Last eruption: Unknown

Baluan is a stratovolcano that is located on the Baluan Island, in the Admiralty Islands. The volcano is considered dormant, though warm springs are present on the island and in 1931 there were unconfirmed reports of an active submarine vent nearby.
