= Pam Islands =

Island group in Papua New Guinea

Coordinates: 2°33′26″S 147°16′58″E

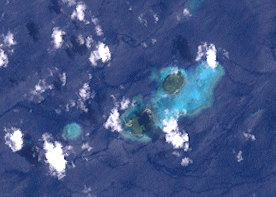
Satellite image of Pam Mandian Island and Pam Lin Island

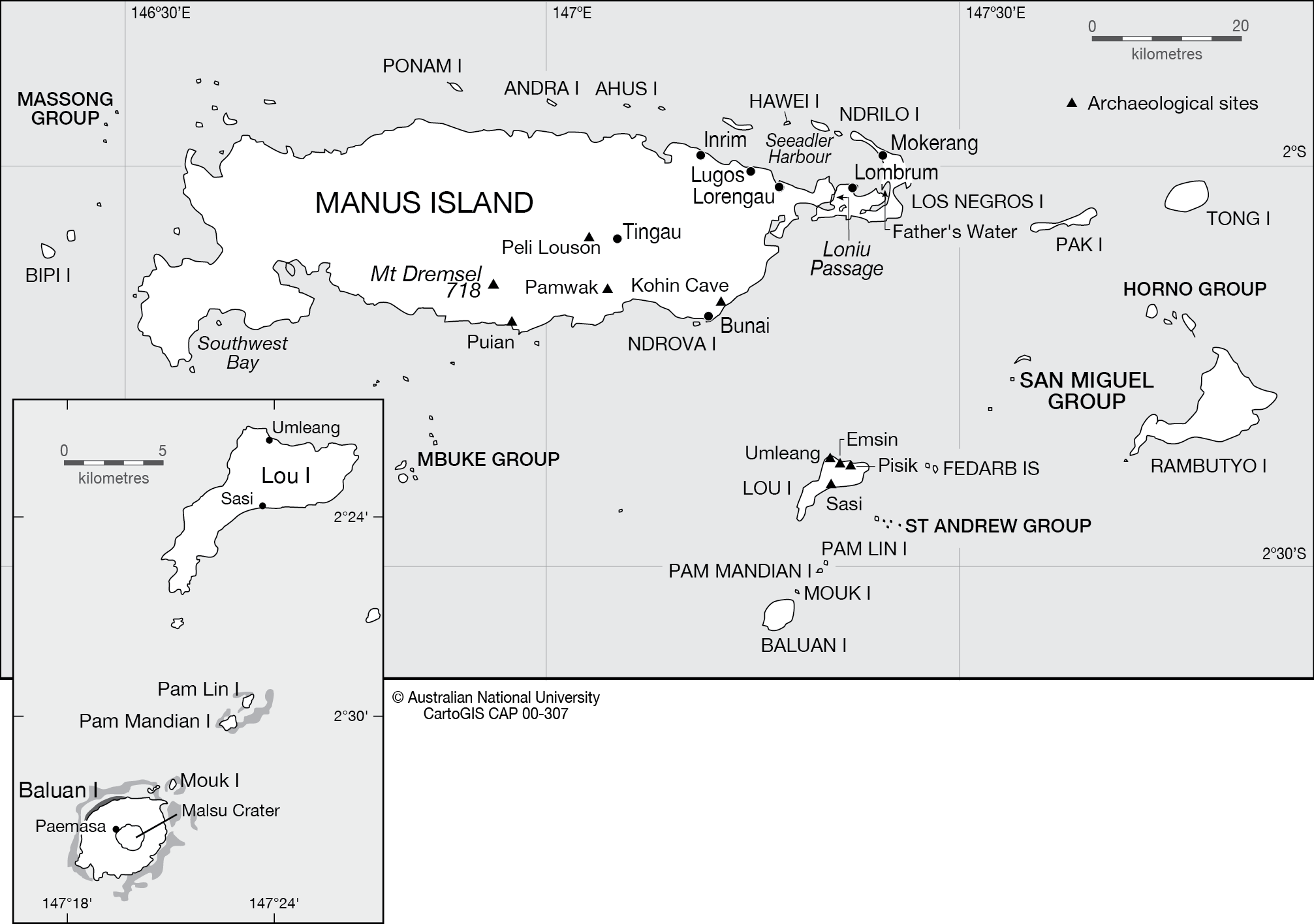
Location of the Pam Islands within the Admiralty Islands

The Pam Islands are an island group of the Admiralty Islands archipelago in the Bismarck Sea, within Papua New Guinea.

They are located to the south of Manus Island, to the south-west of Lou Island. The main island is Baluan Island, heavily forested, which has a settlement called Mouk on its northern coast. The other islands are Pam Mandian Island and Pam Lin Island.

The Baluan-Pam language is spoken here.
