= Baluan-Pam language =

Oceanic language of Manus Province, Papua New Guinea

Baluan-Pam
- Paluai
- Native to: Papua New Guinea
- Region: Baluan Island and Pam Islands, Manus Province
- Native speakers: (2,000 cited 2000)
- Language family: Austronesian: Malayo-Polynesian; Oceanic; Admiralty Islands; Eastern Admiralty Islands; Southeastern islands; Baluan-Pam

Language codes
- ISO 639-3: blq
- Glottolog: balu1257
- ELP: Paluai

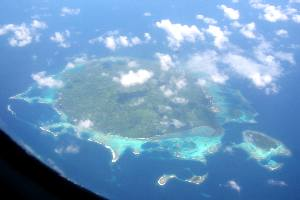
Baluan Island

Baluan-Pam is an Oceanic language of Manus Province, Papua New Guinea. It is spoken on Baluan Island and on nearby Pam Island. The number of speakers, according to the latest estimate based on the 2000 Census, is 2,000. Speakers on Baluan Island prefer to refer to their language with its native name Paluai.

The language is of the agglutinating type with comparatively little productive morphology. Basic constituent order is subject–verb–object (SVO).

== Varieties and related languages ==
The Baluan Island and Pam Island varieties of the language are practically similar, apart from a number of lexical differences. The language is closely related to Lou, spoken on Lou Island. Lou forms a dialect chain, with the varieties spoken on the far side of the island, facing Manus mainland, differing the most from Paluai and the ones on the side facing Baluan Island being the closest.

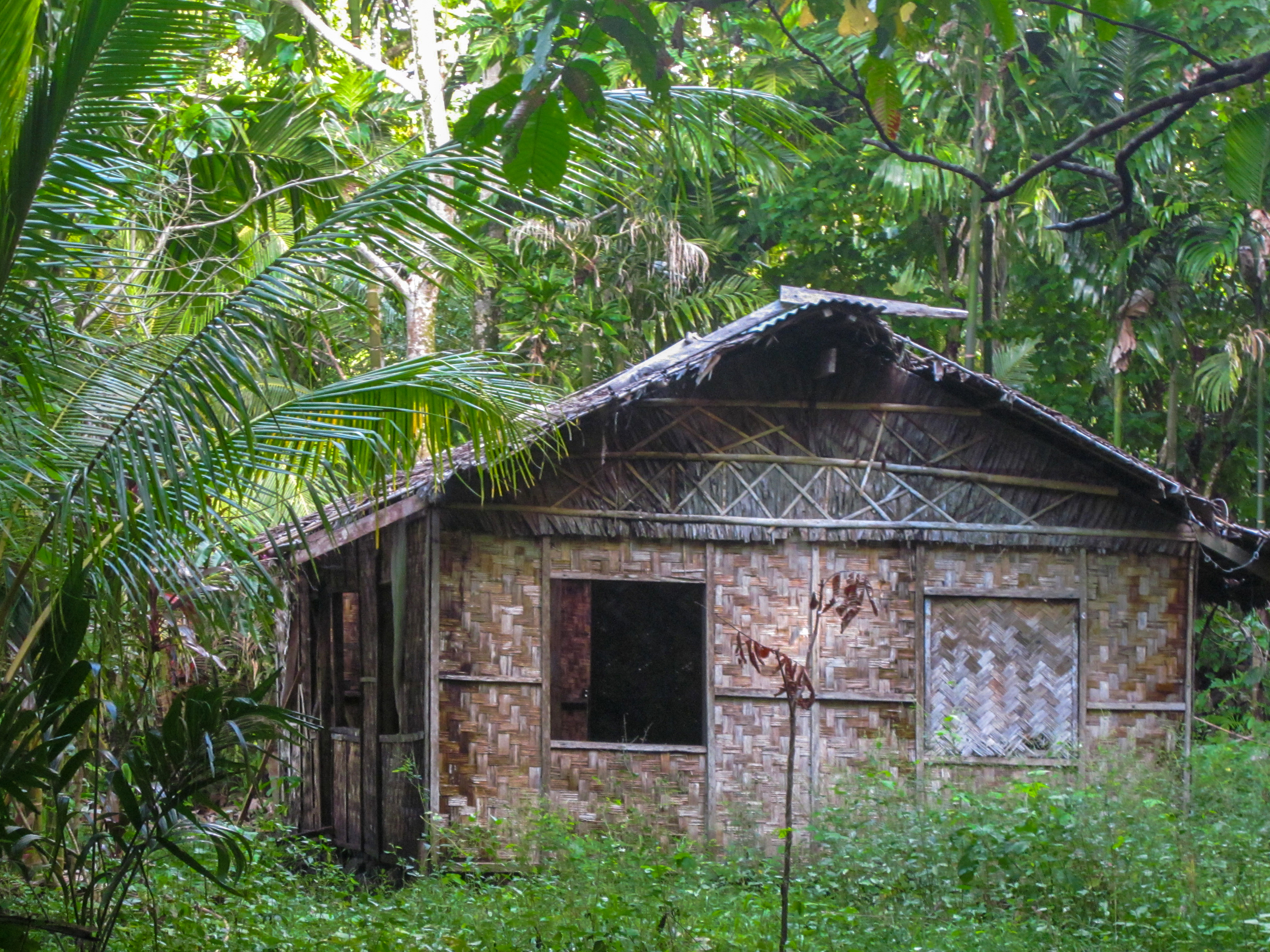
Bush material house

In Manus Province, about 32 languages are spoken, all of which belong to the Admiralties branch, a higher-order subgroup of Oceanic, which belongs to the Malayo-Polynesian branch of Austronesian. Most of the languages of Manus Province are scarcely documented. A reference grammar of Loniu was published in 1994.

There is a minority of Titan speakers on Baluan, relatively recent immigrants living in Mouk village. The Titan people have become well known through the work of Margaret Mead. Many speakers have at least a passive command of Titan and Lou. In addition, the creole language Tok Pisin is widely spoken on the island, and most people have at least a basic command of English.

== Phonology ==
=== Consonant phonemes ===
The table below shows the consonant phonemes in the language.

	Labial		Coronal	Dorsal	
Nasal	m	mʷ	n	ŋ	
Plosive	p	pʷ	t	k	(kʷ)
Fricative			s	(h)	
Approximant			l	(j)	(w)
Vibrant			(ɾ~r)		

In contrast to many of the Manus languages, there are no bilabial trill or prenasalised consonants. The consonant inventory is rather simple, with a labialised nasal and plosive in addition to bilabial, apico-alveolar and dorso-velar stops and nasals. There is just one fricative, /s/, with /h/ being a very marginal phoneme. /t/ has a tap or trill as a variant. The glides [j] and [w] are analysed as non-syllabic variants of /i/ and /u/, respectively.

=== Vowel phonemes ===
The vowels of Baluan-Pam are /i, e, ɛ, ɐ, ɔ, o, u/.

The vowel inventory consists of the standard five vowels most common in Oceanic languages, with two additional segments: open-mid /ɛ/ and /ɔ/, which are much more frequently occurring. For younger speakers, /e/ appears to be merging with /ɛ/ and /o/ appears to be merging with /u/.

=== Syllable structure ===
The syllable template is (C)V(C). Not many syllables start with a vowel. Due to loss of word-final consonants and consequently vowels, which is a feature of eastern Admiralties languages, the language allows consonants in the syllable coda and has many monosyllabic words with CVC form.

== Word classes ==
=== Open classes ===
The two major open word classes are noun and verb (with a major subclass of stative verbs), with adjectives and adverbs as minor classes distinguished from both noun and verb and from each other. Verb to noun and verb to adjective derivations are very common, but not vice versa. Most predicates are headed by a verb complex, but nouns, adjectives, numerals and some prepositions can also function as predicate head. Only verbs, however, can take bound pronouns and be modified by tense–aspect–mood (TAM) particles.

=== Closed classes ===
The major closed classes in the language, containing function words, are pronouns, demonstratives, prepositions, numerals, quantifiers, and interrogative words. The pronominal system distinguishes singular, dual, paucal and plural number and first, second and third person, but not gender. The range of adpositional forms is limited, since most spatial relations are expressed either by a directly possessed spatial noun, or by a serial verb construction containing a directional.

== Grammar ==
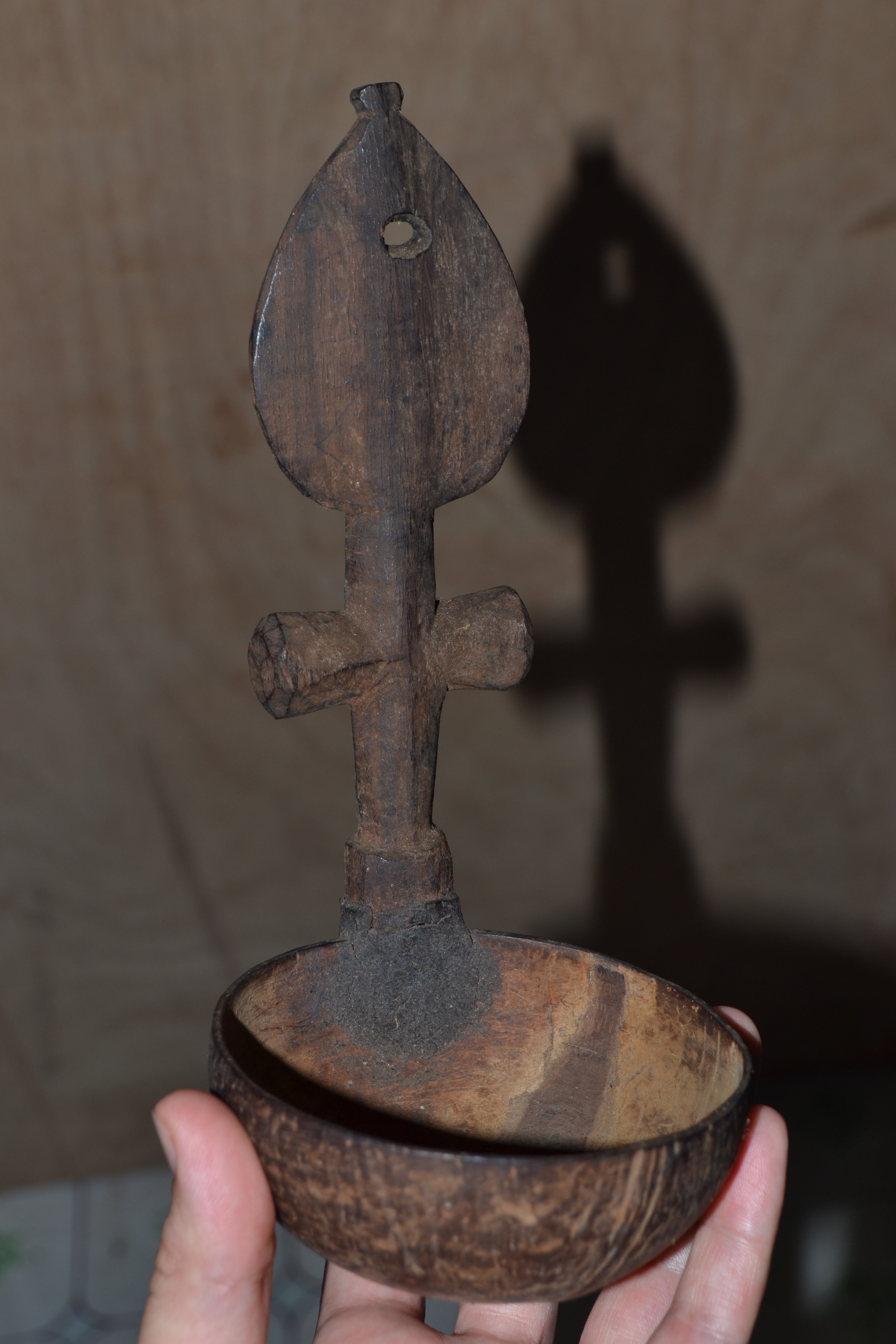
Ladle made from coconut shell

=== Nominal morphology ===
The language does not have case or number marking on nouns. The only nominal morphology in the language functions to indicate possession. A distinction is made within nominal possessive constructions between direct and indirect possession. This correlates with, but does not coincide completely with, a semantic distinction between inalienable and alienable possession. With direct possession, a suffix indicating person and number of the possessor is added directly to the noun stem. With indirect possession, this suffix is added to a postposed possessive particle ta-. Most kinship terms and body part terms either can or must be used in a direct possessive construction. In addition, spatial nouns, referring to concepts such as "inside", "on top of" and "behind", are obligatorily used in a direct possessive construction.

=== Verbal morphology ===
Verbal derivational morphology is limited to the causative prefix pe-, the applicative suffix -ek, and reduplication.

==== Causative ====
The causative pe- makes transitive an intransitive verb. Causatives can be productively formed, but only with stative verbs. A causative adds an extra "causer" A argument, demoting the original S argument of the intransitive verb to O position. Examples are mat 'die, be dead' → pemat 'kill'.

==== Applicative ====
The applicative in this language is a valency-rearranging rather than a valency-increasing device. It promotes an instrumental Oblique constituent of a verb to O position. The original O is not demoted, but rather follows the promoted constituent as a second object. The applicative is typically encountered in one specific discourse/information structure context. It is used as an anaphorical device to refer back to an item mentioned just before, usually in the previous clause, as in the example below:

ope lêp suep a ope yilek ponat
wo=pe lêp suep a wo=pe yil-ek=Ø ponat
2SG=PFV take hoe and 2SG=PFV dig-APPL=3SG.ZERO soil
‘You will take a hoe and you will dig the ground with it.’ [lit. ‘dig-with (it) the ground’]

==== Reduplication ====
With transitive verbs, full or partial reduplication can be used as an intransitivising device. With intransitive verbs, reduplication adds aspectual meanings such as continuous aspect. A second function of reduplication within the verb class is to derive nominalizations.

=== Demonstratives ===
Demonstratives in Paluai utilise a three-way distinction pattern based upon person (near speaker, near addressee or neither) or relative distance (close, intermediate, distant).

These three distinctions can be defined as

1. position at or very close to the deictic centre, proximate
2. an intermediate position
3. a position considered to be significant distance from the deictic centre

Here the deictic centre refers to the speaker.

When considering discourse deixis, demonstratives will function as anaphors (referring to previously mentioned information) or cataphors (referring forward).

Basic forms as well as forms prefixed by te- that are either proximate or distal are usually cataphors. Meanwhile, forms beginning with ta- are often used as anaphors, in addition to all intermediate forms despite prefixes.

Three basic forms
word	degree	English gloss
Pwo	proximate	'this'
Yo	intermediate	'that'
Lo	distal	'that (far)'

The above three demonstratives are often used to modify pronouns as seen in examples 1–2.

i pwo, moni reo pepa sangal
yi pwo moni te-yo pepa sangal
3SG DEM.PROX money EMP-DEM.INT ten.kina ten
‘Here. The money is one hundred kina.’ [said when the money is handed over]

i o. naman kamou rang teo inêm
yi yo naman kamou ta-ng te-yo yi=nêm
3SG DEM.INT perhaps speech POSS-1SG EMP-DEM.INT 3SG=be.finished
‘That’s it. Perhaps my talk is finished.’
Example of anaphor – refers to previously mentioned discourse

It is unusual for either three of the basic demonstrative forms to modify nouns and it is also uncommon that the distal form lo is used in discourse, rather used to indicate to a distant object.

==== Formative te- ====
Forms tepwo, teyo and telo have the ability to modify both nouns and pronouns and are more common in the Paluai language than basic forms of demonstratives.

Te- is classed as an emphatic marker and is used in conjunction with the basic demonstrative form.

Since forms with te- must always modify either a noun or a pronoun, they cannot occur independently.

Examples 3–5 show use of each demonstrative form with formative te-

on pwa mun tepwo iro Paluai?
wo=an pwa mun te-pwo yi=to Paluai
2SG=PRF think banana EMP-DEM.PROX 3SG=be Baluan
‘Do you think this kind of banana grows on Baluan?’
Example of cataphor – refers forward

mun teo i makerin sip pwên
mun te-yo yi ma=kerin sip pwên
banana EMP-DEM.INT 3SG NEG1=bunch one.INANIM NEG2
‘Those bananas, they are not in a bunch.’
Example of anaphor, refers to previously mentioned discourse.

te yoy reo, yamat te i pari ai pusungop turê tepwo mwanen teo ipwak ai
te yoy te-yo yamat te yi pari a-yi pusungop ta-urê te-pwo mwanenen te-yo yi=pwak a-yii
SUB stone EMP-DEM.INT person REL 3SG belonging.to at-3SG clan POSS-1PC.EXCL EMP-DEM.PROX straight EMP-DEM.INT 3SG=meet at-3SG
‘As for these stones, this person who is straight from our clan encountered them.’

kei raywei relo ila ro monokinirê
kei ta-yuei te-lo yi=la to monoki-n-irê
tree DEF-two.long EMP-DEM.DIST 3SG=go.to be behind-PERT-3PC
‘Those two trees are behind them.’
Example of cataphor – refers forward

==== Spatial deictics with a- ====
Another set of demonstratives is formed by prefixing emplatic particle te- with preposition a- to form a spatial adverbial demonstrative of which has the ability to modify verbs only.

Atepwo, ateyo and atelo refer to the location where the activity described by verb is held.

wosa yen arepwo pwên
wo=sa yen a-te-pwo pwên
2SG=MOD lie at-EMP-DEM.PROX NEG
‘You cannot lie here.’

wuisot kunawayut areo
wui=sot kunawayut a-te-yo
1DU.EXCL=go.up take.rest at-EMP-DEM.INT
‘We went up to take a rest there.’

ola lêp kong payanpôl sip te ila ro arelo me
wo=la lêp ka-ng payan.pôl sip te yi=la to a-te-lo me
2SG=go.to take CLF.food-1SG.PERT dry.coconut one.INANIM REL 3SG=go.to be at-EMP-DEM.DIST come
‘You go and take my coconut (for me to eat) that is over there, and bring it here.’

==== Demonstrative: free forms with ta- ====
This complex demonstrative uses formative ta-, the emphatic particle te- and a basic form of demonstrative. In comparison to the earlier mentioned demonstrative forms, free forms with ta- often have an element of definiteness when referring to a subject/object. It is the one form of demonstrative that can be used independently and can therefore substitute the place of a noun and be the subject or object to a verb in noun phrases. Three forms with formative ta- include tatepwo, tateyo and tatelo. Here the proximate and distal demonstrative function as verbless clause subject, whilst the intermediate demonstrative functions as a transitive object.

Nulik, tarepwo ran sê?
Nulik ta-te-pwo ta-n sê
Nulik DEF-EMP-DEM.PROX POSS-PERT who
‘Nulik, whose is this?’

irouek nêm tareo la ran pein teo
yi=touek nêm ta-te-yo la ta-n pein te-yo
3SG=show be.finished DEF-EMP-DEM.INT go.to POSS-PERT woman EMP-DEM.INT
‘She showed all that [what has been talked about just before] to the woman.’

tarelo yeuyeu
ta-te-lo yeuyeu
DEF-EMP-DEM.DIST star
‘Those are stars.’

== Pronouns ==
=== Paradigms ===
There are four pronominal paradigms: free subject forms, bound subject forms, object forms and possessive forms. They are formally very similar. Pronouns distinguish singular, dual, paucal and plural number, and have a clusivity distinction. Dual refers to two entities, paucal refers to a few (any number between three and about ten), and plural refers to many. Inclusive pronouns include the addressee ('we, including you'), whereas exclusive ones exclude them ('we, but not you'). Below, the paradigm for the free forms is given.

		Singular	Dual	Paucal	Plural
1st person	Exclusive	wong	wui	wure	ep
1st person	Inclusive	—N/a	tau	tare	tap
2nd person		wo	au	are	ap
3rd person		yi	u	ire	ip

== Directional system ==
=== Forms in the paradigm ===
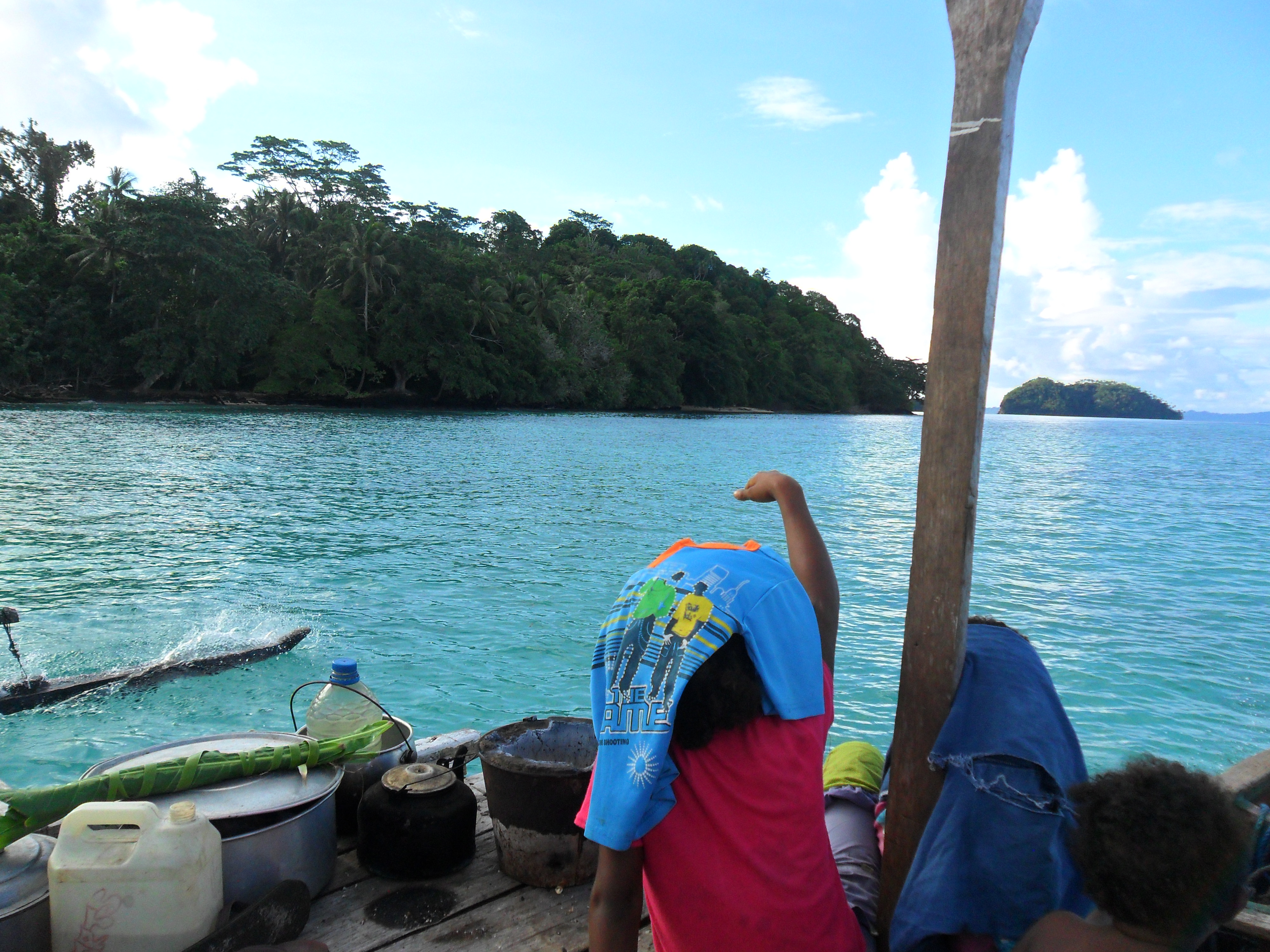
Navigating the outrigger canoe

The language has a system of directionals composed of ten members, eight of which are specified with regard to an absolute frame of reference (FoR). An absolute FoR is based on fixed bearings, such as where the sun rises or sets or wind directions. In Baluan-Pam the FoR is based on a land-sea axis; a distinction is made between:

1. seaward movement
2. landward movement
3. movement parallel to the shore

Therefore, going inland always means going up, and going towards the shore always means going down. In addition, since motion parallel to the shore (i.e. intersecting the land–sea axis) usually means moving on more or less the same level, this has obtained a secondary meaning of 'moving on a horizontal level'. At sea, the system is extrapolated: thus, for moving towards the shore the same directionals are used as for moving inland, and for moving out to sea the same directionals are used as for moving towards the shore when on land.

The directionals are organised along two dimensions: absolute FoR and deixis. The table below shows the paradigm.

	down, seaward (on land); out to sea (on water)	up, landward (on land); toward the shore (on water)	parallel to shore	not specified
away from deictic centre	suwot	sot	wot	la, lak
toward deictic centre	si	sa, sak	—N/a	me
not deictically anchored	suwen	sen	wen	—N/a

The deixis distinction cross-cuts with the FoR distinction, so that five terms are specified for FoR and for deixis, three are specified for FoR only, and two are specified for deixis but not FoR. There is no dedicated term for motion toward the deictic centre parallel to the shore, and no unspecified term that is not deictically anchored (such a term would not add any information to a lexical verb of motion).

=== Use of directionals ===
The directional paradigm provides a very precise reference structure with ample use in discourse. For virtually all actions that in some sense involve motion (including perception-based actions such as seeing/looking, speaking or listening), the direction of the action has to be specified with a directional. In Paluai, this is done by a serial verb construction (SVC), in which a directional either precedes or follows the main verb. Directional SVCs are a common feature of Oceanic languages.
