= Balopa Rural LLG =

Local-level government in Papua New Guinea

- Country: Papua New Guinea
- Province: Manus Province
- Time zone: UTC+10 (AEST)

Balopa Rural LLG is a local-level government (LLG) of Manus Province, Papua New Guinea.

== Wards ==
- 01. Mouk
- 02. Lipan
- 03. Sone
- 04. Parioi
- 05. Buiat
- 06. Baon
- 07. Solang
- 08. Rei
- 09. Lako
