= Euripides L. Evriviades =

Cypriot diplomat (born 1954)

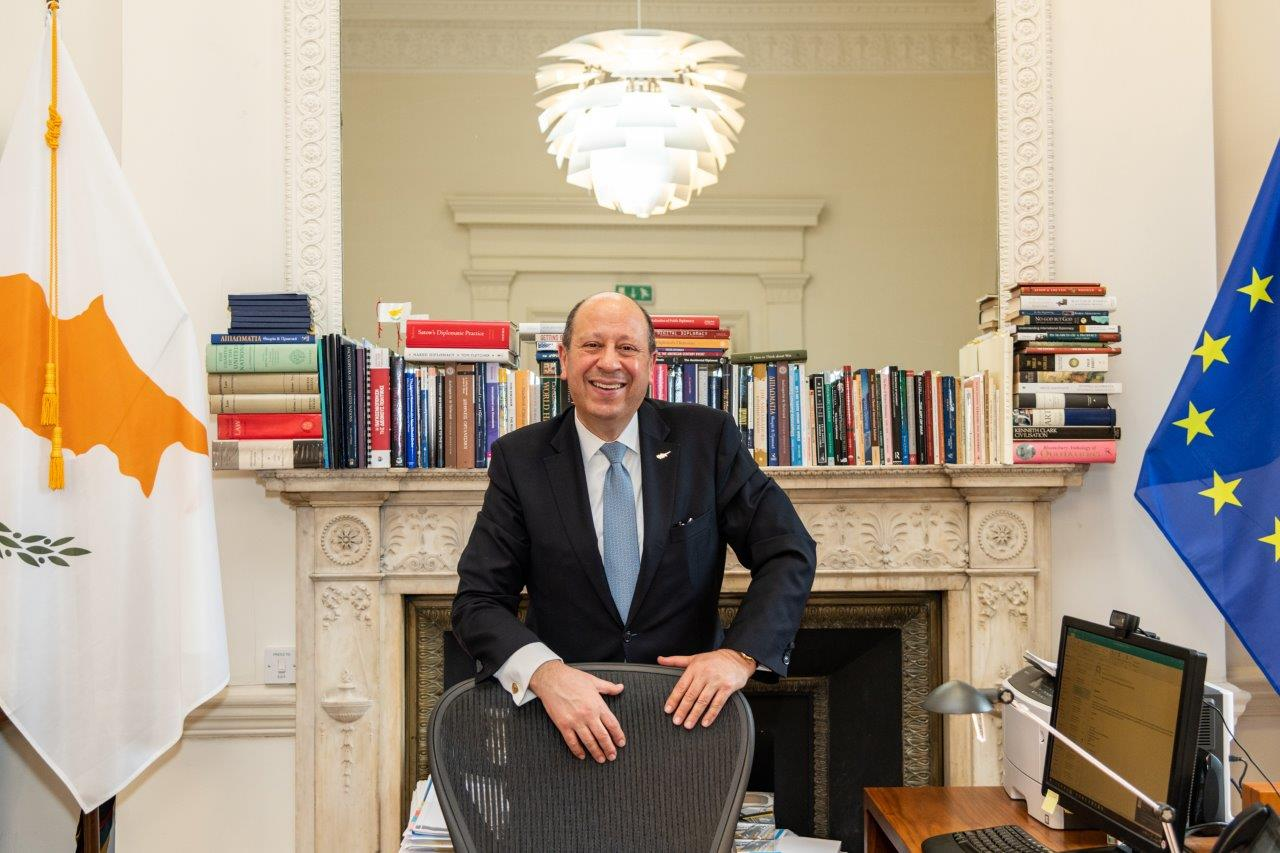

High Commissioner of the Republic of Cyprus to the UK
- In office 4 November 2013 – 31 August 2019
- President: Nicos Anastasiades
- Preceded by: Alexandros Zenon
- Succeeded by: Andreas S. Kakouris

Deputy Permanent Secretary / Political Director of the Ministry of Foreign Affairs
- In office January 2012 – November 2013

Ambassador / Permanent Representative to the Council of Europe
- In office November 2008 – January 2012

Political Director of the Ministry of Foreign Affairs
- In office 2006–2008

Ambassador to the United States of America
- In office 2003–2006

Ambassador to the Netherlands
- In office 2000–2003

Ambassador to Israel
- In office 1997–2000

Personal details
- Education: University of New Hampshire

Euripides L. Evriviades (Greek: Ευριπίδης Λ. Ευρυβιάδης, born 1954) is a Cypriot former diplomat who served as High Commissioner of Cyprus to the UK, accredited to the Court of St. James's and Permanent Representative of Cyprus to the International Maritime Organization (IMO). He chaired the Board of Governors of the Commonwealth Secretariat, having previously chaired its executive committee. He was born in Larnaca, Cyprus and is married to Anastasia Iacovidou-Evriviades, an attorney-at-law.

== Biography ==
Euripides L. Evriviades is High Commissioner of the Republic of Cyprus to the United Kingdom of Great Britain and Northern Ireland as of 4 November 2013. Before assuming this post, he was Deputy Permanent Secretary / Political Director of the Ministry of Foreign Affairs (Jan. 2012–Nov. 2013) serving, intermittently, as Acting Permanent Secretary. Prior, he served as Ambassador / Permanent Representative to the Council of Europe (Nov. 2008–Jan. 2012), having also chaired its Rapporteur Group on External Relations (2011). Previously, he was Political Director of the Ministry (2006–2008), having concurrent accreditation to the State of Kuwait, pro tem Nicosia.

Mr Evriviades was Ambassador to the United States of America and non-resident High Commissioner to Canada, serving concomitantly as: the Permanent Representative to the International Civil Aviation Organization; the Permanent Observer to the Organization of American States; and Representative to the World Bank and the International Monetary Fund (2003–2006). He also served as ambassador to the Netherlands (2000–2003) and to Israel (1997–2000). Earlier in his career, he held positions at Cypriot embassies in Bonn, Germany (1986–1988); Moscow, USSR/Russia (1988–1993); and Tripoli, Libya (1995).

He started his diplomatic career in 1976 at the Cyprus Consulate General in New York as Vice-Consul (1976–78) and later as Consul (1978–1982). He also held the position of First Secretary at the Permanent Mission of Cyprus to the United Nations (1980–1982). From 1976 to 1980, he was a member of the Cyprus Delegation to the Third United Nations Conference on the Law of the Sea (4th–10th sessions).

High Commissioner Evriviades holds a master's degree in Public Administration (MPA - policy area of concentration: International Affairs and Security) from the John F Kennedy School of Government, Harvard University (1984) which he attended as a Fulbright Fellow. He graduated (cum laude, 1976) with a Bachelor of Science degree in Business Administration from the University of New Hampshire.

He received a Doctor of Laws, Honoris Causa, from his alma mater, the University of New Hampshire (21 May 2005).

== Published works ==
Evriviades has published articles on the Cyprus question, on Turkey, security issues of the Eastern Mediterranean, on the Law of the Sea and on diplomacy. He also lectured extensively on these issues. Some of his most recent articles include:

- 2026: Κύπρος και οι Βάσεις, PhileNews, 31/3
- 2026: Ιράν: Η παράδοξη λογική της νίκης στον ασύμμετρο πόλεμο, PhileNews, 23/3
- 2026: Iran: the paradoxical logic of victory in an asymmetric war, The Cyprus Mail, 15/3
- 2026: Κλιμάκωση και το αναπάντητο ερώτημα της επόμενης μέρας, PhileNews, 9/3
- 2026: Iran and the limits of force, The Cyprus Mail, 8/3
- 2026: Από τον διάλογο των Μηλίων σε μια νέα αταξία, PhileNews, 2/3
- 2026: When power increasingly ceases to recognise legality, The Cyprus Mail, 1/3
- 2026: Η επόμενη μέρα μετά το Ιράν: Ισχύς, στρατηγική και το αναπάντητο ερώτημα, PhileNews, 24/2
- 2026: Iran: regime change is a slogan, not a plan, The Cyprus Mail, 8/2
- 2026: Πρόταση Τραμπ για Γροιλανδία: Παράδοξη ή συνέχεια μιας διαχρονικής στρατηγικής των ΗΠΑ;, PhileNews
- 2026: Trump and Greenland: not a joke, but a US strategy all along, The Cyprus Mail
- 2026: Τι είναι ο υβριδικός πόλεμος, τι δεν είναι και γιατί μας αφορά, PhileNews
- 2026: Understanding hybrid war, The Cyprus Mail
- 2025: Ο ελιγμός των δύο κρατών – Η στρατηγική της Άγκυρας στην Κύπρο, PhileNews
- 2025: The two-state gambit: Decoding Turkey’s strategic play in Cyprus, PhileNews
- 2025: Διπλωματία, Μακιαβέλι και η Τεχνητή Νοημοσύνη, PhileNews
- 2025: Diplomacy, Machiavelli and AI, The Cyprus Mail
- 2025: Μέγας Αλέξανδρος- Ο πρωτοδιπλωμάτης; PhileNews
- 2025: Alexander the Great: the proto-diplomat?, The Cyprus Mail
- 2025: H «Φάρμα των Ζώων» στα 80 – Η προειδοποίηση του Όργουελ για την αλήθεια και την εξουσία, PhileNews
- 2025: Animal Farm at 80: Orwell’s diachronic warning on truth and power, The Cyprus Mail
- 2025: Systemic, Not Episodic: The Morphing of Middle East Diplomacy, In Depth Vol. 22 – Issue 3, Sept 2025 (pp. 20-23)
- 2025: Αναβολή ηθικής διπλωματίας – Το Ισραήλ και οι Γενοκτονίες των Αρμενίων, των Ασσυρίων και των Ελλήνων, PhileNews
- 2025: Moral diplomacy deferred, The Cyprus Mail
- 2025: Op-ed: Israel, Iran, and the strategic recomposition of the Middle East, PhileNews
- 2025: Cyprus and Lebanon: ancient bonds, modern challenges, The Cyprus Mail
- 2025: Εισερχόμαστε σε μια νέα φάση με μια Μέση Ανατολή χωρίς σαφή ρυθμιστή, όπου η ισχύς, η εξουσία, η αποτροπή και η επιβίωση επανακαθορίζονται: Το Ισραήλ, το Ιράν και η στρατηγική ανασύνθεση της περιοχής, Hellas Journal
- 2025: Κύπρος και Ινδία: Από την αδέσμευτη στη στρατηγική συστράτευση, PhileNews
- 2025: Cyprus and India: from non-alignment to strategic alignment, The Cyprus Mail
- 2025: Op-ed: Cyprus whole and free – Why the Hahn mission must not fail, PhileNews
- 2025: Είναι ο πόλεμος αναπόφευκτος; – Η Παγίδα του Θουκυδίδη και το δίλημμα ΗΠΑ-Κίνας, PhileNews
- 2025: The Thucydides Trap and the US-China conundrum, The Cyprus Mail
- 2025: Ο Τραμπ στη Χώρα των Θαυμάτων, PhileNews
- 2025: Trump in Wonderland: foreign policy through the looking glass, The Cyprus Mail
- 2025: Artificial Intelligence, security and cooperation in the European Union, The Cyprus Mail
- 2025: The Eastern Mediterranean: Cyprus and the Geopolitics of Turkish Irredentism, RUSI - Royal United Services Institute
- 2025: The East Med: Cyprus and the geopolitics of Turkish irredentism, The Cyprus Mail
- 2024: Sir Keir Starmer’s visit: an opportunity for a new strategic partnership, The Cyprus Mail
- 2024: Dr Strangelove in Ukraine and the Middle East, The Cyprus Mail
- 2024: «Αὐτοῦ γὰρ καὶ Ῥόδος καὶ πήδημα»: Κύριος Μη-Νατοϊκός Σύμμαχος των Αμερικανών η Κύπρος; Τα πλεονεκτήματα και τα οφέλη, δεν απαιτείται η συγκατάθεση της Τουρκίας…, HellasJournal
- 2024: A “hic Rhodus, hic salta” challenge: Make the Republic of Cyprus a “Major Non- NATO Ally” of the United States, HellasJournal
- 2024: Ενώπιον σε decoupling των ΗΠΑ από τα ευρωπαϊκά δρώμενα; PhileNews
- 2024: Despite bellicose rhetoric, Trump is unlikely to radically change US foreign policy, The Cyprus Mail
- 2024: Κύπρος και ασφάλεια: Κύριος Μη-Νατοϊκός Σύμμαχος των ΗΠΑ;, Αγγελιαφόρος
- 2024: Nato, Cyprus and the final leap, The Cyprus Mail
- 2024: Λύση χωρίς κυπριακό, PhileNews
- 2024: In the wake of aggression: Navigating diplomacy between Israel and Iran, PhileNews
- 2024: Ισραήλ και Ιράν: Η ώρα της διπλωματίας;, PhileNews
- 2023: The Cyprus Problem can be solved, The Cyprus Mail
- 2022: The New Cold War and Ukraine, RUSI - Royal United Services Institute
- 2018: A Reinvigorated Commonwealth, Diplomat Magazine
- 2018: Cyprus as an EU and Commonwealth Member State: Its Hopes and Ambitions, The Round Table: The Commonwealth Journal of International Affairs, VOL 107, NO. 2, 251–253
- 2017:The Food of Love, Diplomat Magazine
- 2017: Cyprus, the EU and the Eastern Mediterranean, Global Strategy Forum Lecture Series 2016–2017
- 2016:Diplomacy and the Politics of Fear, Diplomat Magazine
- 2016: #SHAKESPEARE400 - To Tweet or Not To Tweet?, Diplomat Magazine
- 2016: High Commissioner for the Republic of Cyprus to the UK: “A Brexit would not be in the interests of the Commonwealth”, LSE EUROPP Blog
- 2015:A European Island in the Commonwealth, Diplomat Magazine
- 2005: "Cyprus in the European Union: Prospects for Reunification, Peace with Turkey, and Regional Stability", Mediterranean Quarterly: A Journal of Global Issues, Vol.: 16, Number 3
- 2005: "Why Cyprus, Perhaps Surprisingly, Wants Turkey to Join the [EU] Club", European Affairs, Vol:6, Number 4, pp 55-58
- 2001: US-Turkey Contingency Planning and Soviet Reaction 1978–1983, THEMATA Policy & Defense, Defense Analysis Institute, Athens

== Honours, decorations, awards and distinctions ==
Awards

- Award for Distinguished Contribution to Diplomacy in London (London, 2017)
- Voted by his peers as Diplomat of Year from Europe (London, 2015)
- The King Legacy Award for International Service, by the Committee on the International Salute to the Life and Legacy of Dr. Martin Luther King Jr., A Man for All Nations (Washington DC, 2006)
- "Ambassador of the Year", by the Stichting Vrienden van Saur ("Friends of Saur") Foundation (The Hague, October 2003)

Decorations

- Freeman of the City of London (London, 23 January 2017)
- Great Commander of the Order of the Orthodox Knights of the Church of the Holy Sepulcher (Jerusalem, February 2000)
- Order of Merit (First Class) of the Federal Republic of Germany (Bonn, March 1989)
