= International Cocoa Organization =

International organization of cocoa producing and consuming countries

The International Cocoa Organization (ICCO) is a global organization, composed of both cocoa producing and cocoa consuming countries with a membership. Located in Abidjan, ICCO was established in 1973 to put into effect the first International Cocoa Agreement which was negotiated in Geneva at a United Nations International Cocoa Conference. There have since been seven Agreements. The Seventh International Cocoa Agreement was negotiated in Geneva in 2010 and came into force provisionally on 1 October 2012.

The ICCO serves as a platform for stakeholders in the global cocoa industry to discuss topics relevant to international cocoa trade. It is a leading source of cocoa statistics globally, with data spanning nearly 70 years. Additionally, the ICCO offers expertise in cocoa market analysis and forecasting, project development and implementation, as well as capacity-building programs for its member countries.

ICCO Member countries represent roughly 86% of world cocoa production and more than 72% of world cocoa consumption. All Members are represented in the International Cocoa Council, the highest governing body of the ICCO.

The Consultative Board consists of fourteen international experts in the cocoa sector, all from the private sector (seven from cocoa producing Member countries and seven from cocoa consuming Member countries). However, the Board, whose mandate is as extensive as that of the International Cocoa Council and comprises all aspects of the world cocoa economy, only functions in an advisory capacity, as all final decisions are taken by the International Cocoa Council. The Consultative Board was established in recognition of the importance of the private sector in the world cocoa economy and of the increasingly important role that trade and industry have been playing in the ICCO.

The ICCO also sets forth definitions within the cocoa industry to establish a common ground. Some notable terms include: Sustainable Cocoa Economy, Ethical Cocoa, Fine Flavour Cacao, and Cocoa year.

International Cocoa Organization Members
Country	Status	Signature	Ratification/Approval/Acceptance
Brazil	Exporting Country	7 June 2012	–
Cameroon	Exporting Country	26 March 2012	Provisional: 24 January 2013
Colombia	Exporting Country	7 December 2021	–
Congo (Democratic Republic)	Exporting Country	4 November 2011	Provisional: 4 November 2011
Côte d'Ivoire	Exporting Country	20 September 2011	Approval: 16 May 2012
Dominican Republic	Exporting Country	9 March 2012	Provisional: 9 March 2012
Ecuador	Exporting Country	25 September 2013	–
Gabon	Exporting Country	18 January 2012	Approval: 11 June 2013
Ghana	Exporting Country	19 August 2011	Ratification: 18 December 2012
Guinea	Exporting Country	19 June 2012	–
Indonesia	Exporting Country	12 September 2011	Ratification: 13 November 2012
Liberia	Exporting Country	13 November 2012	Acceptance: 17 January 2014
Madagascar	Exporting Country	29 December 2015	Provisional: 29 December 2015
Malaysia	Exporting Country	5 August 2013	Ratification: 30 August 2013
Nicaragua	Exporting Country	15 July 2013	–
Nigeria	Exporting Country	10 October 2018	–
Papua New Guinea	Exporting Country	21 April 2016	–
Peru	Exporting Country	4 March 2014	Ratification: 12 May 2016
Sierra Leone	Exporting Country	1 October 2012	–
Togo	Exporting Country	19 September 2011	Ratification: 22 June 2012
Trinidad and Tobago	Exporting Country	24 September 2012	–
Venezuela (Bolivarian Republic of)	Exporting Country	27 June 2016	–
Austria	Importing Country	–	–
Belgium	Importing Country	–	–
Bulgaria	Importing Country	–	–
Croatia	Importing Country	–	–
Cyprus	Importing Country	–	–
Czech Republic	Importing Country	–	–
Denmark	Importing Country	–	–
Estonia	Importing Country	–	–
Finland	Importing Country	–	–
France	Importing Country	–	–
Germany	Importing Country	–	–
Greece	Importing Country	–	–
Hungary	Importing Country	–	–
Ireland	Importing Country	–	–
Italy	Importing Country	–	–
Latvia	Importing Country	–	–
Lithuania	Importing Country	–	–
Luxembourg	Importing Country	–	–
Malta	Importing Country	–	–
Netherlands	Importing Country	–	–
Poland	Importing Country	–	–
Portugal	Importing Country	–	–
Romania	Importing Country	–	–
Slovakia	Importing Country	–	–
Slovenia	Importing Country	–	–
Spain	Importing Country	–	–
Sweden	Importing Country	–	–
Russian Federation	Importing Country	1 October 2014	Ratification: 29 January 2016
Switzerland	Importing Country	22 December 2010	Ratification: 12 May 2011

Overview

The International Cocoa Organization (ICCO) was established in 1973 to put into effect the first International Cocoa Agreement which was negotiated in Geneva Switzerland at a United Nations International Cocoa Conference. The International Cocoa Organization is a global organization composed of both cocoa producing and cocoa consuming countries with a membership Formerly, ICCO was headquartered in England London but on September 25, 2015, the International Cocoa Council (ICC) which is the highest authority, unanimously approved the relocation of ICCO from London England together with its secretariat to Abidjan, Cote d'lvoire. This was done in order to be closer to major Cocoa producing regions

The reason why originally ICCO was headquartered in London lies in the fact that in the 19th century the Quaker businessmen entered the Cocoa business and used their skills to improve the living conditions for factory workers as well as making both chocolate and Cocoa inexpensive and available to the locals. Since ICCO establishment in 1973, there have since been seven ICCO Agreements. The Seventh International Cocoa Agreement was negotiated in Geneva in 2010 and came into force provisionally on 1 October 2012.

Governance

The ICCO Secretariat is the executive body tasked with the responsibility for implementation of the Organization's five year strategic plan based in the organization's headquarters in Abidjan Cote d'lvoire. The Secretariat reports to the International cocoa council while the Administration and Finance Committee, economic committee as well as the Private Sector (consultative) Board are all under the Secretariat according to the ICCO Structure

Quarterly Bulletin of Cocoa Statistics (QBCS) provides reliable and up-to-date data analysis of Cocoa economy since 1960 on both Cocoa producing and Cocoa consuming countries According to ICCO QBCS most recent revised forecasts for the year 2023/2024 global productions and grindings declined by -11.7% to 4.461 million tonnes and by -4.3% to 4.855 million tonnes Cote d'lvoire is the world's leading cocoa producing country followed by Ghana. Ghana produces the most quality Cocoa seeds by the help of Quality Control Company QCC which is a subsidiary of COCOBOD. COCOBOD had played a significant role to tremendous increment in Cocoa production in Ghana as it gains its support measures from the Ghanaian government.

ICCO Challenges

Human slavery and child labor are some of the current challenges that ICCO is battling to solve in west Africa specifically Ivory Coast and Ghana. Young boys and girls as young as 12 to 16 years old are lured from their homes then sold to cacao plantation owners in Ivory Coast where they worked as field hands, domestic workers and even prostitutes. In 2001, 40% of Chocolate consumed in the developed world was produced by child slavery and up to 1 million children in both Ghana and Ivory Coast as young as 10 years old are estimated to have been working on harvesting farms of cacao beans who had never attended school. ICCO in partnership with the west African governments and other NGOS are working closely to end this child labor and slavery.

On November 27, 2024, a new framework of action was signed in Abidjan Cote d'lvoire by the governments of Cote d'lvoire, Ghana, and the United States Department of Labor to coordinate and accelerate the prevention of this child labor in these major cocoa producing countries
