= Lou Island =

Island in Papua New Guinea

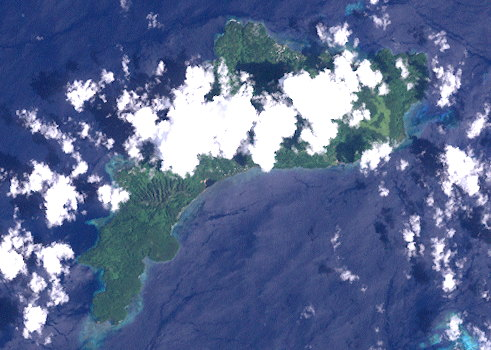
- Landsat image of Lou Island

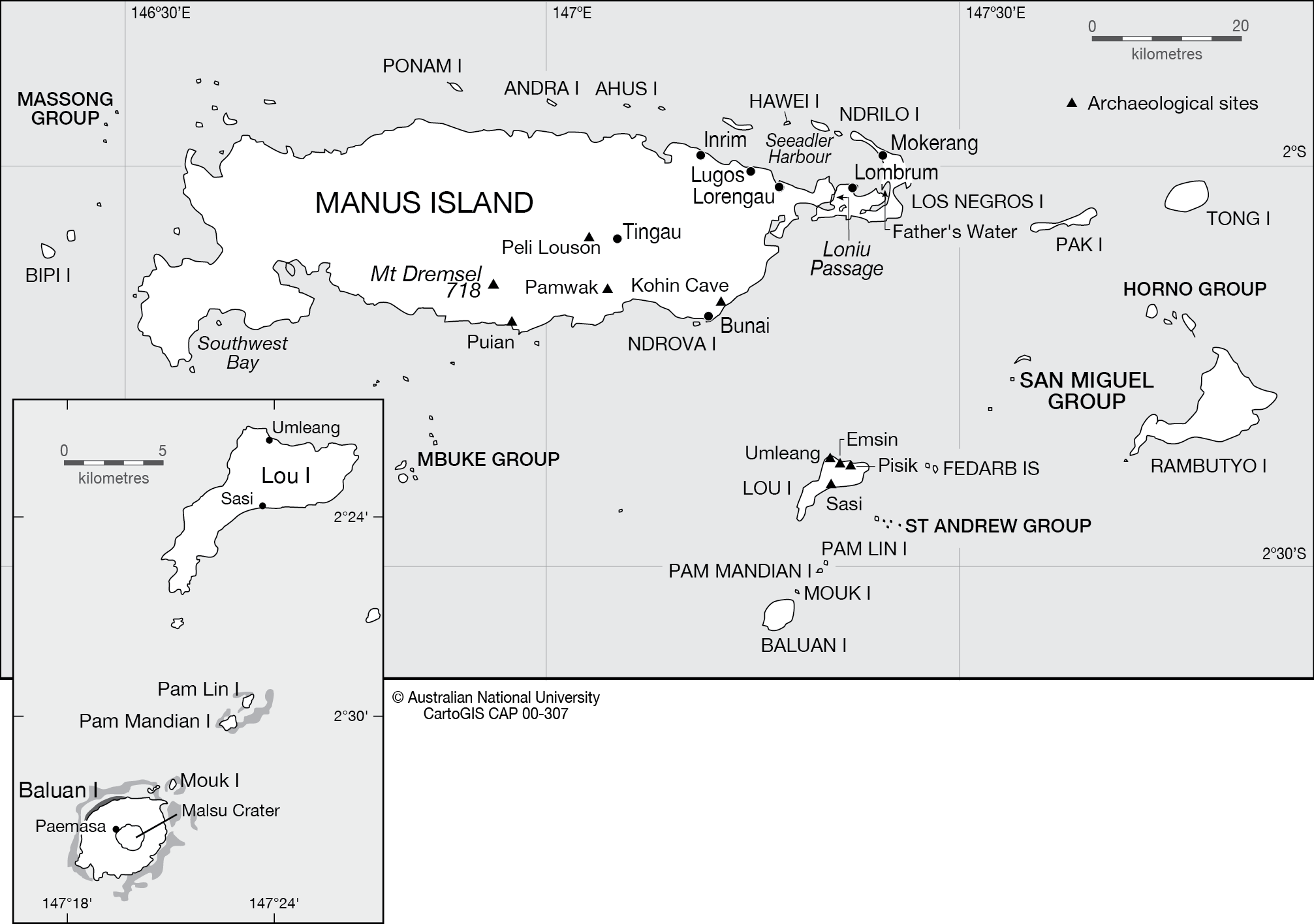
- Location of Lou Island within the Admiralty Islands

Geography
- Coordinates: 2°24′S 147°21′E
- Archipelago: Admiralty Islands, Bismarck Archipelago
- Highest elevation: 764 ft (232.9 m)

Administration
- Papua New Guinea
- Province: Manus Province
- District: Manus District
- Local-level Government: Balopa Rural LLG

Demographics
- Population: 1,142 (2026)

Lou Island is an island of the Admiralty Islands, part of the Bismarck Archipelago, located in northern Papua New Guinea.

Lou Island has four main villages: Rei, Lako, Baon and Solang.

The local Lou language belongs to the Admiralty Islands languages, an aubgroup of the Austronesian language family.
