= St George linkage =

Linkage of Meso-Melanesian languages

- Geographic distribution: Papua New Guinea, Solomon Islands
- Linguistic classification: Austronesian: Malayo-Polynesian; Oceanic; Western Oceanic; Meso-Melanesian; St George linkage

Language codes
- ISO 639-3: –
- Glottolog: meso1253

The St. George linkage links the North-West Solomonic and New Ireland languages under the Meso-Melanesian languages. Members of the St George linkage are Niwer Mil language, Warwar Feni, Fanamaket, Sursurunga, Konomala, Patpatar, Tolai, Kandas, Ramoaina, Lungalunga, Label, Bilur, and Siar.
