= Kuot language =

Language isolate of Papua New Guinea

Kuot
- Panaris
- Native to: Papua New Guinea
- Region: New Ireland (10 villages)
- Native speakers: 1,500 (2002)
- Language family: Language isolate
- Writing system: Latin

Language codes
- ISO 639-3: kto
- Glottolog: kuot1243
- ELP: Kuot
- Kuot is classified as Vulnerable by the UNESCO Atlas of the World's Languages in Danger.

- Coordinates: 3.122883°S 151.485644°E

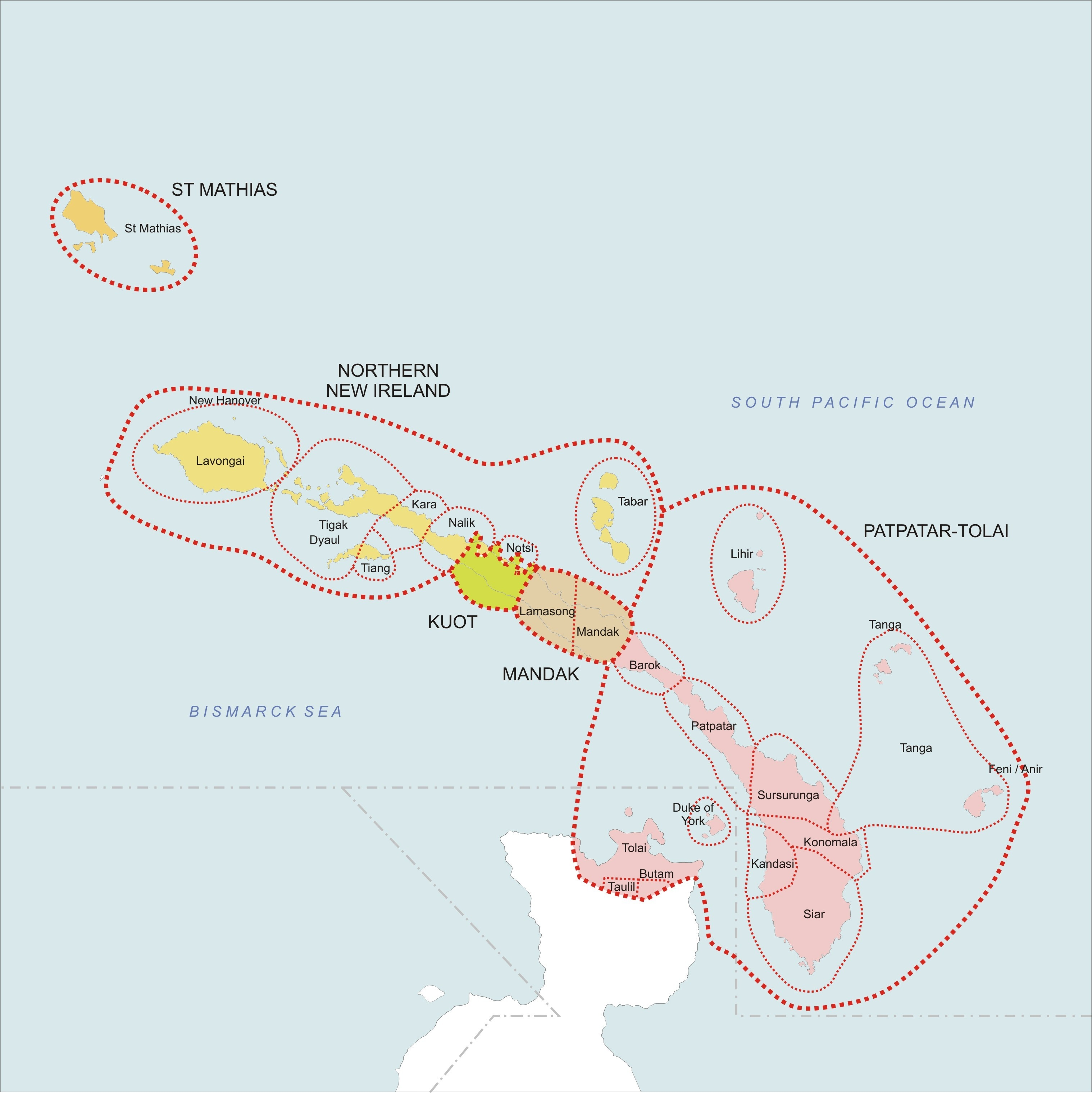
Languages of New Ireland

The Kuot language, or Panaras, is a language isolate, the only non-Austronesian language spoken on the island of New Ireland, Papua New Guinea. Lindström (2002: 30) estimates that there are 1,500 fluent speakers of Kuot. Perhaps due to the small speaker base, there are no significant dialects present within Kuot. It is spoken in 10 villages, including Panaras village (3.122883°S 151.485644°E) of Sentral Niu Ailan Rural LLG in New Ireland Province.

== Locations ==
Kuot is spoken in the following 10 villages. The first five villages are located on the eastern coast, and the last five on the western coast in New Ireland. Geographical coordinates are also provided for each village.

- Kama (2.977267°S 151.501072°E)
- Bol (2.996383°S 151.537008°E) (mixed with Nalik speakers)
- Fanafiliuo
- Liedan (3.021238°S 151.585456°E)
- Kabi (3.067025°S 151.680387°E)
- Naiama (3.063228°S 151.434449°E)
- Panaras (3.122883°S 151.485644°E)
- Naliut (3.14398°S 151.547271°E)
- Nakalakalap (3.14398°S 151.547271°E)
- Patlangat (3.159597°S 151.591463°E)
- Bimun (3.167725°S 151.604444°E)

Combined, the two villages of Naliut and Nakalakalap are known as Neiruaran (3.14398°S 151.547271°E). Most of the villages are located in Sentral Niu Ailan Rural LLG, though some of the eastern villages, such as Kama and Bol, are located in Tikana Rural LLG.

The Kuot variety described by Lindström (2002) is that of Bimun village.

== Language contact ==
Lenition in some Austronesian languages of New Ireland, namely Lamasong, Madak, Barok, Nalik, and Kara, may have diffused via influence from Kuot (Ross 1994: 566).

== Status ==
Kuot is an endangered language and most children, if not all, grow up speaking Tok Pisin instead.

== Phonology ==
=== Consonants ===
The following table contains Kuot's consonants:

		Bilabial	Alveolar	Velar
Nasal		m	n~ɲ	ŋ
Plosive	voiceless	p	t	k
Plosive	voiced	b	d	ɡ
Fricative	voiceless	ɸ~f	s~ʃ	
Fricative	voiced	β~v		
Lateral			l	
Flap			ɾ	

=== Vowels ===
The vowels /i/ and /u/ tend to become glide-vowels in occurrence with other vowels. The length of the vowels is not making differences for the meaning of words. The appearance of /i/ and /u/ with other vowels can not be seen as diphthong or a combination of vowel and glide-vowel. There are never more than three vowels per syllable. The combination of diphthong and vowel is also possible but they are pronounced in conditions of the syllable. Diphthongs are spoken like one sound.

The following table contains Kuot's vowels:

	Front	Back
Close	i	u
Mid	e	o
Open	a	

Phoneme	Allophones
/i/	[i~ɪ~j]
/e/	[e~ɛ]
/a/	[a~ʌ]
/u/	[u~ʊ~w]
/o/	[o~ɔ]

=== Morphophonemic alternations ===
==== 't' to 'r' alternation ====
The phoneme /t/ in certain possessive markers, such as "-tuaŋ", "-tuŋ" and "-tuo" becomes /r/ when it comes after a stem ending in a vowel. Compare:

- ira-ruaŋ – my father
- luguan-tuaŋ – my house
- i'rama-ruo – my eye
- nebam-tuaŋ – my feather

==== Vowel shortening ====
Where the third person singular masculine suffix "-oŋ" is used on a noun that ends with a vowel, this vowel is typically not pronounced. For instance, "amaŋa-oŋ" is pronounced [aˈmaŋɔŋ], not [aˈmaŋaɔŋ].

==== Voicing rule ====
When vowel-initial suffixes are added to stems that end in voiceless consonants, those consonants become voiced. For example:

- /obareit-oŋ/ [obaˈreidoŋ] he splits it
- /taɸ-o/ [taˈβo] he drinks
- /marik-oŋ/ [maˈriɡoŋ] he prays

The phoneme /p/ becomes [β], not [b].

- /sip-oŋ/ [ˈsiβɔŋ] it comes out
- /irap-a/ [iˈraβa] her eyes

== Grammar ==
Kuot is the only Papuan language that has VSO word order.

The morphology of the language is primarily agglutinative. There are two grammatical genders, male and female, and distinction is made in the first person between singular, dual, and plural, as well as between exclusive and inclusive.

For instance, the sentence parak-oŋ ira-ruaŋ kamin literally means 'my father eats sweet potato'. Parak-oŋ is a continuous aspect of the verb meaning 'to eat', ira means 'father', -ruaŋ is a suffix used to indicate inalienable possession ('my father'), and kamin is a simple noun meaning 'sweet potato'.

=== Noun declensions ===
Kuot nouns can be singular, dual, or plural. Below are some noun declension paradigms in Kuot (from Stebbins, et al. (2018), based on Lindström 2002: 147–146):

Class	Noun root	Gloss	Singular	Plural	Dual
1	‘plain’	road	alaŋ	alaŋip	alaŋip-ien
2	ma	eye	irəma	irəp	irəp-ien
3	na	base (e.g. of tree)	muana	muap	muap-ien
4	bun	hen	puraibun	purailəp	purailəp-ien
5	bu	breadfruit tree	opəliobu	opələp	opələp-ien
6	uom	banana	pebuom	pebup	pebup-ien
7	bam	rib	binbam	binbəp	binbəp-ien
8	nəm	village	pianəm	pialap	pialap-ien
9	nim	name	bonim	bop	bop-ien
10	m	nit	dikkam	dikkəp	dikkəp-ien
11	n	weed	kaun	kaulup	kaulup-ien

== Vocabulary ==
The following basic vocabulary words are from Lindström (2008), as cited in the Trans-New Guinea database:

gloss	Kuot
head	bukom
hair	kapuruma
ear	kikinəm
eye	irəma
nose	akabunima; ŋof
tooth	laukima
tongue	məlobiem
louse	ineima
dog	kapuna
bird	amani; kobeŋ
egg	dəkər; səgər
blood	oləbuan
bone	muanəm
skin	kumalip; neip; pəppək
breast	sisima
man	mikana; teima
woman	makabun
sky	panbinim
moon	uləŋ
water	burunəm; danuot
fire	kit
stone	adəs
road, path	alaŋ
name	bonim
eat	o; parak
one	namurit
two	narain

== See also ==
- East Papuan languages
