= Tikana Rural LLG =

Local-level government in Papua New Guinea

- Location of Tikana Rural LLG in Kavieng District of New Ireland Province in Papua New Guinea
- Country: Papua New Guinea
- Province: New Ireland Province
- Time zone: UTC+10 (AEST)

District map of New Ireland Province

Tikana Rural LLG is a local government area in New Ireland Province, Papua New Guinea. The LLG administers the northern section of the island of New Ireland, as well as Djaul Island and some Tigak islands in the strait between New Ireland and New Hanover.

The LLG is located in Kavieng District and the LLG headquarters is Kavieng, although Kavieng has its own urban LLG.

Tikana is a portmanteau word derived from the names of the three language areas that make up the LLG: Tigak, Kara and Nalik. Population is 33,222 (PNG Census 2011).

The Kuot language is spoken in the southern part of the LLG.

The LLG president is Ken Bart.

== Wards ==
- 01. Enang
- 02. Nonovaul
- 03. Panapai
- 04. Kaselok
- 05. Bagatare
- 06. Lokono
- 07. Ngavalus
- 08. Paruai
- 09. Lemakot
- 10. Panamana
- 11. Madina
- 12. Kafkaf (Kuot language speakers)
- 13. Namasalang
- 14. Belifu
- 15. Pangeifua
- 16. Lamusmus
- 17. Leon
- 18. Lapai
- 83. Lakurumau Estate
