= Dyaul Island =

Island in Papua New Guinea

Coordinates: 2°56′S 150°53′E

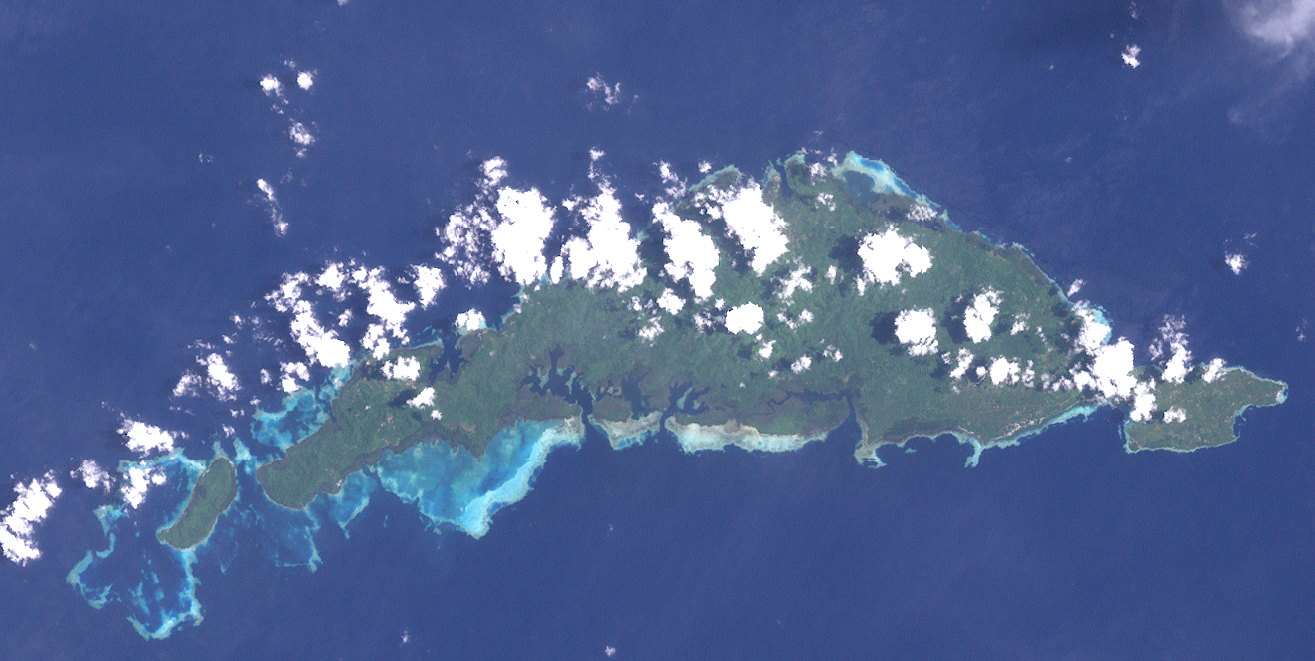
Satellite image of Dyaul Island

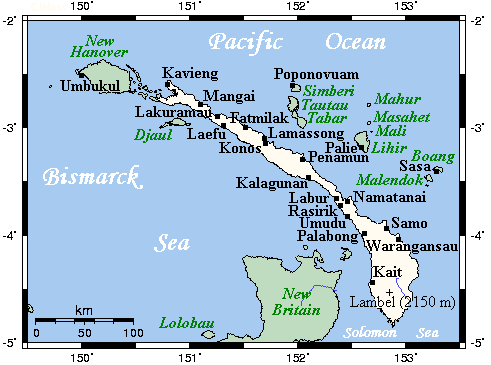
Location of Dyaul Island in New Ireland Province

Dyaul Island (also Djaul and occasionally still referred to as Sandwich Island) is an island in the Kavieng District of New Ireland Province, Papua New Guinea (PNG). Its area is 100 km^{2} (39 sq mi). It is part of the Tikana Rural LLG local government area of PNG. There are two languages spoken on Dyaul, not counting the lingua franca, Tok Pisin; Tigak and Tiang. Tigak is widely spoken on the western end of the island in two villages. Tiang is spoken across the remainder of the island.

== Meteorite fall ==
The Dyarrl Island meteorite fell on Dyaul in January 1933. As of 2014 it was the fourth of only seven observed mesosiderite falls, but by far the smallest. It is the most silicate rich of all mesosiderite falls and presents an interesting mix of mineralogical diversity. The main mass is held in Sydney at the Australian Museum.

== Natural history ==
The island has many species of bird and several new species have been identified there, notably by Finn Salomonsen.

== Economy ==
The inhabitants live mainly in seven villages, and frequently visit Kavieng, the capital of the province, for supplies or to sell produce and fish. In addition to this trade and subsistence agriculture, there are several plantations on the island.

== World War II ==
In April 1943, during the Second World War it was reported by an Allied spotter plane that Japanese forces had established a landing strip on the island, as part of the preparations for a possible invasion of Australia.

== In popular culture ==
The singer, Awis Taule, issued a song called Djaul Island (Dyaul) in 2021. The video clip features photos and film of the island.
