= Djaul =

Djaul may refer to:

- Dyaul Island in the New Ireland chain of Papua New Guinea
- Tiang language also known as the Djaul language and spoken on Dyaul Island
