= Nalik =

Nalik can refer to:

- The Nalik language of New Ireland, Papua New Guinea
- Nalik culture - the traditional culture of the Nalik language area
