= VMG (disambiguation) =

VMG may refer to:

- Velocity made good, the speed of a sailboat towards (or from) the direction of the wind
- Voice Media Group, an American privately held media company
- vmg, the ISO 639-3 code for Lungalunga language
- Virgin Music Group, a global record label
- .vmg, the filename extension for vMessage
