= BJK (disambiguation) =

BJK or Beşiktaş J.K. is a Turkish sports club.

BJK or bjk may also refer to:

- Benjina-Nangasuri Airport, Maluku, Indonesia (IATA code: BJK)
- Barok language of New Ireland, PNG (ISO code: bjk)
- Big Jock Knew, Scottish football chant
- Billie Jean King, American tennis player
  - USTA Billie Jean King National Tennis Center
