= Notsi =

Notsi may be,

- Notsi language, New Ireland
- Leslie Notši
