= Gazellah Bruder =

Papua New Guinean artist

- Born: 1977 (age 48–49); Port Moresby, Papua New Guinea
- Other names: Gazellah Bruder Sione
- Occupation: Artist

Gazellah Bruder is one of Papua New Guinea's (PNG) most prominent women artists. Her art, largely involving printmaking, focuses on gender, social, and sexual issues that continue to marginalise Papua New Guinean women, as well as on environmental topics. Her work has been exhibited at more than 50 exhibitions.

== Early life ==
Gazellah Bruder was born in Port Moresby in 1977. Her father, to whom she was very close, was a Tolai from the East New Britain province of Papua New Guinea. She is a graduate of the University of Papua New Guinea with both a Diploma in Fine Art and Bachelor of Art in Art and Design. Later, in 2012, she obtained an Honours Degree in Visual Anthropology.

== Career ==
Bruder developed a unique painting style early in her career. It is considered to differ from those of other PNG artists, because she rarely uses traditional PNG motifs, patterns, and objects. Her work has addressed what it means to be a woman in today's PNG from the perspectives of oppression, violence, and inequality. Women's bodies frequently appear in her paintings and fabric prints from woodcuts, with women often represented as pregnant. She sees in the body changed by pregnancy and childbirth proof of the emergence of a beautiful self-confident woman. Consistently her theme is female identity and her reflection on her own life as a single mother. More recently she has covered the topic of ocean pollution, and the destruction of forests. She often accompanies her art with poems on the same subject, in which the role of humanity in causing destruction is stressed.

Bruder has exhibited at more than 50 exhibitions nationally in PNG as well as internationally, particularly in Australia, the United Kingdom and Germany. In addition to producing works of art she has worked for the private sector. In 1999, she appeared on television in children's programmes and she has illustrated two children's books. Her work was featured in the 2006 publication, "Papua New Guinea Prints", published by the National Gallery of Australia.

In 2018, while working as a creative director for an art gallery, she won a competition to design a sculpture for Port Moresby, funded by the Australian government. This was her first sculpture and consisted of a steel structure entitled Happy Family, Happy Nation. In 2020, she was one of five women from Papua New Guinea chosen by the United Nations to produce advocacy materials aimed at responding to violence against women in the country.

== Publications illustrated ==
- 2011. Donkey from Town. Andrew V. Solien, illustrated by Gazellah Bruder. University of Papua New Guinea Press
- 2011. Edward Goes Fishing. Andrew V. Solien, illustrated by Gazellah Bruder. University of Papua New Guinea Press
