= Lungalunga language =

Austronesian language

Lungalunga
- Minigir
- Vinitiri
- Native to: Papua New Guinea
- Region: Gazelle Peninsula, East New Britain Province
- Ethnicity: 6,000 (2012)
- Native speakers: 6,000 (2012)
- Language family: Austronesian: Malayo-Polynesian; Oceanic; Western; Meso-Melanesian; (St George linkage); Patpatar–Tolai; Lungalunga

Language codes
- ISO 639-3: vmg
- Glottolog: mini1251

Lungalunga (Lunga Lunga), frequently though ambiguously called Minigir, is spoken by a small number of the Tolai people of Papua New Guinea, who live on the Gazelle Peninsula in East New Britain Province. It is often referred to in the linguistics literature as the Tolai "dialect" with an /s/.

== Classification ==
Lungalunga belongs to the Oceanic branch of the Austronesian language family. The most immediate subgroup is the Patpatar–Tolai group of languages which also includes Kuanua (also spoken on the Gazelle Peninsula) and Patpatar (spoken on New Ireland).

A "Tolai-Nakanai trade language" reported in the literature was apparently not a pidgin as assumed, but Minigir (Lungalunga) with perhaps some Meramera or Nakanai mixed in.

== Geographic distribution ==
Lungalunga is spoken on Ataliklikun Bay, in the villages of Lungalunga, Kabaira and Vunamarita, located on the Gazelle Peninsula in the East New Britain Province of Papua New Guinea.

== Grammar ==
=== Independent pronouns ===
Lungalunga pronouns have four number distinctions (singular, dual, trial and plural) and three person distinctions (first, second and third) as well as an inclusive and exclusive distinction. There are no gender distinctions.

	Singular	Dual	Trial	Plural
1st exclusive	iau (I)	iamiru (he/she and I)	iamitalu (both of them, and I)	iamamami (all of them, and I)
1st inclusive	-	iadori (thou and I)	iadatalu (both of you, and I)	iada (all of you, and I)
2nd	iavau (thou)	iamuru (you two)	iamutalu (you three)	iamui (you guys)
3rd	ia (he/she)	idiru (they two)	iditalu (they three)	idi (they)

=== Syntax ===
The usual word order of Lungalunga is subject–verb–object (SVO).
