= GRZ =

GRZ may refer to:

- Gold Reserve (company), an American gold mining company
- Graz Airport, in Austria
- Guramalum language
