= TQP =

TQP or tqp may refer to:

- TQP, the IATA code for Trepell Airport, Queensland, Australia
- tqp, the ISO 639-3 code for Tomoip language, New Britain, Papua New Guinea
