= BJL =

BJL or bjl may refer to:

- Bangladesh Jatiya League, a dissolved political party in Bangladesh
- Brynmor Jones Library, the main library at the University of Hull
- BJL, the IATA code for Banjul International Airport, the Gambia
- bjl, the ISO 639-3 code for Bulu language (Oceanic), Papua New Guinea
