= Notsi language =

Language

Notsi
- Region: New Ireland
- Native speakers: 3,500 (2023 Estimate Joshua Project)
- Language family: Austronesian: Malayo-Polynesian; Oceanic; Western; Meso-Melanesian; (New Ireland); Tabar; Notsi

Language codes
- ISO 639-3: ncf
- Glottolog: nots1237

Notsi is an Austronesian language spoken in seven villages along the east coast of New Ireland, Papua New Guinea about midway between Kavieng and Namatanai. The Nalik language is the neighboring language to the north and is interspersed among Kuot language villages.
