= Bola language =

Bola language may refer to:

- Bola language (Austronesian)
- the Chinese rendering of the Pela language
