= Tiang language =

Oceanic language spoken in Papua New Guinea

Tiang
- Native to: Papua New Guinea
- Native speakers: (790 cited 1972)
- Language family: Austronesian: Malayo-Polynesian; Oceanic; Western; Meso-Melanesian; (New Ireland); Tungag–Nalik; Tiang

Language codes
- ISO 639-3: tbj
- Glottolog: tian1237

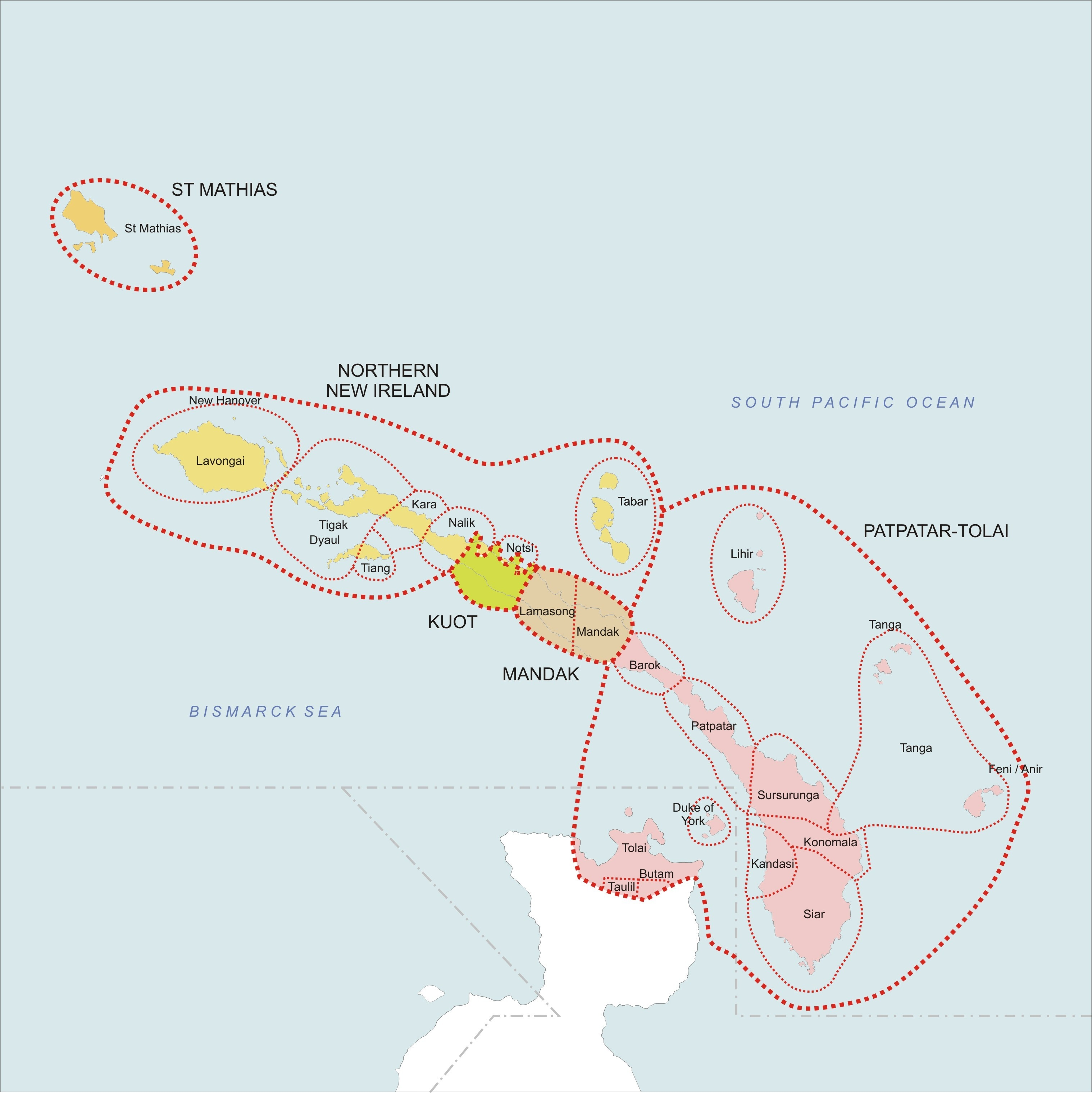
Languages of the New Ireland languages group

The Tiang language, also known as Djaul, is a language spoken in Papua New Guinea.

== Overview ==
It is spoken on Dyaul Island and in 1972 there were 790 speakers reported by Beaumont. On that island Tigak and Tok Pisin are also spoken. Tigak is predominant on the northern half of the island and Tiang on the southern half. The former may be related closely to Tiang. It is also spoken on some other nearby areas in New Ireland Province. The language has a subject–verb–object structure order. The people that speak this language are swidden agriculturalists. There had been very little data available for this language, before a reference grammar was published.
