= Dang language =

Dang may be :

- Dang Tharu language
- Sedang language
- Tungag language
- Kedang language
