= Laxudumau language =

Austronesian language

Laxudumau
- Lakurumau
- Region: New Ireland Province, Papua New Guinea
- Native speakers: 800 (2020)
- Language family: Austronesian: Malayo-Polynesian; Oceanic; Western; Meso-Melanesian; (New Ireland); Tungag–Nalik; Laxudumau

Language codes
- ISO 639-3: lxm
- Glottolog: laku1238
- ELP: Lakurumau
- Laxudumau is classified as Vulnerable by the UNESCO Atlas of the World's Languages in Danger.

- Coordinates: 2.883°S 151.250°E

Laxudumau (Lakurumau), spoken in the village of Lakurumau on the island of New Ireland, is an Austronesian language transitional between Nalik and Kara.
