= Duk-Duk =

Tolai secret society from Papua New Guinea

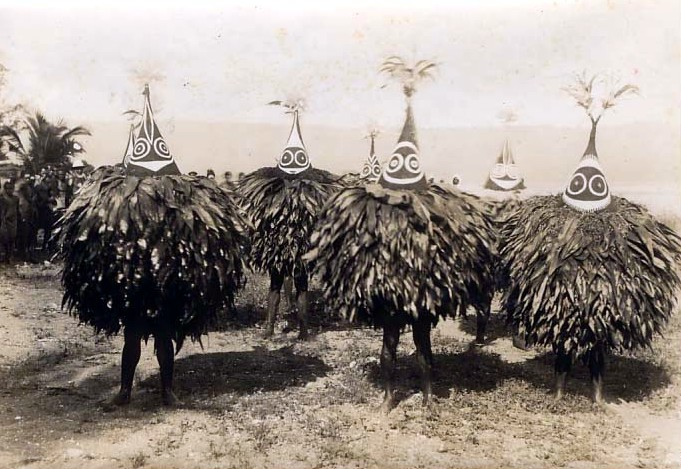
Duk-Duk dancers in the Gazelle Peninsula, New Britain, 1913

Duk-Duk is a secret society, part of the traditional culture of the Tolai people of the Rabaul area of New Britain, the largest island in the Bismarck Archipelago of Papua New Guinea, in the South Pacific.

== Description ==
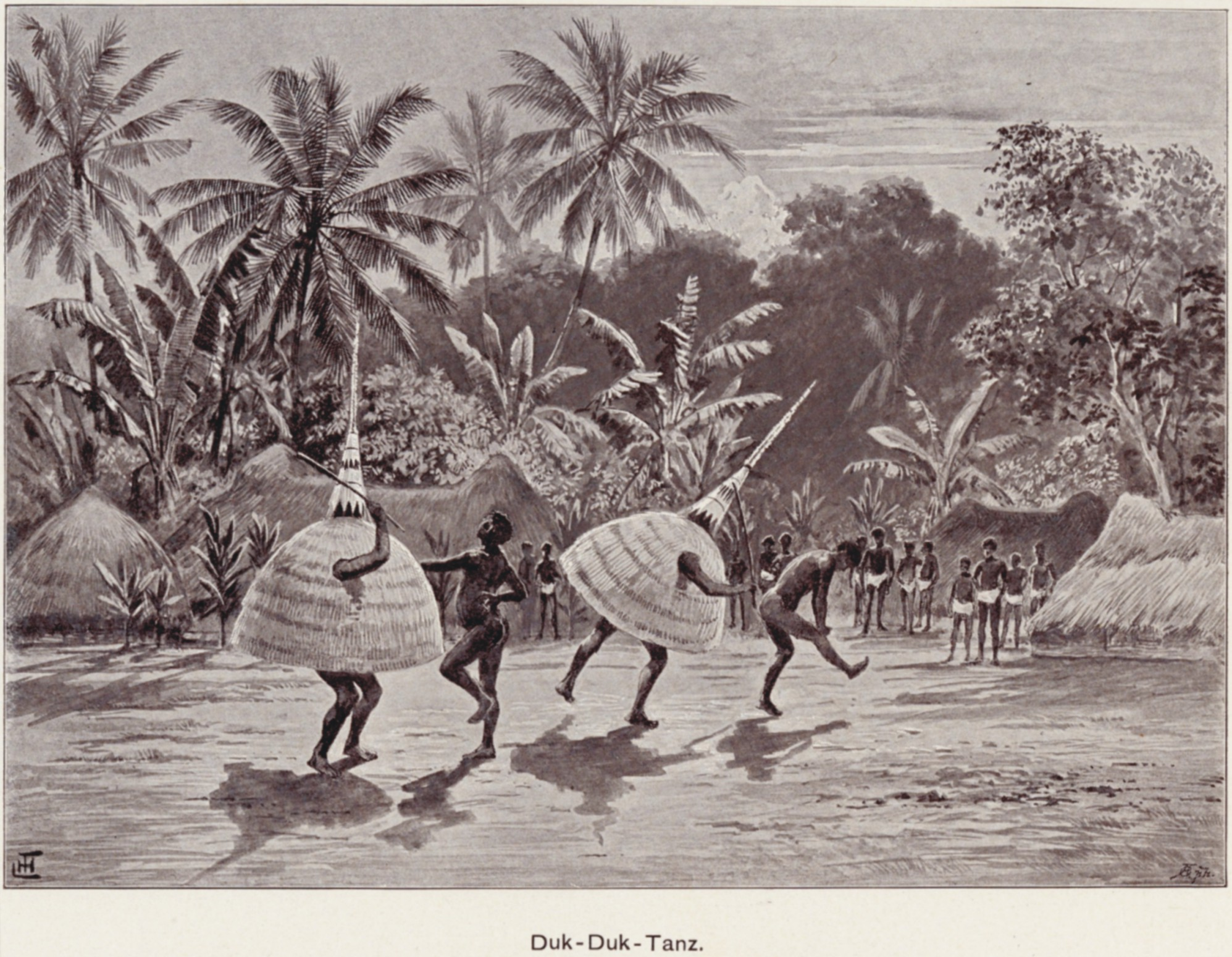
Painting of a Duk-Duk dance by Joachim von Pfeil, published 1899

The society has religious and political as well as social objectives. It represents a form of law and order through its presiding spirits. In ritual dances, members of the society invoke the male spirit duk duk and female spirit tubuan depending on which mask the dancer wears. The dancers are always male despite the fact that some are performing the role of female spirits. Women and children were forbidden to look at these figures. Both types of mask are cone-shaped and are constructed of cane and fibre, with short, bushy capes of leaves. Traditionally the duk duk was taller than the tubuan and was faceless. The tubuan had circular eyes and a crescent-shaped mouth painted on a dark background. In addition to the mask, leaves cover the torso of the dancers so that only their legs are visible.

Only males could belong to Duk-Duk, with an entrance fee (in dewarra, small cowry shells strung on strips of cane, often 100 metres or more).

The society has its secret signs and rituals, and festivals which were in past times closed to strangers on pain of death. Duk-Duk only appeared with the full moon.

Justice was executed, fines extorted, taboos, feasts, taxes and all tribal matters arranged by the Duk-Duk members, wearing masks or chalk on their faces. In carrying out punishments, they were allowed to burn houses and even kill people. Dancers wearing the tubuan masks were regarded as divine beings whose judgment and actions could not be questioned.

The society's practice has been dying out since around the start of the 20th century, but Duk-Duk dancers are now featured as tourist attraction.

== Sources and references ==
- Duk-Duk and other Customs or Forms of Expression of the Melanesians Intellectual Life, by Graf von Pfeil in "Journal of Anthropology"
- H. Romilly, The Western Pacific and New Guinea (London, 1886)pp 27–33
