= Tolai language =

Spoken by the Tolai people of Papua New Guinea

Tolai
- Kuanua
- Tinata Tuna
- Native to: Papua New Guinea
- Region: Gazelle Peninsula, East New Britain Province
- Ethnicity: Tolai
- Native speakers: (61,000 cited 1991); 20,000 L2 speakers
- Language family: Austronesian: Malayo-Polynesian; Oceanic; Western; Meso-Melanesian; (St George linkage); Patpatar–Tolai; Tolai
- Writing system: Latin script (Tolai alphabet); Tolai Braille

Language codes
- ISO 639-3: ksd
- Glottolog: kuan1248

The Tolai language, or Kuanua, is spoken by the Tolai people of Papua New Guinea, who live on the Gazelle Peninsula in East New Britain Province.

== Nomenclature ==
This language is often referred to in the literature as Tolai. However, Tolai is actually the name of the cultural group. The Tolais themselves refer to their language as a tinata tuna, which translates as 'the real language'. Kuanua is apparently a word in Ramoaaina meaning 'the place over there'.

== Classification ==
Tolai belongs to the Oceanic branch of the Austronesian language family. The most immediate subgroup is the Patpatar–Tolai group of languages which also includes Lungalunga (also spoken on the Gazelle Peninsula) and Patpatar (spoken on New Ireland).

== Characteristics ==
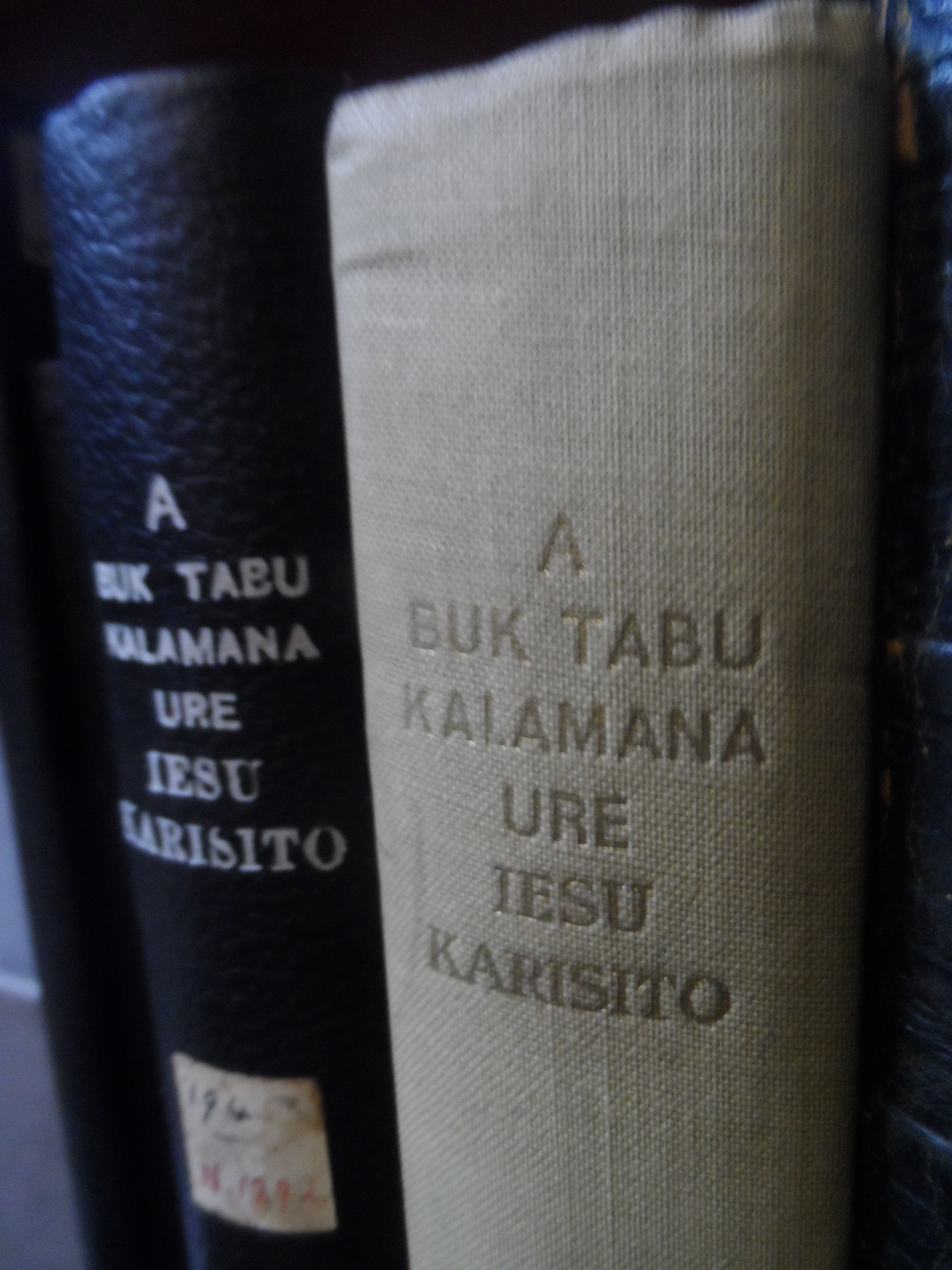
New Testaments in Tolai: A Buk Tabu Kalamana Ure Iesu Karisito: "The New Holy Book about Jesus Christ"

Unlike many languages in Papua New Guinea, Tolai is a healthy language and not in danger of dying out to Tok Pisin, though Tolai has many loanwords from Tok Pisin; e.g. the original kubar has been completely usurped by the Tok Pisin braun for 'brown', and the Tok Pisin vilivil for 'bicycle' has replaced the former aingau. It is considered a prestigious language and is the primary language of communication in the two major centers of East New Britain: Kokopo and Rabaul.

Tolai lost the phoneme /s/. For instance, the word for 'sun' in closely related languages of South New Ireland is kesakese, and this has been reduced to keake in Tolai. However, /s/ has been reintroduced through numerous loanwords from English and Tok Pisin.

== Geographic distribution ==
Tolai is spoken on the Gazelle Peninsula in the East New Britain Province of Papua New Guinea.

=== Derived languages ===
Tolai is said to be one of the major substratum languages of Tok Pisin. Some common Tok Pisin vocabulary items that likely come from Tolai (or a closely related language) include:

aibika (from ibika) – Hibiscus manihot
buai – 'betelnut'
diwai (from dawai) – 'tree, wood'
guria – 'earthquake'
kawawar (from kavavar) – 'ginger'
kiau – 'egg'
lapun – 'elderly person'
liklik (from ikilik) – 'small'
umben (from uben) – 'fishing net'

== Phonology ==
Phonology of the Tolai language:

Consonant sounds
		Labial	Alveolar	Velar
Nasal		m	n	ŋ
Plosive	voiceless	p	t	k
Plosive	voiced	b	d	ɡ
Fricative		β	s	
Liquid	rhotic		r	
Liquid	Lateral		l	
Semivowel		(w)		

Vowel sounds
	Front	Central	Back
High	i		u
Mid	e		o
Low		a	

Vowel sounds can also be realised as [ɪ, ɛ, ʌ, ɔ, ʊ]. /i/ can be pronounced as [j] in word-initial position.

== Grammar ==
=== Independent pronouns ===
Tolai pronouns have four number distinctions (singular, dual, trial and plural) and three person distinctions (first person, second person and third person) as well as an inclusive/exclusive distinction. There are no gender distinctions.

		Singular	Dual	Trial	Plural
1st	exclusive	iau (I)	(a)mir (he/she and I)	(a)mital (both of them, and I)	avet (all of them, and I)
1st	inclusive	-	dor (thou and I)	datal (both of you, and I)	dat (all of you, and I)
2nd		u (thou)	(a)mur (you two)	(a)mutal (you three)	avat (you guys)
3rd		ia (he/she)	dir (they two)	dital (they three)	diat (they)

The plural pronouns lose their final -t when used before a verb.

- Da vana! – 'Let's go!'
- Pa ave gire. – 'We didn't see.'
- Dia tar pot – 'They have already arrived.'

=== Syntax ===
The usual word order of Tolai is agent–verb–object (AVO/SVO).

=== Morphology ===
There is an irregular pattern involving the prefix ni-, which changes a verb to a noun. Ordinarily, the prefix is added to the verb, as in laun 'to live' → a nilaun 'the life', ian 'to eat' → a nian 'the food', aring 'to pray' → a niaring 'the prayer'. However, in some cases it becomes an infix ⟨in⟩: varubu 'to fight' → a vinarubu 'the fight', tata 'to talk' → a tinata 'the language', mamai 'to chew betelnut' → a minamai '(a small supply of) betelnuts for chewing'. This infix is inserted after the initial phoneme of the verb. It could also be described as the prefix ni- being added as a prefix, and the initial phoneme of the verb changing places with the n of the prefix.
