= Meramera language =

Austronesian language

Meramera
- Melamela
- Native to: Papua New Guinea
- Native speakers: (2,000 cited 1995)
- Language family: Austronesian: Malayo-Polynesian; Oceanic; Western; Meso-Melanesian; Willaumez; Meramera

Language codes
- ISO 639-3: mxm
- Glottolog: mera1242

Meramera (Melamela) is an Austronesian language of New Britain in Papua New Guinea.

== Name ==
The name Meramera comes from the closely related Nakanai language in the Bileki dialect. In Meramera, the language is referred to as Melamela, literally meaning 'talk'.
