= Meso-Melanesian languages =

Subgroup in the Oceanic family of languages

Meso-Melanesian
- Geographic distribution: Papua New Guinea, Solomon Islands
- Linguistic classification: Austronesian: Malayo-Polynesian; Oceanic; Western Oceanic; Meso-Melanesian
- Proto-language: Proto-Meso-Melanesian

Language codes
- ISO 639-3: –
- Glottolog: meso1253

The Meso-Melanesian languages are a linkage of Oceanic languages spoken in the large Melanesian islands of New Ireland and the Solomon Islands east of New Guinea. Bali is one of the most conservative languages.

== Composition ==
The languages group as follows:

- Willaumez linkage: Bola, Bulu, Meramera, Nakanai
- Bali–Vitu: Bali (Uneapa), Vitu (Muduapa) [may be a single language]
- New Ireland – Northwest Solomonic linkage

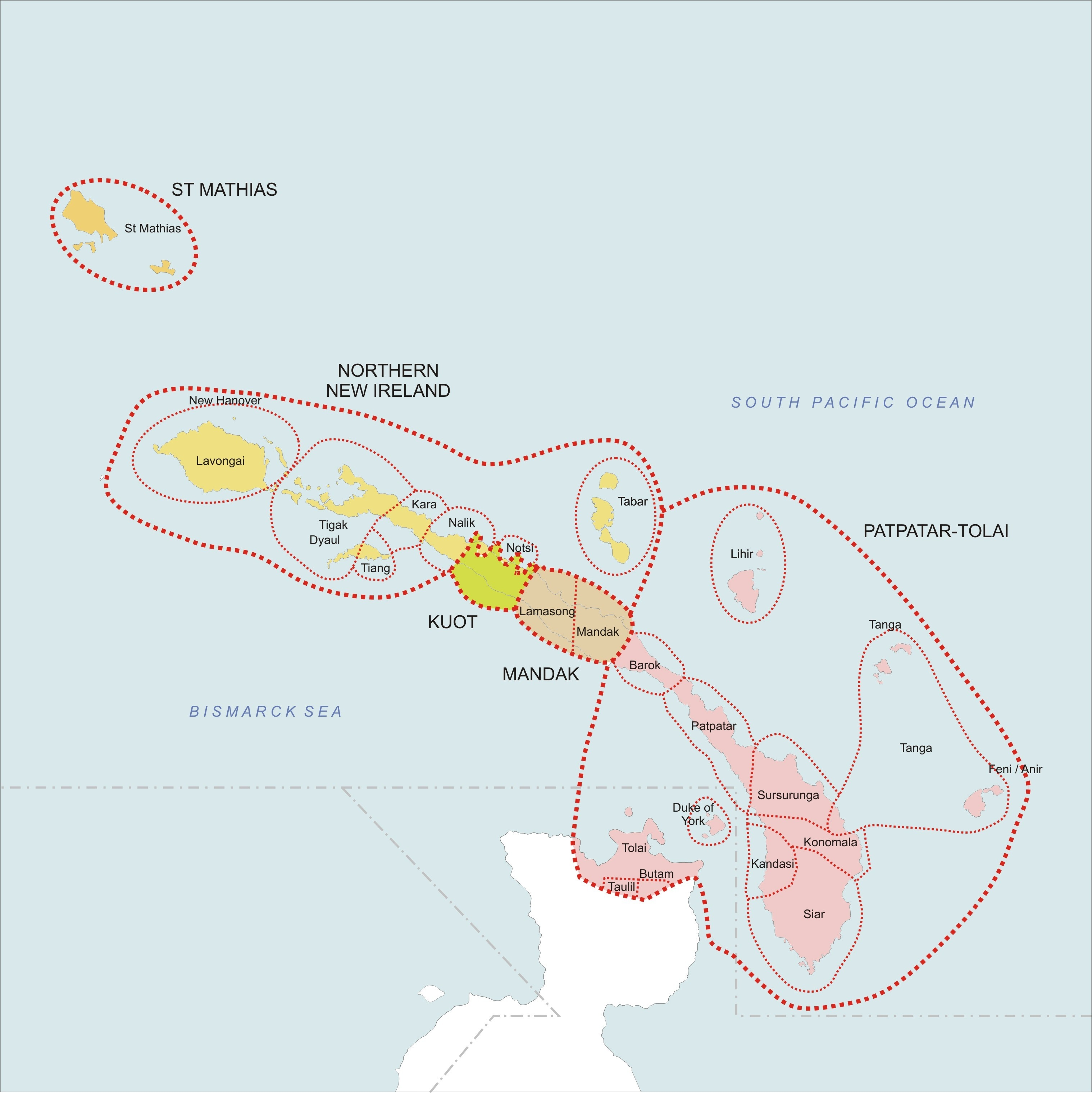
The languages of New Ireland are part of the Meso-Melanesian linkage.

  - Tungag–Nalik family: Tigak, Tungag, Nalik, Laxudumau, Kara, Tiang
  - Tabar linkage: Madara (Tabar), Lihir, Notsi
  - Madak linkage: Barok, Lavatbura-Lamusong, Madak
  - Tomoip
  - St George linkage
    - Niwer Mil
    - Warwar Feni
    - Fanamaket
    - Sursurunga
    - Konomala
    - Patpatar–Tolai: Patpatar, Lungalunga (Minigir), Tolai (Kuanua)
    - Label–Bilur: Label, Bilur
    - Kandas–Ramoaaina: Kandas, Ramoaaina
    - Siar
    - Northwest Solomonic linkage

Ethnologue adds Guramalum to the St George linkage.

The Willaumez Peninsula on the north coast of New Britain was evidently the center of dispersal.

Johnston (1982) combines the Willaumez and Bali–Vitu branches into a single Kimbe branch, for which he reconstructs Proto-Kimbe.

== Language contact ==
Lenition in Lamasong, Madak, Barok, Nalik, and Kara may have diffused via influence from Kuot, the only non-Austronesian language spoken on New Ireland (Ross 1994: 566).
