= Sursurunga language =

Oceanic language

Sursurunga
- Region: New Ireland
- Native speakers: (3,000 cited 1991)
- Language family: Austronesian: Malayo-Polynesian; Oceanic; Western; Meso-Melanesian; (St George linkage); Sursurunga

Language codes
- ISO 639-3: sgz
- Glottolog: surs1246

Sursurunga is an Oceanic language of New Ireland.

== Phonology ==
=== Consonants ===
Consonants
		Bilabial	Dental	Alveolar	Palatal	Velar	Glottal
Plosive	voiceless	p	t̪			k	
Plosive	voiced	b		d		g	
Fricative				s			h
Nasal		m		n		ŋ	
Trill				r			
Approximant		w		l	j		

- /p/ has two allophones: [pʷ] syllable initially and [p̚] syllable finally.
- /t̪/ has two allophones: [t̪] syllable initially and [t̪]~[t̪͆] syllable finally.
- /k/ has two allophones: [k] syllable initially and [k]~[k̚]~[kʰ] syllable finally.
- Voiced stops /b/ [bʷ], /d/, and /g/ only occur syllable initially. Plain and prenasalized voiced stops (i.e., [ᵐbʷ], [ⁿd], [ᵑg]) are in free variation word initially. Voiced stops are nasalized word-medially between vowels and after non-nasal consonants. [ɖ], a "voiced alveolar slightly retroflexed stop" is also heard word medially.
- /s/ is [s] syllable initially and finally.
- /h/ is a "voiceless vocoid occurring word finally following a voiced vocoid of the same quality."
- /m/ is [mʷ] syllable initially and [m] syllable finally. It becomes [mʷ] after a rounded vowel.
- /l/ is /lʲ/ initially and finally.
- Semivowels /w/ and /j/ only occur syllable initially.

=== Vowels ===
Vowels
	Front	Central	Back
High	i		u
Mid	e	ə	ɔ
Low		a	

== Orthography ==
Sursurunga has fifteen consonants—⟨b d g h k l m n ng p r s t w y⟩— and six vowels—⟨a á e i o u⟩.

⟨ng⟩ is the velar nasal /ŋ/ and ⟨á⟩ is the schwa.

== Number ==
Sursurunga is famous for having a five-way grammatical number distinction. The numbers beside singular, dual, and plural have been called trial and quadral; however, these numbers, which only occur on pronouns, indicate a minimum of three and four, not exactly three and four the way the dual indicates exactly two. They are equivalent to "a few" and "several", and Corbett has called them (lesser) paucal and greater paucal. The trial cannot be used for dyadic kinship terms, whereas the quadral is used for two or three such pair relationships.

Emphatic pronouns
	SG	DU	TRI	QUAD	PL
1.INCL	iau	giur	gimtul	gimhat	gim
1.EXCL	—	gitar	gittul	githat	git
2	iáu	gaur	gamtul	gamhat	gam
3	-i/on/ái	diar	ditul	dihat	di
