= Konomala language =

Oceanic language

Konomala
- Native to: Papua New Guinea
- Region: New Ireland
- Native speakers: (800 cited 1985)
- Language family: Austronesian: Malayo-Polynesian; Oceanic; Western; Meso-Melanesian; (St George linkage); Konomala
- Dialects: Laket; Konomala

Language codes
- ISO 639-3: koa
- Glottolog: kono1269
- ELP: Konomala

Konomala is an Oceanic language spoken on New Ireland in Papua New Guinea. Much of the population has shifted to Siar-Lak.
