= Nalik culture =

Nalik culture is the traditional culture of the Nalik people of northern New Ireland in Papua New Guinea. The Nalik language is spoken by approximately 5000 people, based in 14 villages on the east coast of New Ireland, and 3 on the west coast. A significant number of Nalik speakers live outside the language area, in Kavieng, Port Moresby and elsewhere.

Nalik society has a rich, complex and active traditional culture. Most famously, it features malagan ceremonies, and indeed malagan is a Nalik word.

Birds are extremely important to the Nalik culture.

In the 21st century, the Nalik culture is under threat from assimilation: "Nalik-speaking society will have to make important decisions by what defines its own identity." Senior members of the Nalik have been concerned about the declining "moral and social fabric" of Nalik culture, as well as the loss of their authority, leading them to start an elders' council in 2013.
