= Big Jock Knew =

Song sung by fans of Rangers

"Big Jock Knew" is a football chant sung by fans of Scottish football club Rangers. It is aimed to antagonise supporters of local rivals Celtic, alleging that former Celtic manager Jock Stein was aware of sexual abuse committed by former Celtic Boys Club manager Jim Torbett during the 1960s and 1970s, and did not notify the authorities.

== Background ==
During Torbett's trial in 1998, former Celtic Boys' Club chairman Hugh Birt claimed that Stein and the Celtic board were aware of and covered up allegations made against Torbett. In 2017 the Daily Record reported that the BBC "had spoken to three other former Celtic Boys' Club officials – who were employed at the time in question – who also say they were told Torbett was sacked by Stein after complaints Torbett had abused boys. But police were never called."

The official club statement following the conclusion of the 2018 trial, which expressed 'deep regret' over the abuse, asserted that they only became aware of allegations against Torbett in the mid-1990s.

== Reaction ==
The song has provoked controversy and has been condemned by several high-profile figures and organisations. UNICEF expressed concern over the song and called for it to be banned from football games. In 2007, Scottish Football Association Chief Executive Gordon Smith called the song "morally repugnant".
