= Tolai people =

Indigenous people in Papua New Guinea

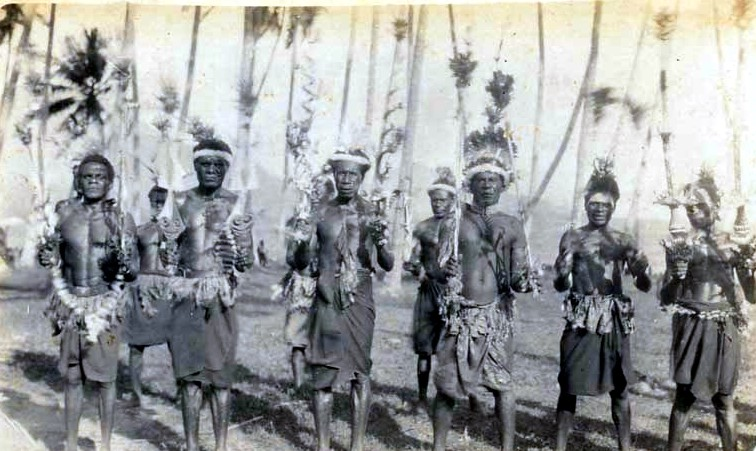
Tolai dancers

The Tolai are the indigenous people of the Gazelle Peninsula and the Duke of York Islands of East New Britain in the New Guinea Islands region of Papua New Guinea. They are ethnically close kin to the peoples of adjacent New Ireland and tribes like the Tanga people and are thought to have migrated to the Gazelle Peninsula in relatively recent times, displacing the Baining people who were driven westwards.

The majority of Tolais speak Kuanua as their first language (~100,000). Two other languages are spoken as first languages: Lungalunga and Bilur, each with approximately 2,000 speakers.

The Tolais almost universally define themselves as Christian and are predominantly Roman Catholic and United Church. Christianity was introduced to the island when Methodist ministers and teachers from Fiji arrived in the New Guinea islands region in 1875. However, in 1878 when some of the tribespeople ate four of the missionaries, the Englishman who led the missionaries, George Brown, directed and took part in a punitive expedition that resulted in a number of Tolais being killed and several villages burnt down.

In August 2007, the descendants of Tolai tribespeople who ate a Fijian minister and three Fijian teachers in 1878 publicly apologized for the incident to Fiji's High Commissioner, Ratu Isoa Tikoca. The apology was accepted. At the event, Papua New Guinea's Governor-General Paulias Matane told the crowd he appreciated the work of the early Fijian missionaries in spreading Christianity in the islands region.

Notwithstanding the Christianization of the Tolais for more than a century, old beliefs and traditions still persist, e.g., the belief in the female spirits of the Tubuans with secret ceremonies performed by initiates of the Duk-Duk society as well as the belief in sorcery to either gain someone's love or to punish an enemy.

The Tolais are divided into two moieties. Membership is determined by matrilineal descent.

== Prominent Tolais ==
- Sir Ronald ToVue (Former Premier of East New Britain (1981-1989))
- Sir Alkan Tololo (First Citizen Chancellor of UPNG & Unitech, later Vudal)
- Sir Rabbie Namaliu (4th Prime Minister of Papua New Guinea)
- Sir Paulias Matane (8th Governor General of Papua New Guinea and 1st Ambassador of PNG to USA)
- Grand Chief Damien Kereku (former Regional Member of East New Britain)
- Sir Henry ToRobert (1st Governor of the Bank of Papua New Guinea)
- Sir John Kaputin (Secretary General of ACP-EU - 2005 to 2010)
- Vin ToBaining (one of the first six elected indigenous members of the colonial-era Legislative Council of Papua and New Guinea)
- Sinai Brown (Former Premier of East New Britain (1989-1995))
- Margaret Nakikus (first woman to head PNG's National Planning Office. Wife of Rabbie Namaliu)
- George Telek (King of Tolai Rock)
- Anslom Nakikus (Reggae Artist)
- Michael Marum (Former SP PNG Hunters Coach and PNG Kumuls Coach)

== See also ==
- Shigeru Mizuki; He befriended and once was willing to assimilate himself with the tribe as being hospitalized during the World War II after he lost his left arm in the Battle of Rabaul. Later, he visited the tribe on New Britain.
