= Label language =

Oceanic language

Label
- Native to: Papua New Guinea
- Region: New Ireland
- Native speakers: (140 cited 1979 census)
- Language family: Austronesian: Malayo-Polynesian; Oceanic; Western; Meso-Melanesian; (St George linkage); Label–Bilur; Label

Language codes
- ISO 639-3: lbb
- Glottolog: labe1239
- ELP: Label

Label is a small Oceanic language spoken on New Ireland in Papua New Guinea. It is one of many Meso-Melanesian languages spoken on the island. The Label language is largely spoken on the south west of the island in a small pocket of space. It is not known to be spoken in any significant way outside of Papua New Guinea.

There are few speakers of the language, and is thus, endangered. Estimates vary between 140 (from a 1979 survey), up to 500 speakers. In 2005, the language was considered to be on the brink of extinction by som, with about 300 speakers.

== Resources ==
On 24 November 2024, the Label community came together to celebrate the launch of the Label New Testament. Until this translation, the Label language was an oral only language. Thus, to create the biblical text, an alphabet had to be created. At the launch event, there was a celebration with speeches, prayers, dancing, meals and a devotional message, accompanied by readings from the newly produced New Testament.

The New Testament in Label is available on the YouVersion Bible app, one of 1,600 languages on the app.

Furthermore, the Jesus Film is available to watch online in the Label language.
