= Guramalum language =

Language

Guramalum
- Native to: Papua New Guinea
- Region: New Ireland
- Extinct: c. 2000 (3–4 cited 1987)
- Language family: Austronesian: Malayo-Polynesian; Oceanic; New Ireland; Patpatar–Tolai; Guramalum

Language codes
- ISO 639-3: grz
- Glottolog: gura1254
- ELP: Guramalum
- Guramalum is classified as Critically Endangered by the UNESCO Atlas of the World's Languages in Danger.

Guramalum is a presumed extinct Oceanic language spoken on New Ireland in Papua New Guinea.
