= Tomoip language =

Oceanic language spoken in Papua New Guinea

Tomoip
- Native to: Papua New Guinea
- Region: New Britain
- Native speakers: (700 cited 1982)
- Language family: Austronesian: Malayo-Polynesian; Oceanic; Western Oceanic; Meso-Melanesian; Core Meso-Melanesian; Tomoip

Language codes
- ISO 639-3: tqp
- Glottolog: tomo1244

Tomoip is an Oceanic language of New Britain in Papua New Guinea.
