= Bulu language (Oceanic) =

Language spoken in Papua New Guinea

Bulu
- Native to: Papua New Guinea
- Native speakers: (910 cited 2000 census)
- Language family: Austronesian: Malayo-Polynesian; Oceanic; Western; Meso-Melanesian; Willaumez; Bulu

Language codes
- ISO 639-3: bjl
- Glottolog: bulu1253
- ELP: Bulu

Bulu is an Oceanic language of West New Britain in Papua New Guinea.
