= Tungag language =

Austronesian language of New Ireland Province, Papua New Guinea

Tungag
- Lavongai
- Native to: Papua New Guinea
- Region: New Hanover Island, New Ireland Province
- Native speakers: (12,000 cited 1990)
- Language family: Austronesian: Malayo-Polynesian; Oceanic; Western; Meso-Melanesian; (New Ireland); Tungag–Nalik; Tungag

Language codes
- ISO 639-3: lcm
- Glottolog: tung1290

Tungag, or Lavongai, is an Austronesian language of New Ireland Province, Papua New Guinea, localized New Hanover, the native name of which is Lavongai.

Since Lavongai is an Austronesian language, it follows several of the unique characteristics of this language group. Examples include the specific form for the singular, dual, trial and plural tense, the clarity of knowing if the person spoken to is included or excluded in the dual, trial and plural tenses, and the defining of the possessive tense expressed by an ending added to the noun. However, unlike the languages spoken in Papua New Guinea, it has not adopted and mixed with other languages.

It is spoken on the island of New Hanover and its neighboring islands. There are different dialects of the Lavongai language. The major difference between the language dialects is between the villages of the south coast and the villages from the western tip to the islands on the north coast. There are also smaller differences between villages, but it does not have a major effect on the communication between these villages.

Its endangered level (according to Ethnologue) is 5, which means it is a language used frequently, so there is no fear that it will be endangered, but is not considered the main language of New Guinea.

== Phonology ==
Phoneme inventory of the Tungag language:

Consonant sounds
		Labial		Alveolar	Velar
Plosive	voiceless/tense	p pː		t tː	k kː
Plosive	voiced/tense	b		d	g ɡː
Nasal		m mː		n nː	ŋ ŋː
Rhotic				r	
Fricative	voiceless/tense	ɸ		s sː	(x, ɣ)
Fricative	voiced	β	v		(x, ɣ)
Lateral				l lː	

/x, ɣ/ are allophones of /k, ɡ/.

Vowel sounds
	Front	Back	
High	i	u	
Mid	ɛ	ʌ	ɔ
Low		ɑ	

== Sound system ==
(Note: These references do not include /ɸ, β, x, ɣ, ɔ/ and germinate consonants)

=== Alphabet ===
In the Lavongai language, there are 21 letters – six vowels and fifteen consonants. These letters are ⟨ʌ, a, b, d, e, f, g, h, i, k, l, m, n, ŋ, o, p, r, s, t, u, v⟩.

=== Vowels ===
In the Lavongai language, there are six vowels: a, e, i, o, u, ʌ.

The /ʌ/ is pronounced as the /uh/ in butter. The other vowels, /a/, /e/, /i/, /o/, /u/, are pronounced the same as their pronunciation in the Latin language. Thus they all can be pronounced as a long vowel or a short vowel. However, the /i/ retains its /i/ sound unlike the Latin language, in which the /i/ is pronounced as /y/ if the i is behind another vowel.

=== Consonants ===
In the Lavongai language, there are 15 consonants: b, d, f, g, h, k, l, m, n, ŋ, p, r, s, t, v.

Many consonants can be replaced/deleted.

==== f and p ====
Some consider f and h letters in the alphabet, but others do not.

The letter f can usually be replaced by the letter p.

- kafil / kapil – 'the headgear of the women'
- difil / dipil – 'to come back from fishing without result'

While there are some cases where p cannot replace f, the number of cases is very small.

- tapak cannot become tafak
  - tafak – 'lightning'
  - tapak – 'leprosy'

==== b and v ====
The letter b can be replaced by v.

- beŋebeŋe/veŋeveŋe – 'the hornbill'
- bil/vil – 'to do, the deed'
- bis/vis – 'to fight, the fight'

==== r and d ====
The letter r can be replaced by d.

- rauŋ/dauŋ – 'to kill, the killing'
- ororuŋ/oroduŋ – 'to dream, the dream'
- rokot/dokot – 'stick fast'
- ruduai/duduai – 'to meet'

==== h ====
Unlike like the above letters, the letter h is normally dropped. Dropping the letter h in a word does not change the meaning at all.

- hat/at – 'stone'
- hainʌ/ainʌ – 'woman/female'
- his/is – 'nose'

=== Diphthongs ===
In the Lavongai language, there are seven diphthongs: /au/, /oi/, /ai/, /ei/, /ao/, /eu/, and /ua/.

The diphthongs /au/, /oi/, /ai/ have the same pronunciation as the diphthongs in how, high, and boy in English. However, the other diphthongs do not have a perfect sound.

==== /au/ ====
The diphthong /au/ can sometimes replace the vowel a if it is a three-letter word and between two consonants and vice versa. This practice is more common in the dialects spoken on the north coast.

- sap may be changed into saup – 'to beat'
- ŋat may be changed into ŋaut – 'cut grass'
- tan may be changed into taun* – 'the day'
- ŋanvak may be changed into ŋanwauk – 'the morning'
- ilesvak may be changed into ilesvauk – 'tomorrow'

However, this replacement can not be done to every word. Listed below are some of the words that can not have use the a/au replacement.

- vap – 'people'
- nat – 'son'
- mat – 'dead'
- taun* – 'to cook'

Note: taun has two meanings: 'the day' or to cook'.

==== /ua/ ====
The diphthong /ua/ can sometimes be replaced with the vowels o or a.

- a pua nat / a po nat – 'the boys'
- a pua aina / a pa aina – 'the women'
- a veua / a veo – 'the shark'

==== /ai/ and /ei/ ====
The diphthongs /ai/ and /ei/ can be used interchangeably.

- nei/nai – 'in, the inner part, the intestines'
- vei/vai – 'not, lest'
- veiniŋ/vainiŋ

== Grammar ==
=== Nouns ===
==== Proper nouns and mass nouns ====
These are nouns that cannot be marked with a possession marker, nor can they be counted.

- kʌ-g Kerek – 'my Kerek' (Kerek is a name)
- lamʌn – 'water'

==== Alienable and inalienably possessed nouns ====
Alienable nouns are nouns that have a possessive pronoun preceding the noun.

- kʌ-mem ŋono posong – 'our two names'
- kʌ-g aina – 'my wife'

Inalienable nouns are nouns that use a suffix to express the possessive.

- pukun-ina – 'its body'
- ŋur-uria – 'their mouths'

=== Counting numbers ===
When counting from one to ten, the Lavongai language counts based on groups of fives and tens.

==== 1–4 ====
The numerals 'one' through 'four' are mono-morphemic words.

- sikei – 'one'
- ponguʌ – 'two'
- potol – 'three'
- puat – 'four'

==== 5 ====
The numeral 'five' is distinct with its two-morpheme composition.

- pal-pal lima – 'five'

==== 6–9 ====
The numerals 'six' through 'nine' are based on adding 'one' through 'four' to the numeral 'five'.

- lima-le-sikei – 'five-from-one / six'

The words for 'two' to 'four' can be shortened by omitting the first syllable and changing o to u.

- puat → -at
- ponguʌ → -nguʌ
- potol → -tul
- lima-le-at – 'five-from-four / nine'

==== 10 ====
Likewise to the numeral 'five', 'ten' also has a distinct two-morpheme composition.

- sikei a sangauli – 'ten'

=== Sentence structure ===
The Lavongai language follows the SVO (subject–verb–object) structure.

Sentence structure types
Intransitive clause
Subject / verb phrase / adjunct
Transitive clause (1 complement)
Subject / verb phrase / direct object / adjunct
Transitive clause (2 complements)
Subject / verb phrase / direct object / indirect object / adjunct
Transitive clause, speech and perception verbs (2 complements)
Subject / verb phrase / direct object / ta / indirect object / adjunct
Negation on the sentence level
Subject / parik / pa verb phrase / adjunct
Prohibition (negative imperative)
Subject / ago ta / verb phrase / adjunct / -an / direct object
Coordinate conjunction
Verb phrase / coordinating conjunction / verb phrase
Subordinate conjunction
Verb phrase / subordinate conjunction / verb phrase
Fronted object
Direct object / subject / verb phrase / trace object / indirect object / adjunct
Fronted verb phrase
Verb phrase / subject
