= Nakanai language =

Language in Papua New Guinea

Nakanai
- Lakalai
- Native to: Papua New Guinea
- Native speakers: (13,000 cited 1981)
- Language family: Austronesian: Malayo-Polynesian; Oceanic; Western; Meso-Melanesian; Willaumez; Nakanai

Language codes
- ISO 639-3: nak
- Glottolog: naka1262

Nakanai is spoken by the Nakanai tribe in West New Britain, a province of Papua New Guinea. It is an Austronesian language, belonging to the Malayo-Polynesian subgroup. Otherwise known as Nakonai, it also has dialects in the form of Losa, Bileki, Vere, Ubae, and Maututu.

The name Nakanai is natively pronounced Lakalai, as the alveolar nasal [n] has disappeared from the phonemic inventory of the language and has been replaced by [l].

The name given to the Nakanai people by the indigenous people, before the Tolai name of Nakanai was adopted, was either Muku or Muu. Those were derogatory words, and in Nakanai mean 'to screw up the nose in distaste', and 'humming sound made by masked men', respectively.

== History ==
Due to links between Nakanai and Eastern Oceanic languages, it is believed that its language family speakers arrived from the east of Papua New Guinea.

New Britain had experienced regular contact and settlement from 1840 to 1883, but the lack of coverage and useful records of the Nakanai region had the region deemed terra incognita.

== Speakers ==
Nakanai is spoken by people living in the West New Britain Province of Papua New Guinea. They live in around 45 villages in the coastal and hinterland regions of Cape Hoskins, Commodore Bay, Cape Reilnitz, Bangula Bay, and Cape Koas.

The dialects that make up the Nakanai language are Bileki, Ubae, Vele, Loso, and Maututu, respectively from the west-most to the east-most of the Nakanai-speaking areas.

Of all the dialects spoken, Bileki has the most native speakers due to being in a more densely populated area. It is common for speakers of other dialects to understand, or even speak, Bileki, but the reverse is not as common. There are 19 Bileki-speaking villages centered around Cape Hoskins and Commodore Bay. It also has a number of names, including Beleki and Central Nakanai. South-East of the Bileki area are the Ubae speakers, located in the Ubae and Gusi villages. Vele speakers are centered on the coastal and adjacent regions of Bangula Bay, in particular, the villages of Tarobi, Pasusu, Sisimi, Gaekeke, Kai and Kaiamo. Loso (or Auka) is a dialect of Nakanai spoken in the Silanga region, inland of Lasibu Anchorage. The villages are Kotoo Babata and Loa, all resettled at Silanga; Um, Bagela, Bibisi and Sipa, all resettled at or near Uasilau; and Movai, Sabol, Saiko, and a portion of Sipa, which are still situated on traditional land in the bush. The villages of the Maututu dialect are Matililiu, Gomu, Apulpul, Baikakea, Bubuu, Mataururu, Kiava and Evase, all grouped on the eastern coast of the Nakanai area, between Toiru River and Cape Koas. These are all United Church Villages and have been influenced therefore by Tolai-speaking missionaries and Nassa shell traders, plus contact with Melamela to the east, Bileki and Vele to the west, and the inland languages Longeinga, Wasi and Kol.

== Grammar ==
=== Sociolinguistic choices ===
The noun article is obligatory when referring to an object, and when addressing an object, the noun article is never used.

Avoiding the use of names in speech is a way of showing esteem, whether one is talking about a person in reference or when addressing them. To use a person's name without good reason is seen as a form of disrespect. Instead, kinship terms are preferred. Esteem, in face–to–face conversations, is also displayed by referring to the addressee in the third person.

== Syntax ==
=== Thematic roles ===
In terms of case relations, "Nakanai role structure operates morphologically as follows: there are six contrastive cases, Actor, which appears as the immediately pre-verbal NP; Patient, which appears in the unmarked instance as the immediately post-verbal NP; Source; which is the NP immediately preceded by the post-verbal ablative particle le; Beneficiary, which is encoded by inalienable possession suffixation of the verb; Instrument, signaled by ablative particle le, but appearing discontinuously from it, the Patient-NP obligatorily intervening; and Goal encoded by the preposition te. "Additionally, directional verbs in chained sequence such as tavu (towards) and taro (away from) encode goal and source relationship respectively. relationships of Direction, Range, Location and comitative are encoded by prepositionally-coreferential topic deletion."

Fundamental division of Nakanai cases in case relations:

- Nuclear roles filling positions of referential prominence: actor, beneficiary, patient
- Nuclear roles filling positions of non-referential prominence: goal, instrument, source
- Peripheral roles (necessarily referentially non-prominent: location, direction, range, comitative

==== Actor ====
The actor is typically the animate entity credited for the action in a sentence. In Nakanai, the action includes the source, the undergoer and the experiencer of, "a caused or spontaneous process, or mental state or event." The actor noun phrase will precede the verb in the language.

==== Patient ====
The patient is affected by the action or state identified by the verb in a sentence. They receive this external action or exhibit a state identified by a verb.

E Baba kue(-a) e Bubu
ART Baba strike-3SG ART Bubu
Baba struck Bubu

E Baba kama-kokora
ART Baba bad
Baba is bad

In transitive clauses, the patient noun phrase is encoded by suffixation of the verb with a third-person singular affix -a. The accusative marking is optional for noun phrases with given information.

E Baba kue(-a) la paia
ART Baba strike-3SG ART dog
Baba struck the dog

Egite barautu isahari egite siapani
they(PL) cut some they(PL) Japan
they cut some Japanese soldiers

Japanese soldiers represent the new information.

The beneficiary or source noun phrases must precede the patient in a sentence, the two not being in the same sentence.

E Baba abi-a-le tila-la la bua
ART Baba give-3SG-3SG.INAL/ART mother-3SG.INAL ART {areca nut}
Baba gave his mother areca nuts

"The patient case appears in the nominal slot immediately following the verb, and potentially preceded by accusative suffix -a on the verb. This is the statistically most frequent occurrence of Patient."

==== Beneficiary ====
These represent the animate beneficiary of the action or state identified by a verb. They are an inalienable possession marking agreeing with the beneficiary in number and person inclusiveness.

ACT {} VP BEN
E Baba vitaho-a-le Bubu
ART baba escort-3SG-3SG.INAL/ART Bubu
Baba escorted Bubu

Occurs mostly in ditransitive clauses, where it must occur in the nominal slot immediately following the verb:

ACT {} VP BEN PAT {}
E Baba abi-a-le Bubu la bua
ART Baba give-3SG-3SG.INAL/ART Bubu ART {areca nut}
Baba gave Bubu areca nuts

==== Instrument ====
For intransitive clauses they may represent: the inanimate force

ACT {} VP INS {}
E Baba lea le bubuli
ART Baba sick ABL measles
Baba is sick with measles

the independent non-volitional cause, animate

ACT {} VP INS {}
E Baba sagege le loli
ART Baba happy ABL lollies
Baba is happy with the lollies

inanimate

ACT {} Modal VP INS {}
E Baba ge iloburuko le amiteu
ART Baba IRR worry {ABL ART} us
Baba will be worried about us

For transitive clauses, "[the] instrument is the case of the object accessory or tool involved in performing the action of the verb." They are always inanimate. With an actor, it appears as the last noun phrase in the clause, marked with post-verbal ablative particle le. Without an actor, it may appear as the clause topic. "it is not a plausible analysis to regard le marking Instrument-NP as signalling Instrument outranked by another role (Patient), like English with, since this alternative does not explain the invariant ordering of the instrumental clause."

==== Sources ====
In ditransitive clauses, the source "represents the animate origin of an action in which a patient is moved away from source-entity by [an] actor"

ACT {} VP {} SRC {} PAT {}
E Baba abi taro le Bubu la bua
ART Baba get away ABL Bubu ART {areca nut}
Baba took away from Bubu the areca nut

source marked by ablative particle le, appears post-verbally in first nominal slot."

==== Goal ====
Goals are encoded by the free particle te. It is the case of the entity toward which the action is directed. It includes: destination, purpose, place, extent, or reason or topic of conversation. It is usually the last noun phrase in the clause.

ACT {} VP Goal {}
E Baba sae te sipi
ART Baba board PREP ship
Baba boarded the/a ship

==== Location ====
ACT {} VP LOC {} {} {}
[E Baba pou] [o-io (te) la hohoi].
ART Baba sit at-there PREP ART bush
Baba stayed in the bush.

ACT {} VP LOC {} {} {}
[E Baba sae] [so-ata (te) la kari].
ART Baba climb to-up PREP ART truck
Baba climbed up onto the truck.

"Location may be optionally encoded by preposition te in addition to the coverb encoding Locative. Preposition te indicates that the embedded locative clause contains a nuclear case, viz. goal.

Depending on involvement of motion or whether the verb is transitive or not, there may be coreferential actor or patient deletion.

ACT {} VP PAT {} LOC {} {}
[E Baba paha la uaga] [o-io la hohoi]
ART Baba carve ART canoe at-there ART bush
Baba carved a canoe in the bush.

ACT {} VP PAT {} LOC {} {}
[E Baba tigitaro la lalu] [so-talo la magasa]
ART Baba pour.out ART water to-down ART ground
Baba poured out the water onto the ground.

Coreferential topic deletion of actor noun phrase is not obligatory in the presence of motion verbs with the root go- 'to proceed'. "

==== Range ====
Range is encoded as the goal of the direction verb kara 'until/as far as', appearing as the main verb, or in a chained sequence with another verb. "It indicates a relationship of spatial extent or temporal duration:"

ACT VP Range {} {} {} {}
[Egite go-io] [pou kara (te) la logo.]
they(PL) go-there sit until PREP ART night
They then remained until nightfall

"This clause shows two instances of coreferential topic deletion in clauses in chained sequence. The obligatory coreferential topic deletion of the actor noun phrase potentially appearing with kara is illustrated in the second embedded clause. Note too that the preposition in this clause is optional."

== Orthography ==
Nakanai has five vowels, ⟨a, e, i, o, u⟩, and has the consonants ⟨p, b, t, d, k, g, s, h, r, l, n, ng⟩.

== Phonology ==
Nakanai syllables may be of the shape V or CV, with no codas or consonant clusters to be found anywhere in the language.

Phonology of the Nakanai language:

Consonant sounds
		Labial	Alveolar	Dorsal	Glottal
Plosive	voiceless	p	t	k	
Plosive	voiced	b	d	g	
Nasal		m	(n)		
Rhotic			r		
Lateral			l		
Fricative		β	s		h
Glide		(w)		(j)	

/i, u/ in initial position are heard as glides [j, w]. [n] is mostly replaced by /l/ and is only heard across other dialects.

Vowel sounds
	Front	Central	Back
High	i		u
Mid	e		o
Low		a	

=== Phonological rules ===
Orthography	Feature
w	/u/
y	/i/
v	[β]
r	flap/trill
/t/	[ts] before i
i after t	infrequent sound
u after m	infrequent sound
h	not usually articulated

Younger Bileki speakers, typically younger than 30 years old, tend to drop the /h/ sound from their speech. The Methodist parts of Nakanai also drop the /h/ sound as a result of Kuanuan language influence.

Word	Dropped /h/	Gloss
la havi	la avi	fire
saho	sao	water

The presence of English, Pidgin and Tolai brought in the change of /l/ to /n/ in areas where this change has occurred.

=== Phonological differences ===
The dialects of Nakanai mainly differ in the sounds that they use.

==== Bileki ====
For the most popular dialect, Bileki, their /g/s are /d/s, /k/s are /ʔ/s, /l/s are /n/s for a number of words, and /r/s are /s/s.

Bileki also shares phonological similarities with another language in the New Britain area, Melamela, which is located east of the Maututu-speaking regions. Phonological differences lie in the different rendition of certain phonemes.

Bileki phoneme	Melamela phoneme
/g/	/d/
/k/	/ʔ/
/l/	/n/
/r/	/s/

=== Ubae ===
In Ubae, the Bileki habit of dropping the /h/ sound from their speech has caused the la noun marker to turn into l- for words starting with a vowel. For example:

Sentence	Gloss
l-ivu-la	his/her hair
l-ase-la	his/her mouth

/k/ is present in Ubae speech, /l/ and /s/ are sometimes alternated in basic words, and the /l/ and /r/ change from their Vele neighbors is not present.

=== Vele ===
Like the Bileki dialect, the /h/ sound has been dropped from Vele speech. The /l/ is rendered as the /r/ sound, and the /k/ as the /ʔ/. Their noun marker la drops the /l/, transforming it to just a. Vele also has had contact with Bileki-speaking Methodist pastors, and thus the Methodist villages, Kaiamo and Sulu, speak a dialect that is moving closer to Bileki.

=== Loso/Auka ===
Similar to Bileki, the /h/ sound is missing. They also use the /n/ sound in place of /l/. Similar to Vele, the noun marker la is simplified to just a. Despite neighboring Vele, their /k/ sounds do not change to /ʔ/.

=== Maututu ===
Maututu's phonemic inventory shares a strong resemblance with Bileki's.

== Vocabulary ==
Speakers exposed to English borrow English lexical items, as well as mix in words from Pidgin into their speech. The practice is frowned upon, despite being widely practiced.

English	Borrowed
married	marid
greedy	gridi

Religion plays a part in the vocabulary used in the Nakanai-speaking regions. About 61.74% of speakers are Catholic, while the rest are Methodists of the United Church. The Catholic areas keep older Nakanai words that were replaced in other parts. Methodist areas borrow words from the Kuanuan language.

There are distinct kinship terms and their use depends on whether the person is being referred to or being addressed.

Reference	Address	Gloss
e tamisa-gu	lavogu	my cross-cousin
e tubu-gu	pupu	my grandparent
e iva-gu	laiva	my brother-in-law

Nakanai has, over time, experienced lexical innovation. One driving force behind lexical innovation in the language is to be able to "discuss matters without outsiders understanding key words." An example:

Sentence	Gloss	Translation
e maisu-mata	noun-marker straight nose	'White person'

Lexical innovation also comes in the form of borrowing terms from the surrounding languages, mainly Tolai, Pidgin and English, to cover foreign objects. An example:

e moro	le uaga	e sipi (from Pidgin)	'ship'

Before the borrowing of lexical terms, they would make do with creative reactions to new objects that arrived to New Britain from foreign sources.

Reactionary term (literal translation)	Current term	Meaning
koko-robo (excrete covering)	rositi	rusted, rusty
la gala-muli-guaru (crawl-along-road)	la kari	truck, vehicle

Along with adding new terms, they have also expanded existing ones to match new experiences introduced by foreigners.

Term	Original meaning	Expanded meaning
gigi	'count'	'read, receive, education'
kaka	'ask'	'pray'

There are also unnecessary borrowings in the forms of functional term and calques:

Word (origin)	Word (Nakanai)	Meaning
oraet (Pidgin)	ioge	'so, well'
ma (Tolai)	me	'and'

Expression (literal)	Meaning (original expression)
karutu gegeru ('Shaken badly')	accuse (Pidgin sutim long tok)
hatamalei ('Man!')	Pidgin olaman

=== Ubae ===
Ubae, compared to its neighbor Vele, has numerous lexical differences from Bileki, taking from other Eastern Nakanai dialects. For example, consider the words la voto: this means 'dog'. Voto, or 'dog', is found in the Eastern Nakanai dialects; however, Ubae still uses the Bileki article la instead of e, which is found in other Eastern Nakanai dialects.

== Lexicon ==
Word	Category	Gloss
ali	transitive verb	give
agi	adverb	too much
alaura	adverb	long ago
ale mave	adverb	which
ali	transitive verb	which
baa	noun	area, space
baha	transitive verb	send a person or a spoken message
balava	intransitive verb	get something for nothing
baratu	transitive verb	cut
belo	noun	return
beua	intransitive verb	return
bisi	intransitive verb	small, young, insignificant
bisnis	noun	business
bokis	noun	box
bolo	noun	pig
bububu	adverb	pointlessly
bulahu	adverb	for no reason
buli	transitive verb	roll
didiman	noun	agricultural officer
gabu	transitive verb	think about
gabutatala	transitive verb	think about
gabutatalala	noun	thinking
gale	noun	area, region
gali	intransitive verb	advance, merge
galili	adverb	around
galolo	adverb	constantly, tediously
gauru	noun	path, road
gigi	transitive verb	count, read
gilemuli	transitive verb	tell a story
gima	noun	appointed place
go-LOC	intransitive verb	go to stated location
golo	adverb	deceivingly, temporarily
gulutu	noun	cooking
gutu	transitive verb	cook
hagavi	intransitive verb	near
harare	noun	banks of river
harepala	intransitive verb	open one's mouth
haro	noun	sun, day
(ha)ta(vi)vile	noun	women
hele	intransitive verb	flee, run desperately
hihilo	-	reduplication of hilo
hiliti	intransitive verb	stand up
hilo	transitive verb	see
igo	transitive verb	do, make
igotataho	transitive verb	show off
igovavai	intransitive verb	snigger
igogolu	noun	work
ilali-la	noun	eating
-ilo	locative suffix	in, inside, inland
-io	locative suffix	there
isa-	noun	name
kabili	intransitive verb	in the middle
kaka	transitive verb	ask, request
kaluvu	transitive verb	finish
kamada	noun	carpenter
kamu	transitive verb	grasp
kapu	transitive verb	pulp
