= VMessage =

vMessage is a file format used for the storage and exchange of short messages, typically SMS messages, between mobile devices and desktop computers. The format is used by multiple vendors, including Nokia, Siemens and Palm, and is similar to the commonly used vCard format. vCard is used within the format to embed contact information for the sender of the message.

The vMessage standard is defined by IrDA (Infrared Data Association) in the IrDA Infrared Mobile Communications (IrMC) v1.1 specification. The file extension used when transferring vMessages is vmg. This standard is mainly concerned with defining methods of exchanging personal data such as business cards, appointments, and notes between mobile devices.

A sub-set of the specification is available here.
