= Bola language (Austronesian) =

Oceanic language in Papua New Guinea

Bola
- Bakovi
- Native to: Papua New Guinea
- Native speakers: (14,000 cited 2000 census)
- Language family: Austronesian: Malayo-Polynesian; Oceanic; Western Oceanic; Meso-Melanesian; Willaumez; Bola

Language codes
- ISO 639-3: bnp
- Glottolog: bola1250
- ELP: Bola

Bola, or Bakovi, is an Oceanic language of West New Britain in Papua New Guinea. The Harua (Xarua) dialect developed on a palm plantation.

== Phonology ==
Phonology of the Bola language:

Consonant sounds
	Labial	Alveolar	Velar
Nasal	m	n	ŋ
Plosive	p b	t d	k g
Fricative	β	(s)	ɣ
Rhotic		r	
Lateral		l	

/t/ is realized as /s, ʃ/ only when occurring in front of /i/. The voiced stops /b d ɡ/ can often sound prenasalized [ᵐb ⁿd ᵑɡ] among various speakers. /ɣ/ can be pronounced as a glottal fricative [h] among younger speakers.

Vowel sounds
	Front	Central	Back
High	i		u
Mid	ɛ		ɔ
Low		ɑ	

/i/ before vowel sounds /ɑ ɛ ɔ u/ is pronounced as a glide sound [j].
