= Madak language =

Western Oceanic language

Madak
- Region: New Ireland
- Native speakers: (3,000 cited 1985)
- Language family: Austronesian: Malayo-Polynesian; Oceanic; Western; Meso-Melanesian; (New Ireland); Madak languages; Madak

Language codes
- ISO 639-3: mmx
- Glottolog: mada1285

Madak, also known as Mandak, is an Austronesian language spoken in New Ireland, Papua New Guinea. The Library of Congress subject classification uses Mandak.

== Phonology ==
Consonants
	Labial	Alveolar	Velar	Glottal
Plosive	p b	t d	k g	(ʔ ⟨'⟩)
Fricative	β ⟨v⟩	s	ɣ ⟨x⟩	
Nasal	m	n	ŋ ⟨ng⟩	
Approximant		r, l		

- /ʔ/ only appears word-finally.
- The voiced plosives /b d g/ are prenasalised [ᵐb ⁿd ᵑg] word-medially.
- The unvoiced plosives /p t k/ are unreleased [p̚ t̚ k̚] when in syllable codas.

Vowels
	Front	Central	Back
High	i		u
Mid	e		o
Low		a	

Additionally, Madak has the following diphthongs: /ei/, /ai/, /iu/, /ao/, /au/.

Stress is predictable, occurring on the second syllable. Syllables containing the consonants /ɣ/, /β/, or /r/ are skipped when determining stress.
