= Lavatbura-Lamusong language =

Language

Lavatbura-Lamusong
- Native to: Papua New Guinea
- Region: New Ireland
- Native speakers: (1,300 cited 1972)
- Language family: Austronesian: Malayo-Polynesian; Oceanic; Western; Meso-Melanesian; (New Ireland); Madak; Lavatbura-Lamusong

Language codes
- ISO 639-3: lbv
- Glottolog: lava1239

Lavatbura and Lamusong are dialects of an Austronesian language of New Ireland, Papua New Guinea.
