= Ramoaaina language =

Oceanic language spoken on the Duke of York Islands off eastern New Ireland

Ramoaaina
- Duke of York
- Native to: Papua New Guinea
- Region: Duke of York Islands (East New Britain Province)
- Native speakers: (10,300 cited 2000 census)
- Language family: Austronesian: Malayo-Polynesian; Oceanic; Western; Meso-Melanesian; (St George linkage); Kandas–Ramoaaina; Ramoaaina

Language codes
- ISO 639-3: rai
- Glottolog: ramo1244

Ramoaaina (Ramuaina) is an Oceanic language spoken on the Duke of York Islands off eastern New Ireland.

== Phonology ==
Phoneme inventory of the Ramoaaina language:

Consonant sounds
		Labial	Alveolar	Velar
Nasal		m	n	ŋ
Plosive	voiceless	p	t	k
Plosive	voiced	b	d	g
Fricative			(s)	
Rhotic			r	
Lateral			l	
Semivowel		w		

/s/ is used, but mainly in loanwords.

Vowel sounds
	Front	Central	Back
High	i		u
Mid	e	ɘ	o
Low		a	
