= Barok language =

Oceanic language spoken in Papua New Guinea

Barok
- Region: New Ireland
- Native speakers: 2,700 (2010)
- Language family: Austronesian: Malayo-Polynesian; Oceanic; Western; Meso-Melanesian; (New Ireland); Madak; Barok

Language codes
- ISO 639-3: bjk
- Glottolog: baro1253

Barok is an Austronesian language spoken in New Ireland, Papua New Guinea.

== Sources ==
- Du, Jingyi (2010). Towards a Grammar of the Usen Dialect of the Barok language New Ireland, Papua New Guinea (Ph.D. thesis). La Trobe University. hdl:1959.9/492969.
