= Bilur language =

Oceanic language of the Papua New Guinea

Bilur
- Minigir
- Native to: Papua New Guinea
- Region: East New Britain Province
- Native speakers: 4,200 (2012)
- Language family: Austronesian: Malayo-Polynesian; Oceanic; Western; Meso-Melanesian; (St George linkage); Label–Bilur; Bilur

Language codes
- ISO 639-3: bxf
- Glottolog: bilu1244

Bilur, also ambiguously known as Minigir, is an Oceanic language of the Papua New Guinea. It is not closely related to other languages, and its classification is uncertain.
