= Siar-Lak language =

Austronesian language

Siar
- Lak
- ep warwar anun dat
- Native to: Papua New Guinea
- Region: New Ireland Province
- Native speakers: (2,100 cited 2000 census)
- Language family: Austronesian: Malayo-Polynesian; Oceanic; Western; Meso-Melanesian; (St George linkage); Siar

Language codes
- ISO 639-3: sjr
- Glottolog: siar1238

Siar, also known as Lak, Lamassa, or Likkilikki, is an Austronesian language spoken in New Ireland Province in the southern island point of Papua New Guinea. Lak is in the Patpatar-Tolai sub-group, which then falls under the New Ireland-Tolai group in the Western Oceanic language, a sub-group within the Austronesian family. The Siar people keep themselves sustained and nourished by fishing and gardening. The native people call their language ep warwar anun dat, which means 'our language'.

== Phonology ==
Siar-Lak has fifteen consonants and seven vowels.

Consonant phonemes
| | | Bilabial | Dental- Alveolar | Palatal | Velar |
|---|---|---|---|---|---|
| Nasal | | m | n | | ŋ |
| Plosive | voiceless | p | t | | k |
| Plosive | voiced | b | d | | g |
| Fricative | | ɸ | s | | |
| Lateral | | | l | | |
| Trill | | | r | | |
| Glide | | w | | j | |

Vowel phonemes
| | Front | Central | Back |
|---|---|---|---|
| High | i | | u |
| Mid-high | e̝ | | o̝ |
| Mid | e | | o |
| Low | | a | |

The vowel /e̝/ can be thought to be pronounced in between the high vowel /i/ and the mid vowel /e/, as well as /o̝/ being in between the high vowel /u/ and the mid vowel /o/, according to native speakers.

== Stress and phonotactics ==
Stress is placed on the last syllable in each word. Examples of words broken down into syllables and translated include:

| Siar-Lak | English |
|---|---|
| mam.su.ai | 'sneeze' |
| ar.ngas | 'mountain peak' |
| far.bón | 'praise' |
| fet.rar | 'young woman' |

== Syllable structures ==
Siar-Lak contains four different types of syllable patterns in its vocabulary: V (vowel), VC (vowel-consonant), CV (consonant-vowel), and CVC (consonant-vowel-consonant). Some examples include:

| | Siar Lak | English |
|---|---|---|
| V | u | 'you' |
| | a.im | 'to plant' |
| | a.i.nói | 'to fill' |
| VC | ep | 'article' |
| | ar.ngas | 'mountain' |
| | la.un | 'to live' |
| CV | ma | 'now' |
| | kó.bót | 'morning' |
| | ka.bu.suk | 'my nose' |
| | la.tu | 'tomorrow' |
| CVC | póp | 'puddle' |
| | gósgós | 'to dance' |
| | la.man.tin | 'great' |
| | ka.kau | 'to crawl' |

== Orthography ==
Siar-Lak is written in the Latin script. Most letters correspond directly to a single phoneme and vice versa. However, the consonant phoneme /φ/ is spelled ⟨f⟩ at the start of a word, ⟨h⟩ at the end of a syllable, and not spelled at all when it is not pronounced. When a word-final /i/ needs to be distinguished from /j/, it is spelled ⟨ii⟩. /e̝/ and /o̝/ are spelled ⟨é⟩ and ⟨ó⟩ respectively. /w/ and /j/ are spelled ⟨u⟩ and ⟨i⟩ in syllable codas.

== Numerical system ==
Numbers 1–10
| Siar | English |
|---|---|
| i tik | One |
| i ru | Two |
| i tól | Three |
| i at | Four |
| i lim | Five |
| i won | Six |
| i is | Seven |
| i wol | Eight |
| i siwok | Nine |
| sanguli or i tik ep bónót | Ten |

Numbers 10–100
| Siar | English |
|---|---|
| i tik ep bónót | Ten |
| i ru ru bónót | Twenty |
| i tól ep bónót | Thirty |
| i at ep bónót | Forty |
| i lim ep bónót | Fifty |
| i won ep bónót | Sixty |
| i is ep bónót | Seventy |
| i wol ep bónót | Eighty |
| i siwok ep bónót | Ninety |
| i tik ep mar | One hundred |

== Pronouns ==
Independent pronouns
| | | Singular | Dual | Trial/Paucal | Plural |
|---|---|---|---|---|---|
| 1st person | exclusive | ya(u)/ a | mara(u) | mató~matól | mét |
| 1st person | inclusive | | dara(u) | datól | dat |
| 2nd person | | u | aura(u) | amtól | amat |
| 3rd person | Personal | i | dira(u) | diat | dit |
| 3rd person | Impersonal | | | | di |
| 3rd person | Inanimate, mass | | | | in |

Example sentence:

Yau, a rak al an ka-sai an Kokopo.
1S 1S want 1S.POT at DIR-west at Kokopo
'As for me, I want to go to Kokopo.'

== Verb phrases ==
Two types of verb phrases include intransitive and transitive verbs. An intransitive verb is used when there is no direct object, while a transitive verb is used when there is a direct object action taking place. An intransitive verb for 'eat' would be angan, while a transitive verb for 'eat' would be yan.
