= Kara language (Papua New Guinea) =

Oceanic language spoken in Papua New Guinea

Kara
- Region: New Ireland Province, Papua New Guinea
- Native speakers: (5,000 cited 1998)
- Language family: Austronesian: Malayo-Polynesian; Oceanic; Western; Meso-Melanesian; (New Ireland); Tungag–Nalik; Kara
- Writing system: Latin

Language codes
- ISO 639-3: leu
- Glottolog: kara1486

Kara (also Lemusmus or Lemakot) is an Austronesian language spoken by about 5,000 people in 1998 in the Kavieng District of New Ireland Province, Papua New Guinea.

Laxudumau, spoken in the village of Lakudumau, is transitional to Nalik.

== Phonology ==
=== Consonants ===
Consonant phonemes
	Labial	Alveolar	Velar	Uvular
Nasal	m	n	ŋ	
Plosive	p b	t d	g	q
Fricative	ɸ β	s	ɣ	
Trill		r		
Lateral		l		

Kara contains fourteen consonants. Single consonants are found within the head of a word, intervocalically between two vowels, finally and in sequences of less than two words medially. Voiceless consonants /p, t, q, ɸ, s/ create a cluster on the second consonant. Voiced consonants /b, d, g, β, ɣ/ appear initially and intervocally. They appear as the second consonant of a cluster. An example would be [βalβal] 'tree sap'. It is notable that different dialects change the use of consonants. West Kara replaces /s/ with /z/ anytime it would proceed a vowel, and interpolate /ɸ/ with [h] before a vowel and [ʔ] at the end of a word.

Examples of Consonants Used
Consonant	Head (Initial)	Intervocalic	Final
p	[pʰabʊŋ] 'clan'	[ipʰʊl] 'surprise'	[lɛp] 'wave'
t	[tʰuɸ] 'sugar cane'	[xutʰat] 'crayfish'	[ɸat] 'stone'
q	[qʰɔɾ] 'raven'	[xɔqʰɔɸ] 'head cloth'	[laq] 'go up'
g	[gis] 'sick'	[gogon] 'sweep'	does not occur

=== Vowels ===
Vowel phones
	Front	Central	Back
Close	i		u
Near-Close	ɪ		ʊ
Close-Mid	e		o
Open-Mid	ɛ	ɘ	ɔ
Open		a	

Kara contains ten vowels. Relative to their position in the IPA vowel chart, the vowels in Kara tend to contrast each other throughout the language. Central vowels [a] and [ə] contrast in both open and closed syllables. Example:

- [pʰa] 'east', [pʰɘ-] 'instrument/accompany'

Mid-vowels [e] and [ɛ], and [o] and [ɔ] are complementary to each other in their respective pairs. Each pair occurs in open syllables, a syllable consisting of an onset and nucleus but no coda.

- [pʰe] 'locative' and [pʰɜt] 'betray', compared to [pʰo] 'mute' and [ɸɔt] 'type of fishing'

Higher vowels [i] and [ɪ], and [u] and [ʊ] contrast in closed syllables, a syllable consisting of an onset, nucleus, and coda.

- [pʰit] 'break (a rope)' and [pʰɪt] 'hit (inanimate object)'
- [pʰut] 'husk' and [pʰʊt] 'erupt/explode'

=== Stress ===
Kara has an unusual occurrence of stress, or relative emphasis of syllables. Stress in Kara occurs on any syllable in a word, but follows a system of rules that allow placement of stress in an ordered system in all words that contain two syllables or more. However, syllables stemmed from prefixes are never stressed regardless of the ordered system. Stress is determined by three factors: vowel quality, syllable closure, and position in the word, with vowel quality being the most important factor.

==== Syllables and stress ====
A syllable with a nucleus of /a/ receives primary stress regardless of its position in the word.

- [′qʰa.pʰɪs] 'plant'
- ['qʰaq.sa.,ɣɘ] 'one-leg'
- [nɛ.'tʰa.ɾɘ] 'we'

A word with more than one syllable and a nucleus of /a/ has the stress fall on the last syllable..

- [,ɾʊɾu.βeəq] 'muddy'

A word with neither a syllable with a nucleus of /a/ or a closed syllable has the stress fall on the initial syllable.

- ['ja.mu] 'axe'

== Grammar ==
Kara follows a verb–subject–object word order, and uses reduplication for creation of more complex sentences. The language determines that body parts and kinship terms must be identified as belonging to someone which make it possible for inalienable possession.

=== Verbs ===
Verbs in Kara are used transitively, meaning that the verbs in Kara span a spectrum that ultimately determines how speaking of the language occurs between an object and that verb. Transitivity of verbs is used to also determine whether the spoken language is between two people actively who are actively speakers, rather than a speaker and a listener. For example: the verb [kuus] 'say' has an initiator but no one to actively speak to.

=== Reduplication ===
Reduplication occurs in words with an initial plosive consonant. The reduplicated consonant created is said fricatively within the same articulation of the word.

- [βipʰɪs] 'secured/confined' (cf. [pʰɪs] 'tie')
- [βipʰrt] 'striking' (cf. [pʰrt] 'hit')
- [βibɪt] 'lying' (cf. [bɪt] 'lie')
- [ɣuqʰus] 'talking' (cf. [qʰus] 'say')

=== Inalienable possession ===
Inalienable suffixes
Stem	1s poss	2s poss	3s poss	Meaning
[nasə]	[nasaq]	[nasam]	[nasənə]	'wife'
[mɘtʰɘ]	[mɘtʰaq]	[mɘtʰam]	[mətʰɘnɘ]	'eye'
[βəsa]	[βɘsaq]	[βɘsam]	[βəsanə]	'sibling'
[mi]	[mieq]	[mim]	[minə]	'back'
[ɣu]	[ɣuəq]	[ɣum]	[ɣunɘ]	'stomach'

Note that most of the second-person forms do not contain [ə]; this occurs because sequences such as /iɘ, uɘ, oɘ, eə/ only occur before /ɣ/ or /q/. Since /ɘ/ is the second vowel in a sequence, /ə/ is either combined or deleted before any consonant besides /ɣ/ and /q/.

== Bibliography ==
- Schlie, Perry (1989). "Breaking in on the Kara net". In Karl Franklin (ed.). Studies in Componential Analysis. Ukarumpa: SIL. pp. 73–82.
- Schlie, Perry (1996). "Kara Organised Phonology Data" (PDF). SIL International. Archived from the original (PDF) on 2007-11-13.
- Schlie, Perry; Schlie, Virginia (1993). "A Kara phonology". In John M. Clifton (ed.). Phonologies of Austronesian languages 2. Ukarumpa: SIL. pp. 99–130.
- Schlie, Virginia (1989). "Ways and means of communication in Kara". In Karl Franklin (ed.). Studies in Componential Analysis. Ukarumpa: SIL. pp. 39–46.
- Dryer, Matthew S. (2013). A Grammatical Description of Kara-Lemakot (PDF). Canberra, ACT: Australian National University. hdl:1885/10703. ISBN 9781922185099. Archived from the original (PDF) on 2014-01-26.
