= Tok Pisin =

English creole spoken in Papua New Guinea

- (New Guinea) Pidgin
- Tok Pisin
- Pronunciation: [tok pisin]
- Native to: Papua New Guinea
- Region: New Guinea
- Native speakers: 130,000 (2004–2016); L2 speakers: 4,000,000
- Language family: English Creole: Pacific; Melanesian Pidgin; Tok Pisin
- Writing system: Latin script (Tok Pisin alphabet); Pidgin Braille

Official status
- Official language in: Papua New Guinea

Language codes
- ISO 639-2: tpi
- ISO 639-3: tpi
- Glottolog: tokp1240
- Linguasphere: 52-ABB-cc

A Tok Pisin speaker, recorded in Taiwan

Tok Pisin (English: /tɒk ˈpɪsɪn/ TOK PIH-sin, /tɔːk, -zɪn/ tawk, -zin; Tok Pisin: [tok pisin]) is an English creole language spoken throughout Papua New Guinea. It is one of the official languages of Papua New Guinea and the most widely used language in the country. In parts of the southern provinces of Western, Gulf, Central, Oro, and Milne Bay, the use of Tok Pisin has a shorter history and is less universal, especially among older people.

Between five and six million people use Tok Pisin to some degree, though not all speak it fluently. Many now learn it as a first language, in particular the children of parents or grandparents who originally spoke different languages (for example, a mother from Madang and a father from Rabaul). Urban families in particular, and those of police and defence force members, often communicate among themselves in Tok Pisin, either never gaining fluency in a local language (tok ples) or learning a local language as a second (or third) language after Tok Pisin (and possibly English). Over the decades, Tok Pisin has increasingly overtaken Hiri Motu as the dominant lingua franca among town-dwellers. Perhaps one million people now use Tok Pisin as a primary language. Tok Pisin is slowly "crowding out" other languages of Papua New Guinea.

== Name ==
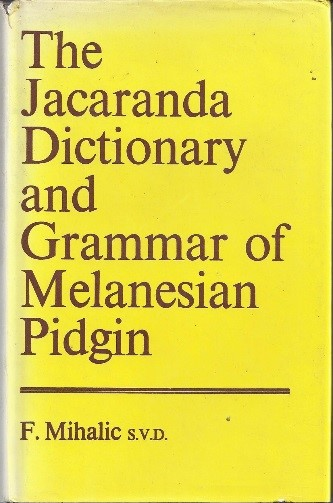
A 1971 reference book on Tok Pisin (referring to the language as Melanesian Pidgin)

Tok originates from English talk, but has a wider application, also meaning 'word, speech, language'. Pisin derives from the English word pidgin; the latter, in turn, may originate in the word business, due to the typical development and use of pidgins as inter-ethnic trade languages.

While Tok Pisin's name in the language is Tok Pisin, it is also called "New Guinea Pidgin" in English. Papua New Guinean anglophones often call Tok Pisin "Pidgin" when speaking English. (Note: The published court reports of Papua New Guinea refer to Tok Pisin as "Pidgin": see for example Schubert v The State [1979] PNGLR 66.) This usage of "Pidgin" (with capital P) differs from the term pidgin (language) as used in linguistics. In spite of its name, Tok Pisin is not a pidgin in the latter sense, because it has become a first language for many people (rather than simply a lingua franca to facilitate communication with speakers of other languages). As such, it is considered a creole in linguistic terminology. (Note: See the Glottolog entry for Tok Pisin (itself evidence that the linguistic community considers it a language in its own right, and prefers to name it Tok Pisin), as well as numerous references therein.)

== Classification ==
The Tok Pisin language is a result of Pacific Islanders intermixing. When colonial authorities forced people speaking numerous different languages to work on plantations in Queensland and various islands during blackbirding, the labourers began to develop a pidgin drawing vocabulary primarily from English, but also from German, Malay, Portuguese, and their own Austronesian languages (perhaps especially Kuanua, that of the Tolai people of East New Britain).

This English-based pidgin evolved into Tok Pisin in German New Guinea (where the German-based creole Unserdeutsch was also spoken), which became a widely used lingua franca between colonial authorities and the indigenous population. Tok Pisin and the closely related Bislama in Vanuatu and Pijin in the Solomon Islands, which developed in parallel, have traditionally been treated as varieties of a single Melanesian Pidgin English or "Neo-Melanesian" language. The flourishing of the mainly English-based Tok Pisin in German New Guinea (despite the language of the metropolitan power being German) contrasts with Hiri Motu, the lingua franca of Papua, which derived not from English but from Motu, the language of the indigenous people of the Port Moresby area.

Tok Pisin phonology and grammar strongly resembles Bislama and Pijin, but contrasts in several ways. The genitive preposition, derived from English belong, is bilong in Tok Pisin, but blong in Bislama and Pijin. Similarly, the adjectival ending derived from English fellow is -pela in Tok Pisin, but -fala in Bislama and Pijin. Certain phonological changes also occurred differently between Tok Pisin and Bislama.

Phonological Feature	Tok Pisin	Bislama	English origin
Final devoicing	pik [pik]	pig [pig ~ pik]	pig, pork
Reflex of English /æ/	kensa	kansa	cancer
Reflex of English /t͡ʃ/	sia [si.a]	jea [t͡ʃe.a]	chair

== Official status ==
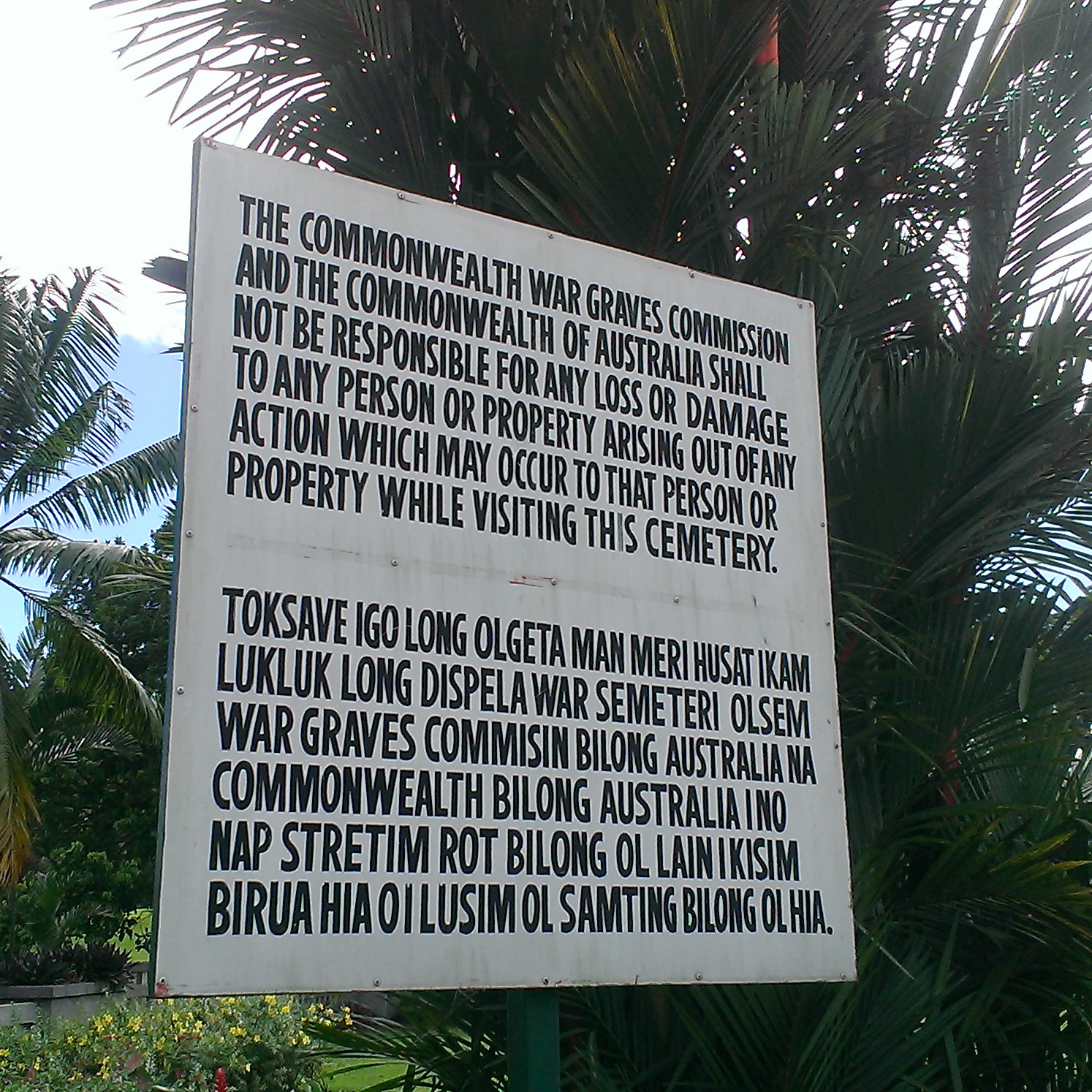
A bilingual sign in English and Tok Pisin, displayed at the Lae War Cemetery (Lae, Papua New Guinea).

Along with English and Hiri Motu, Tok Pisin is one of Papua New Guinea's three official languages. It is frequently the language of debate in the national parliament. Most government documents are produced in English, but public information campaigns are often partially or entirely in Tok Pisin. While English is the main language in the education system, some schools use Tok Pisin in the first three years of elementary education to promote early literacy.

== Regional variations ==
There are considerable variations in vocabulary and grammar in various parts of Papua New Guinea, with distinct dialects in the New Guinea Highlands, the north coast of Papua New Guinea, and islands outside of New Guinea. For example, Pidgin speakers from Finschhafen speak rather quickly and often have difficulty making themselves understood elsewhere. The variant spoken on Bougainville and Buka is moderately distinct from that of New Ireland and East New Britain but is much closer to that than it is to the Pijin spoken in the rest of the Solomon Islands.

There are 4 sociolects of Tok Pisin:

1. Tok Bus (meaning "talk of the remote areas") or Tok Kanaka (meaning "talk of the people of the remote areas")
2. Tok Bilong Asples (meaning "language of the villages"), the traditional rural Tok Pisin
3. Tok Skul (meaning "talk of the schools") or Tok Bilong Taun (meaning "talk of the Towns"), the urban Tok Pisin
4. Tok Masta (meaning "language of the masters"), unsystematically simplified English with some Tok Pisin words

== Orthography ==
Tok Pisin's current alphabet has 21 letters, five of which are vowels, and four digraphs. The letters are (vowels in italics):

a, b, d, e, f, g, h, i, k, l, m, n, o, p, r, s, t, u, v, w, y

Three of the digraphs, ⟨ai⟩, ⟨au⟩, and ⟨oi⟩, denote diphthongs; the fourth, ⟨ng⟩, is used for both /ŋ/ and /ŋɡ/.

Prior to the creation of the current orthography by the colonial Department of Education in 1955 to increase literacy, colonial administrators spelled Tok Pisin etymologically, spelling each Tok Pisin word identically to its original spelling in the language that the word derived from. However, this spelling system did not have a standardized spelling of certain terms and often made incorrect assumptions about the etymology of certain words; older publications spelled Tok Pisin i as "he" when the word actually originates from English is or a term in an unknown Austronesian language.

For example, a 1953 article in an Australian newspaper quotes a Papua New Guinean man as saying:

Before, me fellow school long other fella mission, tasol imi hidim half talk, now Seven Day imi kamapim altogether talk. Me fellow please too much you go along house sick bilong Seven Day now kisim good fellow story now schoolim me fellow. Seven Day Mission something true.

In current Tok Pisin orthography, this paragraph would be spelled as:

Bipo, mipela skul long narapela misin, tasol i haitim hap tok, nau Sevin De i kamapim olgeta tok. Mipela plis tumas yu go long haus sik bilong Sevin De nau kisim gutpela stori nau skulim mipela. Sevin De Misin i samting tru.

"In the past, I belonged another church, but it hid parts of the truth; the Seventh Day Adventist church reveals the whole truth. We often go to the Seventh Day Adventist hospital to get good information. The Seventh Day Adventist church is the true church."

== Phonology ==
Tok Pisin has a smaller number of phonemes than its lexifier language, English. It has around 24 core phonemes: 5 vowels and around 19 consonants. This varies with the local substrate languages and the speaker's level of education. More educated speakers, and/or those where the substrate language(s) have larger phoneme inventories, may have as many as 10 distinct vowels.

Nasal plus plosive offsets lose the plosive element in Tok Pisin; e.g., English hand becomes Tok Pisin han. Furthermore, voiced plosives become voiceless at the ends of words, so that English pig is rendered as pik in Tok Pisin.

=== Consonants ===
Consonant phonemes
		Labial	Coronal	Palatal	Velar	Glottal
Nasal		m	n		ŋ	
Plosive	voiceless	p	t		k	
Plosive	voiced	b	d		ɡ	
Affricate				d̠͡ʒ		
Fricative	voiceless	f	s			h
Fricative	voiced	v				
Approximant		w	l	j		
Rhotic			r			

- Voiced plosives are pronounced by many speakers (especially of Melanesian backgrounds) as prenasalized plosives.
- /t/, /d/, and /l/ can be either dental or alveolar consonants, while /n/ is only alveolar.
- In most Tok Pisin dialects, the phoneme /r/ is pronounced as the alveolar tap or flap, [ɾ]. There can be variation between /r/ and /l/.
- The labiodental fricatives /f v/ may be marginal, with contrastive use present only in heavily Anglicized varieties. The use of /f/ vs. /p/ is variable. There is also variation between /f/ and /v/ in some words, such as faif/faiv 'five'.
- Likewise, there may be marginal use of /ʃ ʒ/.

=== Vowels ===
Tok Pisin has five pure vowels:

Vowel phonemes
	Front	Back
Close	i	u
Mid	e	o
Open	a	

== Grammar ==
The verb has a suffix, -im (< Eng. him) to indicate transitivity (luk, "look"; lukim, "see"). But some verbs, such as kaikai "eat", can be transitive without it. Tense is indicated by the separate words bai (future) (< Eng. by and by) and bin (past) (< Eng. been). The present progressive tense is indicated by the word stap; e.g., Hem kaikai stap "He is eating".

The noun does not indicate number, though pronouns do.

Adjectives usually take the suffix -pela (now often pronounced -pla, though more so for pronouns, and -pela for adjectives; from "fellow") when modifying nouns; an exception is liklik "little". (Note: Liklik can also be used as an adverb meaning "slightly", as in dispela bikpela liklik ston, "this slightly big stone".) It is also found on numerals and determiners:

Tok Pisin: wanpela → Eng. "one"
Tok Pisin: tupela → Eng. "two"
Tok Pisin: dispela boi → Eng. "this bloke"

Pronouns show person, number, and clusivity. The paradigm varies depending on the local languages; dual number is common, while the trial is less so. The largest Tok Pisin pronoun inventory is:

	Singular	Dual	Trial	Plural
1st exclusive	mi (I) < Eng. me	mitupela (he/she and I) < Eng. *me two fellow	mitripela (both of them, and I); Eng. *me three fellow	mipela (all of them, and I); Eng. *me fellow
1st inclusive	–	yumitupela (you and I) < Eng. *you me two fellow	yumitripela (both of you, and I) < Eng. *you me three fellow	yumipela or yumi (all of you, and I) < Eng. *you me fellow or *you me
2nd	yu (thou) < Eng. you	yutupela (you two) < Eng. *you two fellow	yutripela (you three) < Eng. *you three fellow	yupela (you four or more) < Eng. *you fellow
3rd	em (he/she/it) < Eng. him	tupela (they two) < Eng. *two fellow	tripela (they three) < Eng. *three fellow	ol (they four or more) < Eng. all

Reduplication is very common in Tok Pisin. Sometimes it is used as a method of derivation; sometimes words just have it. Some words are distinguished only by reduplication: sip "ship", sipsip "sheep".

There are only two proper prepositions:

- the genitive preposition bilong (etym. < Eng. belong), which is equivalent to "of", "from" and some uses of "for": e.g. Ki bilong yu "your key"; Ol bilong Godons "They are from Gordon's".
- the oblique preposition long (etym. < Eng. along), which is used for various other relations (such as locative or dative): e.g. Mipela i bin go long blekmaket. "We went to the black market".

Some phrases are used as prepositions, such as 'long namel (bilong)', "in the middle of".

Several of these features derive from the common grammatical norms of Austronesian languages, (Note: The language Tolai is often named as having had an important influence on early Tok Pisin.) usually in a simplified form. Other features, such as word order, are closer to English.

Sentences with a 3rd-person subject often put the word i immediately before the verb. This may or may not be written separate from the verb, occasionally written as a prefix. Although the word is thought to be derived from "he" or "is", it is not itself a pronoun or a verb but a grammatical marker used in particular constructions, e.g., Kar i tambu long hia is "car forbidden here", i.e., "no parking".

The term pasin, derived from English fashion, serves as a nominalizer and collectivizer.

Base Term	Meaning of Base Term	Term with Pasin	Meaning of Term with Pasin
antap	on top	pasin antap	arrogance, haughtiness, pride
bikhet	big head	pasin bikhet	apostasy, delinquency, rebellion
birua	enemy	pasin birua	hate
resis	race	pasin resis	competition, rivalry
tumbuna	ancestor	pasin tumbuna	culture

=== Tense and aspect ===
Past tense: marked by bin (< Eng. been):

Tok Pisin: Na praim minista i bin tok olsem.
English: "And the prime minister spoke thus."

Continuative same tense is expressed through: verb + i stap.

Tok Pisin: Em i slip i stap.
English: "He/She is sleeping."

Completive or perfective aspect expressed through the word pinis (< Eng. finish):

Tok Pisin: Em i lusim bot pinis.
English: "He had got out of the boat."

Future is expressed through the word "bai" (< Eng. by and by):

Tok Pisin: Nil nabaut bai i ros.
English: "If you take just any nails that happen to be around, those will rust."

=== Voice ===
Tok Pisin lacks a passive voice; all verb phrases must have a subject.

== Development of Tok Pisin ==
Tok Pisin developed out of regional dialects of the local inhabitants' languages and English, brought into the country when English speakers arrived. Four phases in Tok Pisin's development were laid out by Loreto Todd.

1. Casual contact between English speakers and local people developed a marginal pidgin.
2. Pidgin English was used between the local people. The language expanded from the users' mother tongue.
3. As the interracial contact increased, the vocabulary expanded according to the dominant language.
4. In areas where English was the official language, a depidginization occurred (Todd, 1990).

Tok Pisin is also known as a "mixed" language. This means that it consists of characteristics of different languages. Tok Pisin obtained most of its vocabulary from English (i.e., English is its lexifier). The origin of the syntax is a matter of debate. Edward Wolfers claimed that the syntax is from the substratum languages—the languages of the local peoples. Derek Bickerton's analysis of creoles, on the other hand, claims that the syntax of creoles is imposed on the grammarless pidgin by its first native speakers: the children who grow up exposed to only a pidgin rather than a more developed language such as one of the local languages or English. In this analysis, the original syntax of creoles is in some sense the default grammar humans are born with.

Pidgins are less elaborated than non-Pidgin languages. Their typical characteristics found in Tok Pisin are:

1. A smaller vocabulary which leads to metaphors to supply lexical units:
  - Smaller vocabulary:
    hevi = "heavy", "problem", and "weight"
    klok = "clock" and "heart"
    lain = "ethnicity" and "line"
    vot = "election" (n) and "vote" (v)
  - Metaphors:
    skru bilong han (screw of the arm) = "elbow"
    skru bilong lek (screw of the leg) = "knee" (Just skru almost always indicates the knee. In liturgical contexts, brukim skru is "kneel.")
    gras bilong het (grass of the head) = "hair" (Hall, 1966: 90f) (Most commonly just gras—see note on skru bilong lek above.)
  - Circumlocution:
    nambawan pikinini bilong misis kwin (literally "first child of Mrs Queen") = King Charles III, then known through his relation to the Queen.
2. A reduced grammar: lack of copula, determiners; reduced set of prepositions, and conjunctions
  - In some cases, the English plural form of nouns evolved into singular nouns in Tok Pisin. For example, the Tok Pisin word for "race" is resis, the word for "coconut" is kokonas, and the word for "tooth" is tit.
3. Less differentiated phonology: [p] and [f] are not distinguished in Tok Pisin (they are in free variation). The sibilants /s/, /z/, /ʃ/, /ʒ/, /tʃ/, and /dʒ/ are also not distinguished.
  All of the English words fish, peach, feast, piss, and peace would have been realised in Tok Pisin as pis. In fact, the Tok Pisin pis means "fish" (and usually has a sound closer to [ɪ], almost like the English word piss). English piss was reduplicated to keep it distinct: thus pispis means "urine" or "to urinate".
  Likewise, sip in Tok Pisin could have represented English ship, jib, jeep, sieve, sheep, or chief. In fact, it means "ship".

=== Circumlocution and synonyms ===
The use of circumlocutions or periphrases to express complex concepts is a familiar process in pidgin languages. Thus for Tok Pisin, consider bel i no laikim kaikai "food intolerance" (literally "the belly does not like the food"). In other cases, Tok Pisin speakers borrow words from other languages (most often English) to express unfamiliar concepts.

This use of circumlocutions on the one hand, and borrowing of learned English words on the other, has led to less frequently used words often possessing one or two synonyms. The use of English derived terms to replace lengthy circumlocutions has become more common as Tok Pisin speakers are more exposed to English in their daily life.

English term	Tok Pisin term derived from English	Tok Pisin circumlocution
antibiotic	antibaiotik	marasin bilong kilim ol binatang (medicine for killing germs)
bank	beng	haus moni (money building)
culture	kalsa	pasin tumbuna (practice of ancestors)
diabetes	daiabitis	sik suga (sugar disease)
diarrhea	dairia	pekpek wara (feces water)
disability	disabiliti	bagarap long bodi / long skin (malfunction in the body / under the skin)
disability	disabiliti	hevi long bodi / long skin (problem in the body / under the skin)
discrimination	diskriminesen	daunim narapela (lowering another person)
discrimination	diskriminesen	pasin bilong bagarapim narapela man o meri (practice of harming another man or woman)
heater	hita	masin bilong hatim rum (machine for heating the room)
sexually transmitted disease	seksueli transmitet disis	sik bilong koap (disease from sex)
toothpaste	kolget (from the brand name Colgate)	marasin bilong klinim tit (medicine for cleaning the teeth)

Several circumlocutions have fallen out of use because they have inaccurate or offensive origins. For example, the older terms binatang nogut and sik nogut (translating to "bad germ" and "bad disease") for HIV and AIDS have fallen out of use because they falsely imply that all people with the disease engaged in behaviors considered by many Papua New Guineans to be immoral, such as premarital sexual intercourse and drug use. In reality, many people contract HIV prenatally or through faulty blood transfusions.

Two commonly-cited examples of circumlocutions relate to the piano and the helicopter. The following Tok Pisin "names" for the piano, the first four displayed in the older orthography with the current orthography in italicized parentheses and a literal translation in quotes, were recorded by early 20th-century writers:

- big fellow box spose whiteman fight him he cry too much (bikpela bokis sapos waitman i paitim i krai tumas) "large box that cries if the white man hits it" (1902)
- box belong cry (bokis bilong krai) "screaming box" (1902)
- big fellow bokkes, suppose missis he fight him, he cry too much (bikpela bokis, sapos misis i paitim, i krai tumas) "large box that cries if the white woman hits it" (1911)
- bigfela bokis yu fait-im i krai (bikpela bokis yu paitim i krai) "large box that cries when you hit it" (1921)
- bikpela bokis bilong krai taim yu paitim na kikim em "large box that cries when you hit and kick it" (1969)

Linguists observe that these circumlocutions are unstable ad hoc descriptions of an object, rather than set "words" or names. The situation is comparable to a Tok Pisin-English dictionary's definition of a Tok Pisin word with no English equivalent, such as milis being defined as "coconut milk made from shedding coconut meat in the water of a ripe nut"; nobody would suggest that this lengthy expression is the "English name" for this drink.

It is often claimed that mixmaster bilong Jesus Christ (miksmasta bilong Jisas Krais), an adposition translating to Jesus Christ's Mixmaster (the Sunbeam Mixmaster was an electric food processor popular in the United States and Australia), is the Tok Pisin word for "helicopter." This factoid appeared as early as 1965 and still circulates online today. However, the phrase appears to be a fabrication by expatriates working in New Guinea. Linguists point out that helicopters, introduced to New Guinea by oil search teams, would have been far more familiar to early Tok Pisin speakers than electric food processors.

== Vocabulary ==
Many words in the Tok Pisin language are derived from English (with Australian influences), indigenous Melanesian languages, and German (part of the country was under German rule until 1919). Some examples:

- as = "bottom", "cause", "beginning" (from ass/arse). As ples bilong em = "his birthplace". As bilong diwai = "the stump of a tree".
- bagarap(im) = "broken", "to break down" (from bugger up). The word is commonly used, with no vulgar undertone, in Tok Pisin and even in Papua New Guinea English.
  - bagarap olgeta = "completely broken"
- balus = "bird" or more specifically a pigeon or dove (an Austronesian loan word); by extension "aeroplane"
- belhat = "angry" (lit. 'belly hot')
- belo = "bell", as in belo bilong lotu = "church bell". By extension "lunch" or "midday break" (from the bell rung to summon diners to the table). A fanciful derivation has been suggested from the "bellows" of horns used by businesses to indicate the beginning of the lunch hour, but this seems less likely than the straightforward derivation.
- bensin = "petrol/gasoline" (from German Benzin)
- bilong wanem? = "why?"
- braun = "brown"
- buai = "betelnut"
- bubu = "grandparent", any elderly relation; also "grandchild". Possibly from Hiri Motu, where it is a familiar form of "tubu", as in "tubuna" or "tubugu".
- didiman = "male agricultural worker", derived from the surname of a colonial officer who worked in this profession
- didimeri = "female agricultural worker"; the syllable man was reanalyzed as Tok Pisin man (from English man), giving rise to the corresponding term didimeri by combining the first two syllables with Tok Pisin meri ("woman", from English Mary)
- diwai = "tree", "wood", "plant", "stick", etc.
- gat bel = "pregnant" (lit. 'has belly'; pasin bilong givim bel = "fertility")
- gras = "hair" (from grass)
- gude = "hello" (from g'day)
- gut = "good"
- (h)amamas = "happy"
- hap = a piece of, as in hap diwai = a piece of wood (from half)
  - hapsait = "the other side" (from half side)
  - hap ret = "purple" (from half red)
- haus = "house" or "building" (from German Haus and/or English house)
  - hausboi/hausmeri = "a male/female domestic servant"; haus boi can also mean "servants quarters"
  - haus kaikai = restaurant ("house [of] food")
  - haus moni = "bank" ("house [of] money")
  - haus sik = "hospital" ("house [of] sick")
  - haus dok sik = "animal hospital" ("house [of] dog sick")
  - haus karai = "place of mourning" ("house [of] cry")
  - sit haus (vulgar) = "toilet" ("shit house"), also:
    - liklik haus = "toilet"
    - smol haus = "toilet/bathroom" ("small house")
  - haus tambaran = "traditional Sepik-region house with artifacts of ancestors or for honoring ancestors; tambaran means "ancestor spirit" or "ghost"
- hevi = "heavy", "problem". Em i gat bigpela hevi = "he has a big problem".
- hukim pis = "catch fish" (from hook)
- kaikai = "food", "eat", "to bite" (Austronesian loan word)
  - kaikai bilong moningtaim = "breakfast"
  - kaikai bilong nait = "dinner/supper"
- kakaruk = "chicken" (probably onomatapoetic, from the crowing of the rooster)
- kamap = "arrive", "become" (from come up)
- kisim = "get", "take" (from get them)
- lotu = "church", "worship" from Fijian, but sometimes sios is used for "church"
- magani = "wallaby"
  - bikpela magani = "kangaroo" ("big wallaby")
- mangi/manki = "small boy"; by extension, "young man" (probably from the English jocular/affectionate usage monkey, applied to mischievous children, although a derivation from the German Männchen, meaning "little man", has also been suggested)
- manmeri = "people" (from man "man" and meri "woman")
- maski = "it doesn't matter", "don't worry about it" (probably from German macht nichts = "it doesn't matter")
- maus gras = "moustache" ("mouth grass")
- meri = "woman" (from the English name Mary); also "female", e.g., bulmakau meri (lit. 'bull-cow female') = cow.
- olgeta = "all" (from all together)
- olsem wanem = "what?", "what's going on?" (literally "like what"?); sometimes used as an informal greeting, similar to what's up? in English
- palopa – homosexual man or transgender woman
- pisin = "bird" (from pigeon). (The homophony of this word with the name of the language has led to a limited association between the two; Mian speakers, for example, refer to Tok Pisin as wan weng, literally "bird language".)
- pasim = "close", "lock" (from fasten)
  - pasim maus = "shut up", "be quiet", i.e. yu pasim maus, literally "you close mouth" = "shut up!"
- paul = "wrong", "confused", i.e. em i paul = "he is confused" (from English foul)
- pikinini = "child", ultimately from Portuguese-influenced Lingua franca; cf. English pickaninny
- raskol = "thief, criminal" (from rascal)
- raus, rausim (rausim is the transitive form) = "get out, throw out, remove" (from German raus meaning "out")
- rokrok = "frog" (probably onomatopoeic)
- sapos = "if" (from suppose)
- save = "know", "to do habitually" (ultimately from Portuguese-influenced Lingua franca, cf. English savvy)
- sit = "remnant" (from shit)
- solwara = "ocean" (from salt water)
- sop = "soap"; also
  - sop bilong tut = "toothpaste"
  - sop bilong gras = "shampoo"
- stap = "stay", "be (somewhere)", "live" (from stop)
- susa = "sister", nowadays very commonly supplanted by sista. Some Tok Pisin speakers use susa for a sibling of the opposite gender, while a sibling of the same gender as the speaker is a b(a)rata.
- susu = "milk, breasts" (from Malay susu)
- tambu = "forbidden", but also "in-laws" (mother-in-law, brother-in-law, etc.) and other relatives whom one is forbidden to speak to, or mention the name of, in some PNG customs (from tabu or tambu in various Austronesian languages, the origin of Eng. taboo)
- tasol = "only, just"; "but" (from that's all)
- Tok Inglis = "English language"
- wanpela = "one", "a" (indefinite article).

== Sample text ==
Article 1 of the Universal Declaration of Human Rights in Tok Pisin:

Yumi olgeta mama karim umi long stap fri na wankain long wei yumi lukim i gutpela na strepela tru. Yumi olgeta igat ting ting bilong wanem samting i rait na rong na mipela olgeta i mas mekim gutpela pasin long ol narapela long tingting bilong brata susa.

Article 1 of the Universal Declaration of Human Rights in English:

All human beings are born free and equal in dignity and rights. They are endowed with reason and conscience and should act towards one another in a spirit of brotherhood.
