= Tigak language =

Austronesian language spoken in Papua New Guinea

Tigak
- Region: New Ireland Province, Papua New Guinea
- Native speakers: (6,000 cited 1991)
- Language family: Austronesian: Malayo-Polynesian; Oceanic; Western; Meso-Melanesian; (New Ireland); Tungag–Nalik; Tigak
- Writing system: Latin

Language codes
- ISO 639-3: tgc
- Glottolog: tiga1245

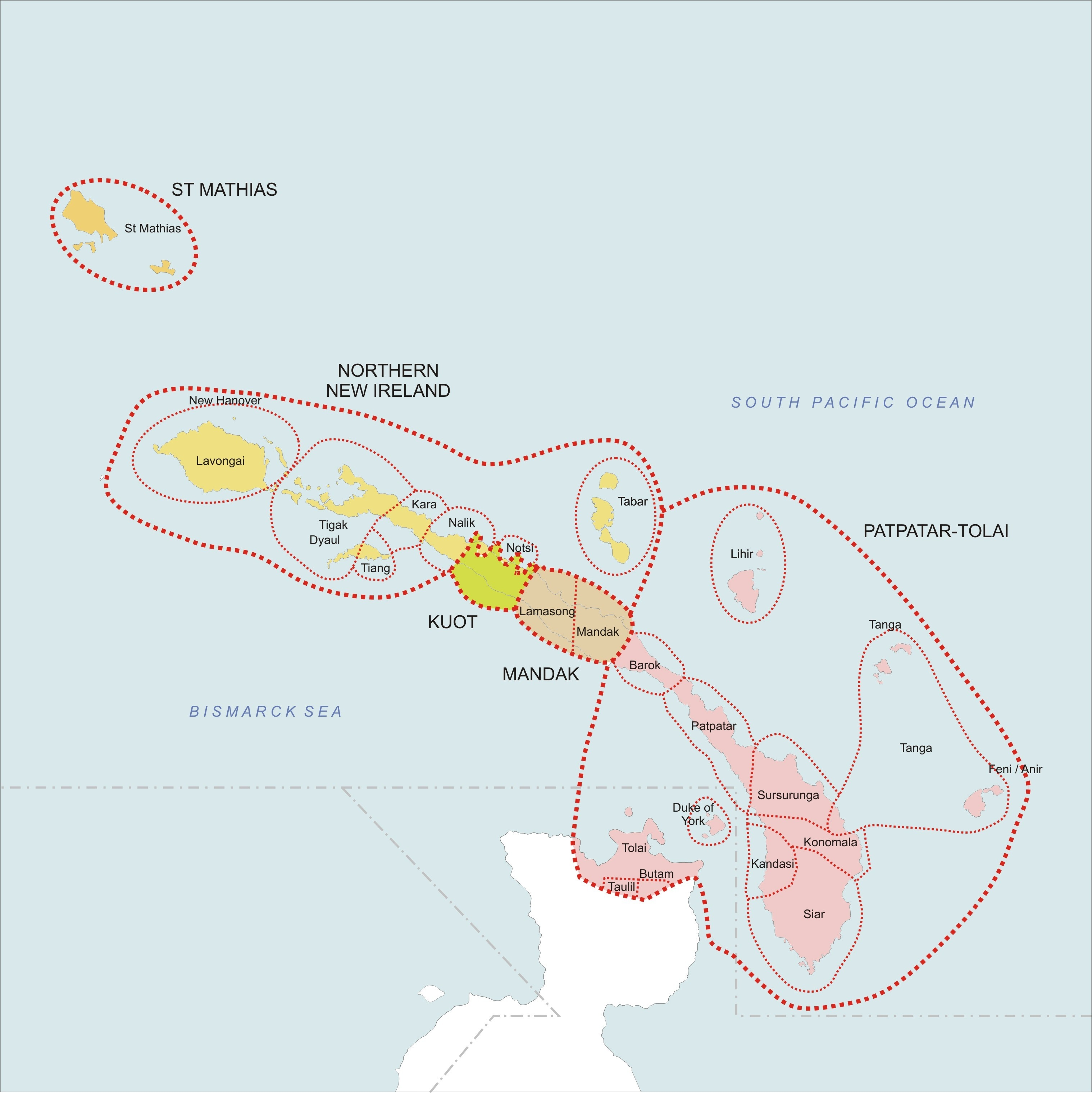
Languages of the New Ireland languages group

Tigak (or Omo) is an Austronesian language spoken by about 6,000 people (in 1991) in the Kavieng District of New Ireland Province, Papua New Guinea.

The Tigak language area includes the provincial capital, Kavieng.

== Phonology ==
Phoneme inventory of the Tigak language:

Consonant sounds
		Labial	Alveolar	Velar
Nasal		m	n	ŋ
Plosive	voiceless	p	t	k
Plosive	voiced	b		g
Rhotic			r	
Fricative	median	β	s	
Fricative	lateral		ɮ	

/r/ can also be realized as [ɾ] allophonically. Both /k, ɡ/ are back-released as [k̠, ɡ̠].

Vowel sounds
	Front	Central	Back
High	i		u
Mid	e		ɔ
Low		a	

Phoneme	Allophones
/i/	[i], [ɪ], [y]
/e/	[e], [ɛ]
/a/	[ʌ], [a]

Two vowels /i u/ in word-initial form can also be released as consonantal allophones [w j].
