= Patpatar language =

Austronesian language

Patpatar
- Gelik
- Native to: Papua New Guinea
- Region: New Ireland Province
- Native speakers: (7,000 cited 1998)
- Language family: Austronesian: Malayo-Polynesian; Oceanic; Western; Meso-Melanesian; (St George linkage); Patpatar–Tolai; Patpatar
- Dialects: Pala; Sokirik

Language codes
- ISO 639-3: gfk
- Glottolog: patp1243

Patpatar, or Gelik, is an Austronesian language spoken in New Ireland Province in Papua New Guinea.

== Phonology ==
Phonology of the Patpatar language:

Consonant sounds
	Labial	Alveolar	Dorsal	Glottal
Nasal	m	n	ŋ	
Plosive	p b	t d	k g	
Fricative		s		h
Rhotic		r		
Lateral		l		
Glide	w		(j)	

Vowel sounds
	Front	Back
High	i	u
Mid	e	o
Low	a	
