= Nalik language =

Austronesian language spoken in Papua New Guinea

Nalik
- Region: New Ireland Province, Papua New Guinea
- Native speakers: (5,140 cited 1990 census)
- Language family: Austronesian: Malayo-Polynesian; Oceanic; Western; Meso-Melanesian; (New Ireland); Tungag–Nalik; Nalik
- Writing system: Latin script

Language codes
- ISO 639-3: nal
- Glottolog: nali1244

The Nalik language is spoken by 5,000 or so people, based in 17 villages in Kavieng District, New Ireland, Papua New Guinea. It is an Austronesian language and member of the New Ireland group of languages with a subject–verb–object (SVO) phrase structure. New Ireland languages are among the first Papua New Guinea languages recorded by Westerners.

Laxudumau, spoken in the village of Lakudumau, is transitional to Kara, but is not intelligible to speakers of Nalik.

== Speakers ==
Speakers of Nalik reside in a series of villages in northern central New Ireland. The Nalik speaking region is an approximately 30-kilometer (19 mi)-long band of the island that spans approximately 10 kilometers (6.2 mi) wide and is flanked on its north by the Kara-speaking region and to its south by speakers of Kuot, the only non-Austronesian language on New Ireland.

In the past, Lugagon, Fesoa, and Fessoa have been used to reference Nalik, which are all names of villages in the region.

== Phonology ==
=== Consonants ===
A Nalik phonology analysis was developed by Clive H. Beaumont.

Consonant phonemes
| | Labial | Alveolar | Velar | Glottal |
|---|---|---|---|---|
| Stop | p b | t d | k g | ʔ |
| Fricative | f β | s z | ɣ | |
| Nasal | m | n | ŋ (ng) | |
| Tap/Flap | | ɾ | | |
| Lateral | | l | | |
| Semivowel | w | | j | |

| | Front | Central | Back |
|---|---|---|---|
| High | i | | u |
| Mid | e | | o |
| Low | | a | |
| Diphthong | | ai oi au | |

== Grammar ==
=== Nalik consonant system ===
In West Coast and Southern East Coast dialects and when preceded by vowels, /p/ and /k/, two non-coronal voiceless stops, are transformed into fricatives. Additionally, the voiceless fricatives become voiced.

When immediately preceded by a vowel the following consonants change their voicing:

/f/ and /p/ become [β] (written as v)

/s/ becomes [z]

/k/ becomes [ɣ] (written as x)

The following are examples of these characteristics:

| Ga vaan-paan | |
| 'I always go' | |
| a mun faal | a vaal |
| the houses | the house |
| a buk sina | a yai zina |
| his book | his tree |
| a mun kulau | a xulau |
| the youths | the youth (singular) |
| Ga rain | Ga rabung tain |
| I see | I saw |

=== Nouns ===
Nouns in Nalik are categorized as being uncountable or countable nouns. Nouns can be part of a noun phrase or can be an independent subject referenced in a verbal complex. When used as subjects, some uncountable nouns are co-referential with plural subject markers; however, those are the exceptions and are usually marked with singular subject markers. With uncountable nouns, numerical markers cannot be used. Countable nouns, however, can be singular or plural and can be modified by numerical markers.

=== Personal pronouns ===
| person | singular | non-singular |
|---|---|---|
| first | ni | di (inclusive) maam (exclusive) |
| second | nu | nim |
| third | naan | na(a)nde, na(a)ndi, na(a)nda |

Variations in the third person non-singular pronouns are attributed to rapid speech and regional variants. In rapid speech naande often becomes nande. In the Northern Eastern Coast naande is the variant used. In the South East Coast naandi is the variant used. Naanda is used primarily by younger speakers from all areas.

Personal pronouns can notably be utilized in the same way as related nouns such as 'a woman' (a ravin) being replaced with 'she' (naan).

- A raivin ka na wut. ('The woman will come.')
- Naan ka na wut. ('She will come.')

=== Numbers ===
The Nalik counting system is reflective of using one's hand to count and indicative of the style in which they do so. They begin with an open palm and bring individual fingers down per digit counted and the action of doing so is shown in their counting system. As such, the Nalik counting system contains elements of a base-five counting system; however, when proceeding past ten, the counting system uses elements of base ten.

The word for the number five, kavitmit, can be analyzed as the phrase ka vit mit: ka being a third-person indicator, vit being a negation particle, and mit meaning 'hand'. It can, therefore, be translated to 'no hand' as all fingers have been lowered.

The numbers six through nine are also representative of this pattern. In these numbers, the phrase describes the act of lowering additional fingers.

Past ten, the counting system starts to use combinations of ten in multiples of a number one to nine. Higher numbers in the hundreds use "ten squared" as a base.

Nalik Number System
| Number | Word | | Number | Phrase | Meaning |
|---|---|---|---|---|---|
| 1 | azaxei | | 10 | sanaflu | |
| 2 | uru | | 20 | sanaflu vara uru(a) | 10 x 2 |
| 3 | orol | | 30 | sanaflu vara orol | 10 x 3 |
| 4 | orolavaat | | 40 | (ka-)sanaflu vara lavaat | 10 x 4 |
| 5 | kavitmit | Meaning | 50 | kazanaflu va vitmit | 10 x 5 |
| 6 | ka-vizik-saxei | it goes down-one | 60 | kazanaflu va viziksaxei | 10 x (5+1) |
| 7 | ka-vizik-uru(a) | it goes down-two | 70 | kazanaflu va vizikuru | 10 x (5+2) |
| 8 | ka-vizik-tal | it goes down-three | 80 | kazanaflu va viziktal | 10 x (5+3) |
| 9 | ka-vizik-faat | it goes down-four | 90 | kazanaflu va vizik faat | 10 x (5+4) |
| | | | 100 | kazanaflu vara zuai | 10 x 10 |

=== Wh-questions ===
Interrogatives in Nalik occur in the same position as adverbs, prepositional phrases, and nouns, and bear the same grammatical relations. Several interrogatives are built off the base word ze, meaning 'what'.

Wh-question words
| a ze | what |
| a ze + modifying NP | which |
| a zaa xo + saait 'also' | why (rhetorical) |
| kun a ze | why |
| pan a ze | with what, how, why |
| pan ko ze | why |
| faa | where |
| ang faa | which |
| lasang | when |
| nis | who |
| zis | whose |
| sa(a) | how |
| usfa | how many, how much |

== Word order ==
The Nalik language features an SVO sentence structure that is common to the languages of the New Ireland–Tolai languages.

Example sentences
| | Translation |
|---|---|
| A nalik ka lis a baxot sin a das-na | The boy is giving/sending the money to his brother |
| Ka lis sin a das-na. | He's giving/sending (it) to his brother. |
| A nalik ka na lis a baxot sin a das-na l-a fotnait l-a xor. | The boy will give some money to his brother next payday. |

== Bibliography ==
- Volker, Dr. Craig (1998). The Nalik Language of New Ireland, Papua New Guinea. Peter Lang. ISBN 0-8204-3673-9.
