= Allied Gold =

Allied Gold Mining PLC
- Type: Public
- Traded as: LSE: ALD; ASX:ALD; TSX: ALD
- Industry: Resources
- Fate: Acquired by St Barbara
- Headquarters: Milton, Queensland, Australia
- Area served: Pacific Rim
- Key people: Mark V Caruso (Executive Chairman)
- Products: Gold, Silver
- Revenue: ▼ A$67,555,369 (2010)
- Net income: ▲ A$10,228,815 (2010)
- Total assets: ▲ A$431,658,286 (2010)
- Website: alliedgold.com.au

Allied Gold Mining PLC was an Australian-based Pacific Rim gold producer with gold production, exploration and development projects in Papua New Guinea and the Solomon Islands.

The company ceased to exist following a merger with St Barbara in 2012.

== History ==
The company dates back to 2003 when it took an interest in the original owner of the gold mining project on Simberi Island.

== Operations ==
=== Simberi, Papua New Guinea ===
Allied Gold operates an open pit gold (and silver) mine on Simberi Island, the northernmost island of the Tabar Group, in the New Ireland Province of eastern Papua New Guinea. The mine is wholly owned and operated by Allied Gold. Gold production started in February 2008. Seven gold deposits have been defined in mining lease 136 (ML 136), which covers the central and eastern portion of Simberi Island, and other prospects have been identified. As of June 2009, Allied reported that the total resources were 4.7 million ounces (Moz) gold: oxide gold resources of 1.4 Moz and sulphide gold resources of 3.3 Moz together with 10.2 Moz silver. Ore is delivered to the processing facilities on the eastern coast near Pigiput Bay by aerial conveyor. The process plant is a conventional carbon-in-leach (CIL) gold process plant capable of treating 2.2 million tonnes of ore per year. Production for the 2008 calendar year was 75,267 ounces (2,133,800 grams).

=== Gold Ridge, Solomon Islands ===
In 2009, Allied Gold acquired the Australian listed Solomons Gold company and its Gold Ridge project on Guadalcanal Island in the Solomon Islands in 2009. A refurbishment has been completed with the first gold being poured in March 2011 and commissioning completing in June 2011. Gold Ridge is expected to produce 100,000 - 110,000 ounces during 2012.

=== Exploration ===
Allied is carrying out exploration programmes on Tabar Island and Tatau Island south of Simberi in exploration license 609 (EL 609), which covers all of the Tabar Group outside of licence ML 136. A regional exploration programme around Gold Ridge is ongoing.
