= Transport in Papua New Guinea =

Overview of the transport system in Papua New Guinea

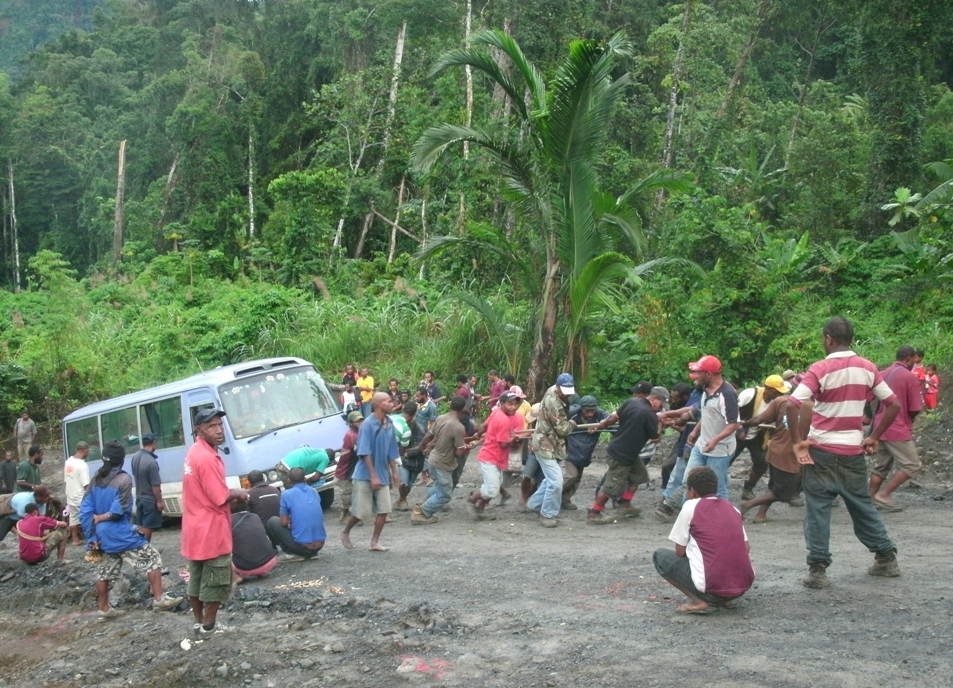
Bus stuck on its way from Mount Hagen to Madang

Transport in Papua New Guinea is mainly based around roads (the vast majority of which is unpaved) and air travel. It is in many cases heavily limited by the mountainous terrain and copious amount of rainfall and frequent severe weather occurring in many locations, such as Lae. The capital, Port Moresby, is not linked by road to any of the other major towns and many highland villages can only be reached by light aircraft or on foot.

== Governance ==
One of the key recommendations of the 1964 World Bank mission was the creation of a new department to manage the development of all transport modes. While many of the World Bank mission's recommendations were much argued both locally and internationally, this proposal was widely accepted as it was clear that both political and economic advancement depended on greatly improved land, sea and air transport. Beginning in 1967 with the appointment of a Coordinator of Transport heading a policy unit, in 1968–69 the Department of Transport was fully established for policy and investment in all transport modes, (civil aviation regulation remained with the Australian Department of Civil Aviation).

In the late 1960s, a large development program prepared by the Department of Transport as a result of the UNDP Transport Survey of Papua New Guinea was endorsed by the PNG House of Assembly, the Australian Parliament and multilateral agencies, and implementation continued through later decades. This and subsequent revisions provided the basis for loans from the multilateral agencies, in particular the World Bank, Asian Development Bank and UNDP, establishing a relationship which remains.

Major improvements were made to key highway links, notably between the coast and the highlands, to provide international standard port facilities at Port Moresby and Lae, and in lesser ports, for international and domestic airport upgradings, and for the regulation and management of transport services. The Department of Transport remains a key government agency. Transport assistance from Australia also continued. The Transport Sector Support Program is funded by the Australian Government and continues a long-term commitment to the sector. The Transport Sector Coordination, Monitoring and Implementation Committee (TSCMIC) brings together the heads of all the relevant agencies to coordinate work. This body was created after a National Executive Council decision and first met in July 2006. Maintenance of transport network assets remains a key challenge in order to get the best out of previous investments.

== Air travel ==
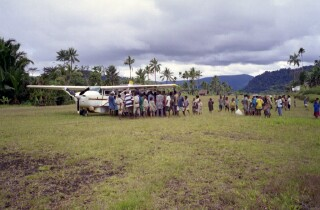
Rural airstrip at Haia, Eastern Highlands Province

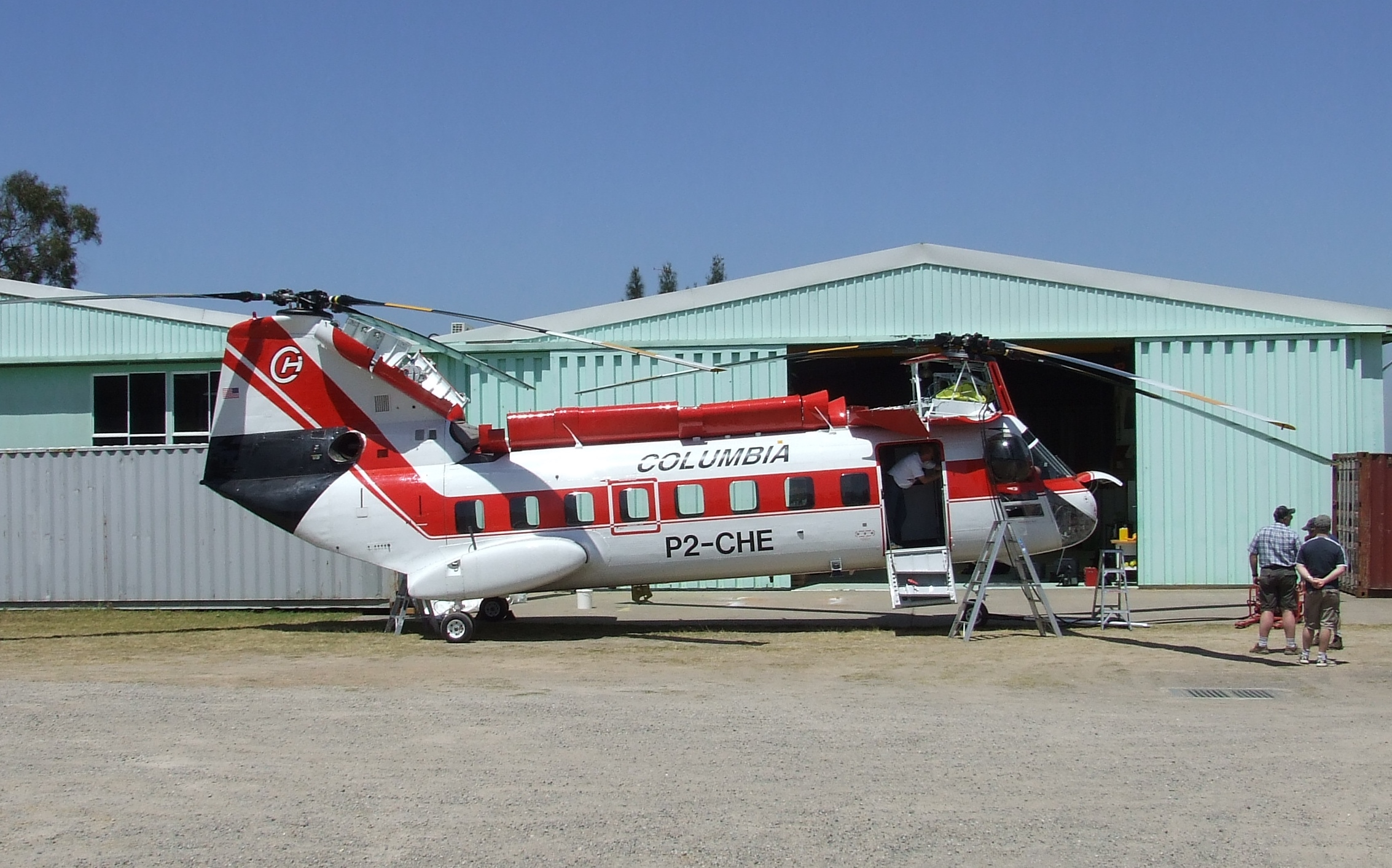
Columbia Helicopters, Inc, Boeing Vertol 107-II used for heavy lift transportation in Papua New Guinea.

Air travel is a very important form of transport in Papua New Guinea, for the transport of humans and high density/value freight. Aeroplanes made it possible to open up the country during its early colonial period. Even today the two largest cities, Port Moresby and Lae, are only directly connected by planes. The biggest airport in the country is Jacksons International Airport in Port Moresby. The national airline is Air Niugini.

Airports: 578 (2007 est.)

Airports - with paved runways
| 2,438 to 3,047 metres (8,000 to 10,000 ft) | 2 |
| 1,524 to 2,437 metres (5,000 to 8,000 ft) | 14 |
| 914 to 1,523 metres (3,000 to 5,000 ft) | 4 |
| under 914 metres (3,000 ft) | 1 |
| total | 21 |
Airports - with unpaved runways
| 2,438 to 3,047 metres (8,000 to 10,000 ft) | - |
| 1,524 to 2,437 metres (5,000 to 8,000 ft) | 10 |
| 914 to 1,523 metres (3,000 to 5,000 ft) | 58 |
| under 914 metres (3,000 ft) | 489 |
| total | 557 |

Heliports: 2 (2007 est.)

== Roadways ==
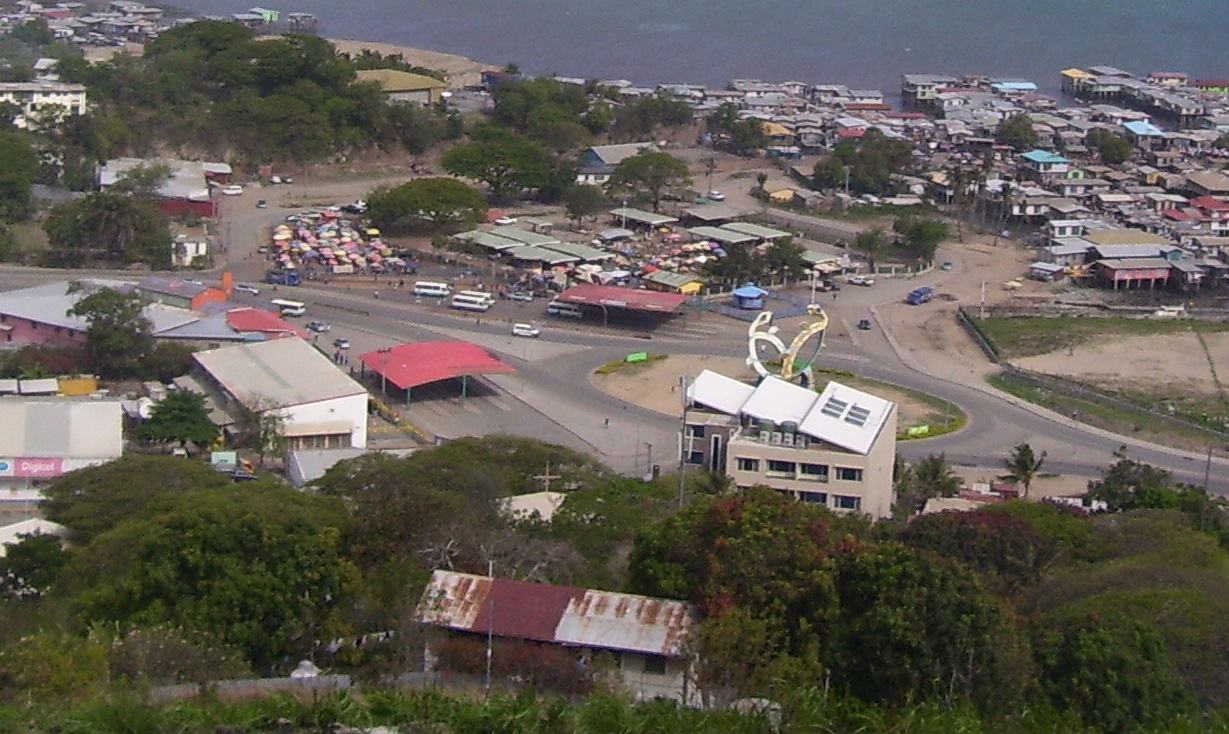
Bus station near Walter Bay

As of 1999, Papua New Guinea has a total of 19,600 km (12,200 mi) of all-weather highway, of which only 686 km (426 mi) is sealed/asphalted. Where there are roads there are many privately operated Public Motor Vehicles (PMVs), mostly minivans, which function as unscheduled buses.

The longest road in the country is the Highlands Highway, which links Lae and Madang to the Highlands region. The Boluminski Highway links Kavieng and Namatanai in New Ireland Province. A road linking Wewak in East Sepik Province and Vanimo in West Sepik Province was completed in September 2007, but by 2017, had fallen into disrepair and was no longer functional. The Kiunga-Tabubil Highway is a privately maintained road that links highland communities in the Western Province. As of June 2025, the Magi Highway is passable from East Cape at the tip of the Papuan Peninsula to Port Moresby, although much of the road is unsealed and the journey between Alotau and Port Moresby takes 13–14 hours.

== Railways ==
Papua New Guinea has no major railways, but some mine sites have disused tracks. During the period of German colonial control at the start of the 20th century numerous 600 mm (1 ft 11 5/8 in) narrow-gauge plantation railways had been constructed in German New Guinea. These were built near the settlements of Madang and Rabaul. After the fall of German New Guinea to the Australians in the First World War the railways fell into disrepair.

In September 2007, a mining company proposed to build a new railway to link the coast with a copper-molybdenum mine at Yandera in Madang province. In 2023, a line from Lae to Vanimo was proposed by Morobe Province Governor Luther Wenge and Prime Minister James Marape with the goal of expanding the region’s agricultural export opportunities.

== Waterways and ports ==
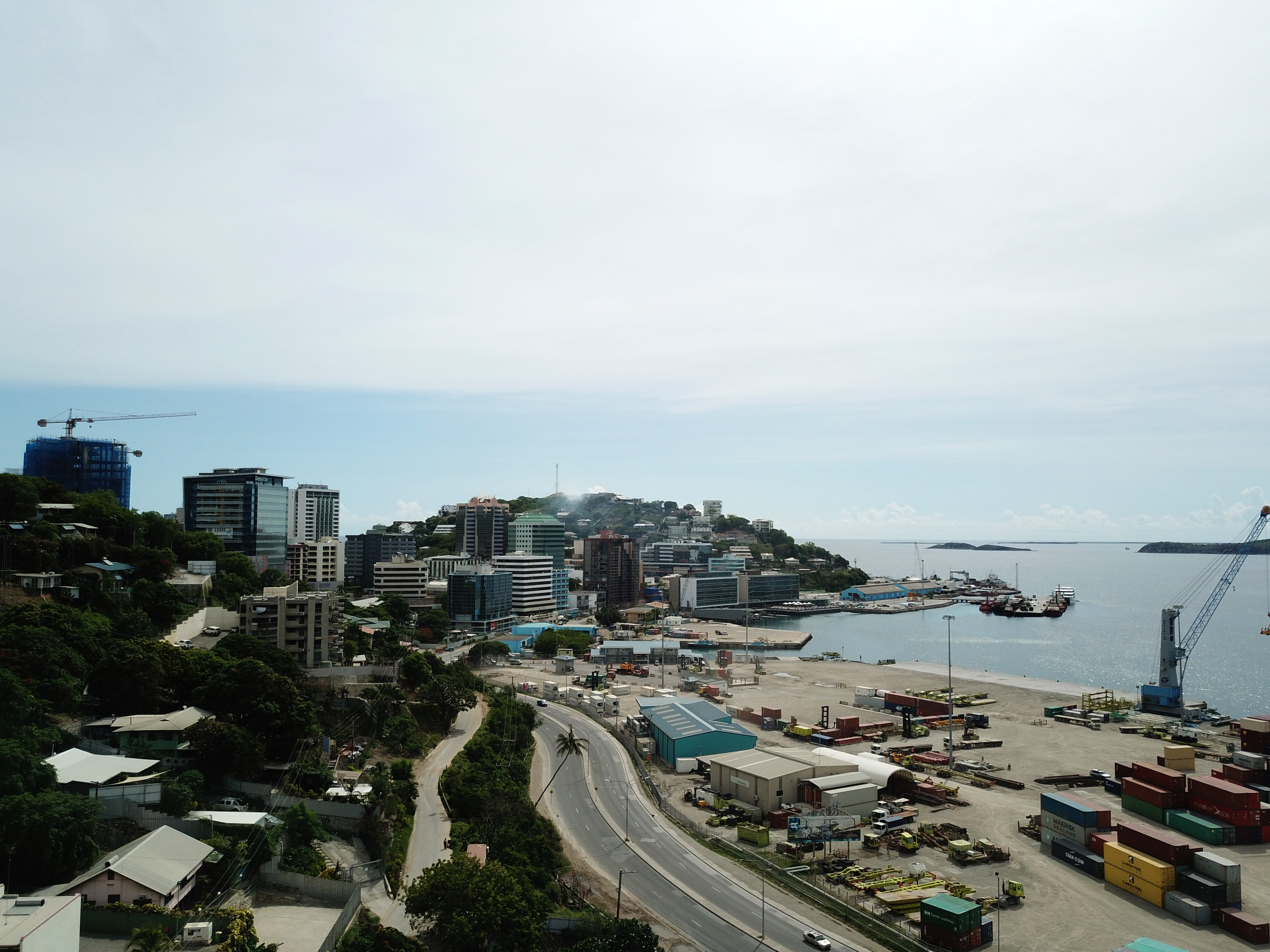
Port Moresby

The country has 10,940 km (6,800 mi) of waterways, and commercial port facilities at Port Moresby, Alotau, Oro Bay, Lae, Kimbe, Kieta Madang, Buka, Rabaul/Kokopo, Kiunga, Wewak and Vanimo.

The major exports are mining and raw materials, with some containerized trade through Port Moresby and Lae. Import volumes exceed exports, resulting in increased shipping costs as the inbound leg compensates for empty capacity on the outbound journey. Principal trade routes are southward to Australian ports, and northward to Singapore.

Merchant marine:
Total: 21 ships (1,000 GT or over) totaling 36,417 GT/52,432 tonnes deadweight (DWT)
Ships by type: bulk 2, cargo 10, chemical tanker 1, combination ore/oil 1, container 1, petroleum tanker 3, roll-on/roll-off 3 (1999 est.)

In coastal locations, small "banana boat" dinghies provide a local transport service.

== See also ==
- Papua New Guinea
- List of airports in Papua New Guinea
