= Tabar Island =

Island of the Tabar Group of Papua New Guinea

Tabar
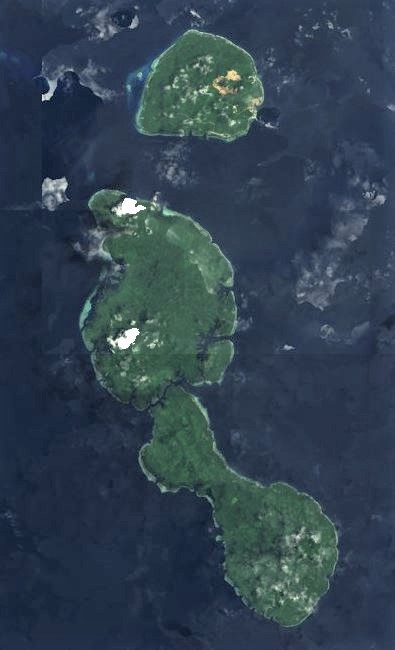
- Satellite image of the Tabar Group from north to south, the islands are Simberi, Tatau and Tabar.

- Location within Papua New Guinea

Geography
- Location: Oceania
- Coordinates: 2°55′S 152°01′E
- Archipelago: Tabar Group
- Area: 110 km^{2} (42 sq mi)

Administration
- Papua New Guinea
- Province: New Ireland Province
- District: Namatanai District
- LLG: Sentral Niu Ailan Rural LLG

Demographics
- Ethnic groups: Tabar people

Tabar Island is an island of the Tabar Group of Papua New Guinea, located to the east of New Ireland. It is inhabited by the Tabar people.

== Geography ==
Tabar Island is the main island of the Tabar Group and forms part of the New Ireland Province. It is located approximately 900 km (560 mi) north east of Port Moresby and about 24 km (15 mi) northeast of the province's main island New Ireland.

The island is of volcanic origin and has an area of about 110 km^{2} (42 sq mi) with a length of about 20 km (12 mi) and about 9 km (5.5 mi) wide. The highest altitude is approximately 400 m (1,300 ft) above sea level. Tabar Island is the largest and southernmost island in the archipelago.

The population is mainly divided into a few villages along the coast and the island's interior is covered mostly by rainforest. The main town of Datava is located on the island's northern part at Koko Bay.

The islands can only be reached by ship or chartered amphibian aircraft as they do not have an airport. The neighboring Tatau Island is on the other side of the narrow strait from Tabar that separates the islands.

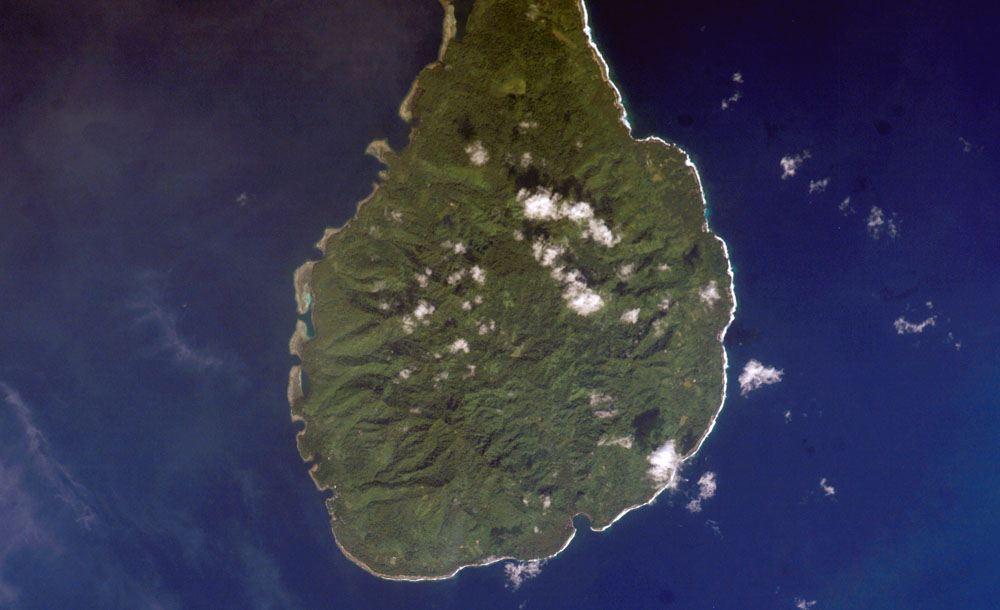
Southern part of Tabar island.

== History ==
The island has been inhabited by Melanesians since about 1500 BC. It was charted by Dutch captains Jacob Le Maire and Willem Corneliszoon Schouten in June 1616 and then named "Gardner Islands". They were later visited by Abel Tasman who then dubbed the area to the "Visser Islands".

The area came under German sovereignty in 1885 as part of German New Guinea. The area was managed initially by the German New Guinea Company.

Carl Emil Pettersson, a Swedish sailor who was shipwrecked and landed on the island in 1904, became its king (nicknamed "Strong Charly") after his marriage to the daughter of a local chief after he died.

After the First World War, the area ended up under Australian control, and Australia later became officially mandated for the entire Bismarck Archipelago by the United Nations.

From 1942 to 1945, the area was occupied by Japan, but returned to the Australian government mandate until Papua New Guinea became independent in 1975.
