= Palabong =

- Village
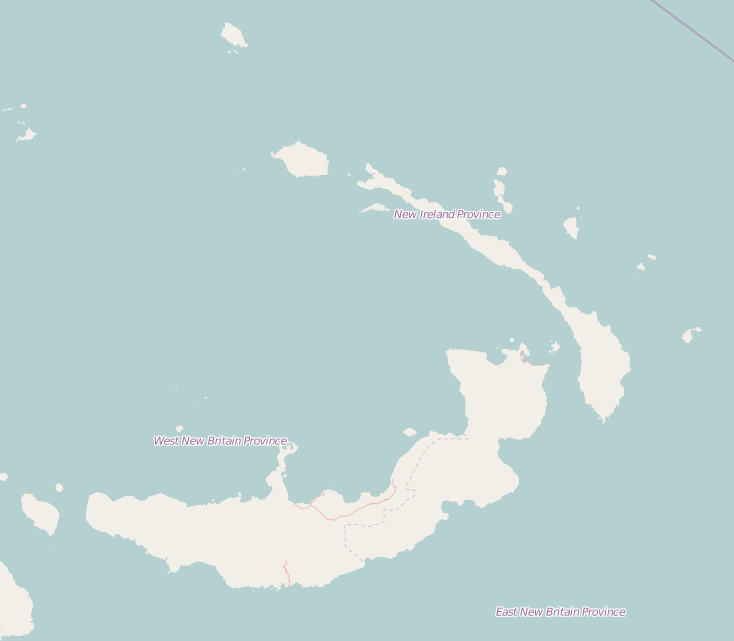
- Location
- Coordinates: 3°50′S 152°28′E
- Country: Papua New Guinea
- Province: New Ireland Province
- District: Namatanai District

Palabong is a village on the south-west coast of New Ireland, Papua New Guinea. It is located to the southeast of Umudu. It is located in Namatanai Rural LLG.
