= Ben Micah =

Papua New Guinean politician (died 2022)

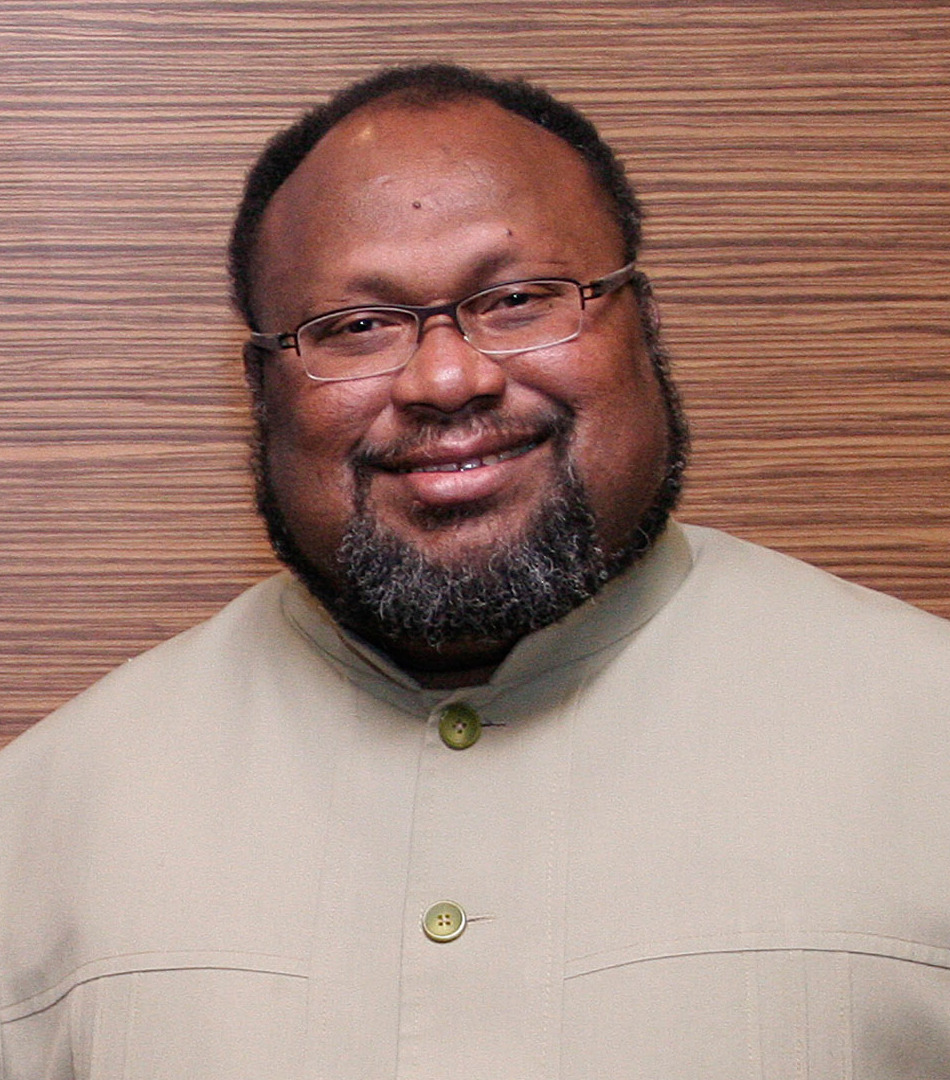
Micah in 2013

Ben Micah was a Papua New Guinean politician. He was a member of parliament for the Kavieng District, Papua New Guinea. Micah served as Minister for Transport, as Minister for State Enterprises under the O’Neill/Dion government from 2012 to 2016, and as Minister for Petroleum and Energy from 2016 to 2017. A long-time member of the People's Progress Party, he led the party from 2014 to 2017.

== Education ==
Micah attended the Papua New Guinea University of Technology, where he studied accountancy and served as president of the National Union of Students.

== Career ==
Micah was elected as an MP to Kavieng to the 5th National Parliament in 1992. He was appointed to serve on the Appointments Committee and Standing Orders Committee and was chairman of the Public Works Committee. Micah was unseated by Ian Ling-Stuckey in 1997.

Micah chaired the Constitutional Law Reform Commission in 1996 and subsequently played a significant role in the reforming the provincial government system, which was eventually abolished.

From 2012 to 2016, Micah served as Minister for State Enterprises under the O’Neill/Dion government and as chief of staff to the Prime Minister. In January 2016, he became Minister for Petroleum and Energy after a cabinet reshuffle.

In June 2014, Micah became leader of the People's Progress Party, taking over from Julius Chan.

Micah was unseated by Ian Ling-Stuckey in the 2017 Papua New Guinean general election, losing his Kavieng Open Seat.

== Personal life ==
Micah was originally from Emirau Island.

Micah was married three times. With his third wife, Maryanne Millie Micah, he had 4 children, of whom two were adopted.

After his career in politics ended, Micah was involved in promoting boxing. He was a patron and promoter of Oceania Fight Promotions until his death.

== Death ==
Micah died on 16 March 2022.
