= East Melanesian Islands =

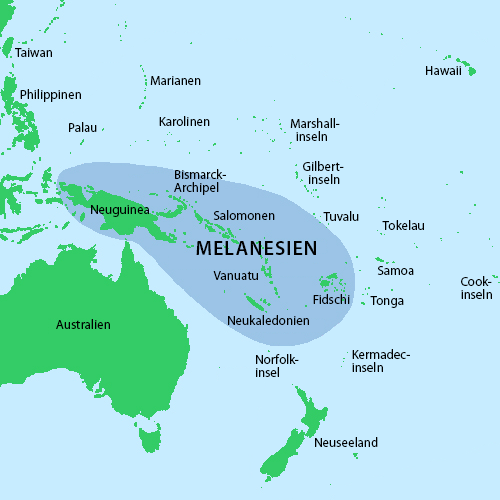
Melanesian Cultural Area

The East Melanesian Islands, also known as the Solomons-Vanuatu-Bismarck moist forests, is a biogeographic region in the Melanesia subregion of Oceania. Biogeographically, the East Melanesian Islands are part of the Australasian realm.

It is notable for its unique flora and fauna and species richness.

The region is designated a biodiversity hotspot by Conservation International (CI), and one of the outstanding Global 200 ecoregions by the World Wide Fund for Nature (WWF).

== Geography ==
As defined by CI, the hotspot lies east and north-east of New Guinea and encompasses some 1,600 islands with a land area of nearly 100,000 km^{2}, including the Bismarck Archipelago (including the Admiralty Islands), the Santa Cruz Islands, the Solomon Islands Archipelago (including Bougainville Island), and the Vanuatu Islands.

Politically, the hotspot includes the Islands Region of Papua New Guinea (including Bougainville) and all of Solomon Islands and Vanuatu.

The East Melanesian Islands has many plants and some animals whose ancestors arrived from neighboring New Caledonia and New Guinea, but differ from those islands in that they were never joined to a continent.

=== Ecoregions ===
This hotspot includes a number of ecoregions that make up the northeastern portion of the Australasian realm.

- Admiralty Islands lowland rain forests — (Papua New Guinea)
- New Britain-New Ireland lowland rain forests — (Papua New Guinea)
- New Britain-New Ireland montane rain forests — (Papua New Guinea)
- Solomon Islands rain forests — (Solomon Islands, Papua New Guinea including Bougainville Island)
- Vanuatu rain forests — (Vanuatu, Solomon Islands)

== See also ==
- Geography of Melanesia
