= Labur =

- Village
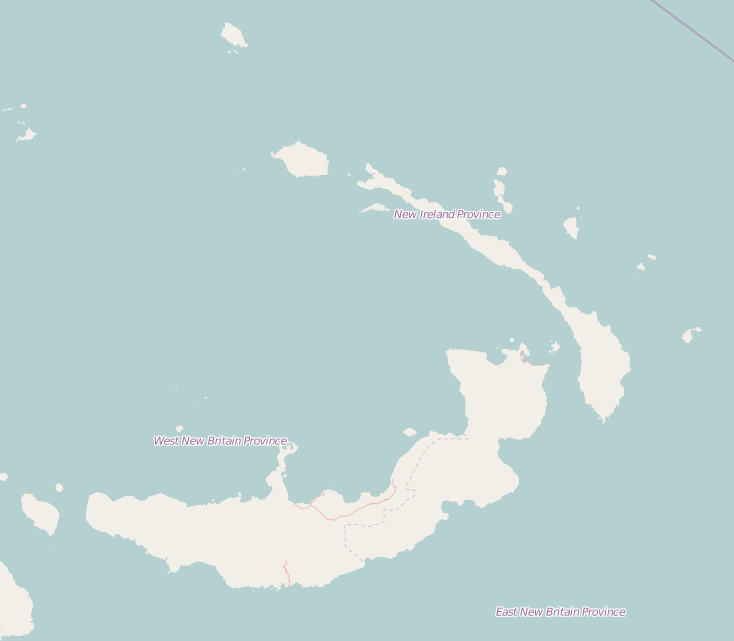
- Location
- Coordinates: 3°39′S 152°21′E
- Country: Papua New Guinea
- Province: New Ireland Province
- District: Namatanai District

Labur is a village on the west coast of New Ireland, Papua New Guinea. It is located to the south of Kalagunan, on Labur Bay. It is located in Namatanai Rural LLG.
