= Rasirik =

- Village
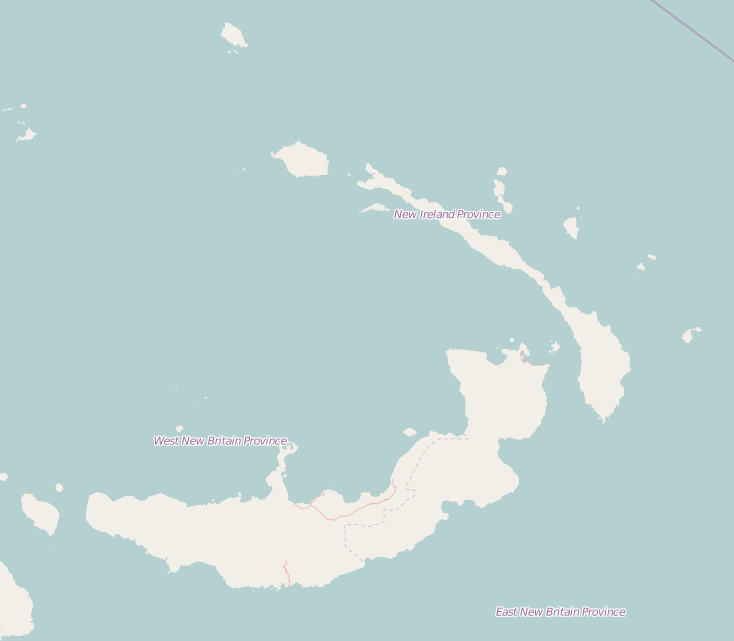
- Location
- Coordinates: 3°43′S 152°22′E
- Country: Papua New Guinea
- Province: New Ireland Province
- District: Namatanai District

Rasirik is a village on the west coast of New Ireland, Papua New Guinea. It is located to the south of Labur. The government has exploited timber reserves in the area. It is located in Namatanai Rural LLG.
