= New Britain–New Ireland lowland rain forests =

New Britain-New Ireland lowland rain forests
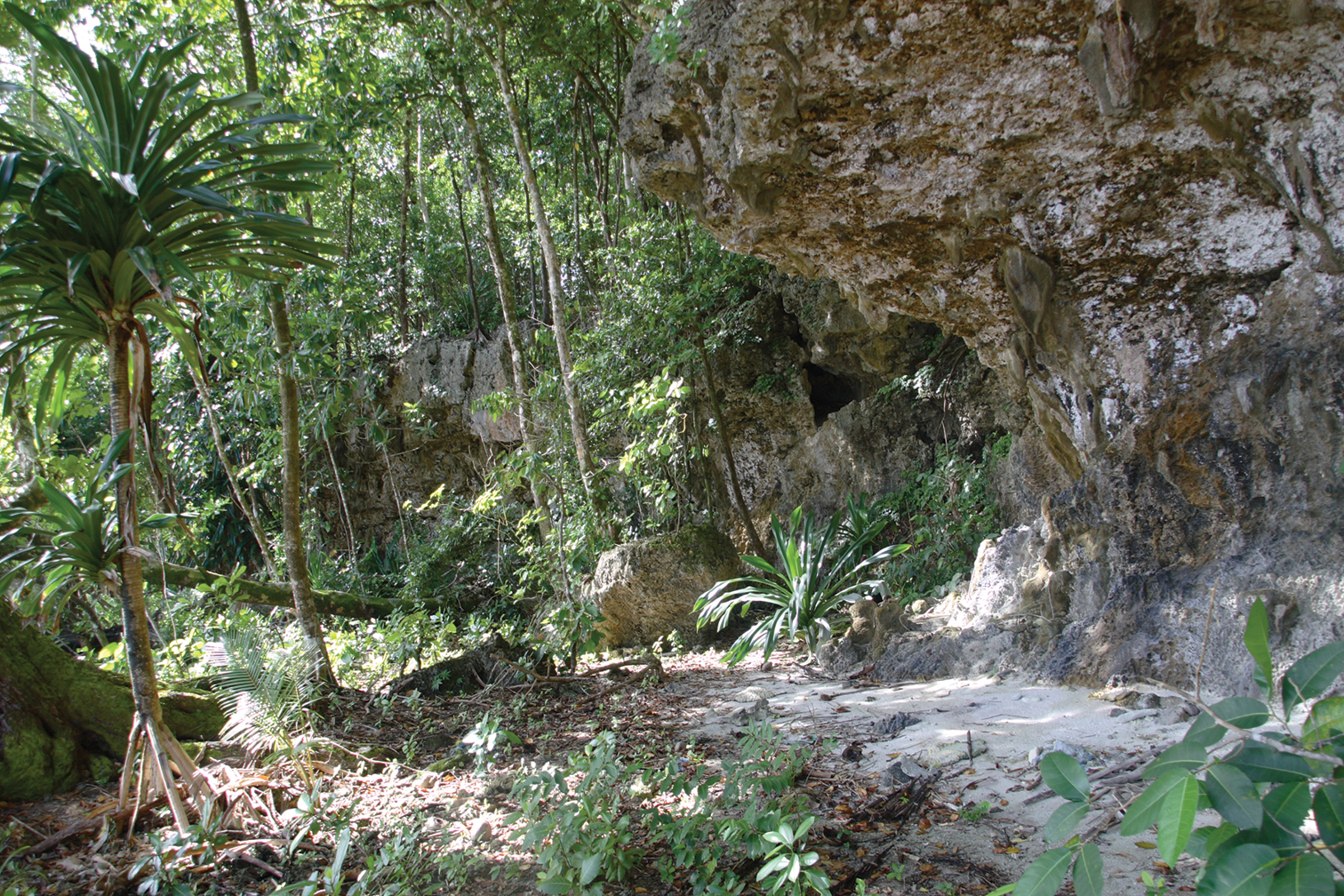
- coastal forest on karst, Mussau Island

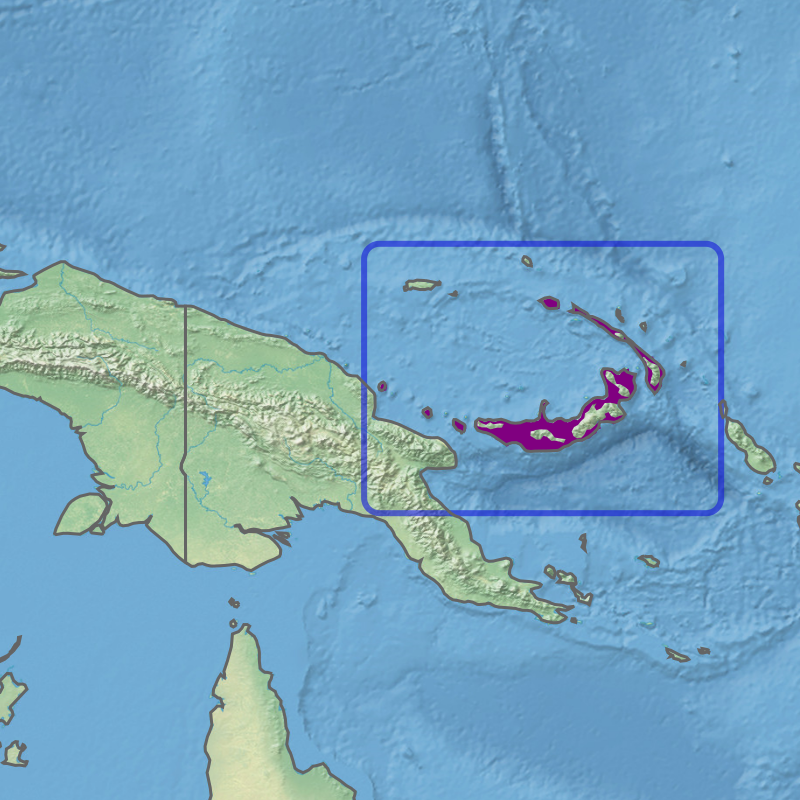
- Ecoregion territory (in purple)

Ecology
- Realm: Australasian realm
- Biome: tropical and subtropical moist broadleaf forests
- Borders: New Britain–New Ireland montane rain forests

Geography
- Area: 39,570 km^{2} (15,280 sq mi)
- Countries: Papua New Guinea
- Provinces: East New Britain; Madang; Morobe; New Ireland, West New Britain
- Coordinates: 5.7°S 150.35°E

Conservation
- Conservation status: Critical/endangered
- Protected: 1,026 km^{2} (396 sq mi) 3%

The New Britain-New Ireland lowland rain forests is a tropical moist forest ecoregion in Papua New Guinea. The ecoregion covers the lowland rain forests of New Britain, New Ireland, and nearby islands in the Bismarck Archipelago.

== Geography ==
The Bismarck Archipelago is a group of islands lying northeast of the island of New Guinea in Papua New Guinea. The ecoregion includes the lowland rain forests on New Britain, New Ireland, and nearby smaller islands, including Umboi, Long Island, and Karkar, near the New Guinea coast west of New Britain. The islands north of New Ireland, including New Hanover (Lavongai), the Saint Matthias Group, Tabar Group, Lihir Group, Tanga Islands, and Feni Islands, are also part of the ecoregion.

New Britain is the largest island in the ecoregion, with an area of 36,520 km^{2} (14,100 sq mi). New Ireland is the second-largest, with an area of 7,404 km^{2} (2,859 sq mi). The archipelago is mostly made of volcanic rocks, with extensive areas of limestone. Several of the ecoregion's volcanoes are still active. The islands are generally mountainous, with Mount Ulawun on New Britain reaching 2,334 m (7,657 ft). The portions of New Britain and New Ireland above 1,000 metres (3,281 feet) of elevation constitute the separate New Britain-New Ireland montane rain forests ecoregion.

== Climate ==
The ecoregion has a tropical wet climate. Annual rainfall varies from 1,500 to 6,000 mm (4 ft 11 in to 19 ft 8 in), depending on location.

== Flora ==
The predominant vegetation in the ecoregion is tropical rain forest.

== Fauna ==
The ecoregion has 47 species of mammals. 36 of them are bats, and the rest are murid rodents or marsupials.

The ecoregion has 19 endemic bird species. These include the black honey buzzard (Henicopernis infuscatus), slaty-mantled sparrowhawk (Accipiter luteoschistaceus), New Britain sparrowhawk (Accipiter brachyurus), New Britain bronzewing (Henicophaps foersteri), blue-eyed cockatoo (Cacatua ophthalmica), green-fronted hanging parrot (Loriculus tener), Bismarck hawk owl (Ninox variegata), Bismarck kingfisher (Ceyx websteri), New Britain kingfisher (Todirhamphus albonotatus), rusty thicketbird (Cincloramphus rubiginosus), white-breasted monarch (Symposiachrus menckei), Matthias fantail (Rhipidura matthiae), black-bellied myzomela (Myzomela erythromelas), Ashy myzomela (Myzomela cineracea), scarlet-bibbed myzomela (Myzomela sclateri), mottled munia (Lonchura hunsteini), New Ireland munia (Lonchura forbesi), New Hanover munia (Lonchura nigerrima), and Bismarck woodswallow (Artamus insignis).

== Protected areas ==
A 2017 assessment found that 1,026 km^{2} (396 sq mi), or 3%, of the ecoregion is in protected areas. About two-thirds of the unprotected area is still forested.
