= Franz Boluminski =

German colonial administrator

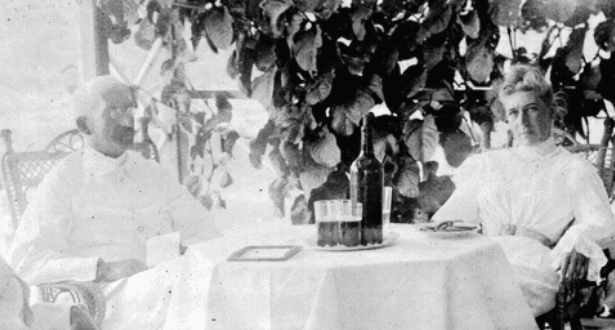
Franz Boluminski and his wife in Kavieng, 1902 (photograph by Otto Dempwolff)

Franz Boluminski (12 November 1863 – 28 April 1913) was a German colonial administrator.

== Career ==
Born in Graudenz, Kingdom of Prussia on 12 November 1863, Boluminski served in the German Army in German East Africa and in 1894 went to work for the German New Guinea Company at Astrolabe Bay near modern-day Madang in Papua New Guinea.

In March 1899, he transferred into the German colonial service and was posted to a new station of Kavieng on the island of New Ireland. In 1910, he was promoted to district officer.

His major feat was the construction of a road along the north-eastern coast of the island. He made each village along the coast construct a section and then maintain it. The road eventually became known as the Boluminski Highway, named in his honour.

At the same time, he established copra plantations connected to the highway, and this made New Ireland one of the most profitable parts of German New Guinea.

Boluminski died of heat stroke and is now buried in Bagail Cemetery in Kavieng.
