= Pierre-Antoine Véron =

French astronomer and mathematician

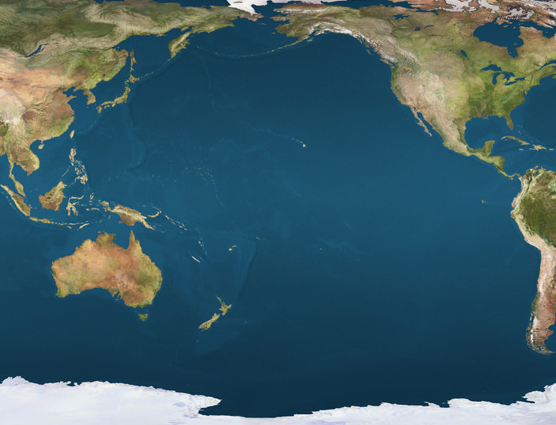
Before Véron's observations the width of the Pacific Ocean was unknown

Pierre-Antoine Véron (1736–1770) was a French astronomer and mathematician. He was a disciple of astronomer and writer Jérôme Lalande at the Collège Royal. Véron is famous for having made a historical observation of the size of the Pacific Ocean. Together with Philibert Commerson, Véron was one of the main scientists that accompanied Louis Antoine de Bougainville on his voyage of exploration. He died of illness in Timor in 1770.

== Exploration of the Pacific ==
Véron was the astronomer on Bougainville's ship during his 1766–1769 circumnavigation of the globe on the La Boudeuse and L'Étoile, but he had been on other ships earlier. By means of a solar eclipse and the new technology that was available to him, Véron was able to determine the longitude near Port Praslin in the southern part of New Ireland on 13 July 1768. This fact was important for, following a previous longitude he took at the Strait of Magellan, it allowed Véron to establish the width of the Pacific with precision for the first time in history.

The Verron Range, one of the main mountainous features in New Ireland, Papua New Guinea, was named after him.
