= Verron =

Verron may refer to:

- Verron (commune) a former commune in the French department of Sarthe
- Verron range, one of the main mountain ranges in New Ireland
- One of the synonyms of red French wine Fer
