= Namatanai Airport =

Airport in Namatanai, New Ireland, Papua New Guinea

- IATA: ATN; ICAO: AYNX

Summary
- Location: Namatanai, Papua New Guinea
- Elevation AMSL: 137 ft / 42 m
- Coordinates: 3°40′13.4″S 152°26′20.5″E

Map
- Location of airport in Papua New Guinea

Runways
Direction	Length		Surface
Direction	m	ft	Surface
12/30	1,065	3,494
- Source: PNG Airstrip Guide

Namatanai Airport (IATA: ATN, ICAO: AYNX) is an airfield serving Namatanai, in the New Ireland Province of Papua New Guinea.
