= Sentral Niu Ailan Rural LLG =

Local-level government in Papua New Guinea

- Location of Sentral Niu Ailan Rural LLG in Namatanai District of New Ireland Province in Papua New Guinea
- Country: Papua New Guinea
- Province: New Ireland Province

Area
  - Total: 1,818 km^{2} (702 sq mi)

Population (2011 census)
  - Total: 29,932
  - Density: 16.46/km^{2} (42.64/sq mi)
- Time zone: UTC+10 (AEST)

District map of New Ireland Province

Sentral Niu Ailan Rural LLG is a local government area in New Ireland Province, Papua New Guinea. The LLG administers the central area of the island of New Ireland, especially the people of the Barok, Mandak, Kuot, Notsi, and Tabar Group languages. The LLG is located in Namatanai District and the LLG headquarters is Konos.

The mainland section of the LLG is accessible by road from Kavieng and is bordered by Tikana Rural LLG in the north and Namatanai Rural LLG in the south. The population of the LLG is 29,932 as of the 2011 PNG National Census. It is mooted to be an electorate of its own to be known as "Sentral Niu Ailan Open" Seat in 2032 depending on the Electoral Boundaries Commission Review after the 2017 General Elections.

The Kuot language is spoken in the northern part of the LLG.

The current LLG president is Terence Kamari. His Predecessors were Ben Sakbua, Graham Lali and Toligai Tioti Soka. Kamari defeated Ben Sakbua during the 2025 LLG Elections.

== Wards ==
- 01. Simberi
- 02. Tatau
- 03. Datava
- 04. Mapua
- 05. Wang
- 06. Tandis
- 07. Lossu
- 08. Konos
- 09. Kimadan
- 10. Lelet
- 11. Dalom
- 12. Lemeris
- 13. Bulu
- 14. Karu
- 15. Komalu
- 16. Komalapuo (including Kalagunan village)
- 17. Daun
- 18. Messi
- 19. Ugana
- 20. Lamau
- 21. Patlanga
- 22. Panaras (Kuot language speakers)
