= Gold Ridge Mine =

Gold mine in Solomon Islands

Coordinates: 9°36′S 160°08′E

Gold Ridge is a gold mine on Guadalcanal, Solomon Islands, about 30 km (19 mi) southeast of the capital Honiara. Civil unrest caused closure for two years soon after opening in 1998. After several changes of hands since the 1990s, and under foreign ownership until its closure in 2014, the mine is now owned by Gold Ridge Mining Limited (GRML), which includes a 10% stake in its ownership by landowner-controlled company GoldRidge Community Investment Limited (GCIL).

== Early history of the area ==
During 1568 a Spanish explorer named Álvaro de Mendaña de Neira found gold near the mouth of the Matepona River, which flows from the present-day Gold Ridge area on the island of Guadalcanal in the Solomon Islands.

== 1930s–1950s ==
Active prospecting began in 1930s, and, after a number of attempts to work the area, in 1939, a prospecting licence was granted to the Balasuna Syndicate, which began hydraulic sluicing in the area. The syndicate subsequently started hydraulic mining in the area during 1939, until World War 2 halted all work during 1942.

During 1950 the Solomon Islands Geological Survey was established, which led to the start of systematic surveys in the area. In 1955 Balasuna obtained a prospecting licence and performed additional studies, but the prospect was dropped after there were no major finds. These surveys continued over the next 30 years, before modern exploration of the area subsequently started during 1983, after Amoco had successfully tendered for the rights to mine it. Cyprus Minerals brought the project during 1985 and farmed part of it in a joint venture with Arimco Mining. A feasibility study was subsequently completed during 1990 and updated during 1992, before the joint venture withdrew and allowed the leases to lapse.

== 1980s–1990s ==
In 1983 Amoco won a tender for Gold Ridge SPL 130, situated around 40 km (25 mi) from the capital of the Solomons, Honiara. In 1985 Cyprus Minerals bought the project, using part of it for farming, in partnership with Arimco Mining. A feasibility study was done in 1990, updated in 1992. After doing around 43,000 m (141,000 ft) of drilling, the companies withdrew in 1992.

Gold Ridge was put out to tender in 1994 by the Solomon Islands Government. Saracen Minerals, then a subsidiary of Crusader Ltd, was the successful bidder. They subsequently sold their interests to Ross Mining during 1995, who undertook over 103,000 m (338,000 ft) of drilling and updated feasibility studies, before in 1998 open pit mining commenced. Gold Ridge was operated by Ross Mining and Delta Gold Ltd between 1998 and 2000 but had to be abandoned because of civil unrest, triggered by landowner grievances, poor governance, and competition for land and resources in Guadalcanal Province.

== 2000s ==
After two years of operation Ross Mining was acquired by Delta Gold during May 2000, who abandoned Gold Ridge a month later because of civil unrest on Guadalcanal. As a result of the abandonment a political risk insurer subsequently paid Delta Gold and took ownership of the project. In 2003 it was acquired from the political risk insurers by Australian Solomons Gold.

During September 2004 the insurance company put the project out to tender with the support of the Solomon Islands Government and Gold Ridge Community. In May 2005 Australian Solomons Gold acquired the project, before they were taken over by Allied Gold during 2009. Allied Gold acquired the company in 2010 and subsequently rebuilt the mine.

== 2010s ==
Allied Gold subsequently announced a A$150 million refurbishment and redevelopment program during March 2010. Production was restarted at the end of 2010.

St Barbara Limited subsequently acquired Allied Gold in August/September 2012. The assets included Gold Ridge Mining Limited. St Barbara is an Australian-based gold mining company, with gold mines in the Yilgarn and Leonora Shires in Western Australia and the Simberi mine in the New Ireland Province of Papua New Guinea. The Gold Ridge mine was the only operating mine in the Solomon Islands at this time, and contributed approximately 20% of the gross domestic product of the Solomon Islands economy.

In April 2014, St Barbara shut down the Gold Ridge mine following flash floods. A few weeks later, St Barbara employees were banned by the Solomon Islands Government from re-entering the country. St Barbara was not given reasons, but a government spokesman said that it the government was concerned that the company had left the mine without informing the relevant authorities and land-owning communities. The mine was closed until 2018, and expected to resume production in 2019.

In May 2015 Gold Ridge was sold by St Barbara for A$100 to a landowner-controlled company, GoldRidge Community Investment Limited (GCIL), in a deal which included all legal and rehabilitation liability. The Solomon Islands Government's Disaster Management Council declared Gold Ridge a "disaster" area on 7 July 2015, owing to the poor condition of the dam holding the mine tailings, which was feared might collapse. There followed a year of arguments between the government, St Barbara, and landowners, regarding responsibility for the emptying the tailings dam. There were fears of contamination of the rivers that were relied on as a water source for over 8000 people. In April 2016 GCIL was accused of allowing toxic spill to occur, which it denied, saying that the recently released water had "only low concentrations of hazardous chemicals".

On 12 September 2019, GCIL signed a deal with China Railway Group Limited worth US$825 million to build and lease a railway system and mining service station. The contract lasts until March 2034. The mine had not been reopened by September 2020.

== Description and production ==
As of 2012, there were four main pits at Gold Ridge: Namachamata, Valehaichichi, Kupers, and Dawson, stretching about 5 km^{2} (1.9 sq mi) over a fault line. The deposits were described as "typical low sulphidation epithermal gold.

In July 2010, based on production rates at that time, the "proven and probable reserves" were estimated to be 23.3 million tonnes, at 1.73 g/t for 1.28 million ounces. This was projected to give the mine a life of at least nine years.

In 2018 (although at that time the mine had been closed since mid-2014), the capacity for production was estimated at 500 kg (1,100 lb) of gold per annum.

== Ownership ==
The Gold Ridge Mining Limited (GRML) is owned by Wanguo International Mining Group (70%), AXF Resources (20%) and Gold Ridge Landowners through the investment company Goldridge Communities Investment Ltd (GCIL) (10%). GRML is committed to ensuring that landowners and communities realise benefits from mine, and donates money towards schools and other social infrastructure in the area. GRML has said that it is committed to corporate responsibility and increased operational and environmental transparency, ensuring better communications than previously and allowing community participation in decisions about the mine.
