= Dichomeris explicata =

Scientific classification
- Kingdom: Animalia
- Phylum: Arthropoda
- Class: Insecta
- Order: Lepidoptera
- Family: Gelechiidae
- Genus: Dichomeris
- Species: D. explicata

Binomial name
- Dichomeris explicata (Meyrick, 1929)

Synonyms
- Gaesa explicata Meyrick, 1929

Species of moth

Dichomeris explicata is a moth in the family Gelechiidae. It was described by Edward Meyrick in 1929. It is found on New Hanover Island in the Bismarck Archipelago of Papua New Guinea.

The wingspan is about 17 mm (0.67 in).
