= New Britain–New Ireland montane rain forests =

Terrestrial ecoregion in Papua New Guinea

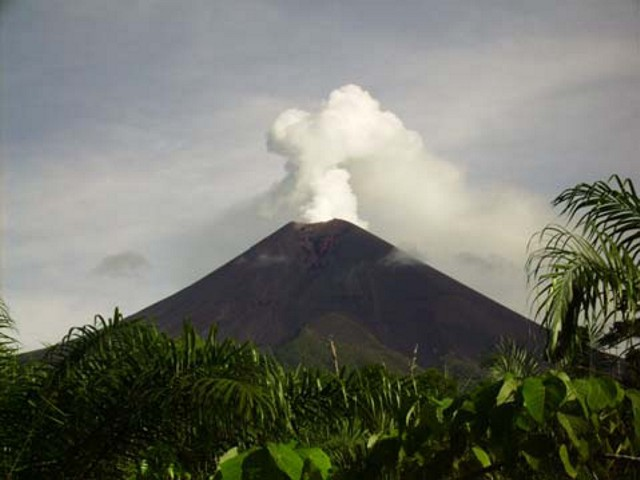
- Mount Ulawun, New Britain

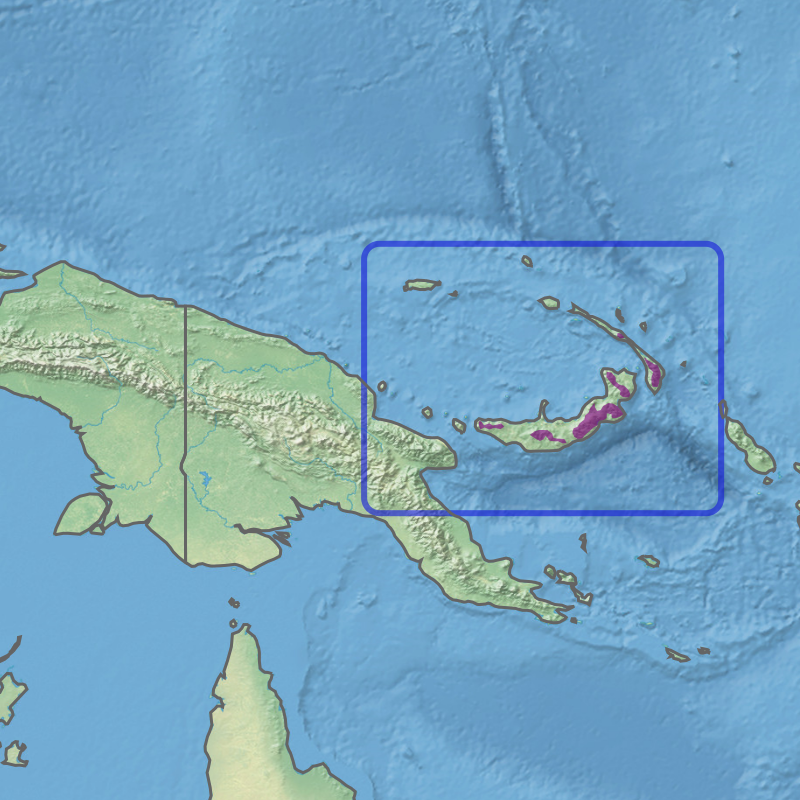
- Ecoregion territory (in purple)

Ecology
- Realm: Australasian realm
- Biome: tropical and subtropical moist broadleaf forests
- Borders: New Britain-New Ireland lowland rain forests

Geography
- Area: 14,138 km^{2} (5,459 mi^{2})
- Countries: Papua New Guinea
- Province: East New Britain; New Ireland; West New Britain
- Coordinates: 5.36°S 151.38°E

Conservation
- Conservation status: Critical/endangered
- Protected: 65 km^{2} (25 sq mi)%

The New Britain–New Ireland montane rain forests is a tropical moist forest ecoregion in Papua New Guinea. The ecoregion includes the mountain rain forests on the islands of New Britain and New Ireland, which lie northeast of New Guinea.

== Geography ==
The ecoregion includes the montane rain forests on New Britain and New Ireland, two large islands in the Bismarck Archipelago lying northeast of New Guinea. It includes the portions of both islands above 1,000 metres (3,300 ft) elevation.

New Britain is the largest island in the ecoregion, with an area of 36,520 km^{2} (14,100 sq mi). New Ireland is the second-largest, with an area of 7,404 km^{2} (2,859 sq mi). The archipelago is mostly made of volcanic rocks, with extensive areas of limestone. Several of the ecoregion's volcanoes are still active. The islands are generally mountainous. The highest point on New Britain is Mount Ulawun at 2,334 m (7,657 ft), and the highest point on New Ireland is Mount Taron at 2,340 m (7,680 ft). The Nakanai Range in East New Britain is made up of limestone karst, with extensive caves, cave river systems, and sinkholes. The montane rain forests are surrounded at lower elevations by the New Britain–New Ireland lowland rain forests.

== Climate ==
The ecoregion has a montane tropical wet climate. Annual rainfall varies from 3,000 to 6,000 mm (120 to 240 in), depending on location. Temperature generally decreases with altitude, humidity increases, and fog and clouds are common.

== Flora ==
The predominant vegetation in the ecoregion is montane tropical rain forest. The transition from lowland rain forest to montane rain forest is gradual. Above 1,000 metres (3,300 ft) elevation, species composition and forest structure change. Montane forests generally have a lower canopy than the lowland forests and lack buttressed roots, and many trees have smaller, glossy, dark-green leaves, called as laurophyll or lucidophyll. Epiphytes, including mosses, lichens, and orchids, are abundant. Soils are generally richer in humus than lowland soils.

Common trees in the montane forests include Castanopsis acuminatissima, Nothofagus starkenborghiorum, and the conifer Agathis robusta subsp. nesophila on New Britain, and species of Syzygium, Ilex cymosa, and Magnolia tsiampacca. Castanopsis acuminatissima is predominant in montane forests of New Britain and on New Guinea, but mostly absent from New Ireland. In parts of New Britain's central Plateau, Nothofagus starkenborghiorum forms large stands several square kilometers in extent, including a including a 60,000 hectare stand on the Nakanai Plateau. These stands often have a sparse understory composed mostly of ferns. Metrosideros salomonensis dominates the high-elevation forests of New Ireland.

== Fauna ==
The ecoregion has 45 species of mammals. The majority are bats, and the rest are murid rodents or marsupials.

The ecoregion has 3 endemic bird species – the New Britain goshawk (Accipiter princeps), Bismarck thicketbird (Megalurulus grosvenori) and Bismarck honeyeater (Vosea whitemanensis). There are 27 near-endemic species, many of which also inhabit the lowland rain forests ecoregion.

== Protected areas ==
A 2017 assessment found that 65 km^{2} (25 sq mi), or less than 1%, of the ecoregion is in protected areas. About half of the unprotected area is still forested.
