= Hans Meyer Range =

Mountain range in Papua New Guinea

- Location within Papua New Guinea

Highest point
- Peak: Mount Taron
- Elevation: 2,340 m (7,680 ft)

Geography
- Country: Papua New Guinea
- Province: New Ireland
- Range coordinates: 4°24′S 152°58′E

Geology
- Rock type(s): Limestone and volcanic rock

The Hans Meyer Range is a mountain range in the southern part of New Ireland, Papua New Guinea. This range was named after German geographer Hans Meyer (1858–1929).

2,340 m high Mount Taron, the highest point of the range, is also the highest point of New Ireland and the Bismarck Archipelago.

== Geography ==
Together with the Verron Range and the Lelet Plateau, it is one of the main mountainous features of New Ireland. It is located in the broader southern part of the island and runs roughly in a north–south-direction, parallel to the Verron Range. The Weitin valley divides the two ranges, Hans Meyer on the east and Verron on the west.

As other mountain ranges in Papua New Guinea it is home to many rare species of fauna and flora and is highly biodiverse and covered in thick rainforest. This range is part of the New Britain-New Ireland lowland rain forest terrestrial ecoregion.
