= Kalagunan =

- Village
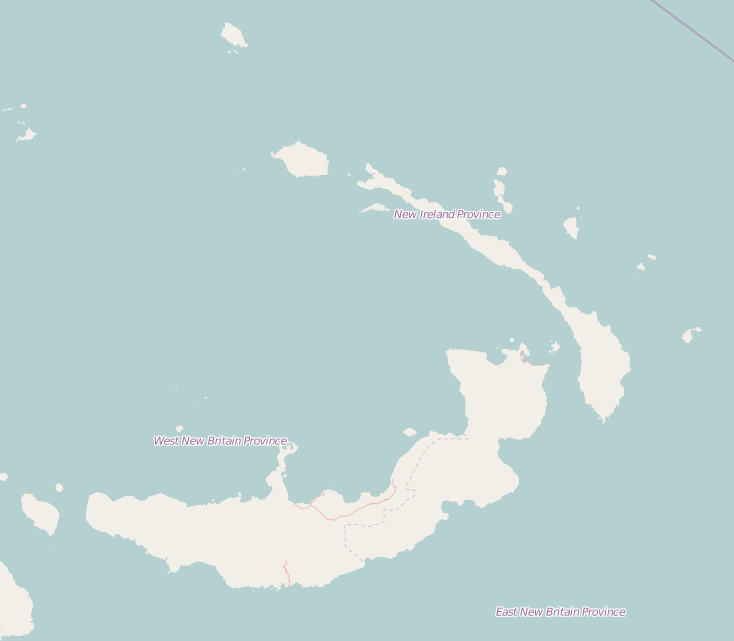
- Location
- Coordinates: 3°29′S 152°5′E
- Country: Papua New Guinea
- Province: New Ireland Province
- District: Namatanai District

Kalagunan is a village on the west coast of New Ireland, Papua New Guinea. There is a point here known as Kalagunan Point It is located in Sentral Niu Ailan Rural LLG.
