= Namatanai Rural LLG =

Local-level government in Papua New Guinea

- Location of Namatanai Rural LLG in Namatanai District of New Ireland Province in Papua New Guinea

- Location within Papua New Guinea
- Coordinates: 3.75°S 152.46°E
- Country: Papua New Guinea
- Province: New Ireland Province
- Time zone: UTC+10 (AEST)

District map of New Ireland Province

Namatanai Rural LLG is a local government area in New Ireland Province, Papua New Guinea. The LLG is located in Namatanai District and the LLG headquarters is Namatanai.

The LLG is accessible by road from Kavieng and is bordered by Sentral Niu Ailan Rural LLG in the north, Matalai Rural LLG in the south east and Konoagil Rural LLG in the west coast. The local language is Patpatar language with its Pala, Hinsaal, Sokarek and Sokirik dialects.

The LLG president is Joshua Soi Takin. Current Population is 20,003 as per 2011 PNG National Census Report.

== Wards ==
- 01. Palabong
- 02. Kabanut (including Umudu village)
- 03. Matakan
- 04. Burau
- 05. Rasirik
- 06. Labur
- 07. Loloba
- 08. Kanapit
- 09. Pire
- 10. Namatanai Urban
- 11. Salimun
- 12. Bisapu
- 13. Sopau
