= Kavieng District =

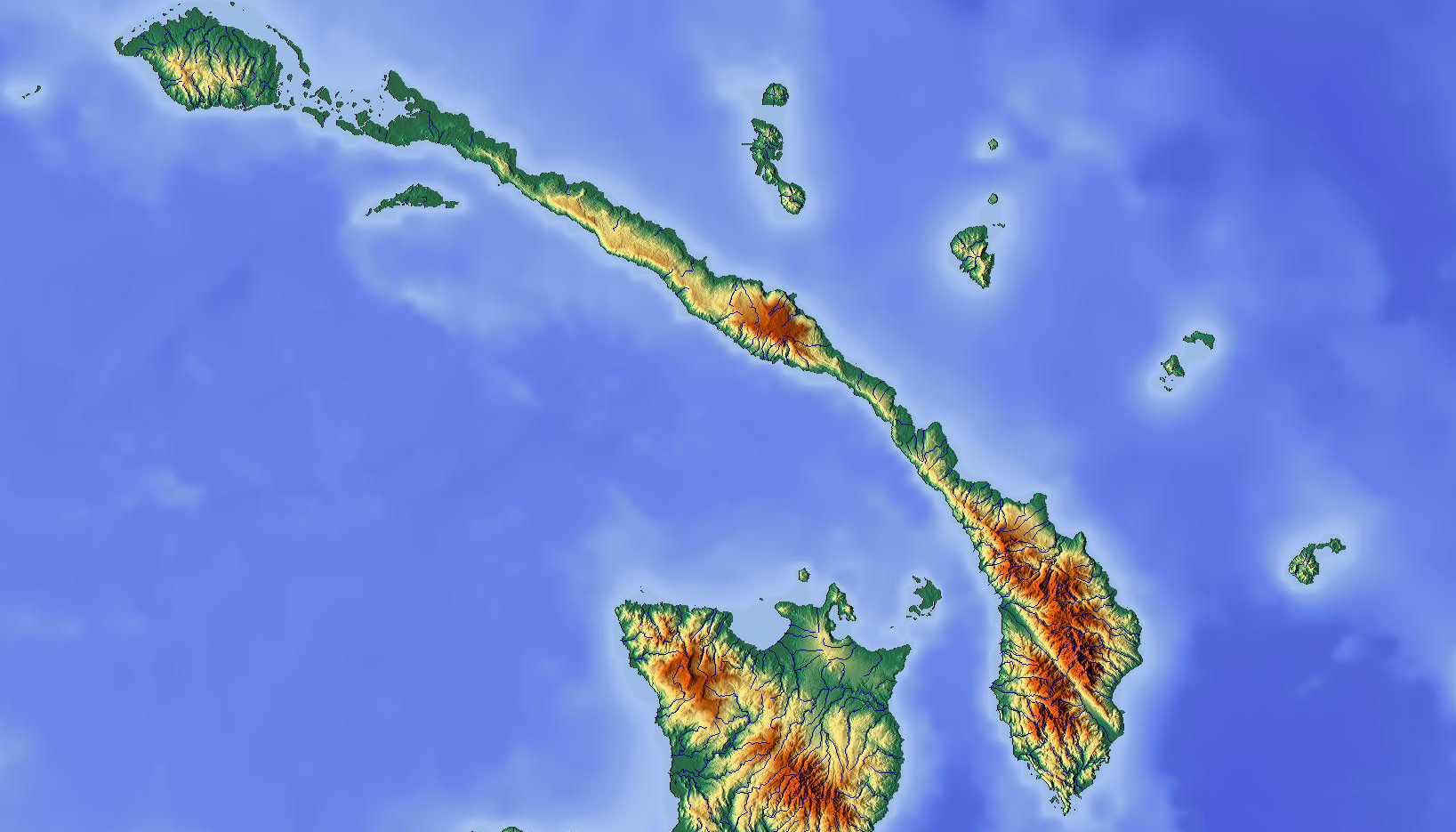
- Location within Papua New Guinea
- Coordinates: 2.5718°S 150.8048°E
- Country: Papua New Guinea
- Province: New Ireland Province
- Capital: Kavieng
- LLGs: List: Kavieng (U); Lavongai (R); Tikana (R); Murat (R)

Government
  - MP: Ian Ling-Stuckey

Area
  - Total: 2,983 km^{2} (1,152 sq mi)

Population (2011 census)
  - Total: 83,162
  - Density: 27.88/km^{2} (72.21/sq mi)
- Time zone: UTC+10 (AEST)

Kavieng District is the northernmost district of New Ireland Province in Papua New Guinea. The district contains the northern part of the island of New Ireland, as well as New Hannover, and the St. Matthias Group.

The district headquarters is Kavieng and the district has four LLG areas, Kavieng Urban LLG, Lavongai Rural LLG, Tikana Rural LLG and Murat Rural LLG.
