= Borpop Airfield =

Airport in New Ireland, Papua New Guinea

Coordinates: 3°52′34″S 152°48′45″E

Borpop Airfield, also known as Huris Airfield, was an aerodrome located near Namatani, west of Borpop Harbour in New Ireland Province, Papua New Guinea. The airfield was built by the Imperial Japanese during World War II.
