= Ian Ling-Stuckey =

Papua New Guinea politician

The Honourable Ian Ling-Stuckey MP
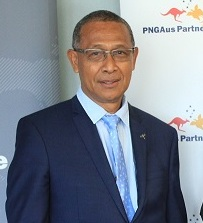
- Ling-Stuckey in 2021

Treasurer of Papua New Guinea
- Incumbent
- Assumed office 27 August 2019
- Prime Minister: James Marape
- Preceded by: Sam Basil

3rd Governor of New Ireland
- In office 2002–2007
- Monarch: Elizabeth II
- Preceded by: Paul Tohian
- Succeeded by: Sir Julius Chan

Member of the National Parliament of Papua New Guinea
- Incumbent
- Assumed office 2017
- Preceded by: Ben Micah
- Constituency: Kavieng Open
- In office 1997–2002
- Preceded by: Ben Micah
- Succeeded by: Ben Micah

Personal details
- Born: 27 December 1959 (age 66)
- Party: Pangu Party (2019–)
- Other political affiliations: National Alliance Party
- Education: Griffith University

Hon. Ian Ling-Stuckey (born 27 December 1959) is a Papua New Guinean politician and Member of Parliament for the Kavieng District. He served as a member of the National Alliance Party until joining the Pangu Party and the Marape Government as Treasurer in 2019.

He unseated former member Ben Micah of the People's Progress Party by 9,368 votes to Micah's 6,713 votes to claim the Kavieng Open Seat in the 2017 elections. This is his second time to be elected as Member of Parliament for the seat. He first won in 1997, then left in 2002 to be the New Ireland Governor from 2002 to 2007 where he lost to the Right Honourable Sir Julius Chan and was later re-elected in his old seat.
