= Johnson cult =

1964 protest movement in Papua New Guinea

The Johnson cult was a piece of political theater focused on 34th president of the United States Lyndon B. Johnson. Formerly misidentified as a cargo cult, it was initiated on New Hanover Island in Papua New Guinea in 1964. Although initially labelled a cargo cult, it has since been characterized as "political theater".

== History ==
Fortean Times gives this description:

What Billings discovered was an elaborate soap opera, a piece of political theatre and a game of high stakes. She found New Hanover to have a rich history of using play-acting and bluffing as a negotiation ploy that could be used in order to embarrass a foe. [...] In 1964, the New Hanoverans were fed up with their Australian administrators. Angry with these unpopular rulers, their real purpose was to embarrass them into giving them more aid, as development of their tiny island had been neglected for years. According to Billings, the Australian authorities responsible for overseeing the island had taken the 'cult' story at face value and were clueless as to what was motivating the islanders' 'strange' fixation on Lyndon Johnson. It was a cultural misunderstanding. [...] Ironically, the political gamesmanship of these so-called primitive, irrational islanders was so complex, subtle and unfamiliar that it went over the heads of both the Australian administrators and the world media.
