= Lovongai Rural LLG =

Local-level government in Papua New Guinea

- Location of Lavongai Rural LLG in Kavieng District of New Ireland Province in Papua New Guinea
- Country: Papua New Guinea
- Province: New Ireland Province
- Time zone: UTC+10 (AEST)

District map of New Ireland Province

Lovongai Rural LLG (also spelled Lavongai) is a local government area in New Ireland Province, Papua New Guinea. The LLG administers the island of New Hanover and a few surrounding islands. The LLG is located in Kavieng District and the LLG headquarters is Taskul. Some other population centres in the LLG are: Lavongai village, Puas, Umbukul, Tsoi, and Ungalik. This LLG has 19 wards, and comprised a population of 29,005 in 2011. The current LLG President is Caspar Lapangule. Former LLG presidents include Mathew Makapa, John Aini and Andrew Minkiong.

== Wards ==
1. Taskul
2. Patiagaga
3. Patipai
4. Ungakum
5. Tsoi
6. Tukulisava
7. Ungalik
8. Meterankasing
9. Noipuas
10. Sosson
11. Tingwon
12. Umbukul
13. Kone
14. Meteselen
15. Tioputuk
16. Lovongai
17. Meterangkang
18. Lungatang
19. Kulingei

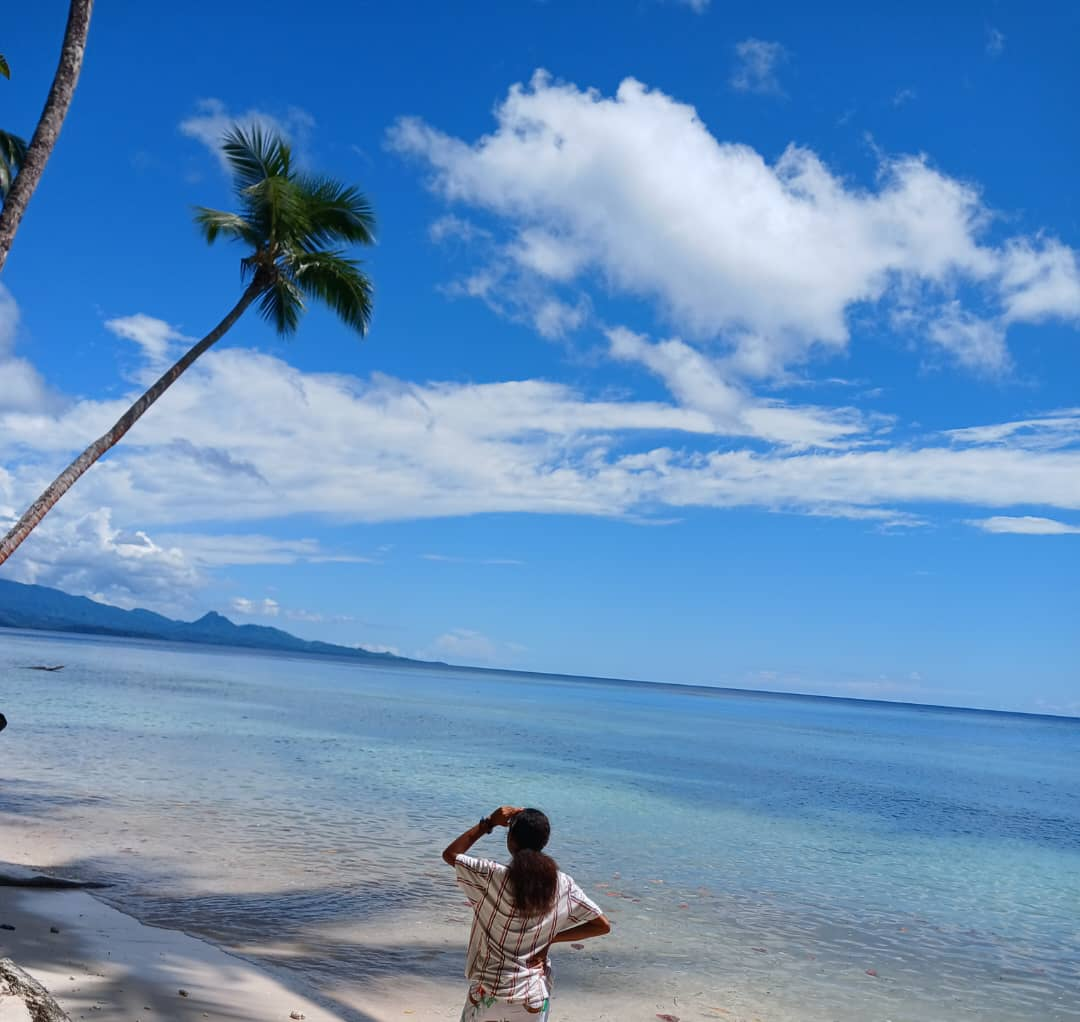
View of Suilava and Suilik mountains on Lovongai Island, as seen from Umbukul (Photo by Reinz).
