= Mandara language =

Austronesian language spoken in Papua New Guinea

Mandara
- Tabar
- Native to: Papua New Guinea
- Region: Tabar Group, New Ireland Province
- Native speakers: (4,000 cited 2000 census)
- Language family: Austronesian: Malayo-Polynesian; Oceanic; Western; Meso-Melanesian; (New Ireland); Tabar; Mandara
- Dialects: Simberi; Tatau; Tabar
- Writing system: Latin

Language codes
- ISO 639-3: tbf
- Glottolog: mand1440

Mandara, also known as Tabar, is an Austronesian language spoken on the Tabar Group of islands, New Ireland Province, Papua New Guinea. Three dialects have been identified, Simberi, Tatau and Tabar, corresponding to the three main islands in the group. Recently, a written form of Mandara has been made by a Korean missionary. So far, about 3,000 people are literate in this form of Mandara, and a Bible has been published in it as well.

== Phonology ==
The Simberi-Northern Tatau dialect has 14 phonemic consonants and 7 phonemic vowels. The language has four syllable patterns: V, CV, VC and CVC.

=== Consonants ===
		Bilabial	Alveolar	Velar
Nasal		/m/	/n/	/ŋ/
Plosive	Voiceless	/p/	/t/	/k/
Plosive	Voiced pre-nasalized	/ᵐb/	/ⁿd/	/ᵑɡ/
Affricate			/t͡s/	
Fricative		/β/	/s/	
Flap			/ɾ/	
Lateral			/l/	

- /p/, /t/ and /k/ are non-aspirated.

=== Stress ===
The final syllable of a word receives stress. There is no evidence of phonemic stress.
