= Boluminski Highway =

Road in Papua New Guinea

Route information
- Length: 193 km (120 mi)

Major junctions
- North-West end: Kavieng, New Ireland
- South-East end: Namatanai, New Ireland

Location
- Country: Papua New Guinea

Highway system
- Transport in Papua New Guinea

The Boluminski Highway is the main land transportation route on the island of New Ireland in Papua New Guinea. It runs from the provincial capital of Kavieng for 193 km down the east coast of the island to Namatanai and beyond. The whole highway from Kavieng to Namatanai will be sealed by the end of 2018.

Originally named Kaiser-Wilhelm-Chaussee during the German protectorate, it was renamed in 1921 into East Coast Road. After Papua New Guinea gained independence (1975) the Highway was renamed again, this time after Franz Boluminski who was the German District Officer from 1910 until his death in 1913. He built a large section of the highway by forcing individual villages along the coast to construct and maintain a section. If a section of the road fell into disrepair the village responsible would be punished by having to carry his sulky with him in it over the substandard section, and then his horse was reharnessed and he continued.

This was the first proper road in what is now Papua New Guinea. The quality of the highway was not rivalled on the mainland until the 1950s.
