= Murat Rural LLG =

Local-level government in Papua New Guinea

- Location of Murat Rural LLG in Kavieng District of New Ireland Province in Papua New Guinea
- Country: Papua New Guinea
- Province: New Ireland Province
- Time zone: UTC+10 (AEST)

District map of New Ireland Province

Murat Rural LLG is a local government area in New Ireland Province, Papua New Guinea. The LLG president is Herman Sole. The LLG administers the St. Matthias Group of islands and is located in Kavieng District. Population is 4,210(Census 2011).

== Wards ==
- 01. Tasitel
- 02. Magien
- 03. Loliang
- 04. Palakau
- 05. Emira
- 06. Tench
