= Kavieng Urban LLG =

Local-level government in Papua New Guinea

- Location of Kavieng Urban LLG in Kavieng District of New Ireland Province in Papua New Guinea
- Country: Papua New Guinea
- Province: New Ireland Province

Area
  - Total: 22.64 km^{2} (8.74 sq mi)

Population (2011 census)
  - Total: 16,725
  - Density: 738.7/km^{2} (1,913/sq mi)
- Time zone: UTC+10 (AEST)

District map of New Ireland Province

The Kavieng Urban LLG is a local government area in New Ireland Province, Papua New Guinea. The LLG is located in Kavieng District and the LLG headquarters is Kavieng. This LLG has six wards. The population is 16,725 (Census 2011) and the Lord Mayor is Hon. Stanley Mansini MPA.

== Wards ==
- 04. Bagail
- 05. Kulangit
- 06. Maiom
- 80. Kavieng Urban
