= Verron Range =

Mountain range in Papua New Guinea

- Hahlgebirge
- Location within Papua New Guinea

Highest point
- Elevation: 1,920 m (6,300 ft)
- Prominence: 1,202 m (3,944 ft)
- Listing: Ribu

Geography
- Country: Papua New Guinea
- Region: New Ireland
- Range coordinates: 4°21′S 152°46′E

Geology
- Rock age: Triassic
- Rock type(s): Limestone and volcanic rock

The Verron Range is a mountain range in the southern part of New Ireland, Papua New Guinea, composed of limestone and volcanic rock. The highest point of the mountains is at 1,920 m. Together with the Hans Meyer Range and the Lelet Plateau, it is one of the main mountainous features of New Ireland.

== Geography ==
The Verron Range is located in the broader southern part of New Ireland Island and runs roughly in a north–south direction, parallel to the Hans Meyer Range. The Weitin valley divides the two ranges, Verron on the west and Hans Meyer on the east.

This range was named "Verron" (Véron) after Pierre-Antoine Véron (1736–1770), the astronomer on Louis Antoine de Bougainville's ship who was able to determine the longitude by means of a solar eclipse around this location on 13 July 1768. This fact was important for it allowed Véron to establish the width of the Pacific Ocean with precision for the first time in history. While the island was part of German New Guinea, this range was named Hahlgebirge (Hahl Range) after German colonial governor Albert Hahl (1868–1945).

Like other high ranges in the region, the Verron Range is covered in thick rainforest and has been little studied. It is home to many rare species of fauna and flora and is highly biodiverse. This range is part of the New Britain-New Ireland lowland rain forest terrestrial ecoregion.
