= Namatanai =

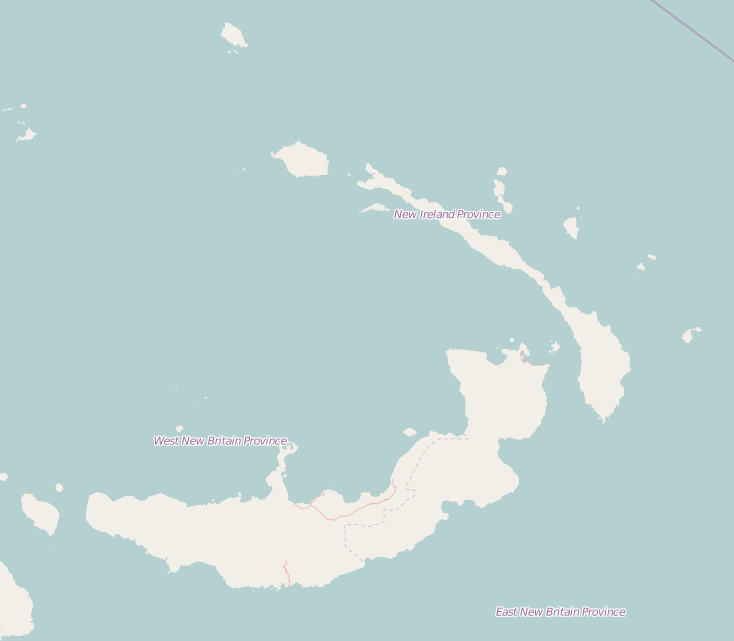
- Location within New Britain and Ireland
- Coordinates: 3°40′S 152°26′E
- Country: Papua New Guinea
- Province: New Ireland
- District: Namatanai District
- LLG: Namatanai Rural

Population (2011)
  - Total: 1,542
- Time zone: UTC+10 (AEST)
- Climate: Af

Namatanai is a town on the island province of New Ireland in Papua New Guinea. It is the second largest settlement on the island and connected to the largest and provincial capital of Kavieng (264 km to the north-west) by the Boluminski Highway. In 2005, Namantanai was estimated to have a population of 1300 people. It is the seat of Namatanai Rural LLG.

During German New Guinea, Namatanai was an important station. Today the Namatanai Hotel sits on top of the old German Station house. On 28 January 1943, Japanese troops on the Goya Maru landed at Namatanai and searched the station but found no Australian troops and departed. On 15 June 1943, Chinese man, Leong Cheung, was publicly shot in town. Namatanai has a small airfield with the IATA code ATN.

Every August the town hosts the Namatanai Mask Festival.
