= Simberi Island =

Island of the Tabar Group of Papua New Guinea

Simberi
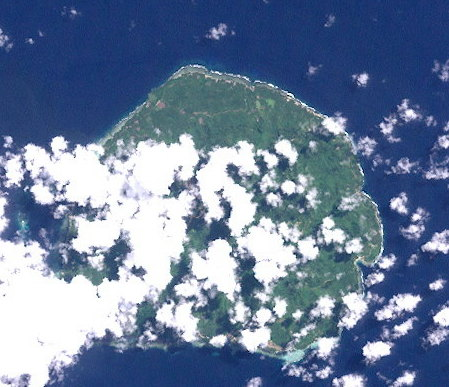
- As seen from Landsat

- Location within Papua New Guinea

Geography
- Location: Melanesia
- Coordinates: 2°37′29.33″S 151°58′25.96″E
- Archipelago: Bismarck Archipelago
- Area: 40 km^{2} (15 sq mi)
- Highest elevation: 340 m (1120 ft)

Administration
- Papua New Guinea
- Province: New Ireland Province

Demographics
- Population: 1100

Simberi Island is a volcanic island in the Tabar Group, in Papua New Guinea's New Ireland Province.

== Geography and geology ==
Simberi is the northernmost and smallest of the three islands in the Tabar Group. The island is about 9 km (5.6 mi) long and 7 km (4.3 mi) wide and has an area of about 40 square kilometers (15 sq mi). Its highest point in the highlands on the eastern side of the island is a 340 m (1,120 ft) eroded volcanic cone. The interior of the island is largely covered by rainforest. Most of the island's coast is steep and surrounded by a fringing reef together with a series of small islets. There is a woman shaped figure made by trees on the island and a barrier reef about 10 km (6 mi) offshore from the west coast. A 2 km (1 mi) strait separates Simberi from Tatau Island to the south west.

Simberi island is a potassium rich (high-K) calc-alkaline island arc volcano, the oldest in the Pliocene to Holocene Tabar-Lihir-Tanga-Feni (TLTF) volcanic arc that formed above a subduction zone.

== People ==
The population is about 1100 and made up of nine clans who live in small coastal villages mainly in the north and west. The local language is a Simberi dialect of Mandara (also known as Tabar), ISO 639-3 language code "tbf", an Austronesian language spoken on the Tabar Islands.

== Transport ==
The island has an airport, Simberi Airport (IATA airport code "NIS"), on the south east coast.

== Simberi Oxide Gold Project ==
St Barbara Limited, an Australian-based company, operate an open pit gold (and silver) mine called the Simberi Oxide Gold Project in the volcanic highlands on the eastern side of the island. The mine is wholly owned and operated by St Barbara Limited, who acquired the assets of Allied Gold, the previous operators of the Simberi mine, on 31 August 2012. Gold production started in February 2008. Mining was suspended in December 2009 after Allied Gold received a cease work order from the Mineral Resources Authority of Papua New Guinea because of local landholder issues. Mining has since recommenced.

Seven gold deposits have been defined in mining lease 136 (ML 136), which covers the central and eastern portion of Simberi Island, and other prospects have been identified. The gold deposits occur mainly on ridge tops and are all within 2–3 km (1–2 mi) of each other. Sorowar in the north is the largest resource while Samat North, South and East to the south are relatively small but relatively high grade. Pigiput, Pigibo and Botlu South lie between the Sorowar and Samat areas and are of intermediate tonnage but at a grade similar to Sorowar. The western area of Simberi Island within exploration license EL 609 is largely unexplored. Reconnaissance exploration for both oxide and sulphide mineralisation is planned.

As of June 2009, Allied reported that the total resources were 4.7 million troy ounces (5.2 million ounces; 150 million grams) (Moz) gold, being oxide gold resources of 1.4 million ozt (1.5 million oz; 44 million g) and sulphide gold resources of 4.7 million ozt (5.2 million oz; 150 million g) together with 10.2 million ozt (11.2 million oz; 320 million g) silver.

Ore is delivered to the processing facilities on the eastern coast near Pigiput Bay by a 2,665 m-long (8,743 ft) RopeCon aerial conveyor that can deliver 600 tonnes (590 long tons; 660 short tons) of ore per hour. The process plant is a conventional carbon-in-leach (CIL) gold process plant capable of treating 2.2 million tonnes (2.2 million long tons; 2.4 million short tons) of ore per year. In September 2010, Allied announced that it planned to increase its gold production to 100,000 troy ounces (110,000 oz; 3,100,000 g) per year. The oxide processing circuit at the Simberi operation will be expanded to 3.5 million tonnes (3.4 million long tons; 3.9 million short tons) a year, by June 2013.

Mine tailings are disposed of in the form of a slurry that has been pre-diluted with seawater using a deep sea tailings pipeline. The pipeline is 528 m (1,732 ft) long with the discharge point at a depth of 130 m (430 ft). The tailings flow down a steep submarine slope and are deposited at a depth of more than 3 kilometers (1.9 mi).

Production for the period from 1 July 2009 to 30 June 2010 was 64,327 troy ounces (70,576 oz; 2,000,800 g).

In June 2009, Allied reported that the remaining mine life was estimated to be over 10 years. St Barbara Limited (Australia) acquired Allied in September 2012 and is the current owner of this mining operation. They are the largest employer on the island.
