= Mount Taron =

Mountain on New Ireland, Papua New Guinea

- Mount Agil
- Location within Papua New Guinea

Highest point
- Elevation: 2,340 m (7,680 ft)
- Prominence: 2,340 m (7,680 ft)
- Listing: Ultra and Ribu
- Coordinates: 4°21′S 152°53′E

Geography
- Parent range: Hans Meyer Range

Mount Taron (also spelt Tahron) or Mount Agil is the highest point in the Hans Meyer Range on New Ireland in Papua New Guinea. It is the highest point of New Ireland and the entire Bismarck Archipelago.
