= Tabar Group =

Island group in Papua New Guinea

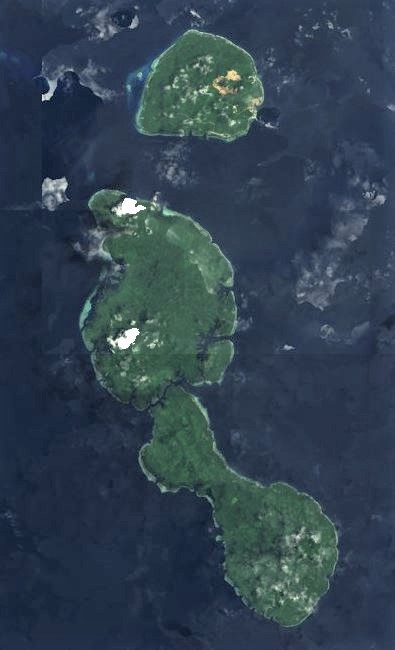
- From north to south, the islands are Simberi, Tatau and Tabar.

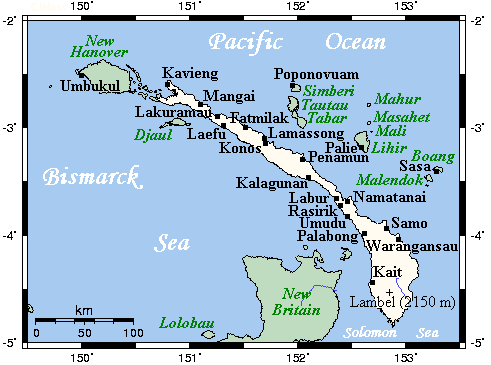
- The Tabar Group is to the north of New Ireland

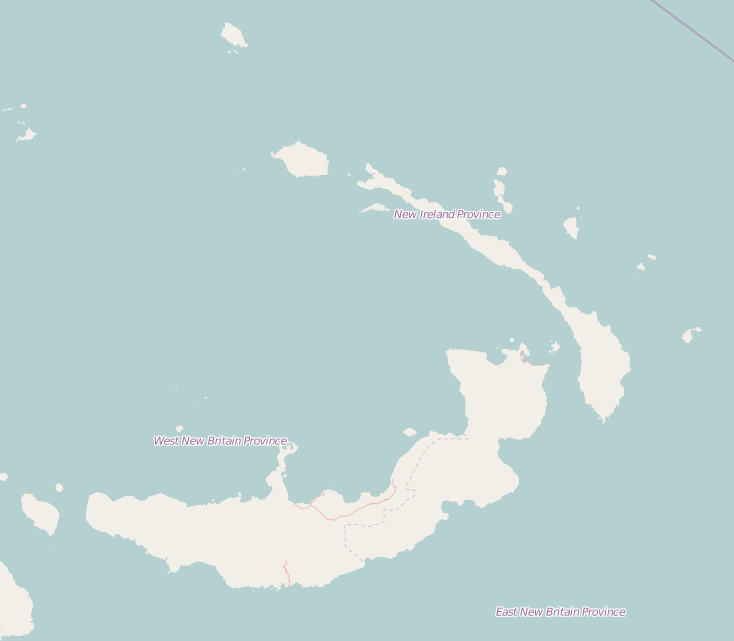
- Location within New Britain Location within Papua New Guinea

Geography
- Location: South Pacific Ocean
- Coordinates: 2°49′S 151°57′E
- Archipelago: Bismarck Archipelago
- Major islands: 3
- Highest elevation: 622 m (2041 ft)
- Highest point: Mount Beirari

Administration
- Papua New Guinea
- Region: Islands Region
- Province: New Ireland Province
- District: Namatanai District
- LLG: Sentral Niu Ailan Rural LLG

The Tabar Group is an island group in Papua New Guinea, located 40 km (25 mi) north of New Ireland. It is a part of the Bismarck Archipelago. The Tabar group consists of a short chain of three main islands – Tabar Island (a.k.a. Big Tabar) in the south, Tatau Island in the center, and Simberi Island in the north – as well as a number of smaller offshore islets. The highest peak is Mount Beirari at 622 m (2,041 ft).

The population of the island group was 3,920 at the 2000 Census. The Tabar Group is administered by the Sentral Niu Ailan Rural Local Level Government (LLG), New Ireland Province.

The Tabar Group is the area of origin of Malagan art. The local language is Mandara (also known as Tabar), ISO 639-3 language code "tbf", an Austronesian language. Three dialects have been identified, Simberi, Tatau and Tabar.
