= Tatau Island =

Island of the Tabar Group of Papua New Guinea

Coordinates: 2°47′S 151°58′E

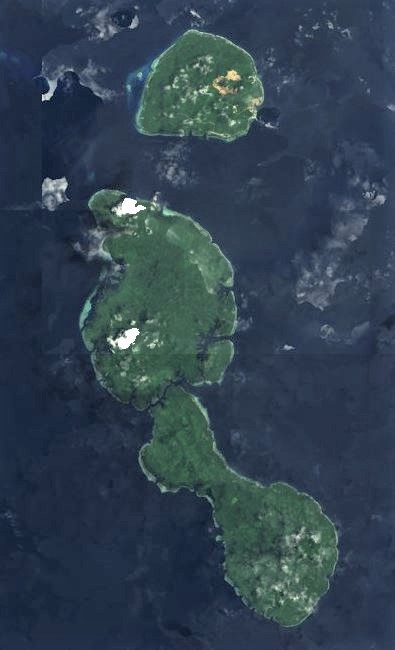
Tatau Island is in the center of the Tabar Group

Tatau Island is an island of the Tabar Group of Papua New Guinea, located to the east of New Ireland and about a mile south of Simberi Island.
