= New Hanover Island =

Island in Papua New Guinea

New Hanover
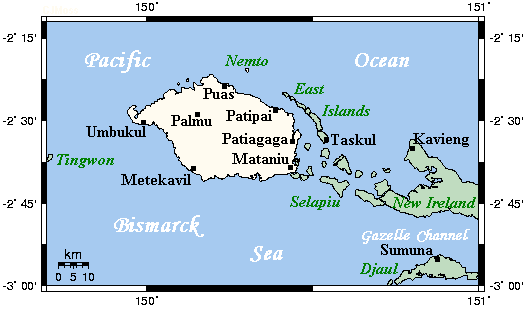
- New Hanover closeup map

- Location within Papua New Guinea

Geography
- Coordinates: 2.5°S 150.25°E
- Archipelago: Bismarck Archipelago
- Area: 1,186 km^{2} (458 sq mi)
- Length: 60 km (37 mi)
- Width: 30 km (19 mi)
- Highest elevation: 900 m (3000 ft)

Administration
- Papua New Guinea
- Province: New Ireland Province
- District: Kavieng District
- LLG: Lavongai Rural LLG

Demographics
- Population: 17,160 (2000)
- Pop. density: 15.4/km^{2} (39.9/sq mi)

New Hanover Island, (German: Neuhannover), also called Lavongai or Lovongai, is a large volcanic island in the New Ireland Province of Papua New Guinea (PNG). This region is part of the Bismarck Archipelago and lies at 2.5°S 150.25°E. Measuring some 460 square miles (1,200 km^{2}), it had a population of 5,000 in 1960, which increased to approximately 17,160 by 2000. It is part of the Lovongai Rural LLG local government area.

== Culture ==
Friedrich Ratzel in The History of Mankind reported in 1896, when discussing Melanesian ornament, that there were luxurious feather ornament displays in New Hanover, showing much taste in the combination of forms and colours with vegetable fibres and beads on sticks. An example was a delicately formed face in feather-mosaic forming the head of a hairpin.

New Hanover is particularly known for the so-called Johnson cult. This began with the presence of two US army surveyors on the island, from whom the people learnt about President Lyndon B Johnson. In 1964, during the first election to elect representatives to the House of Assembly of Papua and New Guinea in what was then an Australian-administered territory, the people saw an opportunity to express their dislike of the existing colonial administration and the local people who supported it. Instead of completing the voting form and putting it into a ballot box, selected leaders of the voters had written on boards "We Vote for President Johnson of America". Many men subsequently refused to pay taxes and spent time in jail in Kavieng, capital of New Ireland Province. The cult supporters also collected around A$1000 to send to Johnson to pay for his travel there.

The cult expressed the hopes of those who resented the new powers of educated villagers. The failure of the Australian administration's projects to develop cash crops in the area also led to a rejection of the colonial power. However, the cult also saw self-government and eventual independence as undesirable. The island was studied by Dorothy Billings who saw the cult as resistance to a period where white authority was employed to sustain new inequalities between Melanesians. Billings rejected the idea that the Johnson cult had religious or mystical origins, as attributed to other cargo cults, instead seeing cult followers as actors taking part in a theatrical drama to confuse the authorities.

== Geography ==
New Hanover is volcanic in structure. The inland areas are densely forested hinterland. The population follows a subsistence life-style, based on farming and fishing.

== Diving ==
New Hanover is a popular diving location, primarily because of the wrecks from World War II. Four Japanese vessels were sunk in Three Island Harbour in the north-west of the island on 16 February 1944.

== See also ==
- Johnson cult (so-called)
- List of volcanoes in Papua New Guinea
