= Kavieng =

Kavieng Bilas Peles
- Kavieng
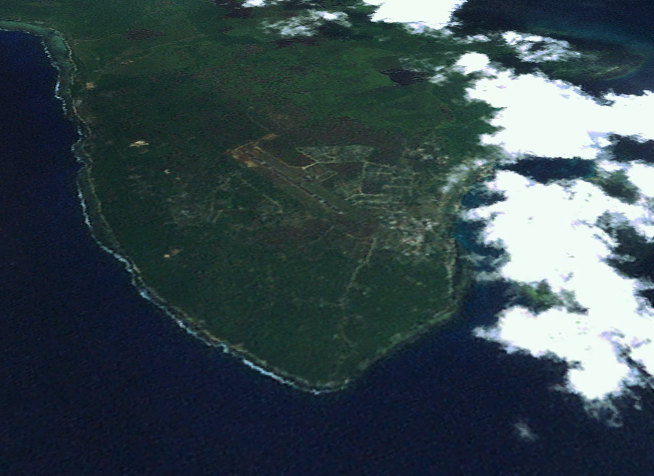
- Satellite image of the Kavieng peninsula

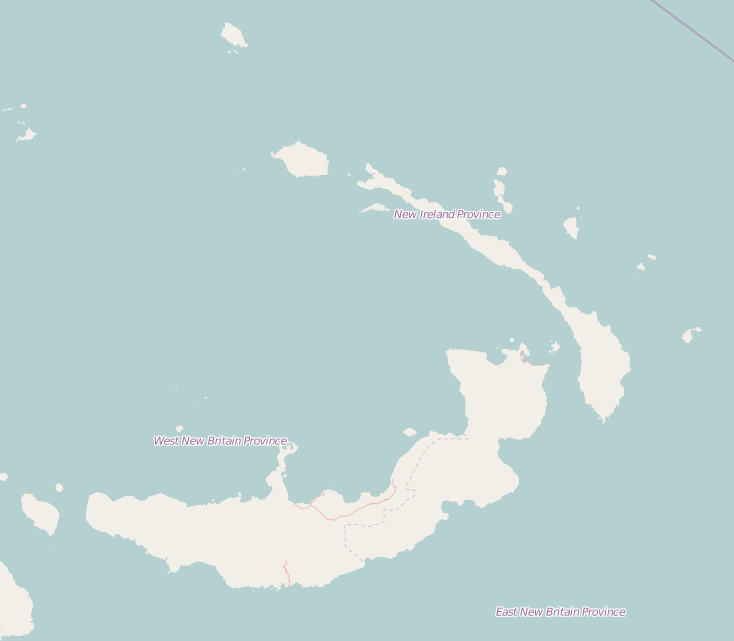
- Location within New Britain and Ireland
- Coordinates: 2°34′S 150°48′E
- Country: Papua New Guinea
- Province: New Ireland
- District: Kavieng District
- LLG: Kavieng Urban
- Founded: 1900
- Elevation: 10 m (33 ft)

Population (2012)
  - Total: 19,849
  - Rank: 14th

Languages
  - Main languages: Tok Pisin, English, New Ireland languages
  - Traditional language: Tigak, and some Tiang from Dyaul Island
- Time zone: UTC+10 (AEST)
- Mean max temp: 30.2 °C (86.4 °F)
- Mean min temp: 22.5 °C (72.5 °F)
- Annual rainfall: 3,183 mm (125.3 in)
- Climate: Af

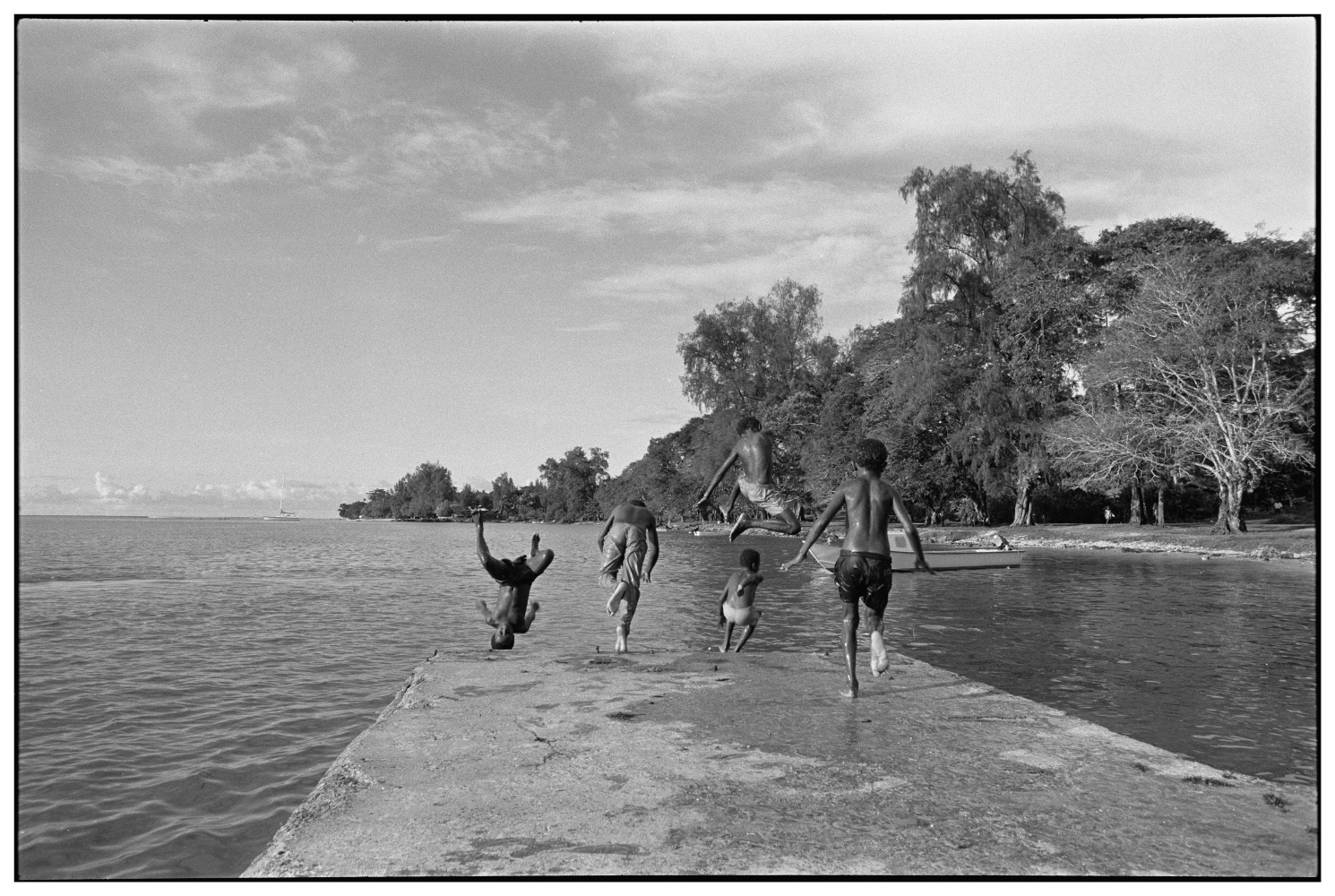
Children playing in Kavieng harbour

Kavieng is the capital of the Papua New Guinean province of New Ireland and the largest town on the island of the same name. The town is located at Balgai Bay, on the northern tip of the island. As of 2009, it had a population of 17,248.

Kavieng is the main port for New Ireland, and is both a trading and tourist destination. Several dive companies operate from the town, as the area is known for its diving, both for natural sites and wrecks dating from the Second World War. There are plane and shipwrecks in Kavieng Harbor itself, as well as several more nearby.

The town is serviced by Kavieng Airport, with daily connections to Port Moresby. It lies at one end of the Boluminski Highway which runs 293 kilometres (182 mi) of sealed road to Namatanai.

Kavieng has all the usual services of a local administrative center: local government offices; shopping; hotels (such as the Kavieng Hotel, the Malagan Beach Resort hotel and the Kavieng Club (the former "colonial club" in the town); a hospital providing general medical, pediatric and surgical services; and a weekly market. There is also a large wharf for copra export on the town's edge, which allow deep-water ships to load copra and oil directly from land.

Visible from Kavieng are the many islands of the archipelago lying between New Ireland and New Hanover, including Nusa Lik, Nusa Lawa, and Nango Island (which was formerly the site of a fish cannery in the 1960s and 1970s). Nango is also the site of a new marine research center for the PNG National Fisheries Authority. Its opening was overseen by the Governor-General of PNG, Mr. Paulius Matane, in July 2009.

== History ==
The area was first charted by Dutch explorers in 1616, but it was not until the early 1900s (decade) that Kavieng town was founded by the German colonial administration. Though some on the island became quite wealthy with the development of copra plantations, Kavieng itself remained a tiny settlement, with as few as eighty residents. After the First World War, Kavieng, as part of Papua New Guinea, was ceded to Australian control. This resulted in the deportation of German missionaries and the seizure of all German property in the town.

On 21 January 1942, during World War II, Kavieng came under a massive aerial bombardment by Japanese forces. That night, the vast majority of Australians were evacuated from New Ireland. The Japanese invaded and occupied the island on 24 January. Over the next two years, almost all of the Europeans who had remained on the island were killed by the Japanese. Rear Admiral Ryukichi Tamura gave the order to kill all the European prisoners in Kavieng if an imminent invasion by Allied forces was expected. At least twenty-three of these were executed in the Kavieng Wharf Massacre in March 1944, which later led to the perpetrators being sentenced for war crimes. By the time the Allies retook the island in 1945, Kavieng had been almost completely destroyed.

As a result of the Japanese occupation and subsequent Allied invasion there are a number of wartime relics in the town, most notably a large gun sitting above a bunker adjacent to the Harbour Road. Although not officially open to the public, the bunker has several openings allowing entry, and the gun position provides an extensive view of the harbor.

Today Kavieng is home to a thriving tourism industry. Dive, trekking, and surf tourism predominate with all of the tourism depending on the rich biological diversity of New Ireland. The surf tourism industry has entered into partnerships with local land and reef owners to develop what they refer to as a "surf management plan." This plan provides resource owners with income from the surfers and limits the number of surfers on any break at one time.

== Climate ==
Kavieng has a tropical rainforest climate (Köppen Af) with hot days, warm to very warm nights, and heavy rainfall year-round.

Climate data for Kavieng (1975–2007)
Month	Jan	Feb	Mar	Apr	May	Jun	Jul	Aug	Sep	Oct	Nov	Dec	Year
Mean daily maximum °C (°F)	30.7 (87.3)	30.6 (87.1)	30.8 (87.4)	30.8 (87.4)	30.8 (87.4)	30.6 (87.1)	30.4 (86.7)	30.5 (86.9)	31.0 (87.8)	31.1 (88.0)	31.1 (88.0)	30.7 (87.3)	30.8 (87.4)
Mean daily minimum °C (°F)	24.0 (75.2)	23.9 (75.0)	24.1 (75.4)	23.8 (74.8)	23.7 (74.7)	23.4 (74.1)	22.9 (73.2)	23.1 (73.6)	23.1 (73.6)	23.4 (74.1)	23.5 (74.3)	23.8 (74.8)	23.6 (74.4)
Average rainfall mm (inches)	312.6 (12.31)	294.6 (11.60)	325.8 (12.83)	280.0 (11.02)	253.0 (9.96)	209.4 (8.24)	246.6 (9.71)	202.0 (7.95)	171.6 (6.76)	213.9 (8.42)	210.2 (8.28)	265.0 (10.43)	2,984.7 (117.51)
Average rainy days	23	21	23	21	21	21	22	19	17	19	19	22	248
Source: World Meteorological Organization

== See also ==
- Kavieng Urban LLG
