= New Ireland (island) =

Island of the Bismarck Archipelago in the Pacific Ocean

Native name: Niu Ailan
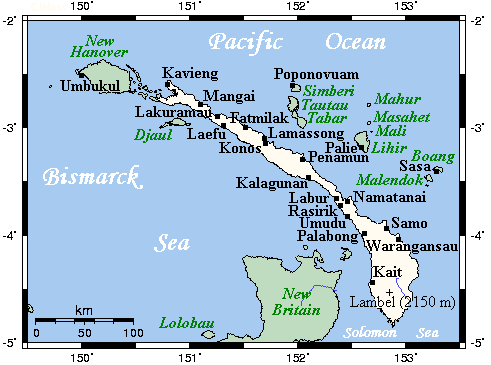
- New Ireland's main towns and nearby islands

- Location within Papua New Guinea

Geography
- Coordinates: 3.33°S 152°E
- Archipelago: Bismarck Archipelago
- Area: 7,404 km^{2} (2,859 sq mi)
- Length: 360 km (224 mi)
- Width: 10 km (6 mi) - 40 km (25 mi)
- Highest elevation: 2,340 m (7680 ft)
- Highest point: Mount Taron

Administration
- Papua New Guinea
- Province: New Ireland Province
- Largest settlement: Kavieng (pop. 10,600)

Demographics
- Population: 118,350 (2002)

New Ireland (Tok Pisin: Niu Ailan), or Latangai, is a large island in Papua New Guinea, approximately 7,404 km^{2} (2,859 sq mi) in area with c. 120,000 people. It is named after the island of Ireland. It is the largest island of New Ireland Province, lying northeast of the island of New Britain. Both islands are part of the Bismarck Archipelago, named after Otto von Bismarck, and they are separated by Saint George's Channel.

The administrative centre of the island and of New Ireland province is the town of Kavieng located at the northern end of the island. While the island was part of German New Guinea, it was named Neumecklenburg ("New Mecklenburg").

== Geography ==
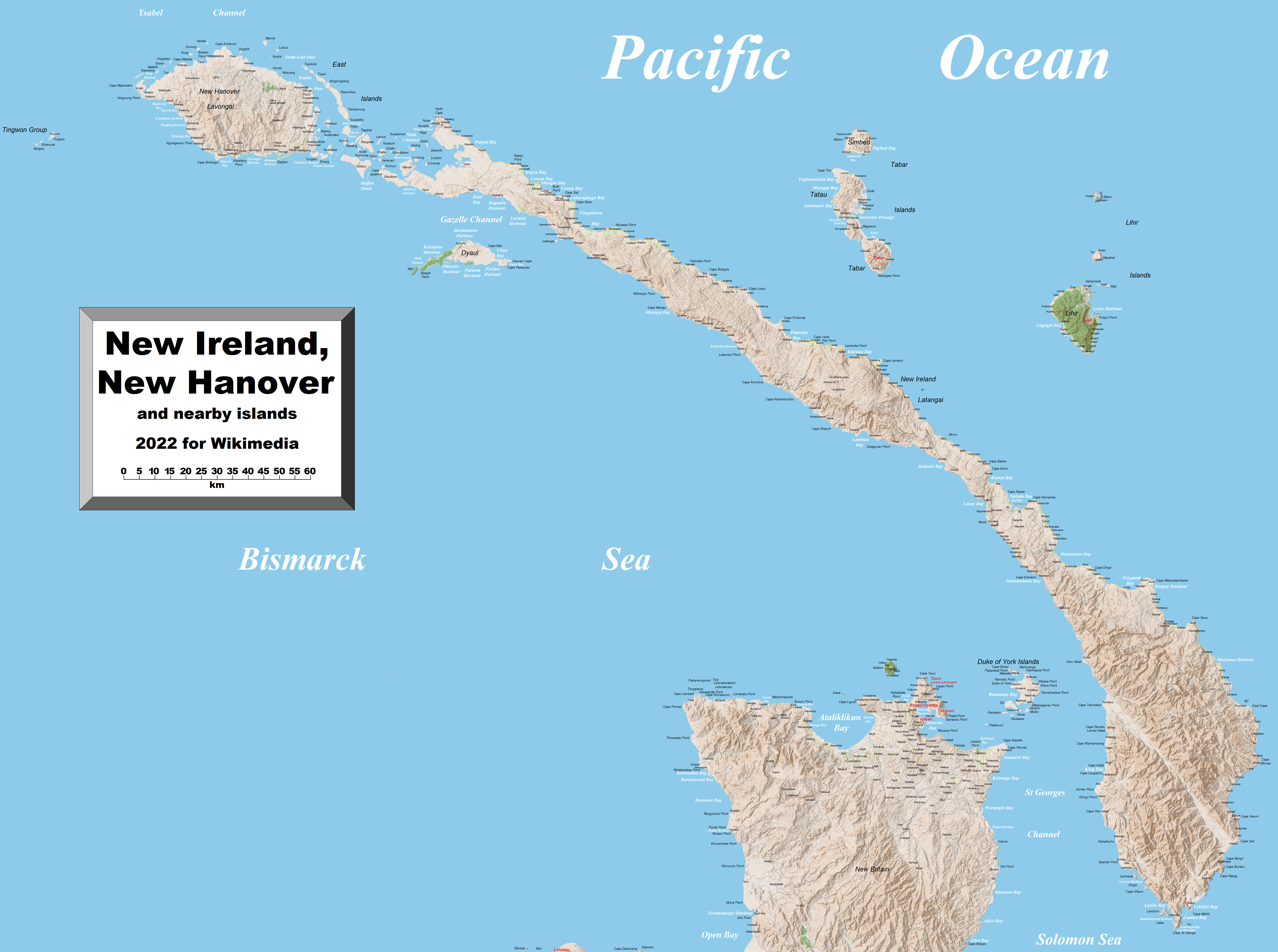
Detailed map of New Ireland and New Hanover

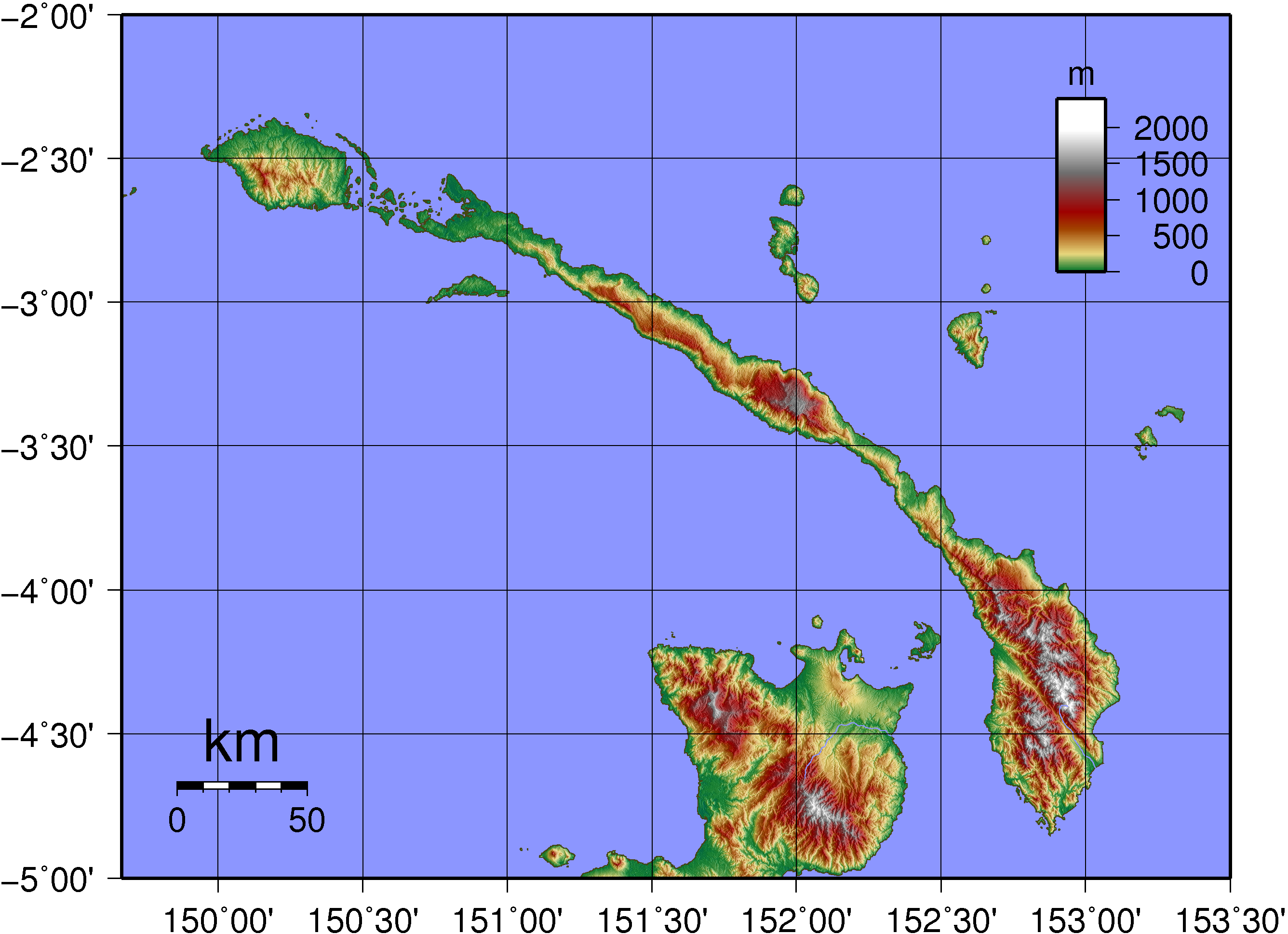
Topographic map of New Ireland

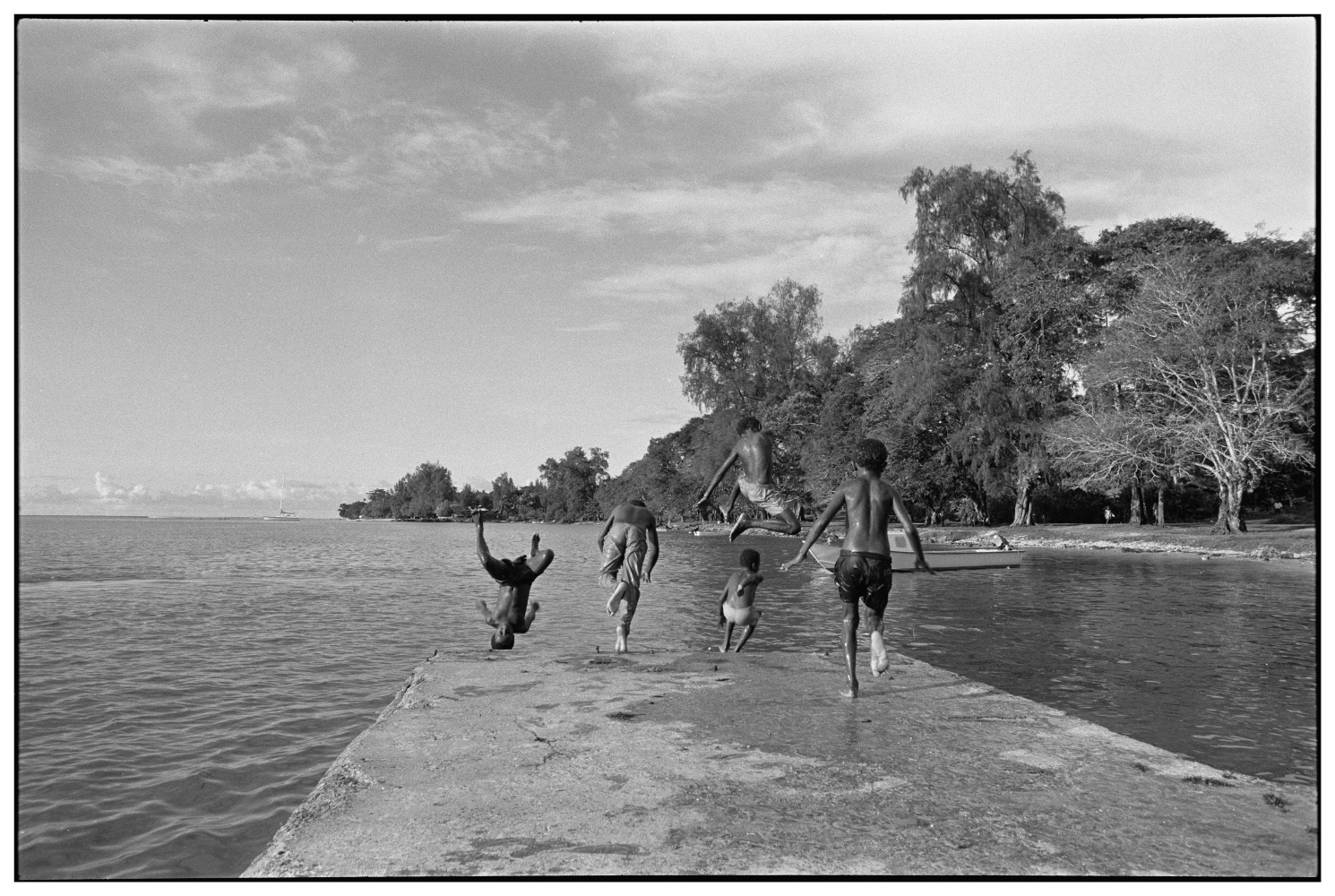
Children playing in Kavieng harbour, New Ireland

The island is part of the Bismarck Archipelago and is often described as having the shape of a musket. New Ireland is surrounded by the Bismarck Sea in the southwest and by the Pacific Ocean in the northeast.

For much of its 360 km (220 mi) in length, the island's width varies between less than 10 km (6.2 mi) to 40 km (25 mi), yet the central mountainous spine is very steep and rugged. The highest peak is Mount Taron in the Hans Meyer Range (2,340 m, 7,680 ft). Other mountain ranges are Tirpitz, Schleinitz, Verron and Rossel. The island lies between two and five degrees south of the equator. The original land cover was primarily dense rainforest.

== History ==
=== Pre-colonial period ===
The first inhabitants of the Bismarck Archipelago arrived around 33,000 years ago after sailing from what is now Papua New Guinea. Later arrivals included the Lapita people approximately 3,000 years ago. Three distinct cultural practices are characteristic of the native people of New Ireland: Kabai, Malagan and Tubuan.

=== Colonial period ===
In 1616 the Dutch sailors Jacob Le Maire and Willem Schouten were the first Europeans to set foot on the island, but it was only recognized as part of an island separate from New Guinea by William Dampier in 1700. Philip Carteret recognized it as separate from New Britain (then New Pomerania) in 1767, and Louis Antoine de Bougainville anchored here eleven months later, on 6 July 1768.

Whaling ships often called at the island in the 19th century, for water, wood and provisions. The first recorded whaler to visit was the Resource in 1799. Islanders sometimes served as crewmen on these vessels. The last known whaling visitor was the Belvedere in 1884.

In the 1870s and 1880s, the Marquis de Rays, a French nobleman, attempted to establish a French colony on the island called New France. He sent four ill-fated expeditions to the island, the most famous of which caused the death of 123 settlers.

From 1885 to 1914 New Ireland was a part of German New Guinea and bore the name Neumecklenburg. Germans managed several highly profitable copra plantations and built a road to transport the goods. This road is currently in service and is named the Boluminski Highway after the German administrator of German New Guinea, Franz Boluminski. After World War I, Neumecklenburg was renamed New Ireland and was controlled by Australia under a League of Nations mandate. In January 1942, during World War II, the island was captured by Japanese forces and was under their control.

== Ecology ==
The island is part of two ecoregions. The New Britain–New Ireland lowland rain forests extend from sea level to 1000 meters elevation. The New Britain-New Ireland montane rain forests cover the mountains of New Ireland above 1000 meters elevation.

Widespread deforestation and degradation of lowland rainforest is an issue on New Ireland and the other eastern islands of Papua New Guinea (New Britain, Bougainville Island) as well as on Papua New Guinea mainland. Nearly 60% of their forests are accessible to logging, and by 2002, 63% of the accessible forests had been deforested or degraded.

The island hosts 8 endemic landbirds, some of these only rarely documented scientifically. An additional 18 near-endemic landbirds are shared only with the adjacent islands of New Britain and New Hanover Island.

== Culture ==
- Malagan – funerary arts that originate in Tabar Group, and have been imported to the northern region of New Ireland.
- Tatanua – "The person who organises a tatanua performance must select the music and dancers, assemble a male chorus and acquire the masks. The masks are usually rented from one of the sculptors who makes them."
- Kulap – chalk limestone funerary sculptures.
