= New Ireland Province =

Province of Papua New Guinea

New Ireland Niu Ailan (Tok Pisin)
- Province
- Flag

- Location of New Ireland in Papua New Guinea
- Colony of German Empire: 3 November 1884
- Australian occupation: 17 September 1914
- Mandate of Australia: 1920/21
- Union with the Territory of Papua: 1 July 1949
- Province of Papua New Guinea: 9 September 1975
- Capital and largest city: Kavieng
- Administration: 10 local level government areas

Government
  - Type: Constitutional monarchy Parliamentary democracy
  - Body: New Ireland Provincial Government
  - Governor: James Byron Chan
  - Deputy Governor: Sammy Missen
- Legislature: Unicameral house: Parliament of New Ireland Legislative Assembly (10 seats)
- Federal representation: National Parliament of Papua New Guinea: Unicameral house 2/111

Area
  - Land: 9,557 km^{2} (3,690 sq mi)
- Highest elevation (Mount Taron): 2,340 m (7,680 ft)

Population (2024 census)
  - Total: 237,780
  - Rank: 18th
  - Density: 24.88/km^{2} (64.44/sq mi)
  - Rank: 6th
- Demonym: New Irelander
- Time zone: UTC+10 (PGT)
- ISO 3166 code: PG-NIK
- HDI (2019): 0.598 medium · 4th of 22

New Ireland Province, formerly New Mecklenburg (German: Neu-Mecklenburg), and Nova Hibernia, is the northeasternmost province of Papua New Guinea.

== Physical geography ==
The largest island of the province is New Ireland.

Also part of the province are numerous smaller islands, including Saint Matthias Group (Mussau, Emirau), New Hanover, Djaul, Tabar Group (Tabar, Tatau, Simberi), Lihir, Tanga Group (Malendok, Boang) and Feni Islands (Ambitle, Babase) commonly called Anir Islands.

The land area of the province is around 9,560 km^{2} (3,690 sq mi). The sea area within the Exclusive Economic Zone (EEZ) of New Ireland Province is around 230,000 km^{2} (89,000 sq mi).

== Ecology ==
In the early days of the French Revolution while searching for a lost scientific expedition the vessel La Recherche passed by New Ireland. On board was the prominent botanist Jacques-Julien Houtou de Labillardière who noted in his journal fine stands of teak (Tectona grandis) trees growing at the southern end of the island. This marks the easternmost occurrence of teak, an important timber tree that extends naturally from India to Thailand on the Asian mainland and also is present on Java in the Indonesian archipelago.

== History ==
There have been at least three waves of migration into New Ireland over the last 40,000 years. The Lapita pottery culture was present around 3,300 years ago.

Chinese and South-East Asian contact appears to have been longstanding, though the evidence is thin.

Dutch explorers made the first European contact in 1616. It was initially believed by Europeans to be part of New Britain, but the British explorer Philip Carteret established in 1767 that the island was physically separate, and gave it the name Nova Hibernia, Latin for 'New Ireland'.

In the 1870s and 1880s, Marquis de Rays, a French nobleman, attempted to establish a French colony on the island called La Nouvelle France. He sent four ill-fated expeditions to the island, the most notable of which was the third attempt, now known simply as the De Rays Expedition, which caused the death of 123 of the 350 or so settlers.

German residence, Kavieng Neu-Mecklenburg pre-1914 when German New Guinea was seized by Australia.

Government House, Port Moresby, in the early 1900s before Australia took administration of British New Guinea and changed its name to Papua.

Missionary activity did not begin until 1877, and New Ireland was colonised by Germany in 1886 under the name Neu-Mecklenburg, as part of the German partition comprising the northern half of present-day Papua New Guinea.

Blackbirding, the removal, often by force, of local young men to work on plantations in northern Australia and other Pacific islands, was widespread in New Ireland in the late 19th century, especially from Lihir Island and the Tanga Islands.

Australia took control in 1914, in the early stages of World War I, and renamed the island New Ireland after the island of Ireland. It became part of the Mandated Territory of New Guinea declared in 1921 by the League of Nations and administered by Australia.

During World War II, New Ireland was occupied by Japanese forces from January 1942 to September 1945.

Australian colonial administration continued until Papua New Guinea became independent in September 1975.

The core of New Ireland's economy is agriculture, livestock, and forestry and marine products. Additionally, there is significant gold mining activity, particularly in Lihir and Simberi.

== Human geography ==
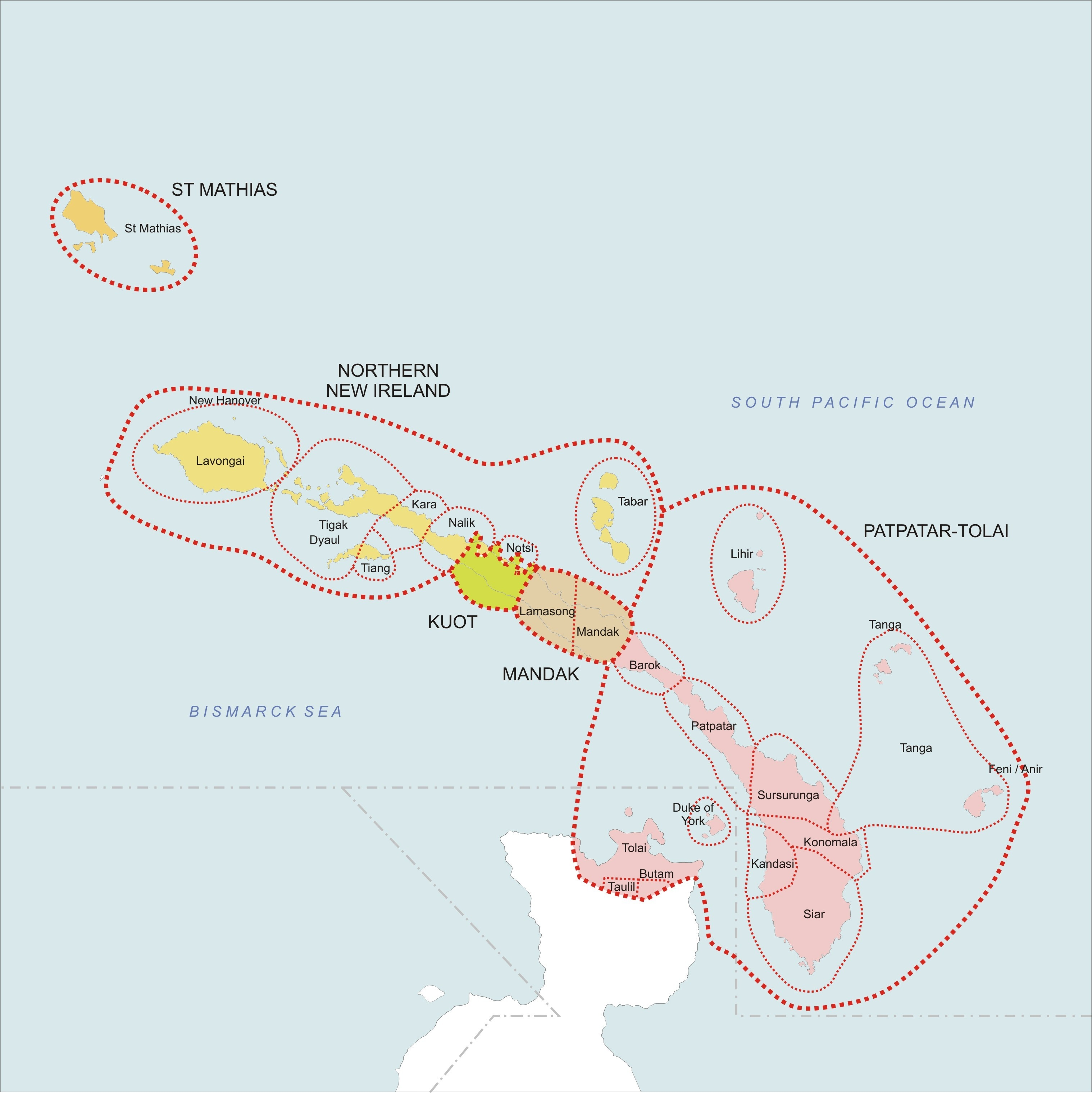
Languages of New Ireland Province

The population during the year 2000 census was 118,350 people, the vast majority of whom (about 90%) live in small rural villages. The population is very young, with a median age of 18.7 years. Over 40% of the population is under the age of 15 years, whereas only 3% is above 65 years old.

The provincial capital is Kavieng, located on the main island's northern tip. Namatanai is another small town two-thirds of the way along the island. The Boluminski Highway runs down the east coast, linking the two towns.

Around twenty languages are spoken in New Ireland, and the number of dialects and subdialects totals perhaps 45. All are in the New Ireland languages group within the Austronesian language family, except for one language isolate, Kuot.

== Culture ==
New Ireland, like much of Papua New Guinea, has a mixture of the old and the new: traditional cultural practices ("custom") are widespread and almost universally respected, yet society is changing as a result of church activity, urbanisation, and various aspects of global contemporary culture making their mark.

Probably the most famous cultural system of New Ireland is "Malagan", a Nalik word for an ancient and revered set of practices and ceremonies practised throughout much of the main island. Malagan is also an art where the dead are remembered through the various depictions that are carved on Malagan masks. The Malagan masks have a symbolic meaning as the dead must be remembered through the masks and ceremonies. They are the practical means of capturing the spirits of recent dead relatives or clan members. During the colonial era, significant quantities of Malagan masks were collected by European administrators and can be seen in museums all over Europe.

== Districts and LLGs ==
District map of New Ireland Province

Each province in Papua New Guinea has one or more districts, and each district has one or more Local Level Government (LLG) areas. For census purposes, the LLG areas are subdivided into wards and those into census units.

District	District Capital	LLG Name
Kavieng District	Kavieng	Kavieng Urban
Kavieng District	Kavieng	Lavongai Rural
Kavieng District	Kavieng	Murat Rural
Kavieng District	Kavieng	Tikana Rural
Namatanai District	Namatanai	Konoagil Rural
Namatanai District	Namatanai	Namatanai Rural
Namatanai District	Namatanai	Matalai Rural
Namatanai District	Namatanai	Nimamar Rural
Namatanai District	Namatanai	Sentral Niu Ailan Rural
Namatanai District	Namatanai	Tanir Rural

== Provincial leaders ==
The province was governed by a decentralised provincial administration, headed by a Premier, from 1977 to 1995. Following reforms taking effect that year, the national government reassumed some powers, and the role of Premier was replaced by the position of Governor, to be held by the winner of the province-wide seat in the National Parliament of Papua New Guinea.

=== Premiers (1977–1995) ===
Premier	Term
Robert Seeto	1977–1986
Pedi Anis	1987–1990
Demas Kavuvu	1990–1993
Samson Gila	1993–1995

=== Governors (1995–present) ===
Governor	Term
Wilson Peni	1995–1997
Paul Tohian	1997–2002
Ian Ling-Stuckey	2002–2007
Julius Chan	2007–2025
Walter Schnaubelt	2025–present

== Members of the National Parliament ==
The province and each district are represented by a Member of the National Parliament. There is one provincial electorate, and each district is an open electorate.

Electorate	Member
New Ireland Provincial	Julius Chan
Kavieng Open	Ian Ling-Stuckey
Namatanai Open	Walter Schnaubelt

== See also ==
- Borpop Airfield, Japanese facility during World War Two
- Matatai
