= Freedom Lecture =

Annual debate at Masaryk University, Brno, Czech Republic

The Freedom Lecture is a public debate on a current social topic with outstanding personalities that has been held annually at the Masaryk University in Brno, Czech Republic on the occasion of International Students´ Day (Student Seventeen). The tradition of the debates was established in 2014, in the year of the 25th anniversary of the Velvet Revolution in Prague in November 1989. The Freedom Lecture is organized in remembrance of students and professors around the world whose lives were extinguished by aggressors. The main aim of the Freedom Lecture is to inspire creativity and promote active citizenship while helping students realize their dreams and encourage their efforts for a better and more peaceful world. Founders of the Charta 77 Foundation František Janouch and Ada Kolman or the German activist Rainer Höss with the Israeli journalist Tal Bashan have participated in the debates. The Freedom Lecture is organized by the Masaryk University and the Alumni and Friends of Masaryk University in the University Cinema Scala in Brno.

== History ==
The tradition of the debates was established in 2014, in the year of the 25th anniversary of the Velvet Revolution in Prague in November 1989. Alumni and Friends of Masaryk University invited the founders of the Charta 77 Foundation František Janouch and Ada Kolman from Stockholm, Sweden. The main goal was to show the history of the foundation and how dissidents in Czechoslovakia were supported from Sweden between 1978 and 1990. The 2015 Freedom Lecture took place on the 70th anniversary of the end of the World War II, in connection with the Year of Reconciliation initiative organized by the City of Brno. The debate between the German activist Rainer Höss, the grandson of Rudolf Höss, the commandant of the concentration camp Auschwitz-Birkenau and the Israeli journalist Tal Bashan, the daughter of Ruth Bondy, the writer who survived imprisonment in several Nazi concentration camps, focused on the topic of Humanity vs Barbarity.

The Freedom Lecture is organized by Martin Glogar, Dušan Fiala and Petr Dimitrov from the Masaryk University and Don Sparling from Alumni and Friends of Masaryk University. The Freedom Lectures have been held in the University Cinema Scala in Brno. Debates are supported by the Theodor Herzl Distinguished Chair at the Masaryk University.

== Debates & speakers ==
Nr	Date	Debates	Speakers	Notes
1	November 17, 2014	Freedom & Solidarity	František Janouch & Ada Kolman: founders of the Charta 77 Foundation	
Dedicated to nine student representatives executed by the Nazis in Prague on 17 November 1939 and to the 25th anniversary of the Velvet Revolution in Prague in November 1989.
2	November 17, 2015	Humanity vs Barbarity	Rainer Höss: German activist, the grandson of Rudolf Höss, the commandant of the concentration camp Auschwitz-Birkenau Tal Bashan: Israeli journalist, the daughter of Ruth Bondy, the writer who survived imprisonment in several Nazi concentration camps and the holocaust	
Dedicated to the 70th anniversary of the end of the World War II, to the Year of Reconciliation initiative organized by the City of Brno and to the revival of Czech-German Christian-Jewish roots and traditions in Brno.
