= Janouch =

Janouch (feminine: Janouchová) is a Czech surname. It is derived from the given name Jan. Notable people with the surname include:

- František Janouch (1931–2024), Czech nuclear physicist
- Jakub Janouch (born 1990), Czech volleyball player
- Katerina Janouch (born 1964), Czech-Swedish author
