= Terese Alvén =

Swedish health writer and blogger (1982–2019)

Marie Terese Alvén
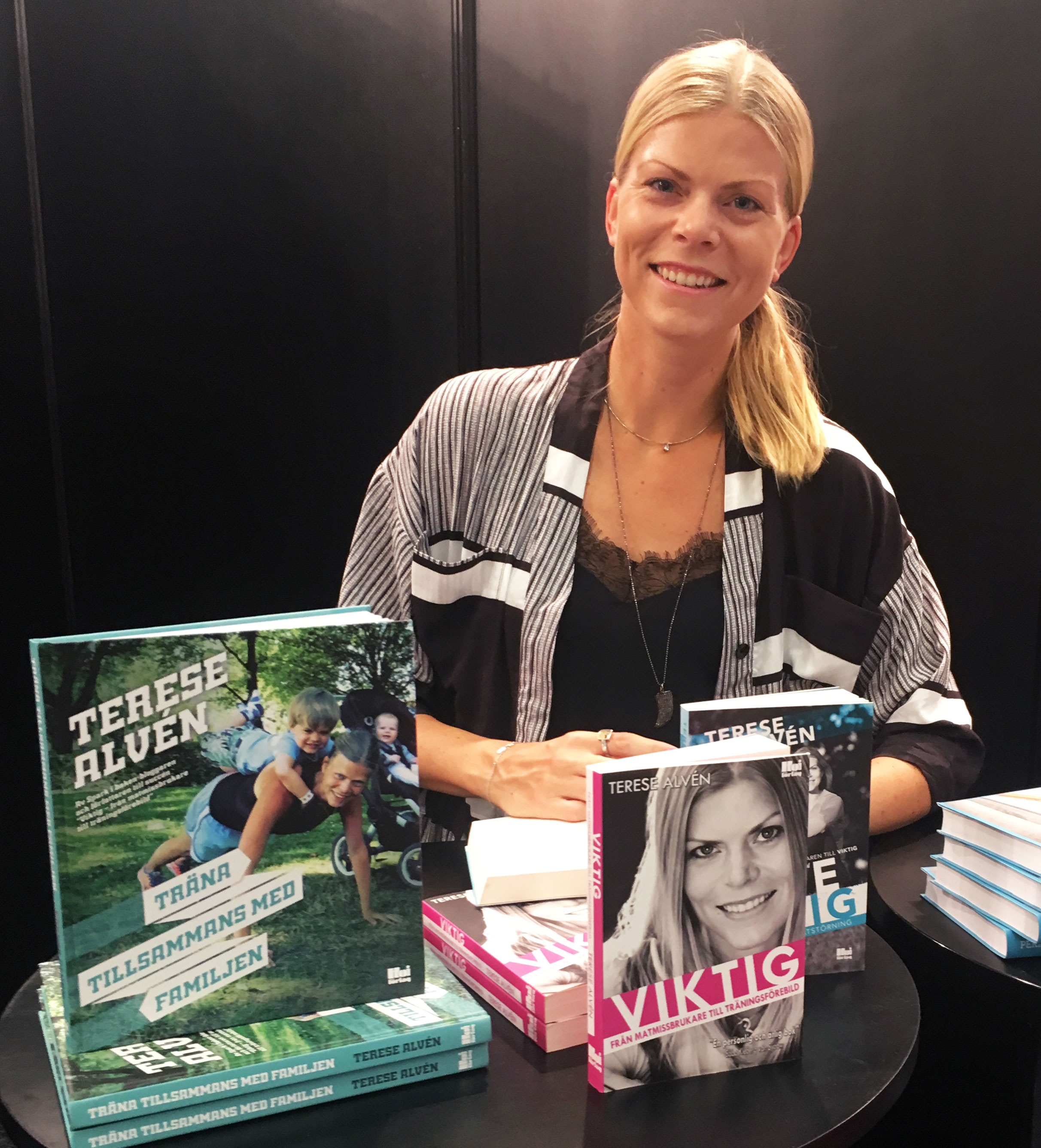
- Terese Alvén in 2016
- Born: June 5, 1982; Sweden
- Died: June 11, 2019 (aged 37); Sweden
- Occupations: Writer, blogger, lecturer
- Known for: Health and fitness blogging
- Notable work: Spark i baken (blog)
- Spouse: Glenn Boström
- Awards: Health Profile of the Year, Guldäpplet (Hälsa magazine); Best Workout Blog (Cosmopolitan, 2009)

Marie Terese Alvén, (5 June 1982 - 11 June 2019) was a Swedish writer and blogger about health.

Terese Alvén was one of Sweden's first workout bloggers when she started the blog Spark i baken in 2007. After being featured as a health and workout blogger for one year in the women's magazine Amelia internet site, she returned to blogging on her own platform in her own name in August 2017.

In June 2017, she was named as Top 10 of Sweden's best health bloggers by the magazine SportHälsa. Alvén also was the winner in the categories, "Health profile of the Year" and "Guldäpplet" by the magazine Hälsa. In 2009, her blog Spark i baken was voted as the best workout blog by the readers of the magazine Cosmopolitan.

Besides the blogging, she was also a lecturer in the subjects of health, workouts with family, and she also talked about body image. She also wrote several books about workouts and how to stay healthy.

She was married to Glenn Boström until her death in 2019. She died in June 2019, after suffering from ovarian cancer.

== Bibliography ==
- 2013 – Viktig: från matmissbrukare till träningsförebild (Hoi förlag), ISBN 9789186775414
- 2014 – Träna tillsammans med familjen, (Hoi förlag), ISBN 9789175579139
- 2015 – Träna tillsammans med Tia (Idus förlag), ISBN 9789175772257
- 2016 – Jätteviktig: att må bra efter en ätstörning (Hoi förlag), ISBN 9789176970010
- 2019 – Rörelserik: 52 utmaningar som får igång hela familjen (Ehrlin Publishing), ISBN 9789188375827
