= Brydolf =

Brydolf is a Swedish surname. Notable people with the surname include:

- Märtha Brydolf (1868–1956), Swedish politician and journalist
- Nathalie Brydolf (born 1995), Swedish singer
- Patrik Brydolf (born 1991), Swedish tennis player
