= Jiří Ignác Linek =

Czech late-Baroque composer and pedagogue

- Born: 21 January 1725; Bakov nad Jizerou, Kingdom of Bohemia
- Died: 30 December 1791; Bakov nad Jizerou, Kingdom of Bohemia
- Occupation(s): Bohemian late-Baroque composer and pedagogue

Jiří Ignác Línek (21 January 1725 – 30 December 1791) was a Czech late-Baroque composer and pedagogue, said to have composed over 300 works in his lifetime. He is especially noted for his Christmas pastorals and for his initiation of a literary brotherhood within Bohemia.

== Life ==
He was born at Bakov nad Jizerou, Bohemia. In the period official register, his name was entered as Linka, but he always signed himself Linek. He studied at the Piarist gymnasium in Kosmonosy; later, he studied composition with Josef Seger. From 1747 to his death, he was a teacher, choirmaster and member of the literary fraternity in Bakov nad Jizerou. He died of tuberculosis; his gravesite is unknown.

== Style ==
Most of Linek's music was composed for the church. His favorite instrument was the harpsichord. Many of his religious works were composed on Czech texts. He composed at least thirty pastorals, Easter sepolcros, as well as devotional pieces dedicated to St. John Nepomucene.
