= Märtha Brydolf =

Swedish politician and journalist

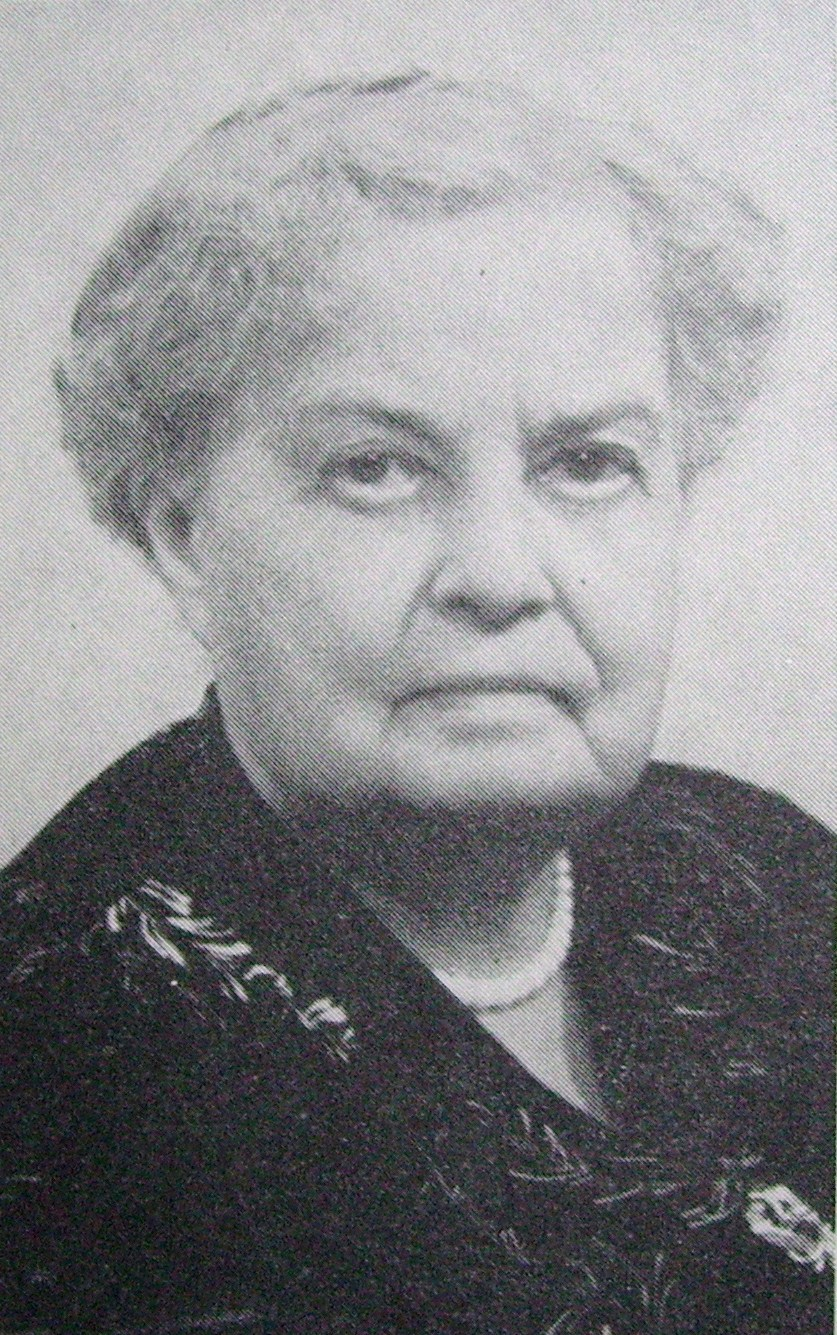
- Born: Märtha Sofia Elisabeth Forssblad; 21 March 1868 near Hjo, Sweden
- Died: 29 March 1956 (aged 88); Kristinehamn, Sweden
- Occupations: Politician, journalist

Märtha Sofia Elisabeth Brydolf (21 March 1868 – 29 March 1956) was a Swedish politician and journalist.

The daughter of Jacob Forssblad and Augusta Carlberg, she was born Märtha Sofia Elisabeth Forssblad on a farm near Hjo. At first, she was schooled at home but then attended elementary school in Jönköping. The family farm was sold in 1882 and the whole family moved to Jönköping. Her mother died when she was sixteen. She studied languages in France and Switzerland and then went to England, where she pursued further studies in languages and worked as a governess. She returned to Jönköping when she was 21 and taught English and French at the girls' school. She also translated news stories and wrote articles for regional newspapers including Göteborgs Handels- och Sjöfartstidning and Stockholms-Tidningen. She also contributed to weekly journals such as Husmodern, Idun and Vårt Hem.

In 1898, she married Erik Brydolf, a doctor. They moved to Kristinehamn that same year. The couple had four children. Her husband later died in 1939.

She returned to work as a journalist in 1910. In 1916, she established a women's group associated with the right-wing party Allmänna valmansförbundet (AVF) in Kristinehamn, which later became the national women's organization Nationalförbundet för Värmlands Kvinnoklubb. She served as its first chair. She was chair of the Länskvinnoråd ("Regional women's council") from 1919 to 1942. Brydolf was elected to the first board of the Central Kvinnoråd ("Central women's council") of the AVF in 1921 and later served as its vice-chair.

She was also chair of the local Red Cross and of the Kristinehamn Husmodersförening ("Housewives' association") in Kristinehamn. She was elected to the Kristinehamn municipal council in 1922, serving until 1938.

In 1949, Brydolf moved to a retirement home in Kristinehamn. She died there at the age of 88.
