= Carl Emil Pettersson =

Swedish sailor (1875–1937)

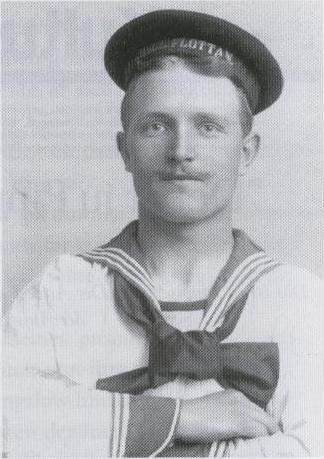
- Pettersson, 1890s
- Born: 23 October 1875; Sweden
- Died: 12 May 1937 (aged 61); Sydney, Australia
- Occupation: Sailor
- Title: King of Tabar Island
- Term: 1907–1922
- Predecessor: Lemy I
- Successor: None
- Opponent: King of Tabar Island
- Spouses: Singdo Lamis (m. 1907; died 1921) Jessie Louisa Simpson (m. 1923)
- Children: 9

Carl Emil Pettersson (23 October 1875 – 12 May 1937) was a Swedish sailor. He became king of Tabar Island in Papua New Guinea after he was shipwrecked there in 1904.

== Early life ==
Pettersson was one of six children of Carl Wilhelm and Johanna Pettersson. His father left the family, and Carl went to sea around 1892, at about age 17. Around 1898, he ended up in the Bismarck Archipelago of German New Guinea, where he worked for the German trading house, Neuguinea-Compagnie, headquartered in Kokopo.

== Shipwreck ==
On a recruiting trip in the Pacific, Pettersson's vessel, the Herzog Johan Albrecht (Duke Johan Albrecht), sank on Christmas Day 1904, off Tabar Island in New Ireland Province. He washed ashore near a village and ended up in a hibiscus hedge, where he was immediately surrounded by islanders. The islanders carried him to their king, Lamy. The king's daughter, Princess Singdo, fell in love with him, and in 1907 they married.

He entered the copra trade and created a coconut plantation that he called Teripax. He became king after the death of his father-in-law. His nickname among the locals was "Strong Charley", for his famed physical strength. Swedish and German newspapers printed a series of stories about Pettersson and his adventures.

== Later life ==
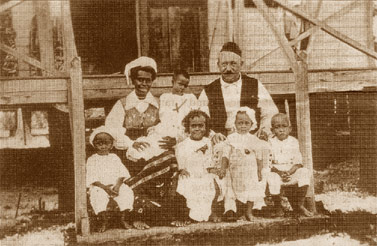
Pettersson with his family c. 1918

He added two plantations, Maragon on Simberi Island and later Londolovit on Lihir Group islands. Pettersson was respectful of local customs and showed concern for his employees, which was unusual at the time. He was popular with locals. His marriage with Singdo produced nine children, one of whom died in infancy. His wife died in 1921 of puerperal fever.

In 1922, Pettersson travelled to Sweden, partly to look for a new wife who could look after his children. There, he visited his old friend Birger Mörner whom he had met in the South Pacific. He met Anglo-Swedish Jessie Louisa Simpson; together they returned to Tabar Island, where they married in 1923. In Pettersson's absence, the plantation had declined, and he approached bankruptcy. He and Jessie both suffered from malaria. He painstakingly rebuilt his plantation, complicated by bad investments and failing market conditions.

Pettersson found a gold deposit on Simberi Island that he kept secret for years. The Tabar Group of islands developed into one of the world's largest gold deposits. His fortunes restored, he decided to leave the island. His wife Jessie traveled ahead to Australia for medical treatment and then returned to Sweden. She died in Stockholm from malaria and cancer on 19 May 1935. Pettersson's health also deteriorated.

Pettersson left Tabar in 1935 but never returned to Sweden. He died of a heart attack in Sydney, Australia, on 12 May 1937.

== In popular culture ==
Pettersson became a popular figure in Swedish mass media in the 1930s, and his life was frequently featured in women's magazines of the period such as Husmodern and Vecko-Journalen.

Carl Pettersson is regarded as the inspiration for Ephraim Longstocking, Pippi's father in Astrid Lindgren's Pippi Longstocking children's book series. In 2012, screenwriter Jorn Rossing Jensen reported that Swedish producer Mirijam Johansson, of Sweden's Wanted Pictures, announced at Cannes that she had acquired the rights to Efraim Longstocking and the Cannibal Princess, a film based on a screenplay by Daniel Fridell and Ulf Stark and approved by Saltkråkan, the latter of which holds Lindgren's rights.
