= Karel Chodounský =

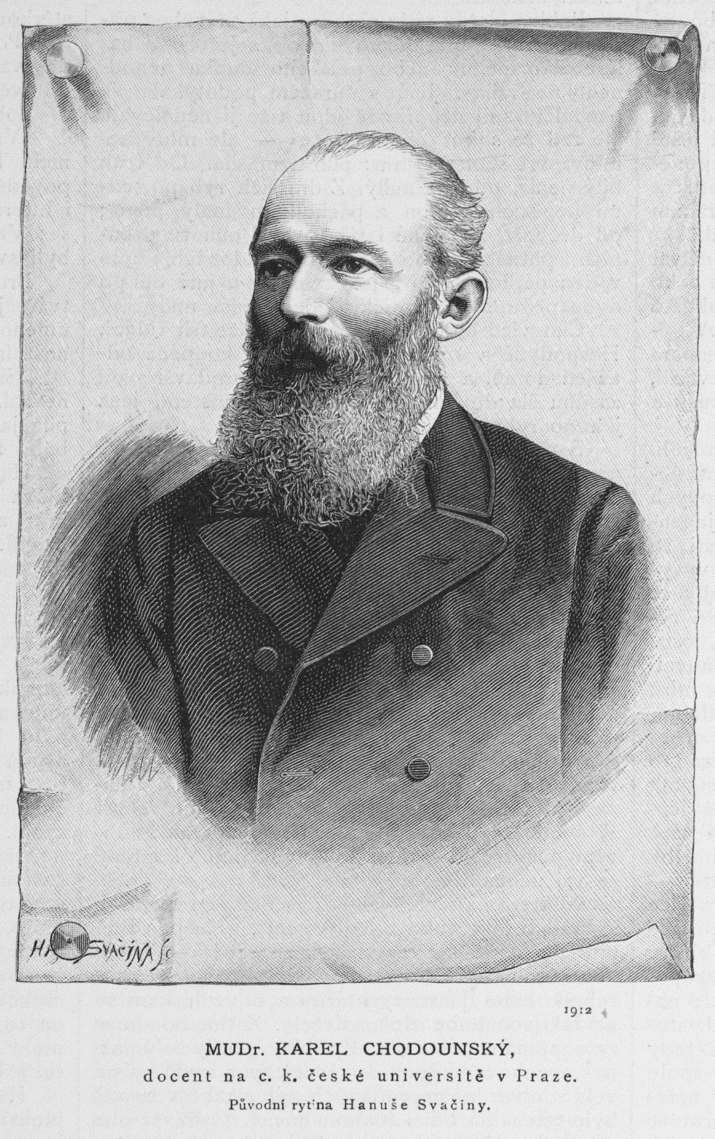

Karel Chodounský (Latin: Carolus Josephus Petrus Chodounsky; 18 May 1843 – 12 May 1931) was a Czech medical doctor, pharmacologist and promoter of mountaineering. He was the founding professor at the institute of pharmacology at Masaryk University. He is known as the author of the first Czech pharmacology textbook called Farmakologie, printed in 1905.

== Life and work ==
Chodounský was born on 18 May 1843 in Studénka, Bohemia, Austrian Empire (today part of Bakov nad Jizerou, Czech Republic) to estate administrator Petr and Julia née Svobodová. He studied medicine at the University of Prague in 1868, also spending time in the natural history museum. He worked as an assistant in physiology under Jan Evangelista Purkyně. He worked as a medical doctor, practicing privately until 1895 and in 1884 he became an assistant professor of balneotherapy. He habilitated in pharmacology and toxicology in 1888 and became an associate professor in 1895. He headed the institute of pharmacology at Prague and received a doctorate in 1900 and became a full professor of pharmacology in 1902. Chodounský demonstrated by experiments that he conducted on himself that infectious colds had nothing to do with low temperatures. He wrote about this in his 1907 book Erkältung und Erkältungskrankheiten. In 1919 he was involved in establishing pharmacology at the Masaryk University, Brno, and served there until 1923.

Chodounský was a champion skater and took a keen interest in mountaineering. He was involved in the establishment of the Slovenian Alpine Society in Prague in 1897, serving as its president until 1914. He promoted the training of alpine guides, the opening of trails, and the publication of books on mountaineering. In 1901 he founded a society to support Slovenian students in Prague. He edited the Czech medical periodical Časopis lékařů českých (1878–1888) and for his contributions he received a Knight's Cross of Emperor Franz Joseph. He was also awarded an honorary doctorate in 1929 by Masaryk University.

He died on 12 May 1931 in Prague, aged 87.

His daughter Marie Chodounská (died 1922) became an artist.
