= Jan Špaček =

Czech molecular biologist and astrobiologist

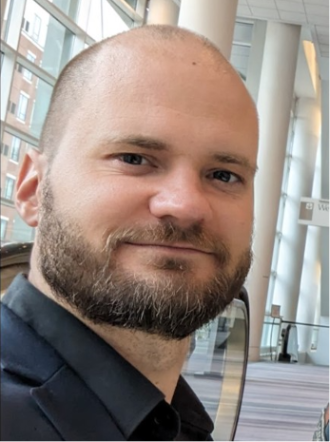
- Špaček in 2025
- Born: 16 June 1986 (age 40); Ostrava, Czechoslovakia
- Education: Masaryk University
- Known for: IMPRESS Mars Penetrators, Organic Carbon Cycle on Venus, Agnostic Life Finder (ALF)
- Scientific career
- Fields: Molecular biology, analytical chemistry, astrobiology
- Workplaces: Foundation for Applied Molecular Evolution, IMPRESS Spaceworks Co.
- Website: impressmars.com, alfamars.org

Jan Špaček (born 16 June 1986) is a Czech molecular biologist, analytical chemist and astrobiologist. He is based in Florida, United States and is a senior research scientist at the Foundation for Applied Molecular Evolution (FfAME) and the founder and CEO of both IMPRESS Spaceworks Co. and the Agnostic Life Finding Association Inc. The former develops planetary penetrators to deliver science experiments to Mars, while the latter focuses on promoting the search for life on Mars. His work focuses on life detection technologies, planetary chemistry, and the development of instrumentation for space missions. Špaček is known for proposing an Organic Carbon Cycle in the atmosphere of Venus and for inventing the Agnostic Life Finder (ALF) instrument to screen Martian water for known or alien genetic polymers.

== Early life and education ==
Špaček was born in Ostrava, Czechoslovakia. He earned all his academic degrees from Masaryk University in Brno. He received a B.Sc. in Molecular Biology and Genetics in 2009, an M.Sc. in 2011, and a Ph.D. in Genomics and Proteomics in 2018, where he undertook several international internships and visiting scholar positions.

== Early research (2008–2020) ==
From 2008 to 2020, Špaček was a member of the Department of Biophysical Chemistry and Molecular Oncology at the Institute of Biophysics, Academy of Sciences of the Czech Republic. Concurrently, from 2011 to 2020, he was affiliated with the Department of Structure and Interaction of Biomolecules at Surfaces at CEITEC, Masaryk University. His early research focused on the electrochemical characterization of nucleic acids, including natural, modified, and unnatural nucleic acids. He developed an electrochemical "footprinting" technique to study DNA-protein interactions and developed a new method for electrochemical detection of unnatural base pairs in DNA, sensitive enough to detect single unnatural bases in plasmids from semi-synthetic organisms.

== U.S. collaborations and shift to astrobiology ==
During his time at UC San Diego in 2018–2019, Špaček advanced his studies of natural nucleotides and unnatural nucleosides, leading to collaboration with synthetic biology pioneer Steven Benner. He later joined Benner's lab (Firebird Biomolecular Sciences) as a Senior Research Scientist in 2020, and began working at FfAME in 2023. In 2025, Špaček founded IMPRESS Spaceworks Co., where he serves as CEO, to develop the International Mars Prospecting Ride-Share System (IMPRESS), a distributed Mars exploration architecture based on planetary penetrators.

Since 2021, Špaček has been involved in Venusian atmospheric research. He originally proposed an organic carbon cycle to account for observations unexplained in current models, such as a strong UV-blue absorber. In subsequent laboratory work, Špaček and colleagues reported that formaldehyde and carbon monoxide react in concentrated sulfuric acid to form glycolic acid, revealing glycolic acid can persist in concentrated sulfuric acid and form higher-molecular-weight colored and fluorescent organics. In 2026, Špaček and colleagues published a model constraining the optical properties of Venus's unidentified UV-blue cloud absorber. Under their aerosol distribution model, the bulk cloud liquid must have a peak decadic absorption coefficient of 1,278 cm⁻¹ at 375 nm, meaning proposed inorganic absorbers (with low molar absorption coefficients) would need to constitute a large fraction of the aerosols, and in some cases remain insufficiently absorbing even in pure form.

== Space mission involvement ==
Špaček is a team member of the Morning Star Missions (formerly Venus Life Finder), aimed at exploring the atmosphere of Venus. His research contributed to the development of the autofluorescence nephelometer on the first Morning Star Mission.

He is also the inventor and lead developer of the Agnostic Life Finder (ALF) instrument, which received funding through a 2024 NASA Innovative Advanced Concept (NIAC) grant and is currently in development at FfAME.

Špaček advocates for the search for extant life on Mars before we send humans there. To advance this cause Špaček started ALFA Mars, a non-profit organization dedicated to agnostic life detection, public outreach, and student training in astrobiology.

Špaček is the lead author of the 2026 Astrobiology paper introducing the International Mars Prospecting Ride-Share System (IMPRESS), a mission architecture which leverages networks of kinetic planetary penetrators for distributed measurements of the Martian surface and shallow subsurface. The concept intends to survey for extant life, prospect for the resources necessary for crewed landing sites, search for signs of past life, and support geophysics and geochemistry experiments.

=== Science communication ===
Špaček has contributed to the science blog Primordial Scoop since 2021, advocating for critical thinking in astrobiology. He has delivered numerous public talks, appeared on podcasts, and been featured in various media outlets.
