= Katerina Janouch =

Swedish journalist (born 1964)

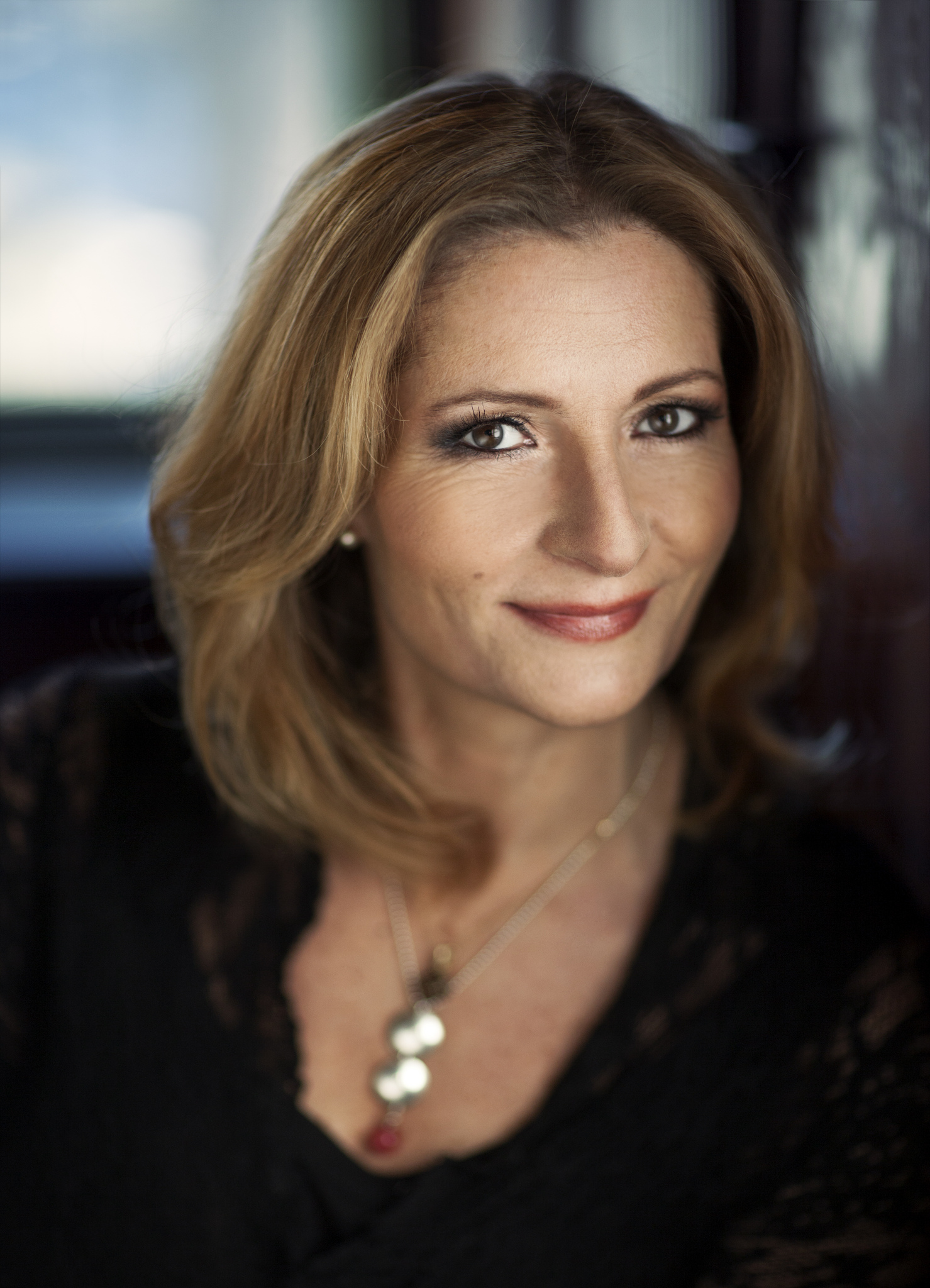
- Janouch in 2012
- Born: Kateřina Janouchová; 22 February 1964 (age 62); Prague, Czechoslovakia
- Occupations: Author; journalist; lecturer; columnist; sexologist

Katerina Janouch (born Kateřina Janouchová; 22 February 1964) is a Swedish author, journalist and sexologist of Czech origin. She is primarily known for her children's books, but has also written about relationships, abuse, female genital mutilation and the political unrest of Sweden.

== Childhood ==
Janouch was born in 1964 in Prague, then Czechoslovakia, and is the daughter of the nuclear scientist František Janouch and Ada Kolman, a professor of radiation biology. Her father, who supported Andrei Sakharov who won the Nobel Peace Prize in 1972-73 and opposed against the Communist regime, was excluded from the Communist Party and was then asked to emigrate.

After a short period in Denmark in 1973, the family moved to Viggbyholm in the Stockholm suburb of Täby in 1974. Her father got to work at the Royal Institute of Technology and founded Charter 77. Janouch quickly learned Swedish, partly because she translated her father's political articles.

== Studies and journalism ==
During high school, Janouch liked to provoke about sex.

It was a good way to get attention. I liked to test the boundaries of what was okay to talk about and I understood that others did not think it was particularly feminine to question and be outspoken.

— Katerina Janouch,

It was also during high school that Janouch decided to become a journalist, of which she had a "romantic image". After university studies in art science and literature (she did not get into the journalist education she wanted), she became a translator at a book publisher, and got to work as a proofreader at Expressen.

She joined and started Swedish Elle in 1988. In the early 1990s, she met her future husband, Robert Bohman. At that moment she already had a child from a previous relationship. Between 1989 and 2002, she had five children.

== Sex and Relationship Advisor ==
In 1992, she was contacted by Amelia Adamo for writing about relations for Veckorevyn, the largest youth magazine at that time. Janouch had followed a course in sexology at Uppsala University, but she is not a sexologist, psychologist or therapist, which she believes is a strength. "I have never considered myself to be an expert, however, I have interviewed many experts." She got her own column in the newspaper, and it was in the role of sex advisor that she became known to a wider audience. This was partly because she was one of the first to write openly about sex.

== Authorship ==
Apart from her journalistic activities, Janouch has also written novels and non-fiction books. Her debut came in 1993, with the novel Våta spår (Wet traces). The reason she wanted to write a book was that she wanted to "produce something that has a longer life. A book persists so much longer than a newspaper article." Janouch's non-fiction publications are focused on female sexuality. Janouch also began writing a series of youth books, where the sexual debut is at the center. Her books are published in 17 languages.

== Politics ==
According to Expressen, Expo, and Aktuelltfokus, Janouch has sometimes expressed controversial views on Sweden's "irresponsible migration policy" due to reports of increasing crimes and political correctness. On 9 January 2017, on Czech TV, she said, among other things, that "Sweden is being destroyed by mass immigration". In response, Sweden's prime minister Stefan Löfven stated that Janouch's interview "was very strange".

In March 2017, Janouch began as a columnist at the far right Sweden Democrats-affiliated political newspaper Nyheter Idag She wrote: "Because I'm allergic to all kinds of extremism, both right and left, I want to write on a fresh independent platform". In 2018, Expressen published an article by Anette Holmqvist, who interviewed Janouch, saying she sought to enter the Swedish parliament.

In April 2018, Janouch announced that she would run in the parliamentary elections for the right-wing extremist Citizens' Coalition party. She stated her main subjects would be "Women's security and the Swedish freedom of speech". She said she believes that for a long time there has been "a very narrow corridor of opinions" meaning that people who have had a different opinion than the prevailing on immigration issues have been labeled as racists. In December 2018 Voice of Europe published an article about Janouch's participation in the protest against the Social Democrats signing the Global Compact contract and she said "do not mess with the sons and daughters of the Vikings". On 2 December 2018 Ingrid Carlqvist and Maria Celander published an article of Janouch protesting Global compact. During a debate hosted by the far right media platform Swebbtv, Katerina Janouch was invited to comment on the "low intense war being committed in Sweden". In an article by WJLA published in March 2018 about the increase of sex crimes and violence against women, Katerina Janouch was quoted saying "Sweden has changed very much. It has never been like this."

Since 2018, Janouch has become active in right wing movements with closer ties to white supremacy and conspiracy theories, such as the network Education4Future where she was a founding member. The Citizens' Coalition party, for which Janouch had been a parliamentary candidate in the 2018 elections, chose to distance themselves from her in December the same year due to "a radicalization in her way of expressing herself", according to the chairman of the party. Janouch promotes anti-vaccination propaganda.

== Filmography ==
=== Film ===
Year	Title	Role	Notes
2004	Kärlekens språk	Sexologist	

== Bibliography ==
- Budbärarinnan
- Bilden av Sverige : en personlig resa
- Bilden av verkligheten
- Vapendragerskan
- Till mitt älskade barn : från din mamma
- Så känns det : en bok om känslor
- Svenska kvinnors hemliga sexuella äventyr
- Babyrace. På smällen
- Så bråkar man och så blir man sams
- Vad är sex och 100 andra jätteviktiga frågor
- Orgasmboken
- 69 sexiga lekar
- Skugghäxan
- Nattsländan
- Blodssystrar
- Barfotaflickan
- Babyrace
- Svenska kvinnors hemliga sexuella fantasier
- Bedragen
