= Bakov nad Jizerou =

- Town
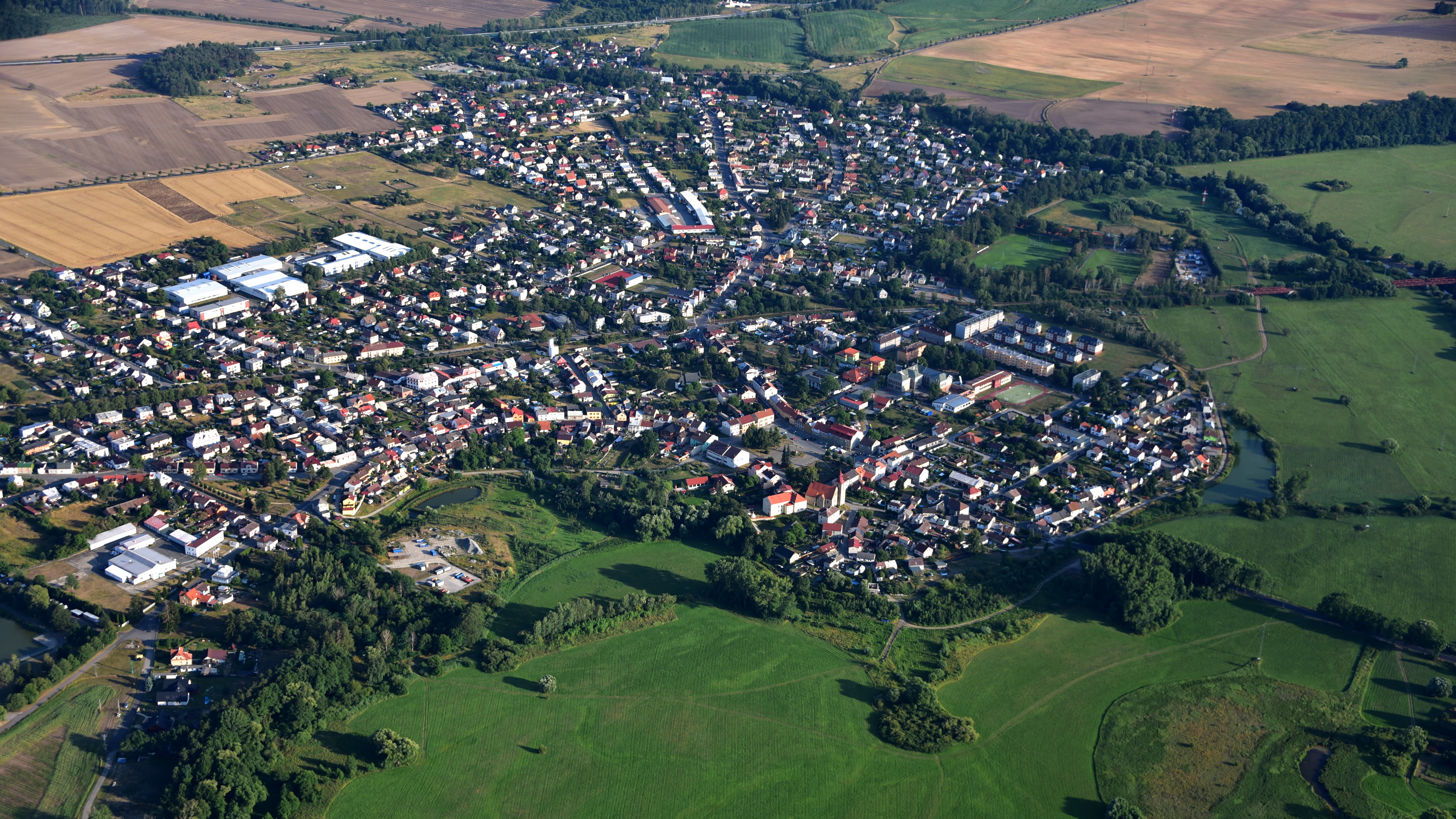
- Aerial view

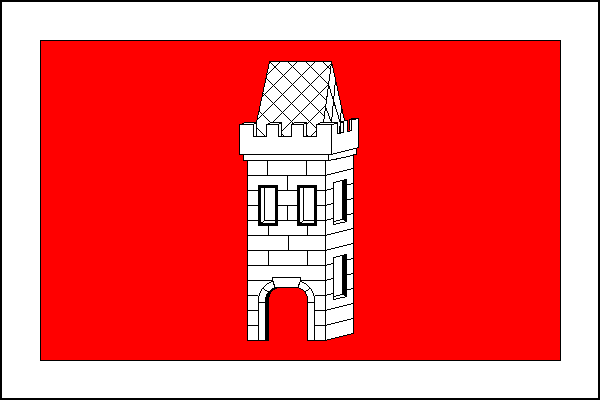
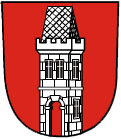
- Flag Coat of arms

- Location in the Czech Republic
- Coordinates: 50°28′57″N 14°56′30″E
- Country: Czech Republic
- Region: Central Bohemian
- District: Mladá Boleslav
- First mentioned: 1345

Government
  - Mayor: Jana Blechová

Area
  - Total: 27.01 km^{2} (10.43 sq mi)
- Elevation: 220 m (720 ft)

Population (2026-01-01)
  - Total: 5,355
  - Density: 198.3/km^{2} (513.5/sq mi)
- Time zone: UTC+1 (CET)
  - Summer (DST): UTC+2 (CEST)
- Postal code: 294 01
- Website: www.bakovnj.cz

Bakov nad Jizerou (Czech pronunciation: [ˈbakof ˈnad jɪzɛrou]; German: Backofen (an der Iser)) is a town in Mladá Boleslav District in the Central Bohemian Region of the Czech Republic. It has about 5,400 inhabitants. It is located on the Jizera River.

== Administrative division ==
Bakov nad Jizerou consists of 13 municipal parts (in brackets population according to the 2021 census):

- Bakov nad Jizerou (3,554)
- Brejlov (2)
- Buda (162)
- Chudoplesy (333)
- Horka (82)
- Klokočka (5)
- Malá Bělá (633)
- Malý Rečkov (21)
- Podhradí (76)
- Studénka (1)
- Velký Rečkov (16)
- Zájezdy (0)
- Zvířetice (91)

== Etymology ==
The name Bakov is derived from the name of its probable founder, a man named Bak.

== Geography ==
Bakov nad Jizerou is located about 6 km (4 mi) north of Mladá Boleslav and 50 km (31 mi) northeast of Prague. Most of the municipal territory lies in the Jičín Uplands, but it also extends to the Jizera Table on the west. The highest point is a contour line on the slopes of the Baba hill at 329 m (1,079 ft) above sea level. The town proper is situated on the left bank of the Jizera River, at its confluence with the Kněžmostka Stream.

== History ==
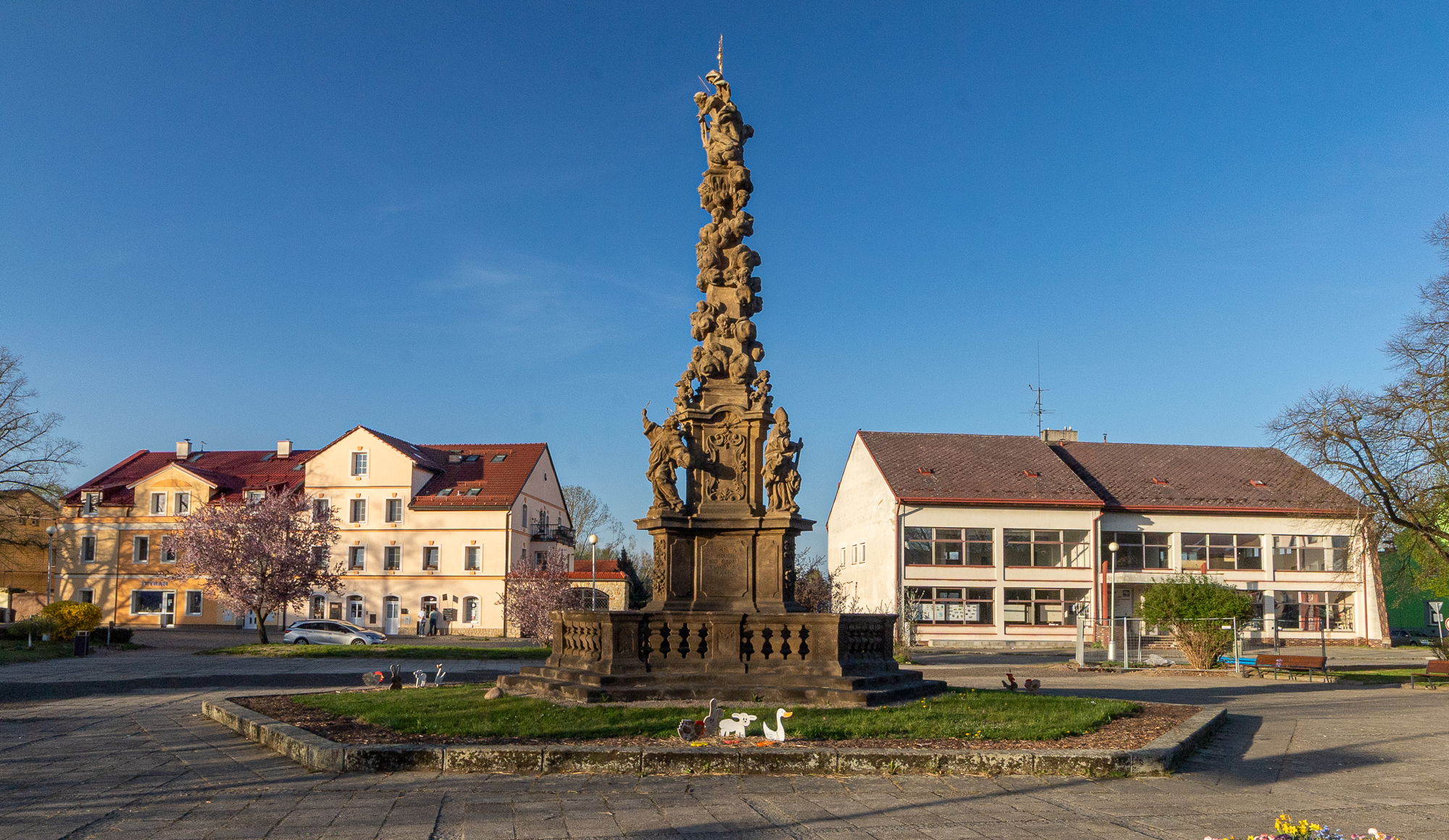
Town square with the Marian column

Bakov nad Jizerou was probably founded during the colonisation of Bohemia at the turn of the 12th and 13th centuries. The first written mention of Bakov is from 1345, when it was bought from the Hradiště Monastery by Markvart of Zvířetice. He made it the centre of the Zvířetice estate. The village survived the Hussite Wars unscathed and continued to develop. In 1497, Bakov was promoted to a town.

In 1643, during the Thirty Years' War, Bakov was burned down by the Swedish army. During the second half of the 17th century, the town gradually recovered. Bakov also regularly suffered from floods, so in 1753 the bed of the Jizera was diverted further away from the town.

Bakov was traditionally an agricultural settlement. From the 16th to the 18th century, pottery was an important source of livelihood for the inhabitants. From the end of the 17th century, knitting from bulrush was a characteristic craft for the town.

== Demographics ==
Historical population

Year	Pop.	±%
1869	3,233	—
1880	3,611	+11.7%
1890	3,845	+6.5%
1900	4,065	+5.7%
1910	4,719	+16.1%

Year	Pop.	±%
1921	4,745	+0.6%
1930	5,603	+18.1%
1950	4,733	−15.5%
1961	5,020	+6.1%
1970	4,792	−4.5%

Year	Pop.	±%
1980	4,601	−4.0%
1991	4,369	−5.0%
2001	4,544	+4.0%
2011	4,978	+9.6%
2021	4,976	−0.0%

Source: Censuses

== Transport ==
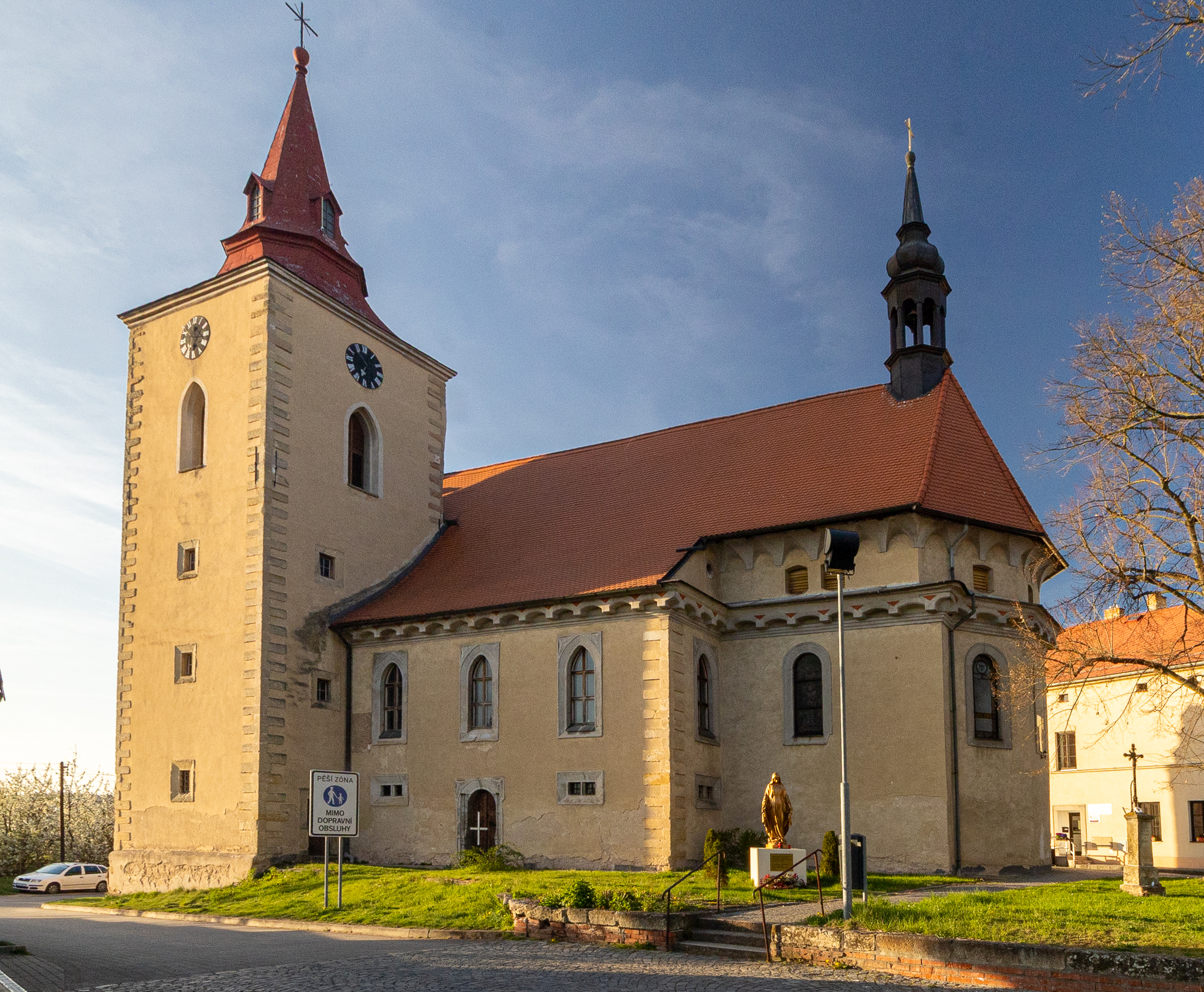
Church of Saint Bartholomew

The D10 motorway from Prague to Turnov runs next to the town.

Bakov nad Jizerou is located the railway lines Prague–Tanvald and Nymburk–Turnov.

== Sights ==
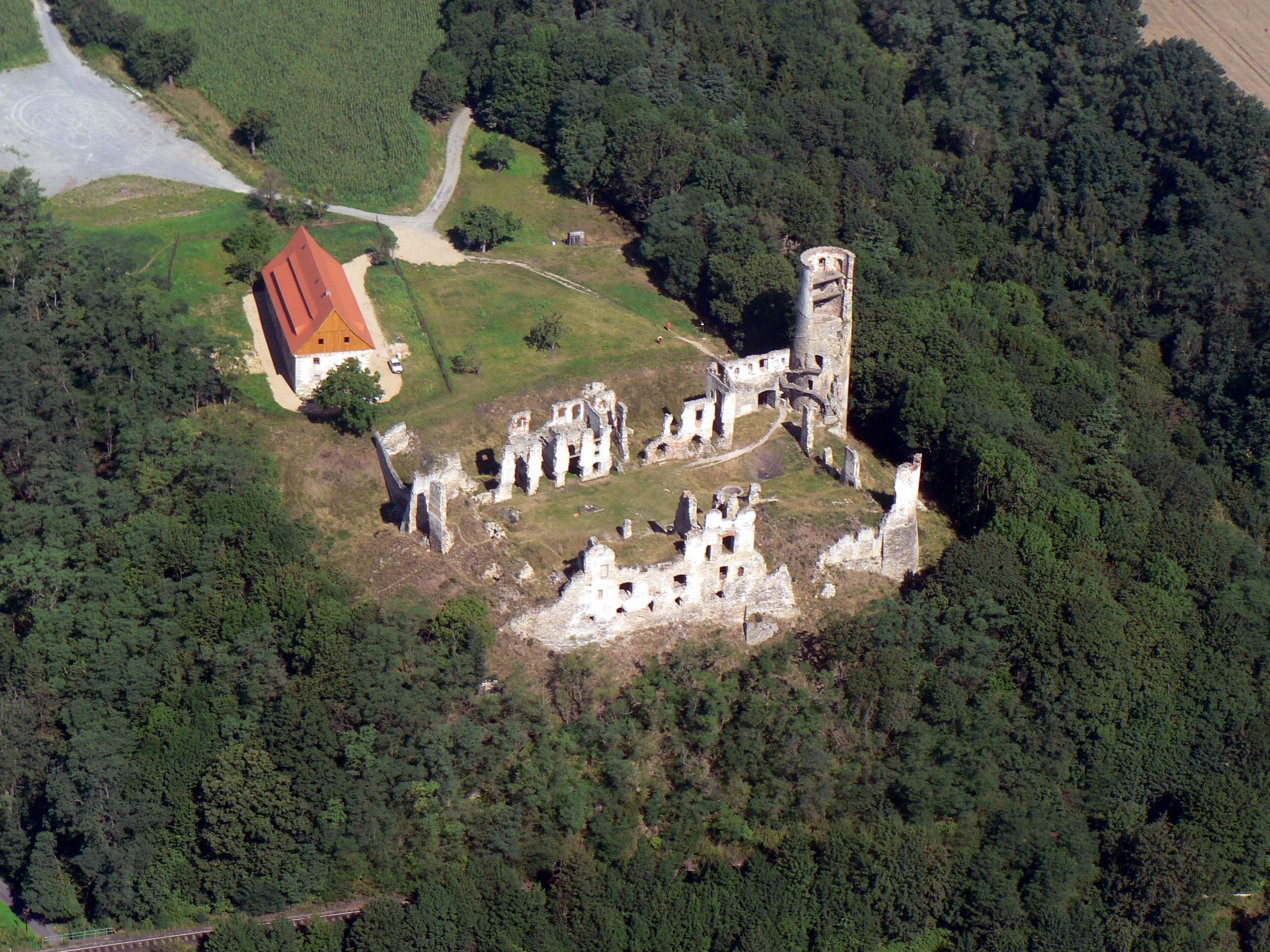
Ruins of the Zvířetice Castle

The main landmark of the town centre is the Church of Saint Bartholomew. A wooden chapel, which was as old as Bakov, was rebuilt into a stone Gothic church in 1384. After the fire in 1643, it was completely rebuilt in the second half of the 17th century, and was equipped with new bells.

The Holy Trinity Column in the middle of the town square was built in 1727–1729.

The most important monument is the ruin of the Zvířetice Castle. Originally, it was a Gothic castle built before 1287. At the end of the 16th century, it was rebuilt into a Renaissance residence. In 1693, it was damaged by fire and partly reconstructed. After the second fire in 1720, it became a ruin. Today, the ruin is a tourist destination and offers guided tours.

== Notable people ==
- Jiří Ignác Linek (1725–1791), composer
- Karel Chodounský (1843–1931), medical doctor and pharmacologist
