= Masaryk University =

Public university in Brno, Czech Republic

- Masarykova univerzita
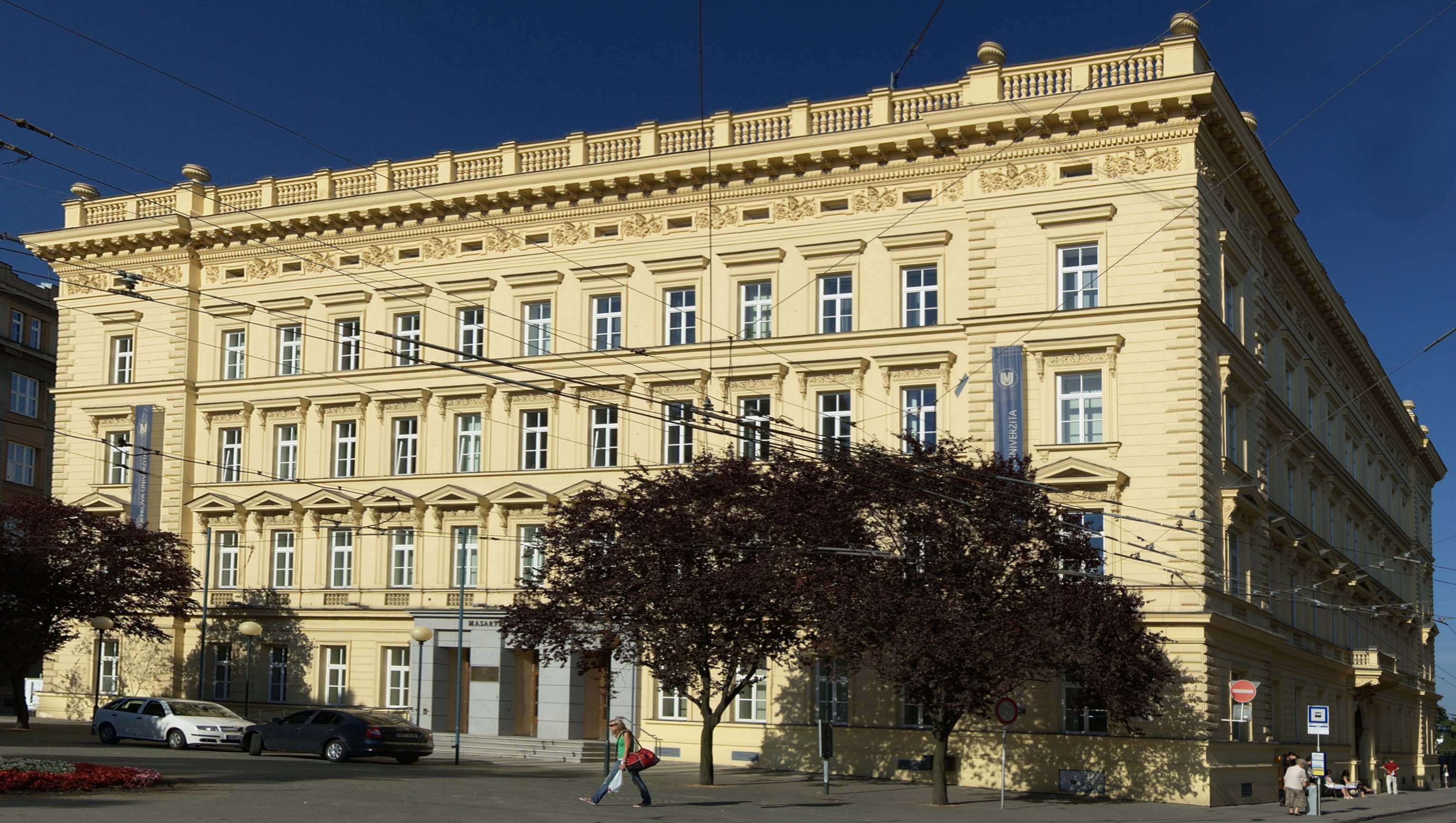
- Latin: Universitas Masarykiana Brunensis
- Type: Public
- Established: 1919
- Affiliations: EUA; Compostela Group; Utrecht Network
- Rector: Prof. Martin Bareš
- Faculty: 2,200
- Administrative staff: 3,000
- Students: 35,115
- Location: Brno, Czech Republic; 49°11′55″N 16°36′18″E
- Campus: Urban
- Colors: Blue
- Website: muni.cz
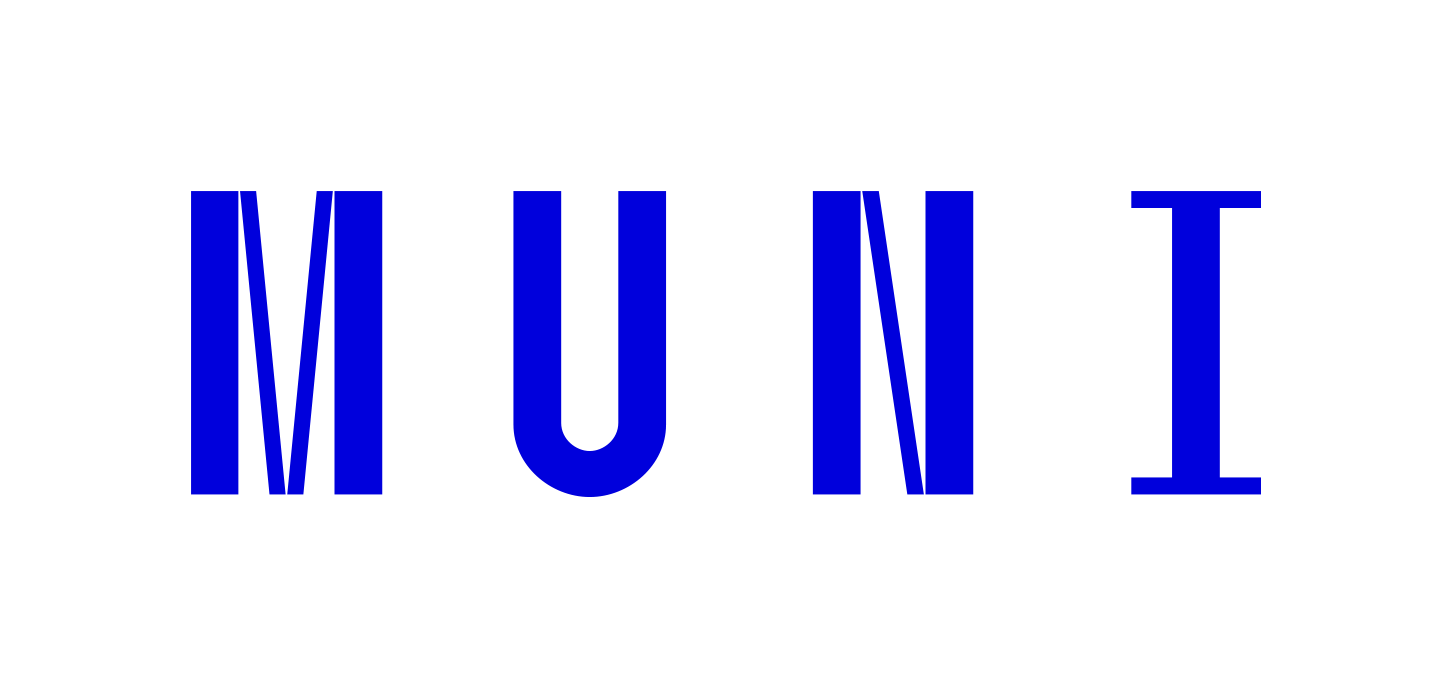

Masaryk University (MU) (Czech: Masarykova univerzita; Latin: Universitas Masarykiana Brunensis) is the second largest university in the Czech Republic, a member of the Compostela Group and the Utrecht Network. Founded in 1919 in Brno, it now consists of ten faculties and 35,115 students. It is named after Tomáš Garrigue Masaryk, the first president of an independent Czechoslovakia as well as the leader of the movement for a second Czech university.

In 1960 the university was renamed Jan Evangelista Purkyně University after Jan Evangelista Purkyně, a Czech biologist. In 1990, following the Velvet Revolution it regained its original name. Since 1922, over 171,000 students have graduated from the university.

== History ==
Masaryk University was founded on 28 January 1919 with four faculties: Law, Medicine, Science, and Arts. Tomáš Garrigue Masaryk, professor of Charles University and later the first president of Czechoslovakia, contributed greatly to the establishment of Masaryk University. (Masaryk in his scientific and political activities paid attention to the development of Czechoslovak universities and since the 1880s he emphasized the need for broad competition in scientific work. In this context, he pointed out that the only Czech university at that time needed a competitive institution for its development.) The founding of the second Czech university was possible only after the fall of the Austro-Hungarian monarchy because of the resistance of the German-controlled city council, which feared giving power to the Czech residents of Brno. Brno was at that time a bilingual city. A notable demonstration in favour of establishing a university in Brno happened in 1905.

From the beginning, the university suffered from a lack of money for development. The fragile state of public finances in 1923–1925 and 1933–1934 led to proposals to abolish both the Faculty of Arts and the Faculty of Science. Both faculties eventually survived until 17 November 1939 when the whole university was closed following the German occupation of Czechoslovakia. A number of professors of Masaryk University were executed or tortured; for example, the Faculty of Science lost one quarter of its teaching staff. Many of the executions took place in the Mauthausen concentration camp in 1942.

Faculty	Year founded
Faculty of Medicine	1919
Faculty of Law	1919
Faculty of Science	1919
Faculty of Arts	1919
Faculty of Education	1946
Pharmaceutical Faculty	1952*
Faculty of Economics and Administration	1991
Faculty of Informatics	1994
Faculty of Social Studies	1998
Faculty of Sports Studies	2002
* Pharmaceutical Faculty was closed down in 1960 and then later renewed in 2020

The renewal of university life after the end of World War II was interrupted by the Communist takeover. The percentage of students expelled in various faculties ranged from 5 percent at the Faculty of Education to 46 percent at the Faculty of Law, which was completely closed in 1950. In 1953, the Faculty of Education (founded in 1946) was separated from the university. In August 1960, a government decree abolished the Pharmaceutical Faculty and the university was renamed Jan Evangelista Purkyně University in Brno.

Relaxation occurred in 1964 with the reintegration of the Faculty of Education into the university and with the reestablishment of the Faculty of Law in 1969. But conditions changed again rapidly with the Normalization of the 1970s after the 1968 invasion of Warsaw Pact troops into Czechoslovakia.

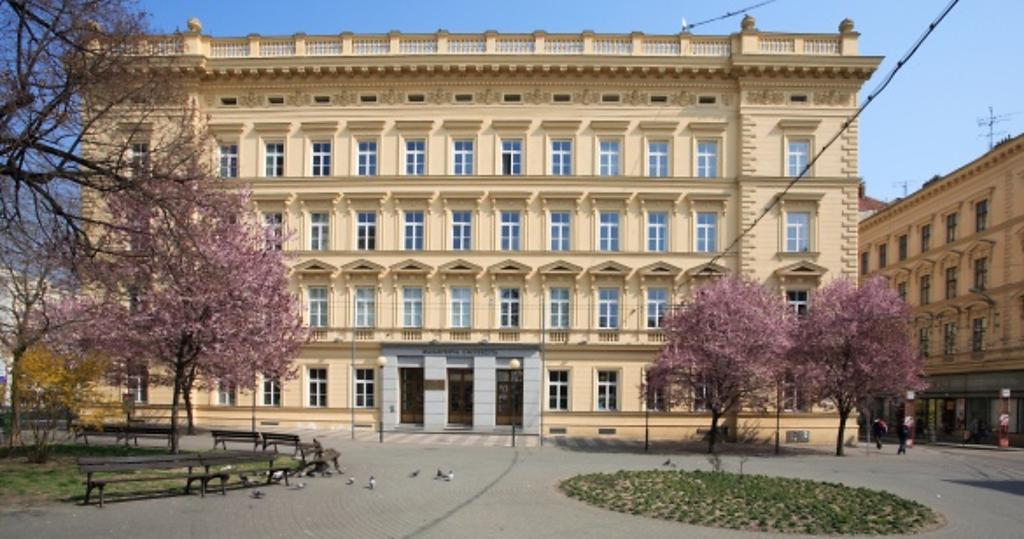
Masaryk University rector's office on Žerotínovo náměstí in Brno

The university was renamed Masaryk University in Brno in 1990, then regaining its original name by dropping the "in Brno" from the title in 2006. A new era of development began after the Velvet Revolution of 1989 and the establishment of the Faculty of Economics and Administration in 1991, the Faculty of Informatics in 1994, the Faculty of Social Studies in 1998, and the Faculty of Sports Studies in 2002.

A new university campus has been under construction in Brno-Bohunice since 2002. The last stage of development should be completed in 2015. Campus houses most Faculty of Medicine, Faculty of Sports Studies, part of Faculty of Sciences as well as several research facilities such as Central European Institute of Technology and Research Centre for Toxic Compounds in the Environment Cetocoen.

In 2013, university signed a long-term lease with the city of Brno, creating University Cinema Scala in place of movie theatre with over 80 years tradition which was closed down in 2011. The place has various academic functions, hosting official university ceremonies as well as lectures and conferences. Cinema's programming is managed by Aeropolis, which shares the costs with the university.

== Faculties ==
Masaryk University comprises ten faculties. Established in 1919 are the Faculty of Law (PrF), Faculty of Medicine (LF), Faculty of Science (PřF), and Faculty of Arts (FF). The Faculty of Education (PdF) was added in 1946, the Faculty of Pharmacy (FaF) in 1952 (closed in 1960 and reopened in 2020). The Faculty of Economics and Administration (ESF) was founded in 1990, the Faculty of Informatics (FI) in 1994, the Faculty of Social Studies (FSS) in 1998, and the Faculty of Sports Studies (FSpS) in 2002.

The Faculty of Law closed in 1950 and reopened in 1969. The Faculty of Education became an independent school in 1953 and rejoined the university in 1964. The Faculty of Pharmacy operated briefly from 1952 to 1960, then re-established in 1991 under a different university, and reintegrated into Masaryk University in 2020. From 1990 to 1991, two faculties in Silesia (Faculty of Arts in Opava and Faculty of Business and Entrepreneurship in Karviná) were part of Masaryk University before forming the Silesian University in 1991.

Faculty of Law The Faculty of Law, established in 1919, is one of the oldest faculties at Masaryk University. Temporarily closed during the communist regime, it was reopened in 1969. The faculty is housed in a building originally intended for the university's campus on Veveří Street. It offers a five-year master's program in Law and various bachelor's and doctoral programs in public administration and business, with 11 specializations in Czech and four in English.

Faculty of Medicine The Faculty of Medicine, also founded in 1919, moved to the Brno-Bohunice campus in 2010. It collaborates with several local hospitals, including the University Hospital Brno. The faculty offers a six-year General Medicine program, a five-year Dentistry program, and various bachelor's degrees in fields like nursing, midwifery, and paramedic studies. Doctoral studies (Ph.D.) are also available.

Faculty of Science The Faculty of Science began its activities gradually after the university's founding in 1919, with facilities on Kounicova, Veveří, and Kotlářská Streets. It later expanded to the Brno-Bohunice campus. The faculty offers a wide range of programs in biology, chemistry, physics, mathematics, geography, anthropology, and geology at the bachelor's, master's, and doctoral levels.

Faculty of Arts The Faculty of Arts, the fourth oldest at the university, is the largest Czech faculty. It is primarily located on Arne Nováka Street. The faculty offers numerous programs in languages, literature, history, philosophy, psychology, and the arts at the bachelor's, master's, and doctoral levels, through its various departments and institutes.

Faculty of Education Founded in 1946, the Faculty of Education was temporarily replaced by a higher pedagogical school and an institute in the 1950s. It rejoined the university in 1964 and is located on Poříčí Street. The faculty offers bachelor's, master's, and doctoral programs in humanities, sciences, and arts, covering languages, history, psychology, pedagogy, biology, physics, chemistry, geography, mathematics, music, and art education.

Faculty of Pharmacy The Faculty of Pharmacy originally existed from 1952 to 1960 and was reestablished in 2020. It was housed in the Veterinary University campus and focuses on pharmacy education through six departments. At present, it has been located in the Brno-Bohunice campus since September 2026.

Faculty of Economics and Administration Established in 1990, the Faculty of Economics and Administration is one of the younger faculties, located on Lipová Street in Brno-Pisárky. It offers programs in economics, financial business, management, public administration, and regional development at the bachelor's, master's, and doctoral levels.

Faculty of Informatics Founded in 1994, the Faculty of Informatics was created by separating the informatics department from the Faculty of Science. It is situated on Botanická Street and offers bachelor's, master's, and doctoral programs in Informatics and Applied Informatics.

Faculty of Social Studies The Faculty of Social Studies became independent from the Faculty of Arts in 1998, focusing on sociology, psychology, and political science. It is located on Joštova Street and offers programs in media studies, environmental studies, social policy, and international relations at all academic levels.

Faculty of Sports Studies The youngest faculty, established in 2002, the Faculty of Sports Studies is located in the Brno-Bohunice campus. It has departments for athletics, swimming, outdoor sports, gymnastics, kinesiology, sports pedagogy, health promotion, social sciences, sports management, and sports games. It offers bachelor's, master's, and doctoral programs and has a university sports center at Pod Hradem Gym.

== Academics ==
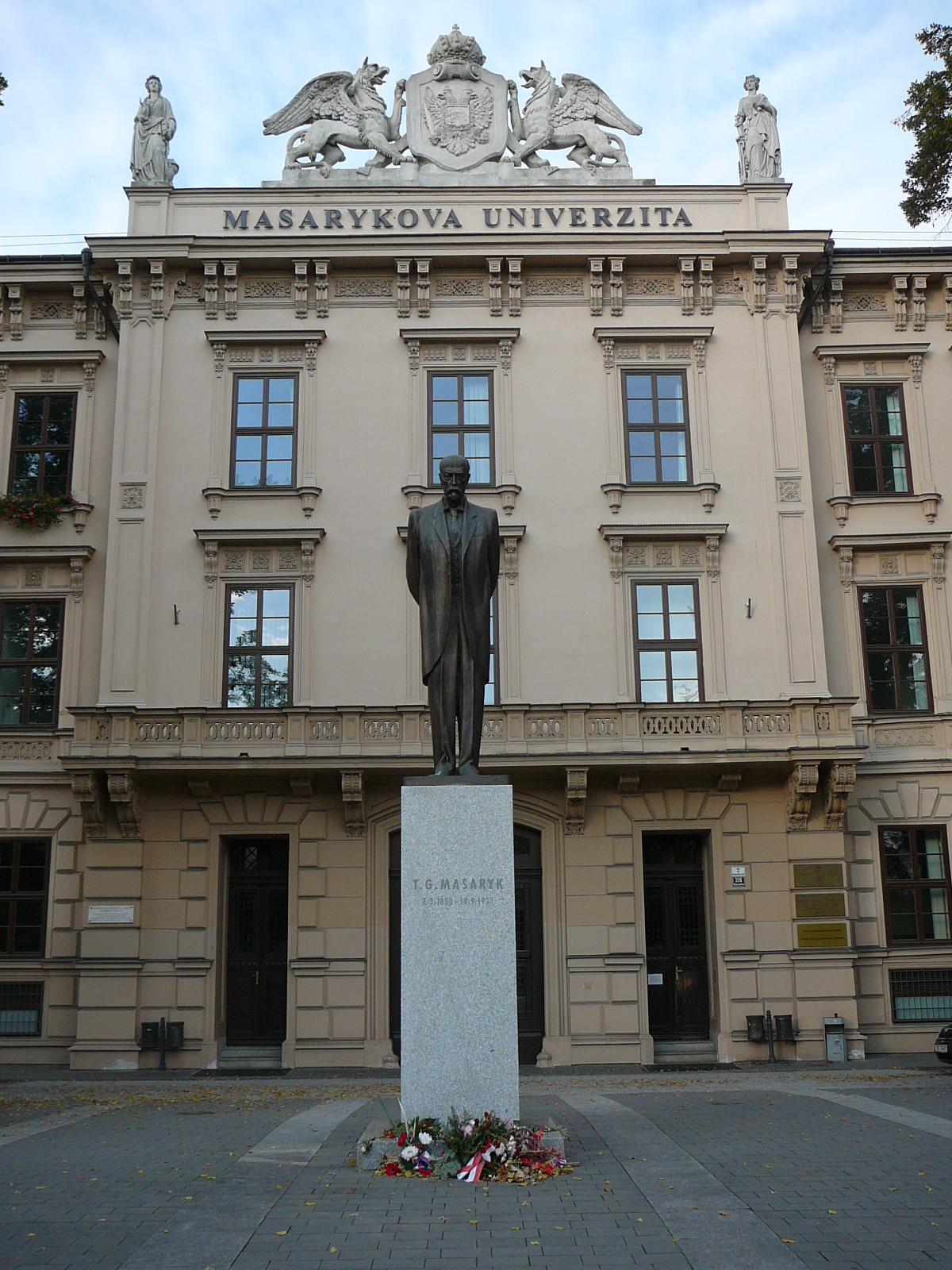
MUNI Computer Centre and ESN MUNI office

=== Education ===
As of 2014, Masaryk University has over 35,000 students and over 2,200 pedagogical staff and offers over 200 bachelor, 290 masters and 130 doctoral full-time study programs, some of them being offered in English or German as well as in combined form.

The Office of International Studies helps facilitate incoming and outgoing student mobility. In the 2012/13 academic year the university hosted over 1,000 international students. Students with special needs are assisted by the Teiresiás centre.

The university opened the Mendel Museum in 2007, creating an exhibition ground dedicated to the popularization of the scientific work and life of Gregor Johann Mendel who conducted his experiments in the Augustinian abbey where the museum is now located. The Mendel Lectures given by the world's top scientists in genetics, molecular biology, biochemistry, microbiology and medicine have been held in the Mendel Museum.

The University Cinema Scala has been operated by the Masaryk University since October 2013 as the first university cinema in the Czech Republic. The Freedom Lecture, a public debate on a current social topic with outstanding personalities has been held annually at the cinema on the occasion of International Students' Day (Student Seventeen) since 2014.

=== Research ===
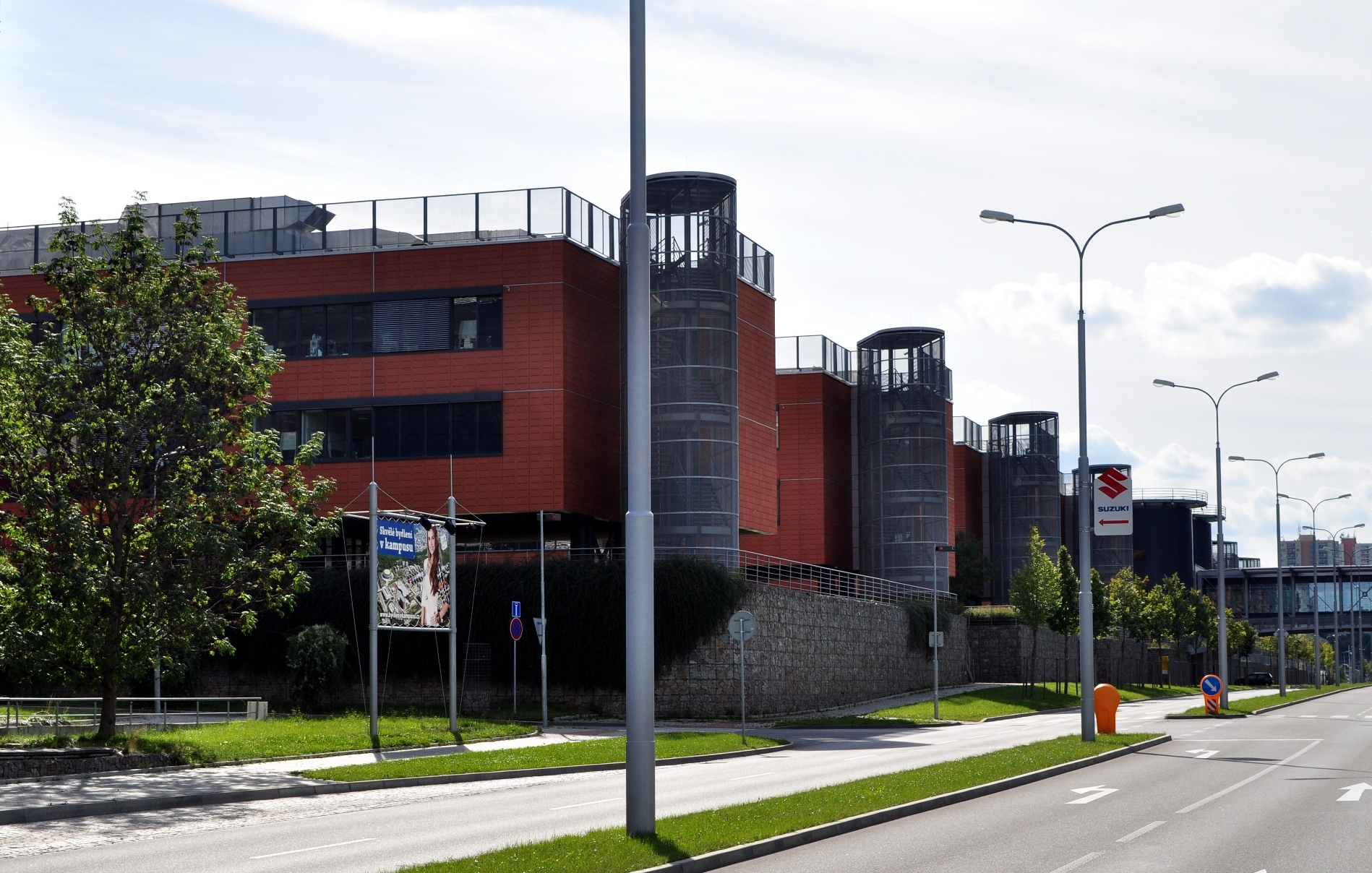
A building in campus VI

Masaryk University together with other institutions of higher education participate in CEITEC – a research centre for both basic and applied research in the field of life sciences.

The university owns and operates Mendel Polar Station in Antarctica. The station facilitates basic biological, geological and climatological research. The station was built in 2005 and 2006 and is staffed during Antarctic summers.

The Technology Transfer Office of Masaryk University was established in 2005 and aims to put research results into practice and support and facilitate cooperation between the scientific community and industry.

=== Grant Agency of Masaryk University ===
Grant Agency of Masaryk University (GAMU) is an internal organizations of Masaryk University providing students, internal and external researchers and research teams with funding in all phases of their research career via the following grant schemes:

- HORIZONS - Support for Preparation of International Grant Projects
- INTERDISCIPLINARY Research Projects
- MASH - MUNI Award in Science and Humanities
- MASH JUNIOR - MUNI Award in Science and Humanities JUNIOR
- CAREER RESTART - Support for Integration of Researchers After a Career Break
- MUNI SCIENTIST - Award for Outstanding Research Results

=== Rankings ===
University rankings

Global – Overall
- QS World: =430 (2026)
- THE World: 501–600

Regional – Overall
- QS Emerging Europe and Central Asia: 7 (2022)

The university is a highly research-intensive institution. It puts "a great deal of emphasis on international cooperation with prestigious foreign universities and [other] research institutions". The university has maintained its position within the world best 600 universities for years 2016–2018. Amongst all universities in the EU-countries joined the EU since 2004, Masaryk University was ranked at 7. According to a recent ranking by QS Students City, the Masaryk university shares fifth place worldwide with Berlin, Vienna, Stockholm and Amsterdam before New York, London and Sydney but behind Prague in the category "student's view".

== Notable alumni ==
Masaryk University has over 170,000 alumni, some of the notable ones are listed here. The most accomplished scientists include astronomer Jiří Grygar and Luboš Kohoutek, mathematician Otakar Borůvka and František Wolf, psychiatrist Leo Eitinger, sociologist Miloslav Petrusek, paediatric geneticist Renata Laxova and anthropologist Jaroslav Malina. Paleontologist Josef Augusta, who together with illustrator Zdeněk Burian created accurate reconstructions representing all forms of prehistoric life. Neurologist Michal Vytopil also attended the university.

Alumni politicians include former Prime Ministers of the Czech Republic Petr Nečas and Petr Fiala, former Governor of South Moravian Region Michal Hašek, former Minister of Health Tomáš Julínek or as of 2014, the leader of Czech Green Party Ondřej Liška. Politician, dissident, human rights activist Jaroslav Šabata also studied there. Martin Palouš is Permanent Representative to the United Nations of the Czech republic (2006– ), before he was Ambassador to the United States for the Czech Republic between 2001 and 2005.

Alumni also include director František Vláčil, playwright Milan Uhde, composer Antonín Tučapský and poets Jan Skácel and Ivan Blatný.

Professional graduated

Alumni athletes include the rock climber Adam Ondra, considered the greatest climber of the modern era, as well as Šárka Kašpárková and ice hockey players Jiří Holík and Josef Augusta.

== Controversies ==
The Prime Minister of the Czech Republic Petr Fiala has been working part-time at Masaryk University for the entire duration of his mandate. He should therefore devote eight hours a week – thirty-two hours a month – to work for this university. Jan Fischer responded to this as follows: "I also cannot imagine that someone, in addition to his work as Prime Minister, regularly, not just on special occasions, lectures at a university. Learning requires preparation and concentration."

== Notable faculty ==
- Antonín Bartoněk (1926–2016) – linguist (ancient Greek)
- Otakar Bittmann (1891–1945) – gynaecologist-obstetrician, resistance member, racing driver
- Karel Chodounský (1843–1931) – pharmacologist and alpinist
- Eduard Čech (1893–1960) – mathematician
- Felix Maria Davídek (1921–1988) – Secret bishop (underground catholic church)
- Petr Horálek (1986) – Astronomer, Astrophotographer, Artist
- Roman Jakobson (1896–1982) – linguist and literary theorist
- Jaroslav Krejčí (1892–1956) – lawyer and Prime Minister of Protectorate of Bohemia and Moravia
- Albert Kutal (1904–1976) – Art historian
- Matyáš Lerch (1860–1922) – mathematician
- Zdeněk Měřínský (1948–2015) – archeologist
- Emanuela Nohejlová-Prátová (1900–1995) – numismatist and museum curator
- Arne Novák (1880–1939) – literary historian
- Bohuslav Sobotka (1971) – Lawyer, Prime Minister
- Tomáš Špidlík (1919–2010) – cardinal, theologian-important thinker in 20th Catholicism, personal spiritual director of Pope John Paul II.
- Ladislav Skula (1937) – mathematician
- František Vláčil (1924–1999) – Film director
- Petr Fiala (1964) – former Prime Minister of the Czech Republic

== See also ==
- List of modern universities in Europe (1801–1945)
- List of Czech universities
- Jan Špaček
