= Vecko-Journalen =

Swedish weekly magazine (1910–1963)

- Former editors: Börge Bengtsson
- Frequency: Weekly
- Publisher: Åhlén & Åkerlunds
- Founder: Erik Åkerlund
- Founded: 1910
- Final issue: 1963
- Country: Sweden
- Based in: Stockholm
- Language: Swedish

Vecko-Journalen (Swedish: Weekly Record) was a weekly magazine published under various titles from 1910 to 2002.

== History and profile ==
Vecko-Journalen was founded by Erik Åkerlund in 1910. The same year he also established the publishing company Åhlén & Åkerlunds. The company was acquired by the Bonnier Group in 1929. The magazine was based in Stockholm and was published on a weekly basis. Among many others, Börge Bengtsson served as the editor-in-chief of the magazine.

Vecko-Journalen frequently featured life of Carl Emil Pettersson, a Swedish adventurer, in the 1930s. It was one of the Swedish publications which contained news materials provided by the Swedish Intelligence Agency during World War II.

It was published weekly from 1910 to 1963 when it merged with the magazine Idun and took the double-barrelled name Idun-Veckojournalen. The merged magazine continued to be published weekly until 1980, when falling circulation figures forced it to a monthly cycle, and it was renamed Månadsjournalen (Swedish: Monthly Record). It ceased publication in 2002.
