= University Cinema Scala =

Cinema in Brno, Czech Republic

Coordinates: 49.1974°N 16.6082°E

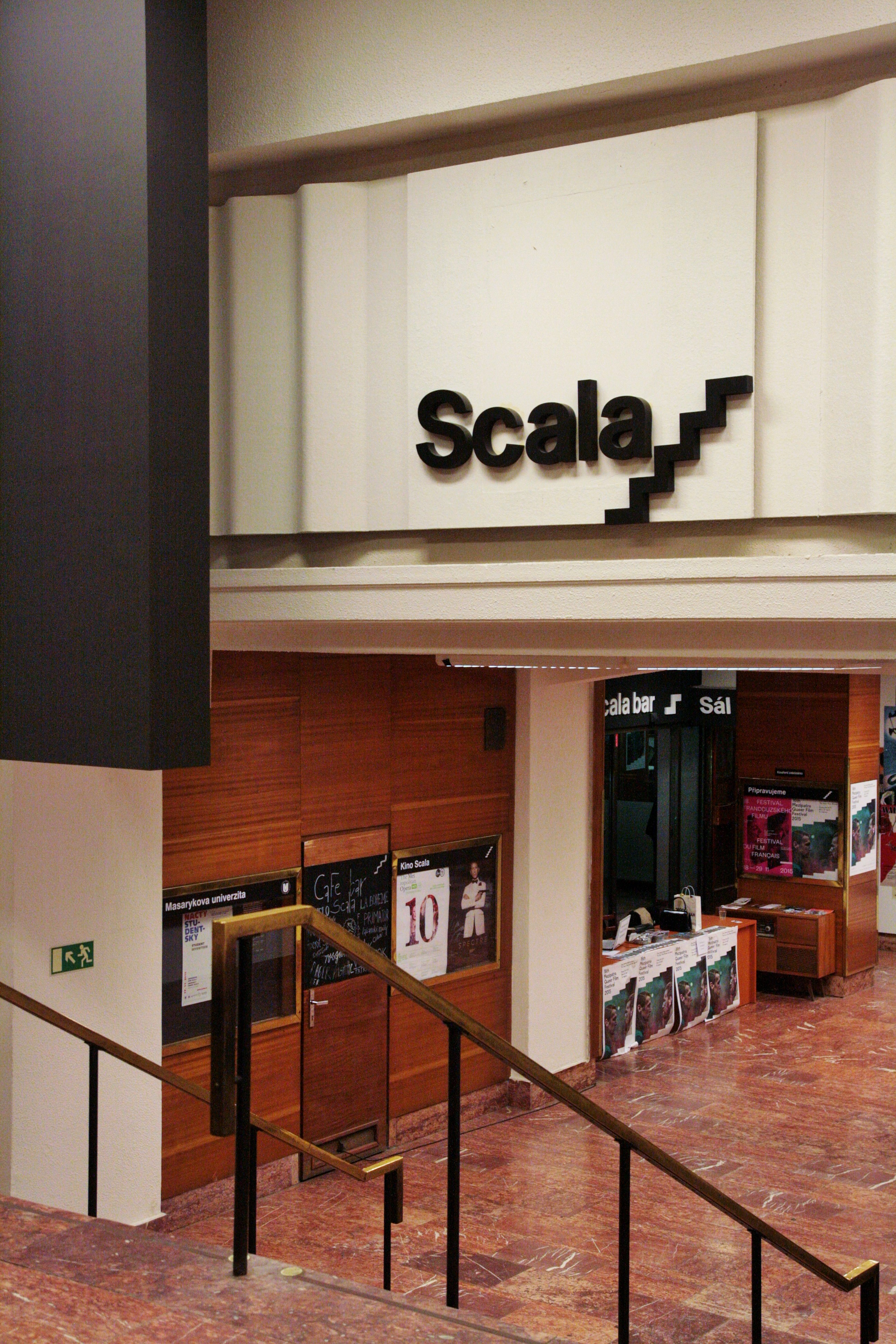
University Cinema Scala's logo above the cinema entrance staircase

University Cinema Scala is a cinema in Brno in the Czech Republic. It is located at Moravské náměstí (Moravian Square) in the basement of building 127/3, city quarter Brno-střed and neighbourhood Brno-město. It has been in operation since 1929 and was at times also called Bio Dopz and Kino Moskva (Moscow Cinema). Since the autumn of 2013, it has been run by Masaryk University and the Aeropolis company as the first university cinema in the Czech Republic. Besides regular film screenings, it also serves as a representative space and a lecture and conference hall used for academic purposes.

== History ==
=== Bio Dopz (1929–1935) ===
The first mobile cinematographs appear edin Brno in 1896 and the first permanent cinema opened in 1907. However, the current University Cinema Scala only opened about 20 years later, when there were already a number of other cinemas in the city: Centrál (the first cinema, that opened in 1907), Edison (1908), Varieté (later turned into the Divadlo Radost theatre), Oránia (1911), Lidový biograf (1911), and other ones. Scala opened in a new building called the DOPZ Palace, which was built at Moravské náměstí (then called Lažanského náměstí) probably between 1927 and 1928.

DOPZ was an acronym of the cooperative society "Družstvo obchodních a průmyslových zaměstnanců" (full name "Stavební a obchodní družstvo zaměstnanců obchodu a průmyslu, zapsaná společnost s ručením omezeným") that had owned the whole building since September 1927. Though the cinema was originally called Bio Dopz, it was not run by the cooperative, but by a foundation designed to support university students in Moravia and Silesia named after T. G. Masaryk ("Masarykův fond na podporu studentstva vysokých škol na Moravě a ve Slezsku"). The foundation asked for a licence to operate a cinematograph as early as on 11 July 1922, and on 28 December 1923 it was granted a licence to operate the Bristol cinema in Křenová street valid until the end of 1926. However, the foundation found it difficult to acquire the premises needed to run a cinema and so it kept looking at other places – such as the cinema Universum in Lidická (then called Nová) street or a hall in the new Nový domov building in Gorkého (Folkensteinerova) street – until the licence expired. The foundation was promised a new licence in April 1927 and in June 1928, it was offered by DOPZ to run a cinema in its building (DOPZ Palace) located between two squares – Moravské náměstí and Jakubské náměstí (Jacobian Square). Accordingly, it asked for a new licence on 24 September 1928. After some disputes with the local authorities, the foundation was granted a preliminary licence on 27 December 1929 and a full licence on 6 March 1930. While it was trying to obtain a licence, the premises of the cinema were acquired by the company Kraus a spol. On 20 December 1929, the foundation entered into an agreement with the company valid until the end of 1935. According to the agreement, the company set up and run the cinema using the licence acquired by the foundation; in return, it paid 8% of its gross revenue to the foundation. In its turn, the foundation was paying 40% of its net gains to three different associations.

The cinema opened on 28 December 1929 with a screening of the American sound film romance White Shadows in the South Seas which received an Oscar for best cinematography. At the time, the cinema was managed by Rudolf Valenta, and since 1930 by Rudolf Urban. The entrance fee ranged between 3 and 7 Czechoslovak crowns. While the overall earnings are unknown, the foundation received a yearly share of 189,077, 160,642, and 121,782 crowns in 1930, 1931, and 1932 respectively.

=== Kino Scala (1935–1948) ===
For commercial reasons, the name of the cinema was changed to Scala on 3 December 1935. At that time, the licence was nearing its expiration date. The foundation asked for the licence to be extended in February 1936; the application was refused on 31 March 1936 and the local authorities requested that the cinema should be closed by the end of 1936. In October 1937, the Scala licence was granted to a police headquarters association "Jubilejní ozdravovna policejního ředitelství v Brně". This association received 5.5% of net revenue from the Kraus company, which amounted to 85,075 and 82,832 crowns in 1937 and 1938 respectively, and it was required to transfer 2% to other associations.

In the following years, the operation of the cinema was impacted by the German occupation. Among other things, the contribution to the Masaryk foundation was cancelled and substituted by a contribution to Nationalsozialistische Volkswohlfahrt (NSV). On 4 December 1941, the DOPZ buildings were purchased by the insurance company and on 14 July 1942, the cinema premises were rented by Fritz Lord and Josef Veselý, who began to operate the cinema. They asked for a cinema licence as early as on 2 June 1941 and received it on 7 April 1944. With the arrival of the battlefront on 15 April 1945, the cinema was forced to suspend its operation. The cinema building burned out, as well as the neighbouring buildings, but the basement premises of the cinema were left untouched. After the most necessary repairs of the entrance, the cinema opened for provisional screenings on 9 May 1945 and normal operation resumed on 2 June, after foyer refurbishments, with the screening of a film by Martin Frič The Second Shift.

=== Kino Moskva (1948–1991) ===
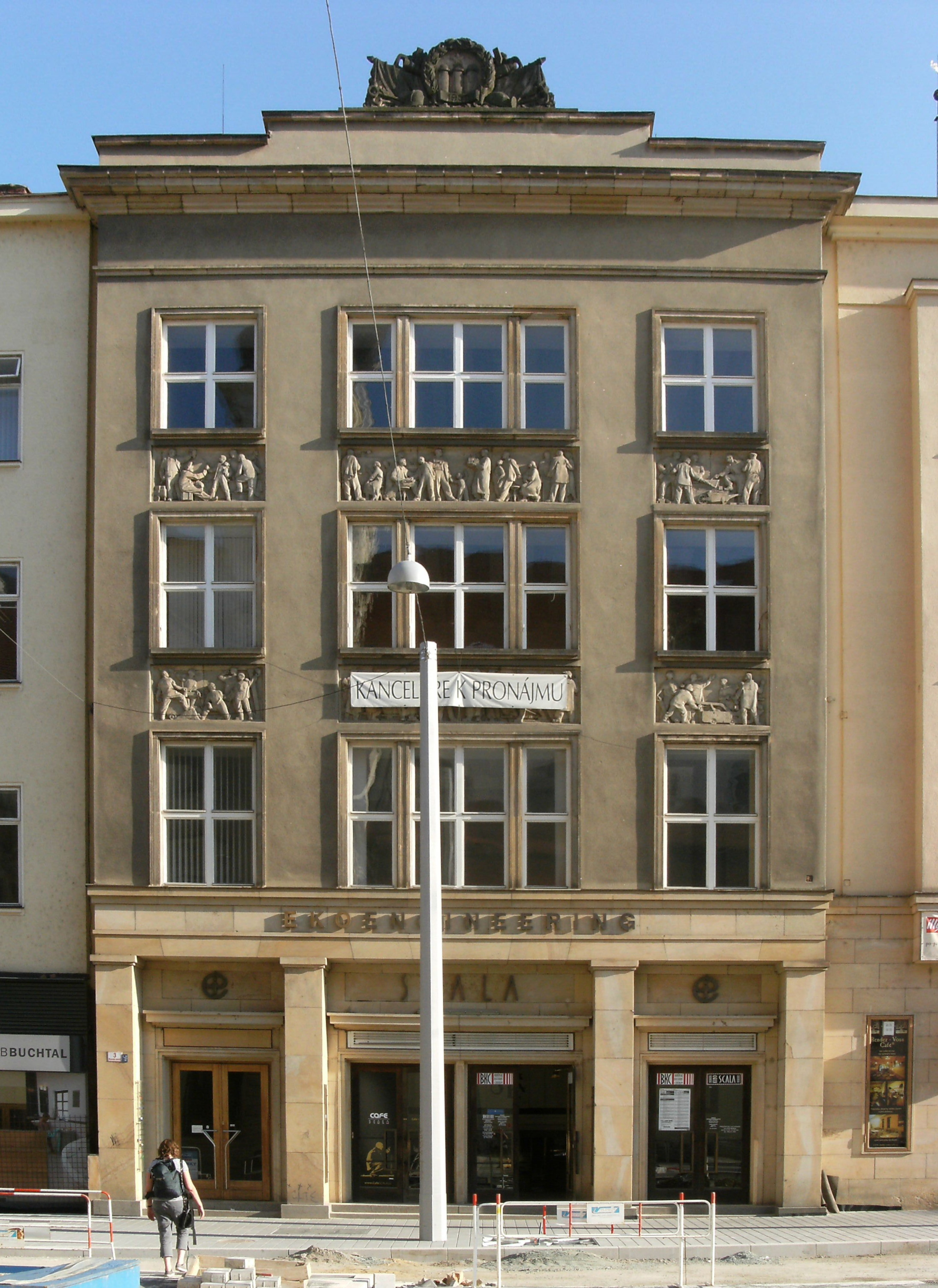
The facade of the building that used to belong the Hutní projekt company (during the reconstruction of the square in 2010)

A nationalization decree from 11 September 1945 nationalized the film industry, production, and distribution including all cinemas. The state-owned enterprise Československý státní film became the authority that supervised the whole industry. On 25 September 1946, Lažanského náměstí (Lažanský Square) was renamed náměstí Rudé armády (Red Army Square) and the cinema later followed suit: on 15 October 1948, it was renamed Moskva (Moscow). In the early 1950s, the fire-damaged building as well as the adjacent houses were reconstructed and the former DOPZ Palace was replaced by an ostentatious building of Hutní projekt built in the style of socialist realism by a Brno architect Lubor Lacina.

A government decree from 16 January 1957 assigned the management of cinemas to "national committees" (local authority councils). Brno established "Správa městských kin", an organisation tasked with managing the city cinemas and led by Antonín Kalášek as its first director, which took over all 29 cinemas in Brno including Moskva from the previous organisation, Krajský filmový podnik. As the cinema was also being reconstructed in 1957, it was closed between 16 June and 21 November that year. It opened on 21 November with a screening of a French-Italian film The Best Part (La Meilleure part) starring Gérard Philipe.

From 21 September 1968, the cinema was renamed back to Scala for a short period of time, but after 26 September 1969 it was called Moskva again. The cinema was closed for repairs between 1971 and 1973, when it was adapted for 70mm films and stereophonic sound. The cinema opened again on 22 November 1973 with a ceremony that included the screening of the movie The Siberian Woman (Сибирячка) by director Aleksei Saltykov to invited guests; regular screenings for the public began on the following day. In the 1980s, the Moskva cinema was one of the best in the city, together with other cinemas in the city centre such as the Družba, Praha, Jalta, and Úderka cinemas. At the same time, it boasted the best equipment in Brno after the above-mentioned reconstruction.

=== Kino Scala (1991–2011) ===
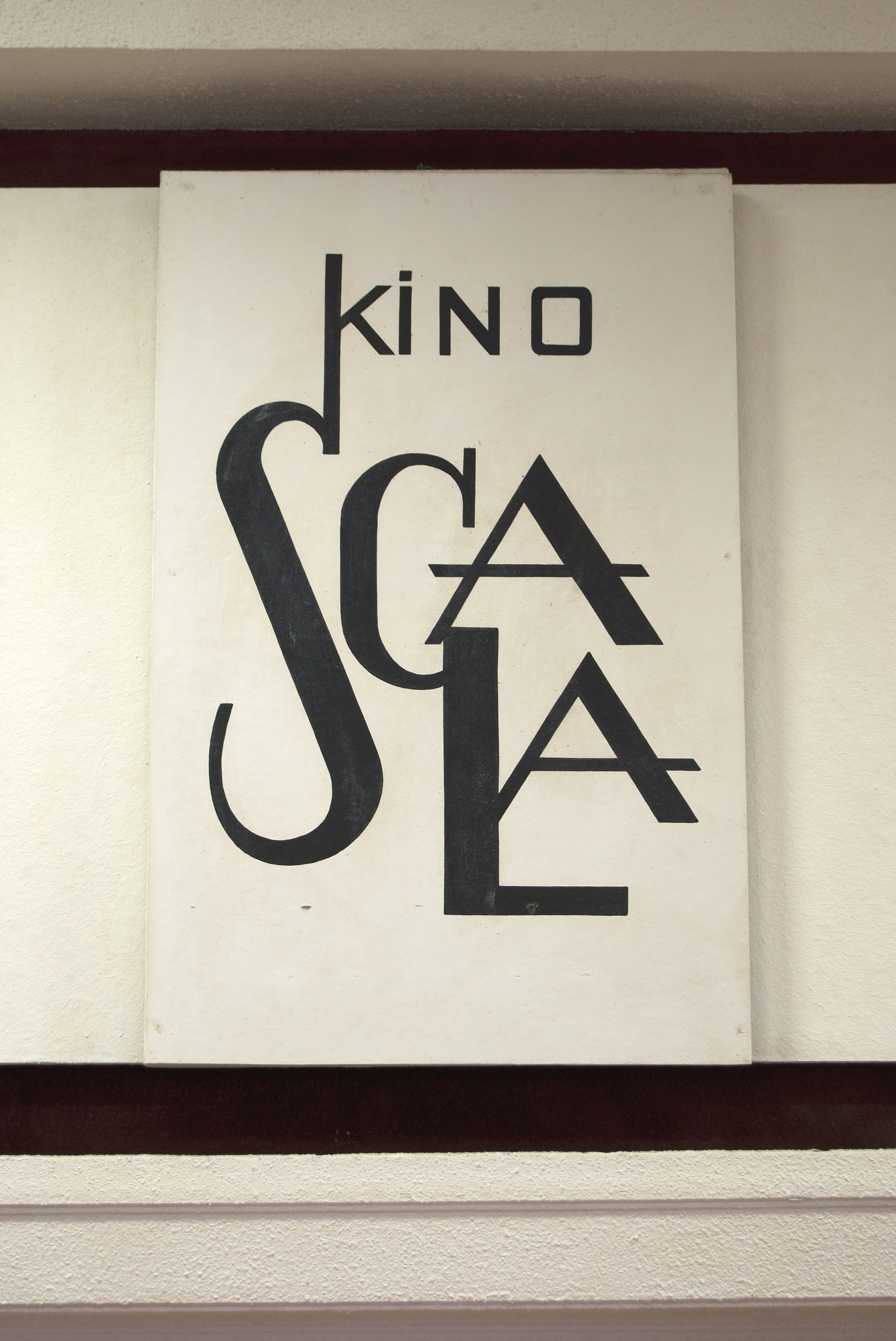
Former logo above the entrance staircase (before the interruption of operation in 2011)

In 1991 – after the Velvet Revolution – the cinema returned to its original name Scala. "Kulturní a informační centrum města Brna" (Brno Cultural and Information Centre) was established the same year and merged with the "Správa městských kin" organisation in November 1994; since 1 January 1995, Scala was officially managed by this new centre. In October 1999, the first multiplex opened in the Olympia shopping mall in Brno: the second in the Czech Republic (Galaxie in Prague was the first) and the first one that met European standards. That year, Scala was the 7th most visited cinema in the Czech Republic with 99,000 visitors, but Olympia already ranked higher and took the 6th place with 120,000 visitors. The second multiplex in Brno, Velký Špalíček, opened in 2001 and single-screen cinemas started closing one by one during the next five years. Scala thus remained one of the last single-screen cinemas in Brno, together with Art and Lucerna. The operator of the city cinemas filed a complaint to the Office for the Protection of Competition against the preferential treatment that multiplexes received from distributors, but was not successful.

At the time, the cinemas were already operated by "Brněnské kulturní centrum" (Brno Cultural Centre), a new organisation established as of 1 January 2005, when the Brno Cultural and Information Centre was split into two independent centres (the other one was "Turistické informační centrum" – Tourist Information Office). However, both centres were reunited in 2008 as Brno Cultural Centre and further organisational changes followed even after that. The number of visitors to the large-scale auditorium in Scala dropped below 16,000 for the first 10 months of 2009; this was 24 times and 30 times less than the rate for the two Brno multiplexes, respectively, and even less than the rate for the smaller Art cinema. Besides a less attractive dramaturgy and the policies of film distributors, the head manager of the city cinemas Daniel Zásměta claimed the cinema needed a large-scale reconstruction, which was made impossible by an action to ascertain the ownership of the building that had been filed by the city of Brno and was of many years' standing. Moreover, Moravské náměstí was being reconstructed in 2009–2010, which made the neighbourhood temporarily less attractive for visitors. The average number of visitors to Scala in 2010 was 37 and the total number per year was 27,713.

On 21 June 2011, the Brno city council approved a change in the deed of foundation of the cinema operator, the Brno Cultural Centre. It changed its name to "Turistické informační centrum" (Tourist Information Centre) and accordingly, the main focus of its activities shifted from culture towards tourism and marketing. While the Art cinema was modernised and digitalised, the city decided to close Scala down. On 5 October, the Brno city council agreed to end the cinema operation by 31 December 2011. The last screening for the public, showing a Canadian co-production film Mr. Nobody, took place on 21 December 2011, and the last screening for schoolchildren took place the next morning.

=== University Cinema Scala (2013–) ===
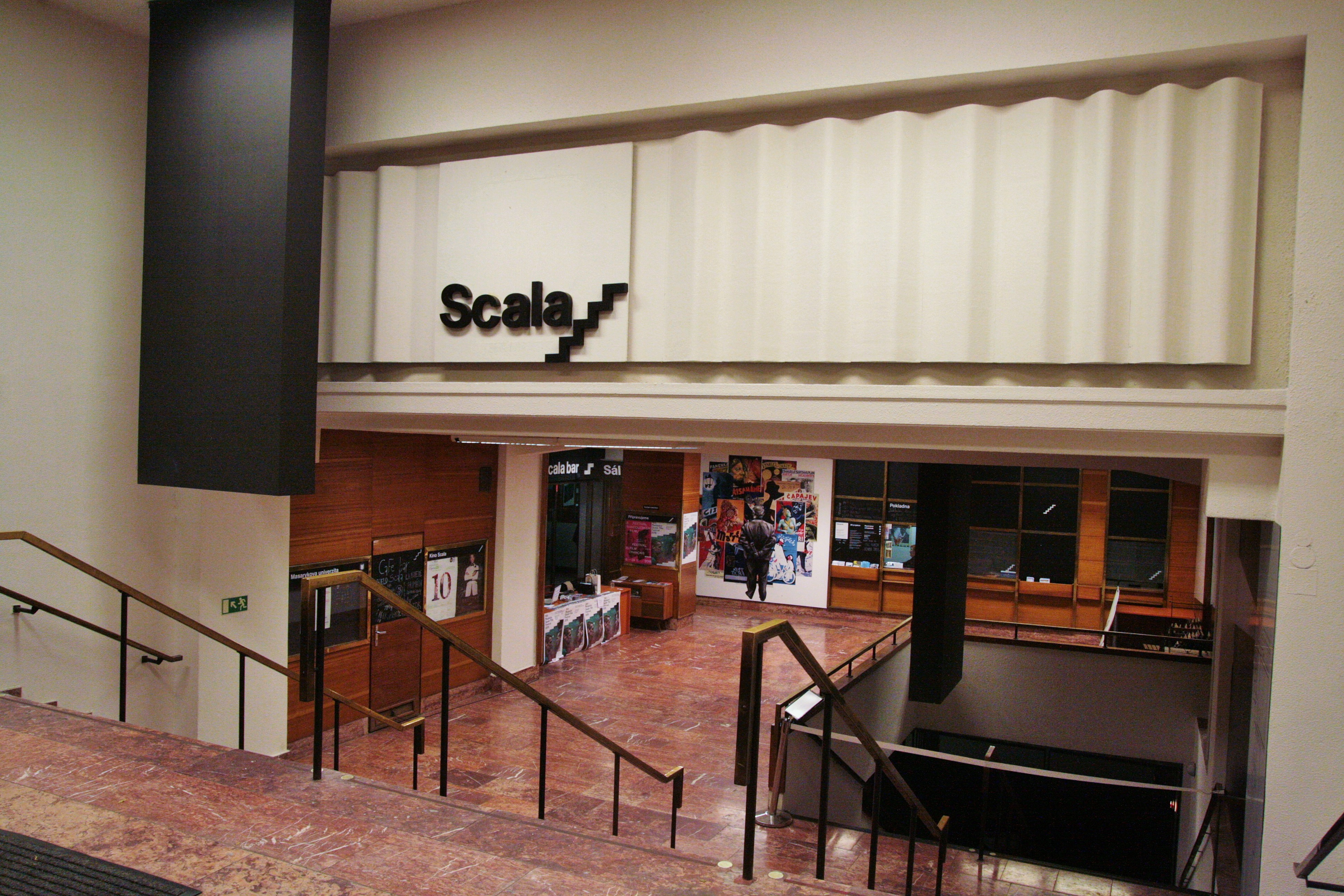
The entrance staircase in 2015

The academic staff of the Department of Film Studies and Audiovisual Culture, Faculty of Arts at Masaryk University protested against the decision to close the cinema and started a petition to keep the cinema in operation. Before releasing a tender, the city of Brno offered to lease the cinema to the Masaryk University for the symbolic yearly rent of one Czech crown and the university expressed an interest in this offer. In March 2012, the university confirmed that it was interested in renting the cinema and announced that it had a partner for the cinema operation. After further negotiations, the Brno city council approved the main points of the contract draft on 27 March 2013 and on 17 April it approved a 30-year lease of the cinema for 1.8 million crowns (€66,600 as of April 2016) a year.

The basic refurbishing of the cinema before its reopening was finished by the end of September 2013. The cost of the refurbishing and subsequent digitalisation of the projection equipment was 12 million crowns. The repairs were paid for by the city of Brno, which then received the money back from the university in the form of rent. The university partnered with Aeropolis, a cinema operator that had already had some experience with running independent cinemas in Prague and Hradec Králové and was charged with ensuring year-round film screenings. Moreover, the university began to use the cinema for academic purposes as a lecture and conference hall and space for graduation and matriculation ceremonies. The cinema opened for the public on 14 October 2013 with a ceremony that included the screening of a unique interactive film project Kinoautomat: Člověk a jeho dům.

== Facilities and equipment ==
The cinema was originally established as a part of the multi-purpose DOPZ Palace building. In the late 1920s, the building consisted of offices, a large conference, dance, and theatre hall on the ground floor, the Biber cafe on the first and second floors and the cinema itself in the basement.

The basement location was originally a problem, as the lowest point in the auditorium was more than 7 metres (23 ft) below the pavement level by the main entrance at Moravské náměstí (then called Lažanského náměstí), while the then-applicable ministerial decree only allowed a depth of 6 metres (20 ft). For this reason, the local authorities refused to approve the licence application on 31 October 1928. The re-submitted application therefore cited the entrance from Jakubské náměstí, which lies below Moravské náměstí, as the main entrance, and the relative depth of the auditorium was thus reduced to 5.77 metres (18.9 ft). The number of seats was also determined during the occupancy permit procedure: 562 seats in the stalls and 238 on the balconies, altogether 800 seats, which was the maximum capacity allowed by the ministerial decree for underground cinemas. During the remodelling of the cinema in 1931, the operator received a permission to change the seating arrangements in the auditorium: by removing the boxes on the sides, the cinema was able to offer 304 seats on the balconies and 702 stalls seats (altogether 1,006 seats). There were further changes in May of the same year that brought the seating capacity of the cinema up to 700 + 312 or 1,012 seats. Measured by seating capacity, Bio Dopz was the largest cinema in Brno. In 1932, the waiting room was turned into a smoking lounge; afterwards, the foyer served as the waiting space.

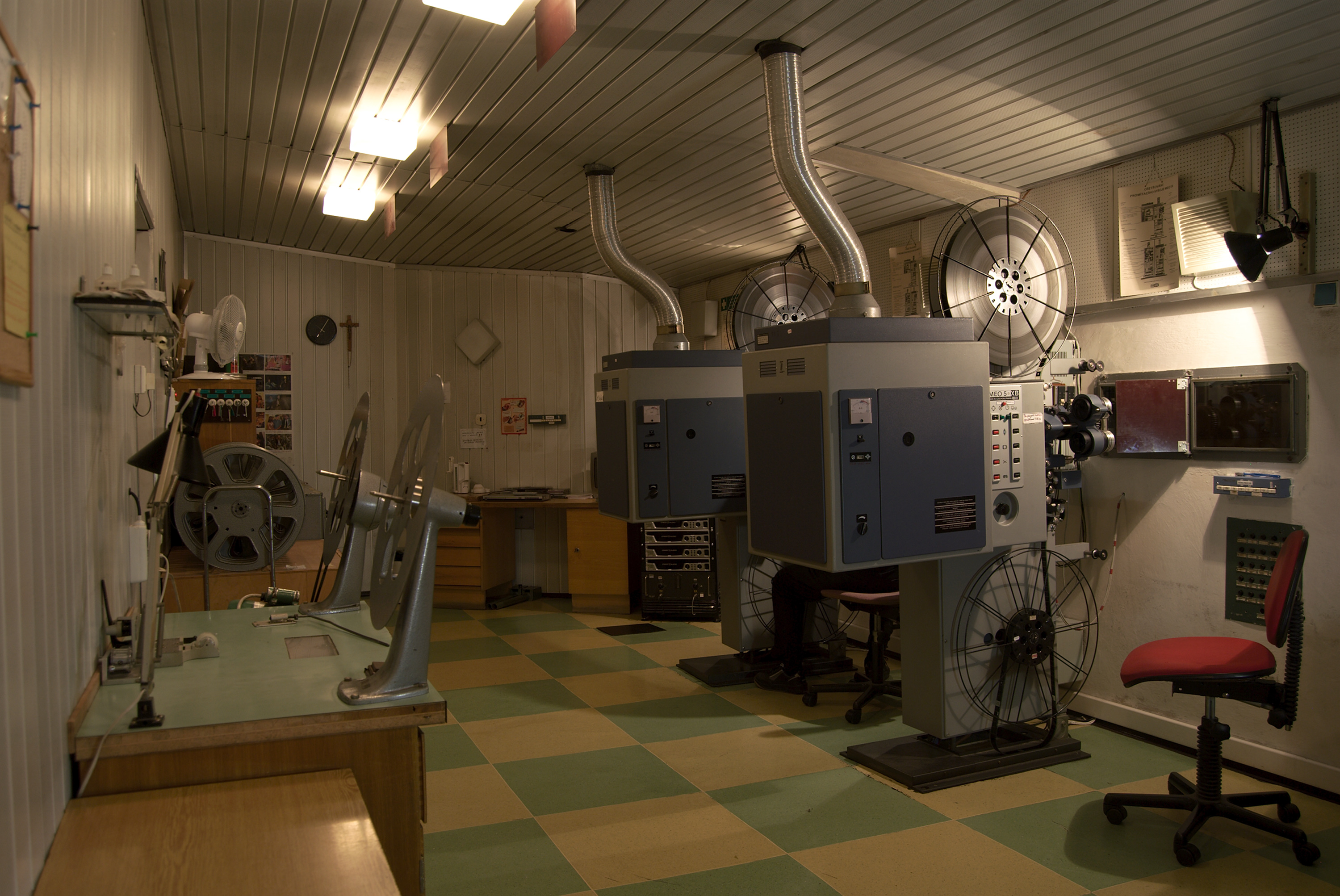
The cinema projection box with two Meo 5-XB projectors in 2011

In 1957, the cinema was rebuilt for widescreen projection using the CinemaScope system. At the same time, the balcony on the sides of the auditorium was demolished and new seats were installed and rearranged to provide 550 seats in the stalls and 200 on the balcony. The original spiral staircase was also removed as well as the projection box, which was moved to another part of the basement with an entrance right next to the auditorium entrance. The cash desk in the upper foyer was divided into two.

The cinema obtained equipment allowing panoramic 70mm film projection during the next round of remodelling and repairs, which took place in 1971–1973 based on a project prepared by architect Jaroslav Šmídek. The projection box received two UM 70/35 projectors and one ME 9 projector and a 6-channel amplifier system was installed to ensure stereo sound. The smoking lounge was turned into a bar; the cash desks were moved opposite the entrance staircase and an office took their place. Again, new seats were installed in the auditorium: the new arrangement saw the seating capacity decrease to 328 stalls seats and 145 balcony seats (altogether 473 seats). Thanks to these changes, the Moskva cinema, as it was called at the time, became the best-equipped cinema in Brno.

The latest refurbishing took place in 2013, when the cinema obtained digital equipment for projection in 4K and in the Dolby Digital Plus 7.1 sound format.

== Photo gallery ==
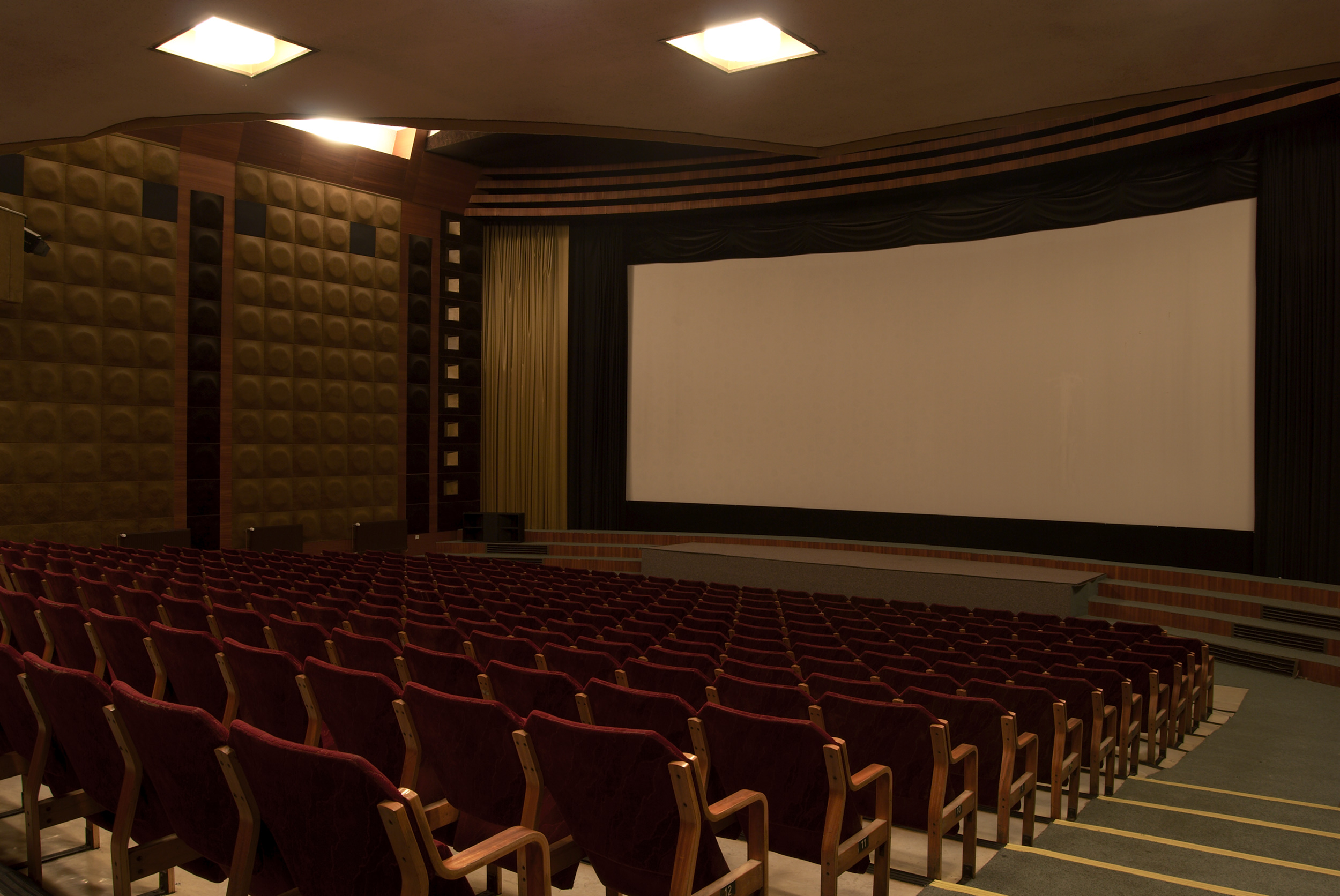
University Cinema Scala – view of the screen

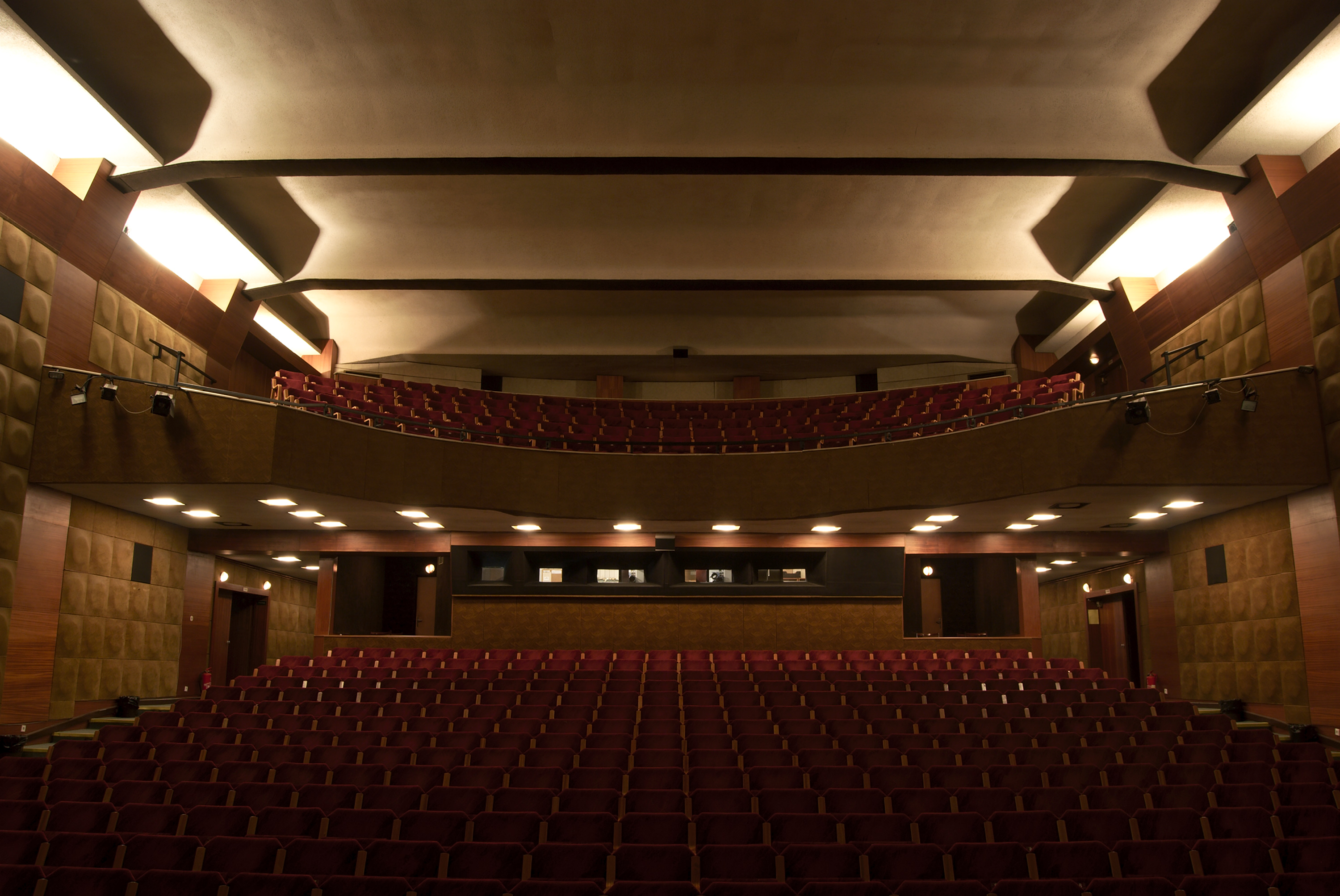
University Cinema Scala – view from the screen to the auditorium
