= Amelia Adamo =

Swedish editor-in-chief (born 1947)

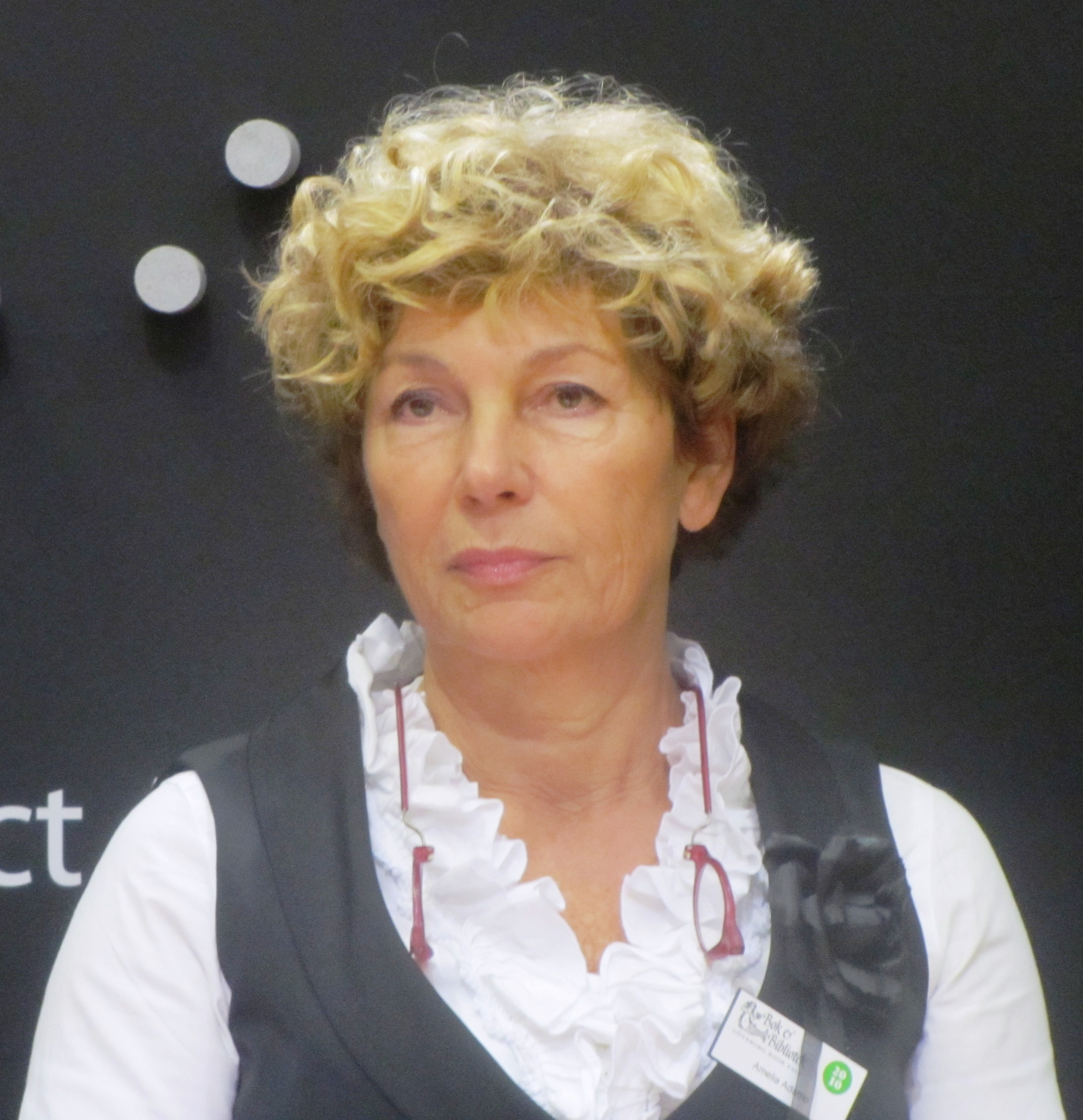
Amelia Adamo (2010)

Amelia Adamo (born 24 February 1947) is a Swedish journalist. She established several women's magazines and worked as an editor-in-chief.

== Biography ==
She was born in Rome, Italy, and went to Sweden soon after her birth. She received a degree in social sciences. She has worked on magazines such as Svensk Damtidning, Husmodern and VeckoRevyn. She was the editor-in-chief of the latter. Adamo started the magazines Amelia (1995), Tara (2000) and M-magasin (2006).

Adamo has married three times. She first married Lars Ericsson who was the summer editor-in-chief at Svensk Damtidning. They had two sons, and Ericsson died of cancer. Her second husband was Thorbjörn Larsson, former chief editor of Aftonbladet. Her third husband is an Italian.

Adamo is the grand prize recipient of the Swedish Magazine Publishers Association in 2011.

== Honours ==
- (Sweden) H. M. The King's Medal, 8th size, worn on a blue ribbon (6 June 2026)
