= Husmodern =

Women's magazine in Sweden (1917–1988)

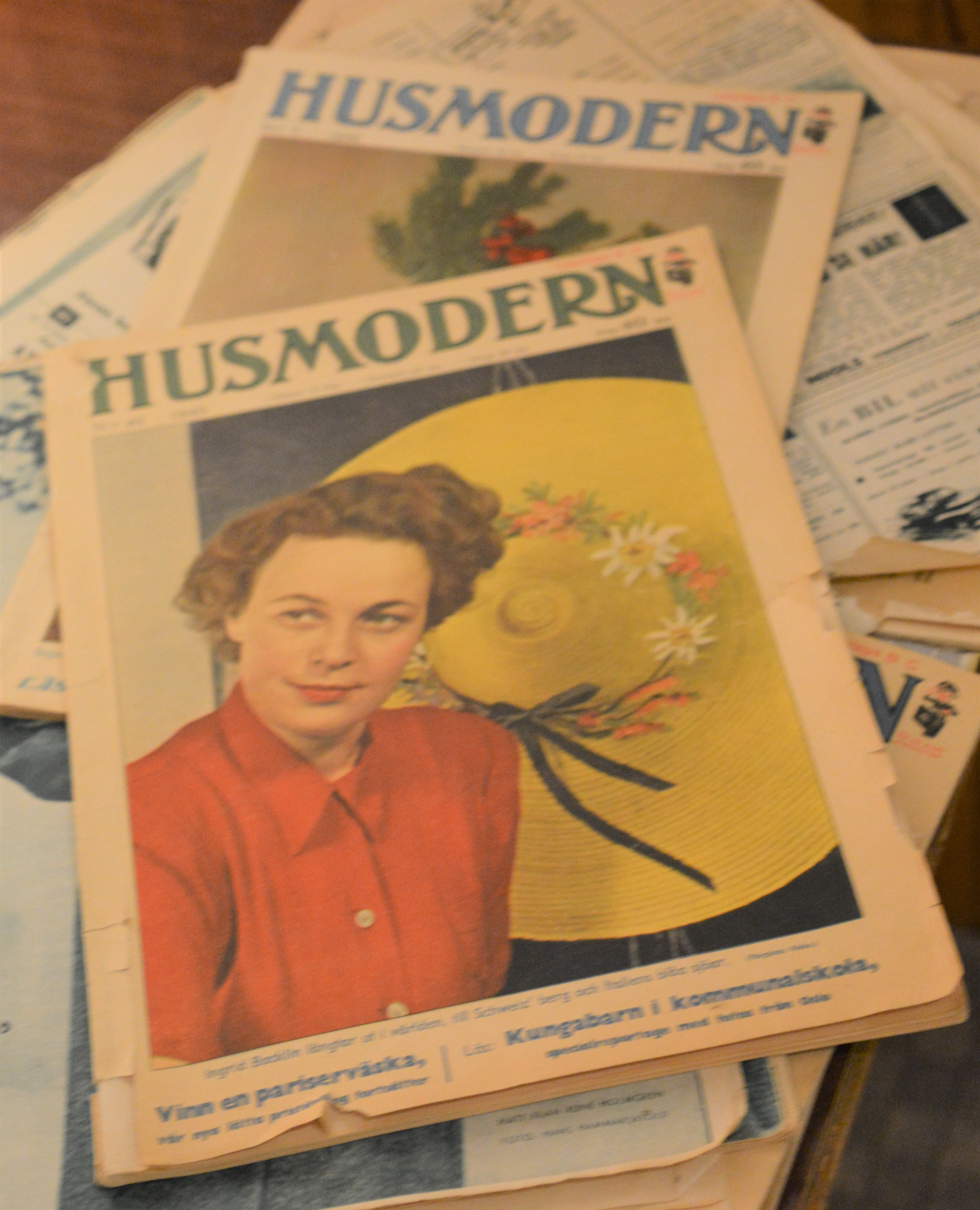
- Editions of Husmodern ca. 1950s
- Categories: Women's Magazine
- Frequency: Weekly
- Founder: Thora Holm; Elsa Nyblom
- Founded: 1917
- Final issue: 1988
- Company: Husmodern; Åhlén & Åkerlund
- Country: Sweden
- Based in: Stockholm
- Language: Swedish
- ISSN: 0018-8026
- OCLC: 1027568168

Husmodern (Swedish: The Housewife) was a women's magazine which was published in Stockholm, Sweden, between 1917 and 1988.

== History and profile ==
Husmodern was started in Stockholm in 1917 and was published by a company with the same name. The founding organization was Martta. The subtitle of the magazine was de svenska husmödrarnas tidning (Swedish: the Swedish housewives' newspaper). Its founders were Thora Holm and the journalist Elsa Nyblom. The latter was also the first editor of Husmodern. The magazine was acquired by the Åhlén & Åkerlund company in 1920. Following this its subtitle was redesigned as tidskrift för hemmet och kvinnan (Swedish: magazine for the home and the woman). A pattern department was also formed belonging to the magazine after its acquisition by Åhlén & Åkerlund which became part of Bonnier Group in 1929. The magazine delivered a supplement entitled Stil-mönster (Swedish: Style-Patterns) which contained samples of the Swedish patterns between 1941 and 1982.

Husmodern came out weekly throughout its run. The magazine was among the popular periodicals in the country and reached its highest circulation in 1970 selling 290,000 copies. Its title was Nya Husmodern (Swedish: Modern Housewife) from 1982 to its closure in 1988.

Husmodern had a Finnish edition entitled Emäntälehti. Some issues of Husmodern were archived by Carolina Rediviva library in Uppsala, Sweden.

== Audience, content and editors ==
In the initial years Husmodern targeted rural women. The target audience of the magazine was middle-class housewives living in cities from 1938.

The coverage of Husmodern was expanded from 1920, and it contained many appealing advertisements. It frequently featured life of Carl Emil Pettersson, a Swedish adevnturer, in the 1930s. In the period between 1930 and 1950 the first ten of its total 60–80 pages included the advertisements of household appliances, make up products, food, language courses and bikes. One of the frequent topics was dressmaking patterns during the World War II period. In addition, Husmodern was one of the Swedish publications which featured news materials provided by the Swedish Intelligence Agency during the same era. The magazine also included the following sections: recipes, home decoration, news, and short stories.

One of the editors-in-chief of Husmodern was Fanny Hult. Another editor-in-chief was Amelia Adamo who had worked as a reporter for the magazine.
