= Amelia (magazine) =

Swedish women's magazine

- Editor-in-chief: Karin Nordin
- Former editors: Amelia Adamo
- Categories: Women's magazine; Lifestyle magazine
- Frequency: Biweekly
- Publisher: Bonnier Tidskrifter
- Founder: Amelia Adamo
- Founded: 1995; 30 years ago
- Company: Bonnier
- Country: Sweden
- Based in: Stockholm
- Language: Swedish
- Website: Amelia
- ISSN: 1400-6057
- OCLC: 1201412396

Amelia is a biweekly lifestyle and women's magazine published in Stockholm, Sweden. It has been in circulation since 1995.

== History and profile ==
Amelia was started in 1995. Amelia Adamo is the founder and the first editor-in-chief of the magazine, which is part of Bonnier media group. The magazine is published by Bonnier Tidskrifter. It targets women aged 25–45 years.

Amelia is published on a biweekly basis, and its headquarters is in Stockholm. Åsa Lundegård served as the editor-in-chief. In May 2018 Kardin Nordin was named as the editor-in-chief of the magazine. The website of the magazine was integrated into that of Expressen in 2020.

There are eight annual spinoffs of the magazine, including Amelia Christmas, Amelia Baby, and Amelia Summer.

Amelia was named by the Swedish Magazine Publishers Association as the magazine of the year in 1997.

== Circulation ==
The circulation of Amelia in its first year, 1995, was 91,000 copies. In 1998 its circulation rose to 119,000 copies and 128,000 copies in 1999.

In 2007, its circulation was 113,000 copies. The magazine sold 90,000 copies in 2013 and 80,300 copies in 2014.

== See also ==
- List of magazines in Sweden
