= František Janouch =

Czech physicist and writer (1931–2024)

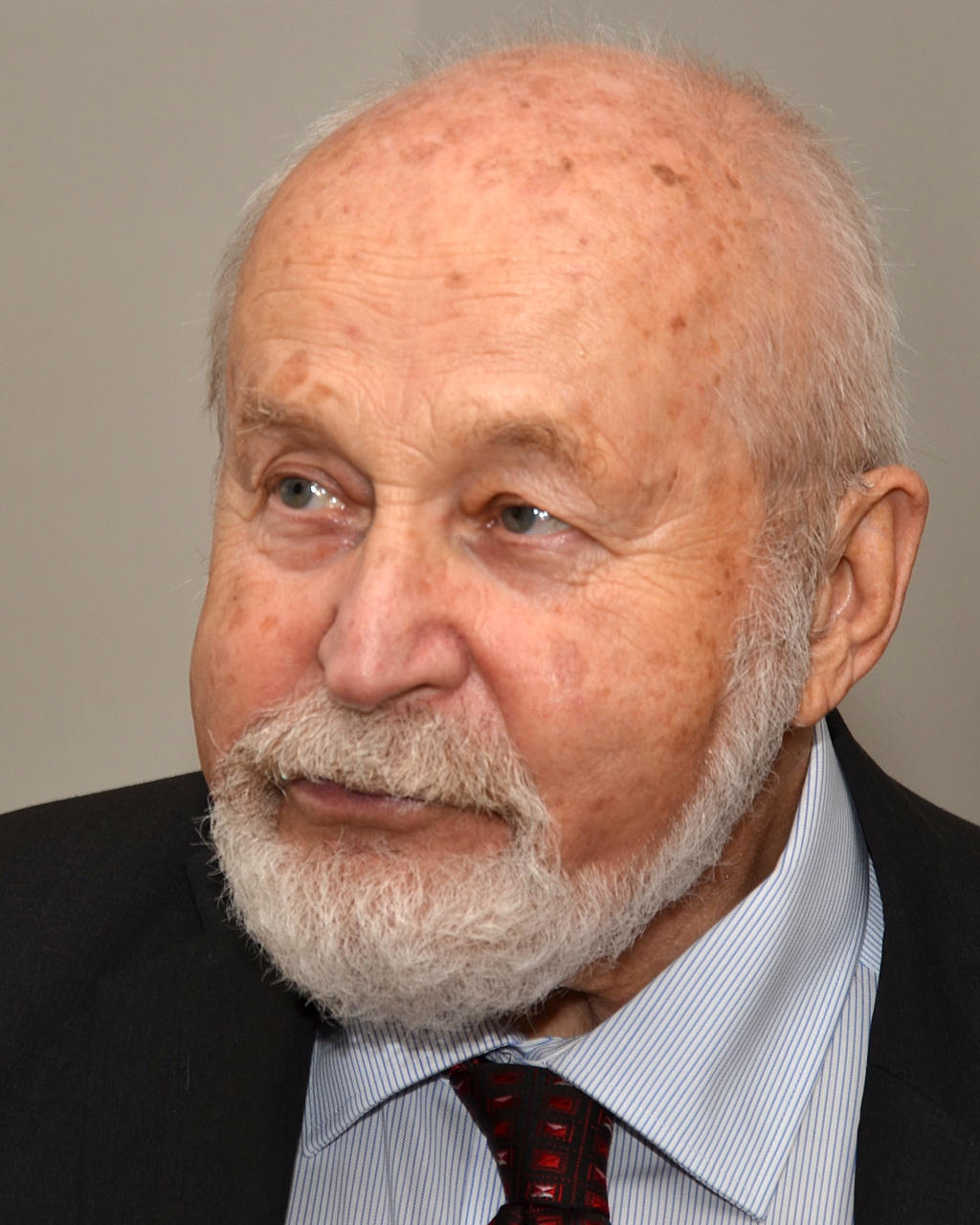
- Janouch in 2016
- Born: 22 August 1931; Lysá nad Labem, Czechoslovakia
- Died: 12 January 2024 (aged 92); Stockholm, Sweden
- Education: Faculty of Physics of St. Petersburg State University
- Occupations: Nuclear physicist, author
- Years active: 1974–2024
- Movement: Charter 77 Foundation
- Spouse: Ada Kolmanová
- Children: 2, including Katerina
- Relatives: Arnošt Kolman, father-in-law
- Awards: Silver Medal of the Chairman of the Senate (2012); Medal of Merit (2001)

František Janouch (22 September 1931 – 12 January 2024) was a Czech nuclear physicist, author and dissident. While still a high-school student in 1948, he joined the Communist Party of Czechoslovakia. He was later expelled and stripped of his citizenship at the time of normalization. In 1978 in Stockholm, he co-founded and chaired the Charter 77 Foundation to support Czechoslovak Charter 77 signatories from abroad.

== Personal life ==
František Janouch died in Stockholm, Sweden on 12 January 2024, at the age of 92.

Janouch's daughter, Katerina Janouch, is a Swedish journalist, far-right politician, and author.
