= Tanga people =

Ethnic group in Papua New Guinea

Tanga people is a tribe of Papua New Guinea that lives in the Tanga Islands and Feni Islands of Tanir Rural LLG and three villages (Sena, Muliama and Warangansau) in the Matalai Rural LLG of Namatanai District of New Ireland Province. They speak the Tangga language which has since been split into three separate languages which are now spoken by the Tangans. These languages are: Niwer Mil, Warwar Feni and Fanamaket. Their population according to the 2011 Papua New Guinea Census Report is 12,466 people. Tubuan, Sokapana and Ingiet are the secret societies practised by the Tanga people. F.L.S. Bell has a collection on Tanga Islands in the University of Sydney Library in Australia.
