= Niwer Mil language =

Austronesian language

Niwer Mil
- Native to: Papua New Guinea
- Region: Boang, Malendok, Lif and Tefa, Tanga Islands
- Native speakers: 9,033 (2011 census)
- Language family: Austronesian: Malayo-Polynesian; Oceanic; Western Oceanic; Meso-Melanesian; St. George; Niwer Mil

Language codes
- ISO 639-3: hrc
- Glottolog: niwe1234

The Niwer Mil language is spoken by 9,033 people on Boang Island, Malendok Island, Lif Island and Tefa Island in the Tanga Islands, Namatanai District of New Ireland Province in Papua New Guinea. It was split from the Tangga language in 2013. It is one of the languages that form the St George linkage group of Meso-Melanesian languages.
