= Watpi =

- Village
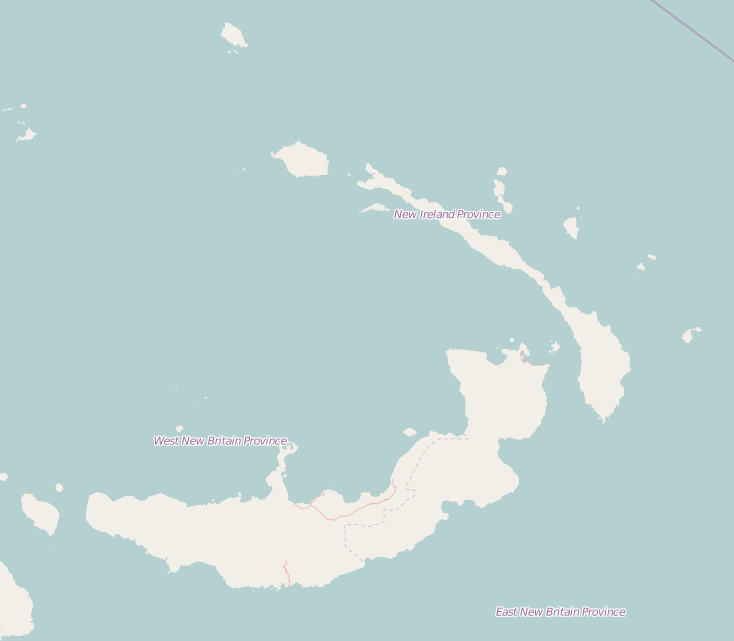
- Location
- Coordinates: 4°21′S 152°41′E
- Country: Papua New Guinea
- Province: New Ireland Province
- District: Namatanai District

Watpi is a village on the south-west coast of New Ireland, Papua New Guinea, north of Kait. The villagers speak the Kandas language. Traditionally the chief of Watpi has three wives. It is located in Konoagil Rural LLG.
