= Lihir =

Lihir can refer to:

- Lihir Group, an island group in Papua New Guinea
- Lihir Island, the main island in the group
- Lihir language, an Austronesian language spoken in the Lihir island group
- Lihir Gold, a gold mining company
