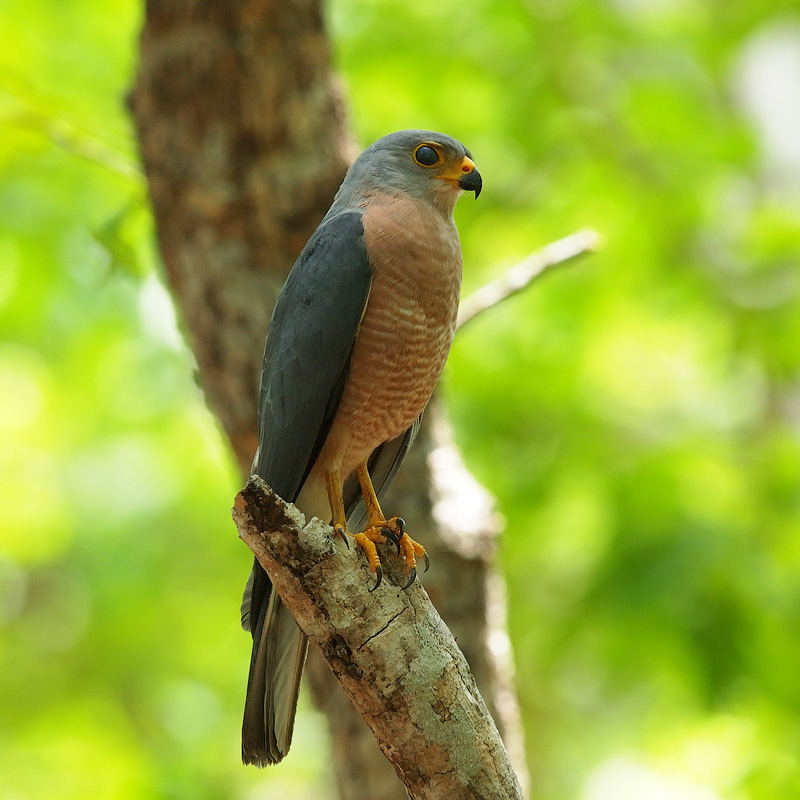

Conservation status
- Least Concern (IUCN 3.1)

Scientific classification
- Kingdom: Animalia
- Phylum: Chordata
- Class: Aves
- Order: Accipitriformes
- Family: Accipitridae
- Genus: Tachyspiza
- Species: T. hiogaster

Binomial name
- Tachyspiza hiogaster (Müller, S, 1841)

= Variable goshawk =

Species of bird

The variable goshawk (Tachyspiza hiogaster) is a bird of prey native to Indonesia, Papua New Guinea and the Solomon Islands. It was recently elevated to species status, and was previously lumped together with the grey goshawk. This species was formerly placed in the genus Accipiter.

== Subspecies ==
Twenty-two subspecies are recognised:

- T. h. sylvestris (Wallace, 1864) – Sumbawa to Alor Island (west, central Lesser Sunda Islands). Lesser Sundas goshawk is sometimes elevated to species status.
- T. h. polionota (Salvadori, 1889) – Damar Island and Babar Islands (east Lesser Sunda Islands), Banda and Tanimbar is. (south Moluccas)
- T. h. mortyi (Hartert, EJO, 1925) – Morotai (north Moluccas)
- T. h. griseogularis (Gray, GR, 1861) – Halmahera, Ternate, Tidore and Bacan Islands (north Moluccas) and Gebe (northwest of New Guinea)
- T. h. obiensis (Hartert, EJO, 1903) – Obi Islands (central north Moluccas)
- T. h. hiogaster (Müller, S, 1841) – Kelang (north of northwest Seram), Seram, Saparua (south of west Seram) and Ambon (central east Moluccas)
- T. h. pallidiceps (Salvadori, 1879) – Buru (central west Moluccas)
- T. h. albiventris (Salvadori, 1876) – Tayandu Islands and Kai Islands (southeast Moluccas)
- T. h. leucosoma (Sharpe, 1874) – New Guinea and many satellites
- T. h. misoriensis (Salvadori, 1876) – Biak (Geelvink Bay islands, northwest New Guinea)
- T. h. pallidimas (Mayr, 1940) – D'Entrecasteaux Archipelago (east of southeast New Guinea)
- T. h. misulae (Mayr, 1940) – Misima and Tagula Island (west, central, Louisiade Archipelago, east of southeast New Guinea)
- T. h. lavongai (Mayr, 1945) – New Hanover Island, New Ireland and Dyaul Island (south of northwest New Ireland; northeast Bismarck Archipelago)
- T. h. matthiae (Mayr, 1945) – Mussau Island (St Matthias Islands, central north Bismarck Archipelago)
- T. h. manusi (Mayr, 1945) – Admiralty Islands (northwest Bismarck Archipelago)
- T. h. dampieri (Gurney, JH Sr, 1882) – Umboi Island (west of New Britain) and New Britain and satellites (southeast Bismarck Archipelago)
- T. h. lihirensis (Stresemann, 1933) – Lihir Island and Tanga Islands (east of central New Ireland; northeast Bismarck Archipelago)
- T. h. bougainvillei (Rothschild & Hartert, EJO, 1905) – Buka Island, Bougainville Island and Shortland Islands (north Solomon Islands)
- T. h. rufoschistacea (Rothschild & Hartert, EJO, 1902) – Choiseul Island, Santa Isabel and Florida Islands (central east Solomon Islands)
- T. h. rubianae (Rothschild & Hartert, EJO, 1905) – New Georgia (central west Solomon Islands, except Ranongga)
- T. h. malaitae (Mayr, 1931) – Malaita (southeast Solomon Islands)
- T. h. pulchella (Ramsay, EP, 1882) – Guadalcanal (southeast Solomon Islands)
