= Matatai =

- Village
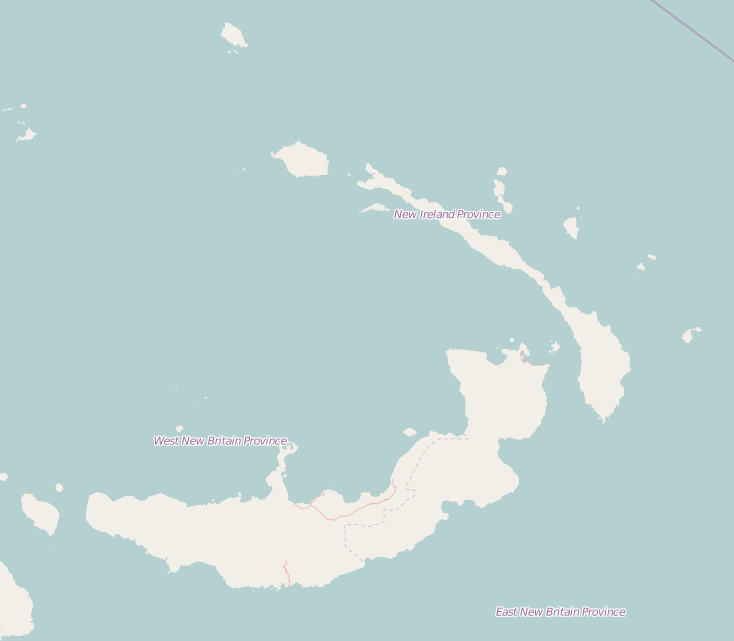
- Location
- Coordinates: 4°47′17″S 152°54′46″E
- Country: Papua New Guinea
- Province: New Ireland Province
- District: Namatanai District

Matatai is a village in the south coast of New Ireland, Papua New Guinea, on Lanisso Bay. It is located in Konoagil Rural LLG.
