= Nimamar Rural LLG =

Local-level government in Papua New Guinea

- Location of Nimamar Rural LLG in Namatanai District of New Ireland Province in Papua New Guinea
- Country: Papua New Guinea
- Province: New Ireland Province
- Time zone: UTC+10 (AEST)

District map of New Ireland Province

Nimamar Rural LLG is a local government area in New Ireland Province, Papua New Guinea. The LLG administers the Lihir Group of islands. The LLG is located in Namatanai District and contains the Lihir Gold Mine, which is the second largest gold deposit in the world. Main language spoken here is the Lihir language. Many speakers of other languages are present here due to the mining on the island. Commonly are Niwer Mil language, Kuanua language and Mandara language.

The current LLG president is Ambrose Silul who is also the Deputy Governor of New Ireland. The total population of the LLG is 25,608 (Census 2011).

== Wards ==
- 01. Londolovit
- 02. Puput
- 03. Matakues
- 04. Lataul
- 05. Komat
- 06. Pangoh
- 07. Hurtol
- 08. Samo
- 09. Lamboar
- 10. Kosmaium
- 11. Kuanie
- 12. Malie
- 13. Malal
- 14. Ton
- 15. Mahur
- 84. Londolovit Township
