= Kabaman =

- Village
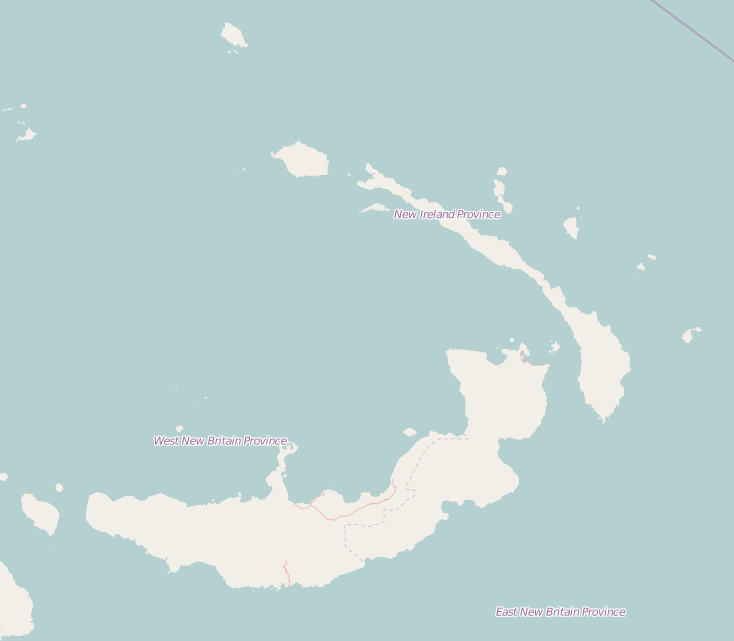
- Location
- Coordinates: 4°36′S 152°43′E
- Country: Papua New Guinea
- Province: New Ireland Province
- District: Namatanai District

Kabaman is a village that is located on the south-west coast of New Ireland, Papua New Guinea, south of Kait and north of Lamassa. The people speak the Siar-Lak language. It is located in Konoagil Rural LLG.
