= Lambom =

- Village
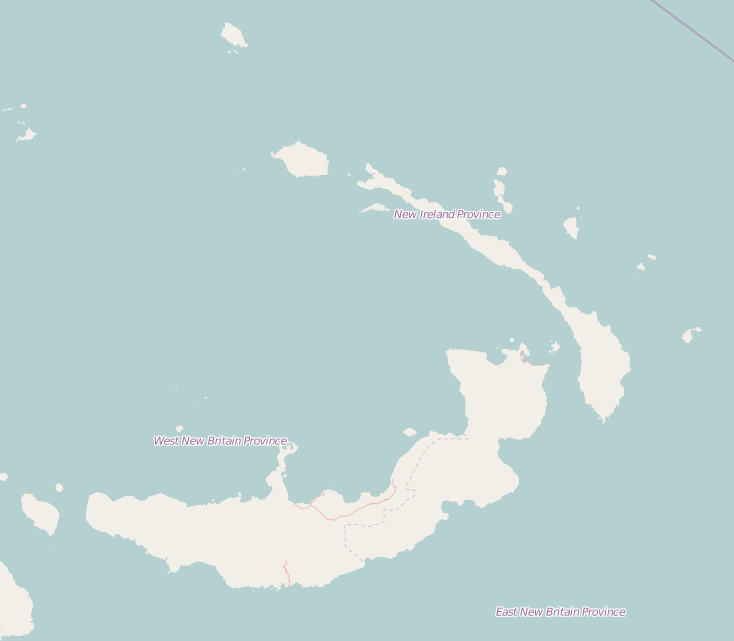
- Location
- Coordinates: 4°48′S 152°51′E
- Country: Papua New Guinea
- Province: New Ireland Province
- District: Namatanai District

Lambom is a village on the south-west coast of New Ireland, Papua New Guinea, south of Lamassa. Lambom Island lies off the coast. It is located in Konoagil Rural LLG.
