= Weilo =

- Village
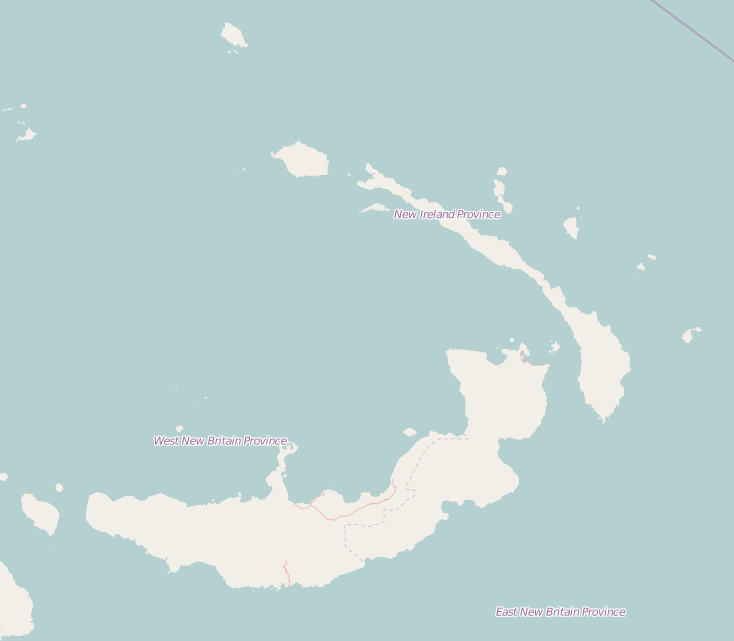
- Location
- Coordinates: 4°05′53″S 152°59′37″E
- Country: Papua New Guinea
- Province: New Ireland Province
- District: Namatanai District

Weilo is a village on the south-eastern coast of New Ireland, Papua New Guinea. The Weilo River flows nearby. It is located in Konoagil Rural LLG.
