= Beriota =

- Village
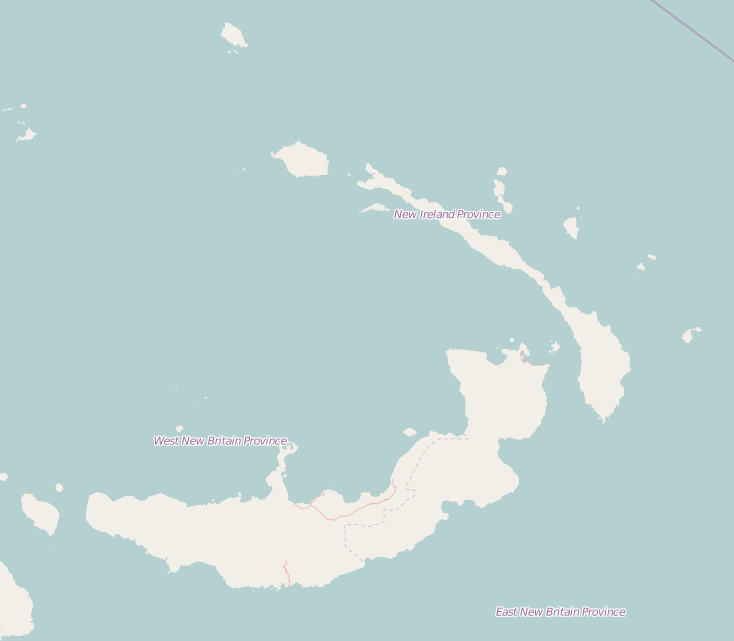
- Location
- Coordinates: 4°43′S 152°58′E
- Country: Papua New Guinea
- Province: New Ireland Province
- District: Namatanai District

Beriota is a village on the south-eastern coast of New Ireland, Papua New Guinea. It lies to the north-east of Bakop, and is located in Konoagil Rural LLG. There is coral in the area.
