= Tanir Rural LLG =

Local-level government in Papua New Guinea

- Location of Tanir Rural LLG in Namatanai District of New Ireland Province in Papua New Guinea
- Country: Papua New Guinea
- Province: New Ireland Province
- Time zone: UTC+10 (AEST)

District map of New Ireland Province

Tanir Rural LLG is a local government area in New Ireland Province, Papua New Guinea since 2008. The LLG administers the Tanga Islands and the Feni Islands. Tanir is a portmanteau word from the two island names which are Tanga and Anir.

Population is 15,271 as per 2021 Papua New Guinea Census estimates Report. Two languages spoken here, split from Tangga language with the Niwer Mil language spoken on Tanga Islands and Warwar Feni language spoken on Feni Islands. Ward 1-9 are on Tanga Island while Wards 10-14 on Anir Islands. The current LLG President is Hon. Roland Tumsok Funmat MPA (Member for Provincial Assembly) elected in the 2025 LLG elections. Former LLG Presidents are Felix Kaltubim, Alfred Lafen and Bruno Parbil.

== Wards ==
- 01. Taonsip
- 02. Fonli
- 03. Kamunaseo
- 04. Amfar
- 05. Sungkin
- 06. Put
- 07. Nonu
- 08. Lif
- 09. Tefa
- 10. Natong
- 11. Basakla
- 12. Warantaban
- 13. Kamgot
- 14. Balngit
