= Bakop =

- Village
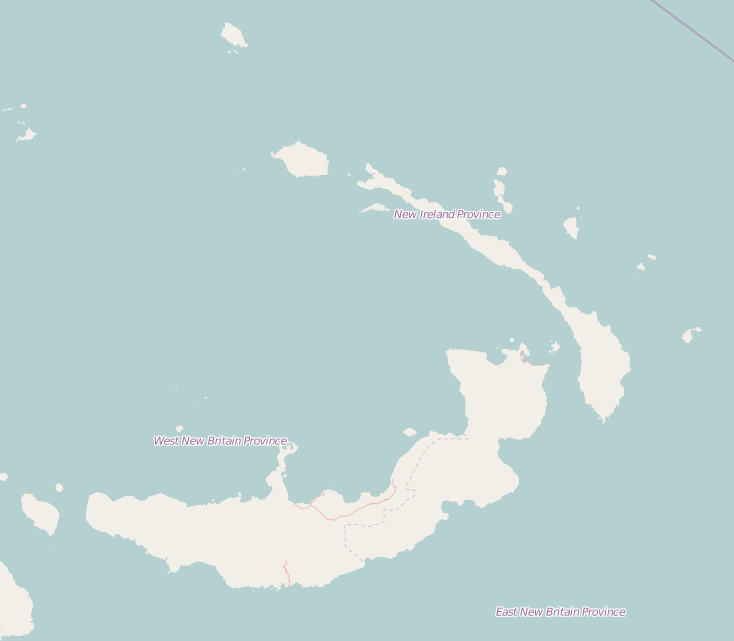
- Location
- Coordinates: 4°45′S 152°57′E
- Country: Papua New Guinea
- Province: New Ireland Province
- District: Namatanai District

Bakop is a village on the south coast of New Ireland, Papua New Guinea. It is located in Konoagil Rural LLG. The vertical cliffs nearby are said to be "a product of a localised limestone outcrop."
