= Namatanai Open =

National parliamentary electorate in Papua New Guinea

Namatanai Open is an open electorate in New Ireland Province, Papua New Guinea. It is one of the province's three electorates and returns a single member to the National Parliament of Papua New Guinea.

Former Prime Minister Sir Julius Chan held the seat from 1968 until 1997. Ephraim Apelis represented it from 1997 to 2002. Chan's son Byron Chan, of the People's Progress Party, won the seat in 2002 and held it until 2017, latterly as Minister for Mining, before losing to Walter Schnaubelt. Schnaubelt, of the National Alliance, has represented the electorate since 2017 and was re-elected at the 2022 general election.

In 2024, Schnaubelt promoted the creation of a separate Konos Open electorate from part of the Namatanai District for the 2027 general election.
