= Ambitle =

Island in Papua New Guinea

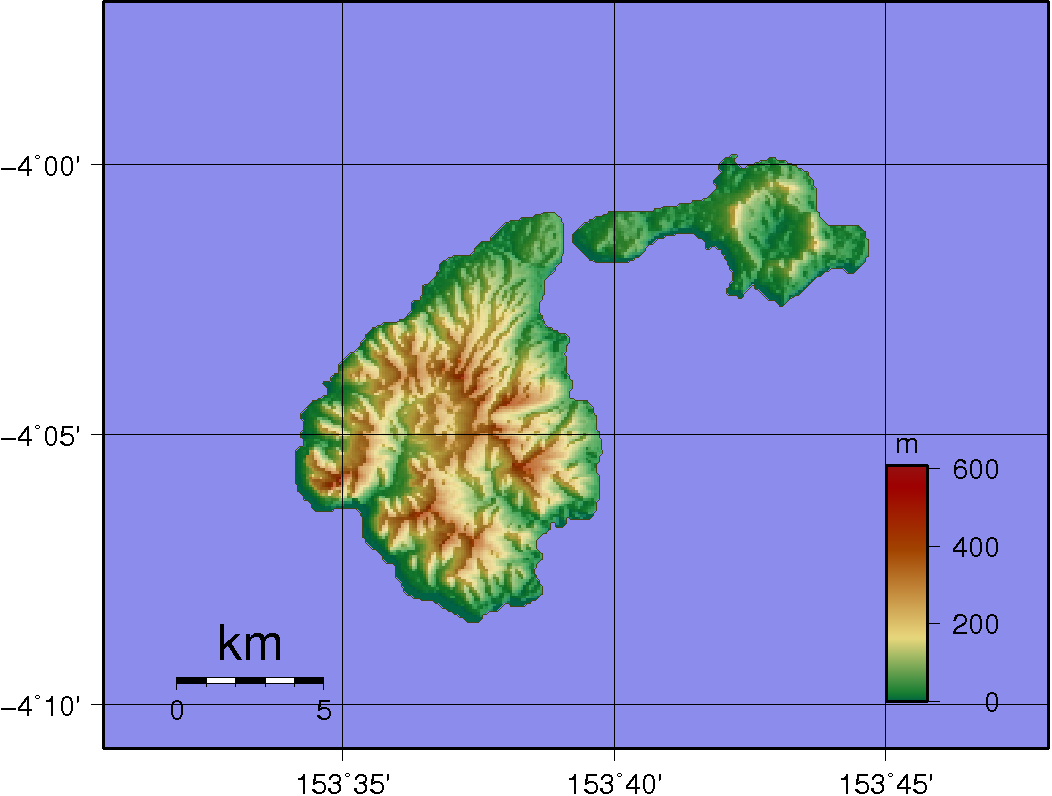
- Topographic map of Feni Islands. Ambitle is the larger island on the left.

Highest point
- Elevation: 450 m (1,480 ft)
- Prominence: 450 m (1,480 ft)
- Listing: Volcanoes of Papua New Guinea
- Coordinates: 4°05′S 153°39′E

Geography
- Location: Bismarck Archipelago, Papua New Guinea

Geology
- Mountain type: Stratovolcano
- Last eruption: 350 BCE ± 100 years

Ambitle is a volcanic island on the South Bismarck plate which, together with Babase, another volcanic island, makes up the Feni Islands in the Bismarck Archipelago. The island is located within the Papua New Guinea's New Ireland Province, to the east of the island of New Ireland. It is part of the Tanir Rural LLG local government area.

Ambitle is a stratovolcano, reaching 450 metres (1,480 feet) above sea level, located at the southeastern end of the NW-trending 250 km long Tabar-Lihir-Tanga-Feni (TLTF) volcanic island chain. It last erupted in about 350 BCE based on radiocarbon dating. The rock types sampled from Ambitle include feldspathoid-bearing basalt, trachybasalt, phonotephrite, trachyandesite, and trachydacite or quartz-trachyte. Its caldera, 3 kilometres (2 miles) wide, contains thermal areas on its western side. Venting of hydrothermal water also occurs in coral reefs to the west of this island. The vents located at Tutum Bay are unique in that the vent fluids and surrounding sediments contain some of the highest concentrations of arsenic in a natural system.

== History ==
In March 1643 the expedition to Oceania of Abel Tasman approached New Ireland. Tasman believed that he had already reached the mainland of New Guinea, while he was in fact sailing along the eastern coast of New Ireland. The expedition passed south of Ambitle, naming it St. Jan's Island. One of those on board the Zeehaen, one of the two ships on the voyage, drew coastline profiles of the island in Tasman's journal.
