= Lamoran =

- Village
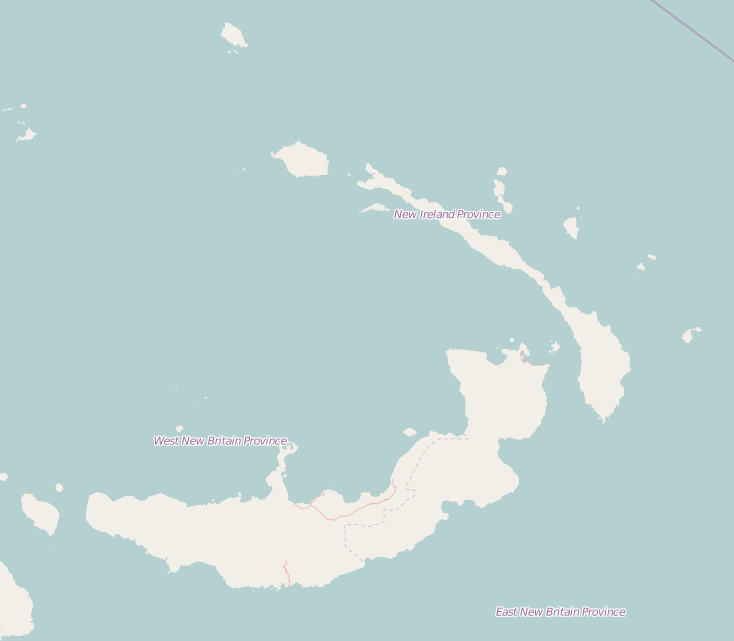
- Location
- Coordinates: 4°26′S 153°3′E
- Country: Papua New Guinea
- Province: New Ireland Province
- District: Namatanai District

Lamoran is a village on the south-eastern coast of New Ireland, Papua New Guinea. It is located in Konoagil Rural LLG.
