= Sumsuma =

Papua New Guinean unionist

Sumsuma (1903?–August 20, 1965) was one of the leaders of the Rabaul strike, the first industrial strike in Papua New Guinea.

Sumsuma was born in the village of Sasa on Boang Island sometime around 1903. He became a seaman at age 10 and by 1927 was the captain of a small trading schooner. His wage of £12 a month made him one of the higher-paid seamen, the average wage of a Papua New Guinean at the time being half that.

On January 2, 1929, Sumsuma organized a strike in Rabaul with the goal of increased wages for native workers. He was assisted by N'Dramei of Manus, the senior sergeant-major of the police. Both the employers and the local Catholic mission refused to negotiate, which, combined with the general inexperience of the strikers, caused the strike to quickly fizzle out by the afternoon of January 3. Sumsuma, along with N'Dramei and the other strike leaders were sentenced to three years in prison under harsh conditions.

After being released in 1932, Sumsuma helped establish multiple copra-marketing cooperatives, through which he gained a respected reputation. During World War II, he collaborated with Japan. When the war ended and the Japanese withdrew, the various luluais (village chiefs) of the Tanga Islands attempted to elect Sumsuma as king, but this was blocked by the returning Australian authorities.

Sumsuma had seven children from three marriages. He died on August 20, 1965 of asthma at the Catholic mission hospital on Boang Island.
