= Ephraim Apelis =

Papua New Guinean politician

Ephraim T. Apelis (26 December 1954 – 2003) from Warangansau village, in the Matalai Rural LLG of Namatanai District was a member of the National Parliament of Papua New Guinea representing the Namatanai Open Seat in New Ireland Province of Papua New Guinea from 1997-2002.

Ephraim Apelis was born on 26 December 1954. He obtained a B.Ed. degree from the University of Papua New Guinea (UPNG, 1973-1977), an M.Ed. from the University of Hawaii (1979-1981) and did post-graduate study at both Macquarie University, Australia (1983-1984) and UPNG (1987–88).

Apelis was a secondary school teacher in 1977-1978 and a teaching fellow at UPNG from 1978-1981. He continued at UPNG as a lecturer and senior lecturer. He did research in the Education Research Unit of UPNG from 1981 until 1987 and continued with that department when it transferred to the National Research Institute in 1988. He conducted work attachments and study at the Central Institute for Educational Research in Beijing in 1987, at the Centre for Educational Research and Innovational Development, Tribhuvan University, Nepal, (1986) and IOE, School of Education, University of the South Pacific, Fiji, in 1981.

Apelis was provincial secretary of the New Ireland Provincial government (1988-1992) and director of the Islands Regional Secretariat (1992-1996).

In the 1997 elections, Apelis came into parliament as a member of the National Alliance Party by defeating his cousin, the sitting prime minister for Papua New Guinea, Sir Julius Chan, for the Namatanai Open Seat by 110 votes. He was appointed Shadow Minister for Provincial Affairs and Local Level Governments. He polled 7969 votes to Chan's 7859 votes. He was unseated at the 2002 national elections by Byron Chan of People's Progress Party and died in 2003.

Apelis published at least 14 articles in books and journals, as well as ten reports and reviews.
