= Schnaubelt =

Schnaubelt is a surname. Notable people with the surname include:

- Alois Schnaubelt, a Knight's Cross of the Iron Cross recipient in 1944
- Franz Joseph (artist) (Franz Joseph Schnaubelt, 1914–1994), American artist and author associated with the 1960s American TV show Star Trek
- Rudolph Schnaubelt (1863–1901), suspected bomber in the 1886 Haymarket affair
- Walter Schnaubelt (born 1966), politician in Papua New Guinea
