= Maliom =

- Village
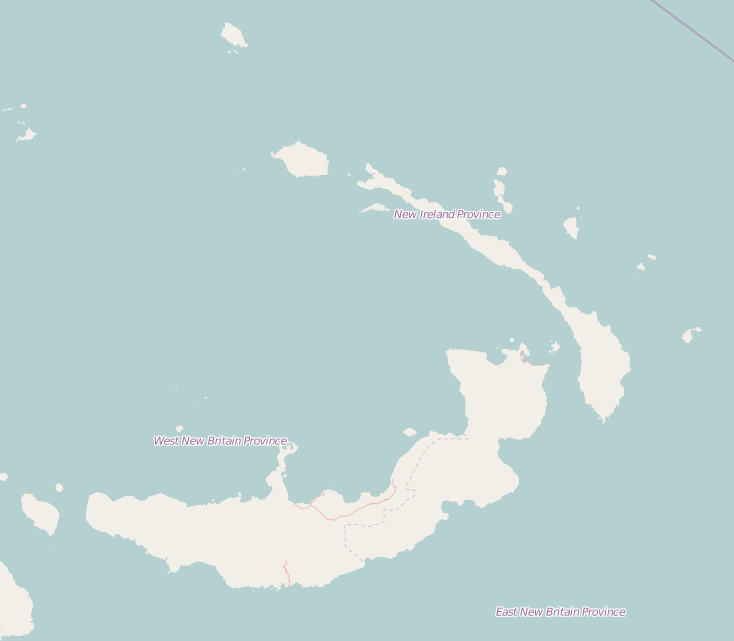
- Location
- Coordinates: 4°38′41″S 153°0′47″E
- Country: Papua New Guinea
- Province: New Ireland Province
- District: Namatanai District

Maliom is a village on the south-eastern coast of New Ireland, Papua New Guinea. The Aparam River flows into the sea to the north. It is located in Konoagil Rural LLG.
