= Byron Chan =

Papua New Guinean politician (born 1969)

James Byron Chan

Member of the National Parliament
- In office 2002–2017
- Preceded by: Ephraim Apelis
- Succeeded by: Walter Schnaubelt
- Constituency: Namatanai Open

Minister for Mining
- Prime Minister: Peter O'Neill

Personal details
- Born: June 13, 1969 (age 57)
- Party: People's Progress Party
- Relations: Sir Julius Chan (father)

James Byron Chan (born 13 June 1969) is a Papua New Guinean politician. He was a People's Progress Party member of the National Parliament of Papua New Guinea from 2002 until 2017, representing the electorate of Namatanai Open. The son of the late former Prime Minister of Papua New Guinea Julius Chan, he defeated the late Ephraim Apelis at the 2002 election, and was twice re-elected before being defeated by Walter Schnaubelt at the 2017 election. Prior to his defeat, he served as Minister for Mining in the government of Peter O'Neill.

On February 20, 2026, Chan was sworn in as governor of New Ireland Province following a provincial by-election and official recognition by the Department of Provincial and Local Level Government Affairs. He succeeded his father as the fifth governor of New Ireland.

== Political career ==
Chan entered politics in the 2002 general election, winning the Namatanai Open seat as a candidate for the People's Progress Party (PPP), defeating incumbent Ephraim Apelis. He was re-elected in the 2007 and 2012 elections.

In August 2011, following the formation of the O'Neill-Namah government, Chan was appointed Minister for Mining. He was reappointed in 2012 under the O'Neill-Dion cabinet. During his tenure, he oversaw the Mining Act and worked on initiatives like the online mining cadastre system, in which he addressed issues in projects such as Solwara 1 seabed mining.

Chan lost his seat in the 2017 general election to Walter Schnaubelt.

After leaving parliament, Chan served as a director on the board of Ok Tedi Mining Limited (OTML) from August 2018. He resigned in January 2022 to contest the 2022 general election for Namatanai Open but was again defeated by Walter Schnaubelt.

Following the death of his father, Sir Julius Chan (longtime Governor of New Ireland Province), in January 2025, major parties including Pangu Pati and PPP have endorsed Byron Chan as a candidate for the upcoming by-election for Governor of New Ireland Province.

National Parliament of Papua New Guinea
Preceded by Ephraim Apelis	Member for Namatanai Open; 2002–2017	Succeeded by Walter Schnaubelt
