= Rabaul Strike =

The Rabaul Strike of 1929 was the first ever industrial strike in Papua New Guinea.

The strike began on 2 January 1929 in the township of Rabaul, then the capital of the Territory of New Guinea. The goal of the strike was increased wages. The strike was led by Sumsuma, who was assisted by N'Dramei of Manus, the senior sergeant-major of the police. Around 3,000 workers participated in the strike, a majority of Rabaul's working population.

The strikers had originally planned for the local Catholic mission to mediate between them and the employers, but the mission refused. This, combined with the employers' refusal to negotiate at all and the general inexperience of the strikers, caused the strike to quickly fizzle out. By the afternoon of 3 January, most of the strikers had returned to work.

Sumsuma, along with N'Dramei and the other strike leaders were sentenced to 3 years in prison.

== Sources ==
- Gammage, Bill (1975). "The Rabaul strike, 1929". Journal of Pacific History. 10: 3–29. doi:10.1080/00223347508572276.
