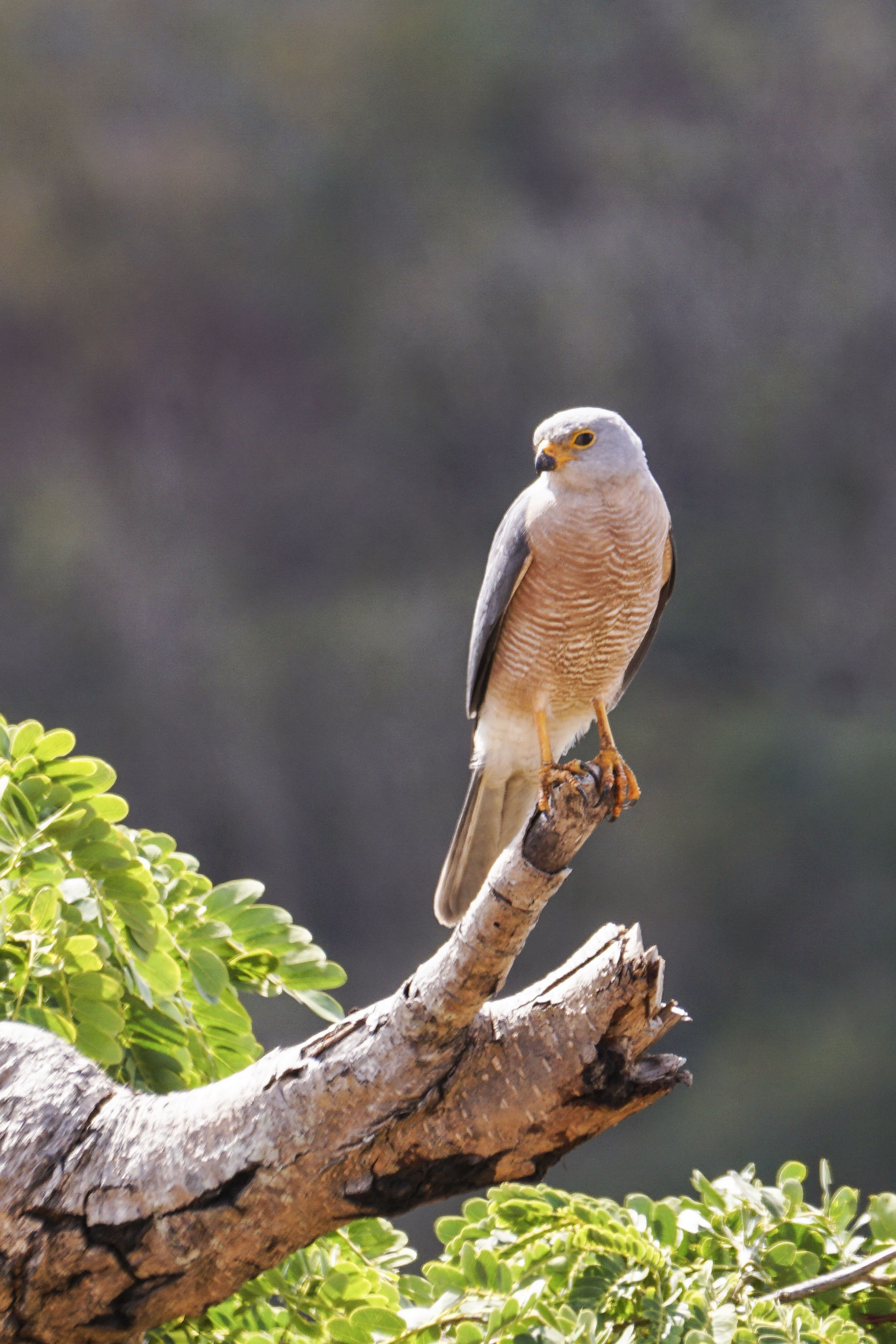

Conservation status
- Least Concern (IUCN 3.1)

Scientific classification
- Kingdom: Animalia
- Phylum: Chordata
- Class: Aves
- Order: Accipitriformes
- Family: Accipitridae
- Genus: Tachyspiza
- Species: T. hiogaster
- Subspecies: T. h. sylvestris

Trinomial name
- Tachyspiza hiogaster sylvestris (Wallace, 1864)

Synonyms
- Accipiter sylvestris; Accipiter hiogaster sylvestris

= Lesser Sundas goshawk =

Subspecies of bird

The Lesser Sundas goshawk (Tachyspiza hiogaster sylvestris) is a bird of prey native to Indonesia. It is sometimes elevated to species status, but the IOC lumps it together with the variable goshawk (T. hiogaster).
