= Lanisso Bay =

Bay of Papua New Guinea

Coordinates: 4°47′S 152°54′E

Lanisso Bay is a bay off the south-western corner of New Ireland, Papua New Guinea. It lies across the Cape St. George peninsula from Lambom Island. Lavinia Bay is a cove in Lanisso Bay, roughly 3 miles northward of Cape St. George.

The village of Matatai is located by the bay.
