= Lamassa Island =

Island in Papua New Guinea

Coordinates: 4°42′S 152°46′E

Lamassa Island is an island in Lamassa Bay off the village of Lamassa off the south-western coast of New Ireland, Papua New Guinea. It contains Lamassa Airport and a village on the north coast.
