= Babase Island =

Volcanic island in Papua New Guinea

Babase
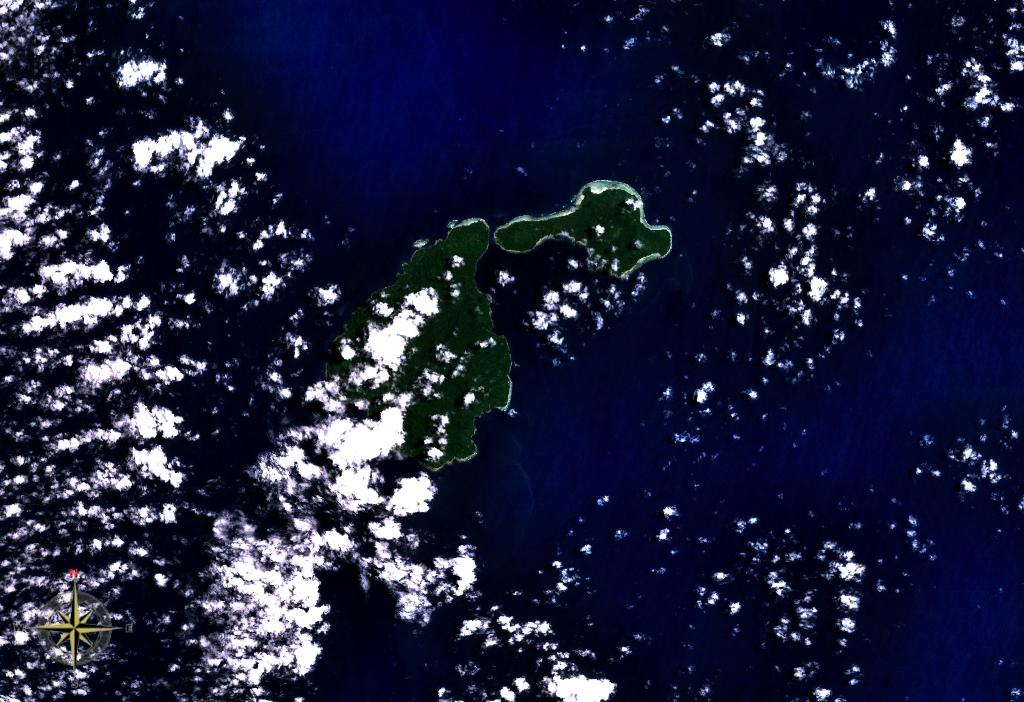
- Feni Islands seen from space, with Ambitle (left) and Babase (right).

Highest point
- Elevation: 200 m (660 ft)
- Prominence: 200 m (660 ft)
- Coordinates: 4°2′S 153°43′E

Geography
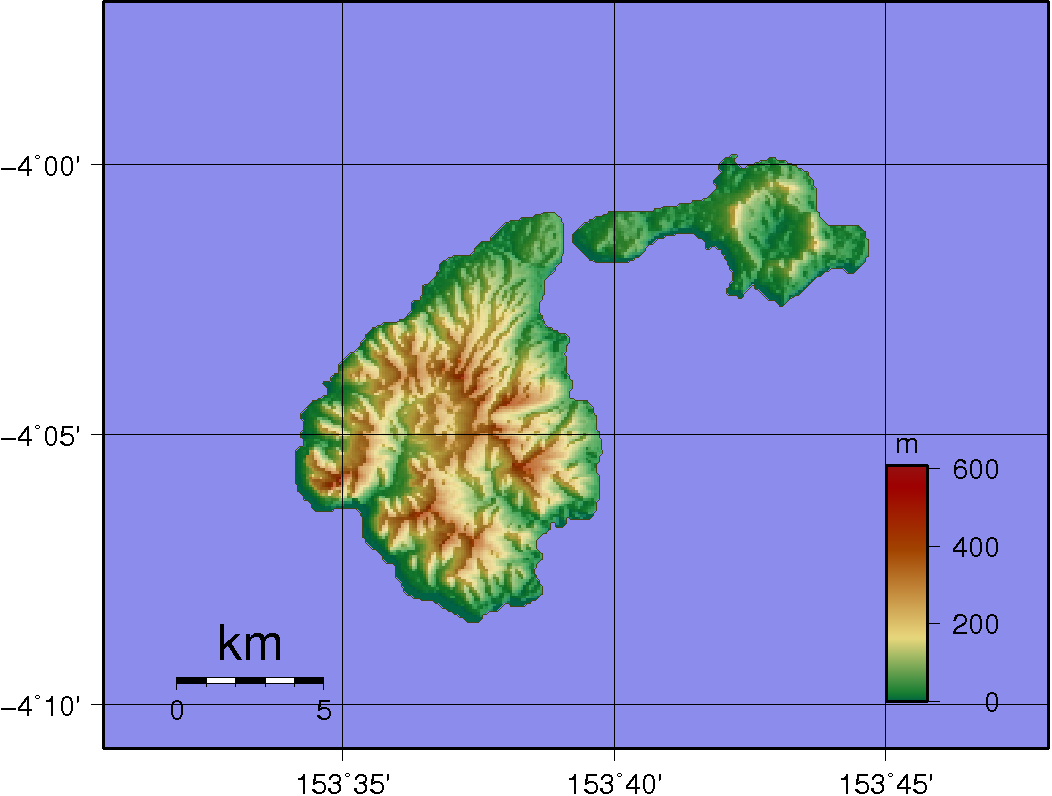
- Topographic map of Feni Islands. Babase is on the right.
- Location: Bismarck Archipelago, Papua New Guinea

Geology
- Mountain type: Stratovolcano
- Last eruption: Unknown

Babase Island is an island of the Feni Islands in Papua New Guinea, located east of New Ireland. It consists of a stratovolcano and a lava dome, joined by an isthmus.
