= Lamassa =

- Village
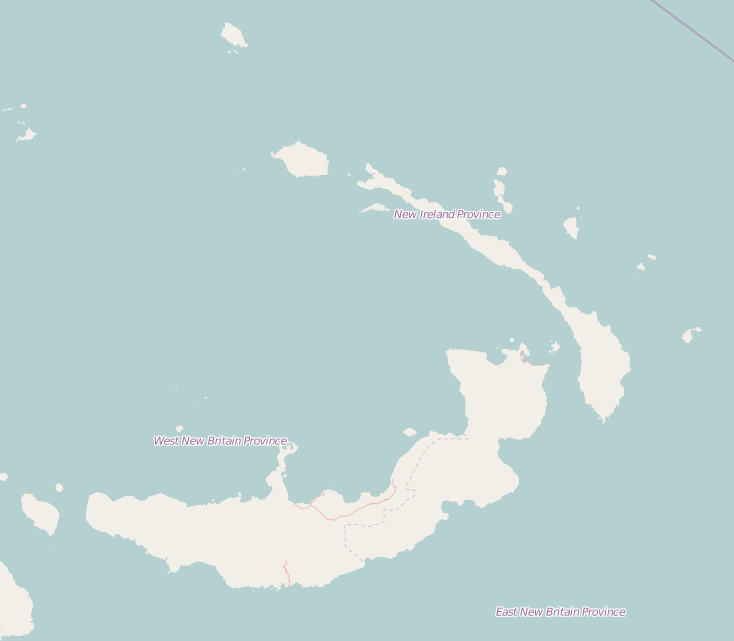
- Location
- Coordinates: 4°41′S 152°46′E
- Country: Papua New Guinea
- Province: New Ireland Province
- District: Namatanai District

Lamassa is a village on the south-west coast of New Ireland, Papua New Guinea, south of Kabaman. Lamassa Island lies off the coast to the south in the bay of the same name. It is located in Konoagil Rural LLG.
