= Lihir language =

Oceanic language spoken in Papua New Guinea

Lihir
- Lir
- Region: Lihir Island, off New Ireland
- Native speakers: (13,000 cited 2000 census)
- Language family: Austronesian: Malayo-Polynesian; Oceanic; Western; Meso-Melanesian; (New Ireland); Tabar; Lihir

Language codes
- ISO 639-3: lih
- Glottolog: lihi1237

The Lihir language (Lir) is an Austronesian language spoken in the Lihir island group, in New Ireland Province, Papua New Guinea. It is notable for having five levels of grammatical number: singular, dual, trial, paucal and plural. It is questionable whether the trial is indeed trial or whether it is paucal, leaving there being a paucal and a greater paucal. Either way, this is the highest number of levels of grammatical number in any language. This distinction appears in both independent pronouns and possessor suffixes. There is some variation in pronunciation and orthography between the main island Niolam, and some of the smaller islands in the group.

== Name ==
The name Lihir is an exonym from the related Patpatar language. Natively, it is called Lir, a cognate of the Patpatar name.

== Phonology ==
Sources are indeterminate with regards to the phonemic status of different surface vowels, although minimal pairs provide evidence for the phonemic status of most vowel qualities.

Vowel Phonemes of Lihir
	Front	Central	Back
Close	i		u
Close-mid	e		o
Open-mid	ɛ		ɔ
Open		a	

Consonant Phonemes of Lihir
		Labial	Alveolar	Velar	Glottal
Nasals		m	n	ŋ	
Stops	plain	p	t	k	ʔ
Stops	prenasalized	ᵐb	ⁿd	ᵑɡ	
Affricates			t͡s		
Fricatives			s z	x	h
Liquids			l ɾ		
Semivowels		w		j	
