= Lambom Island =

Island off New Ireland, Bismarck Archipelago

Coordinates: 4°48′S 152°51′E

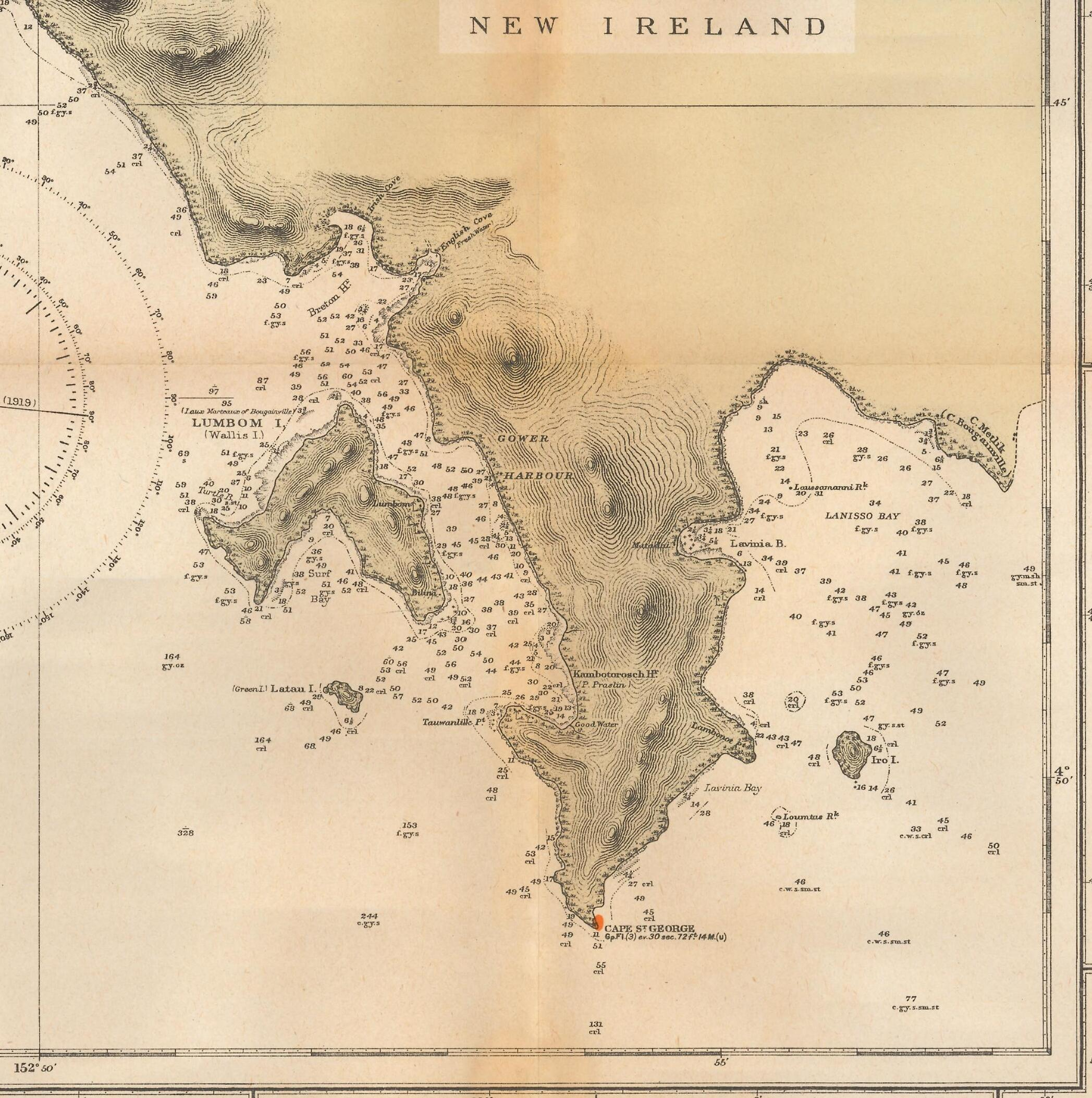
Lambom (Lumbom) Island and Cape St George from a 1909 nautical chart

Lambom Island or Lambon or Lumbom, also known as Wallis Island, and Île aux Marteaux, is an island off the south-western corner of New Ireland, Papua New Guinea, off Lambom. On the other side of the Cape St. George peninsula is Lanisso Bay.

The island was visited by Philip Carteret in June 1767, on his round-the-world voyage in Swallow. He named it Wallis Island, after Samuel Wallis. Wallis had set out with him in Dolphin, but the two ships were separated in a storm after passing through the Strait of Magellan.

In July the following year the expedition of Louis Antoine de Bougainville arrived. He named the island Île aux Marteaux, "Hammer Island" after a species of Malleus, the hammer shell or hammer oyster found there, which was not often found in European collections.
