= Aparam River =

River in Papua New Guinea

Coordinates: 4°37′4″S 153°1′31″E

- Location of mouth

Location
- Country: Papua New Guinea
- Island: New Ireland

The Aparam is a river of south-eastern New Ireland. It flows into the sea to the north of Maliom.
