= Lihir Island =

Island in Papua New Guinea

Lihir
Native name: Niolam
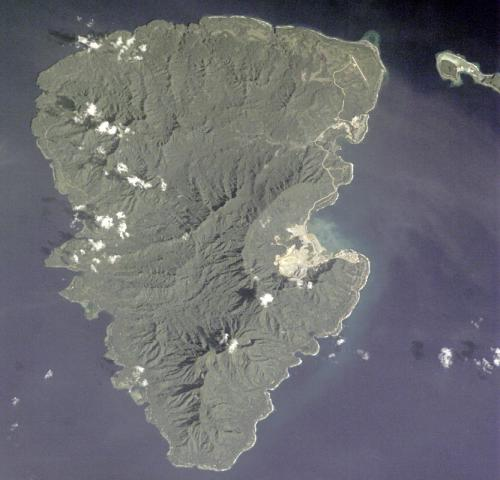
- NASA Space Shuttle image of Lihir Island

- Location within Papua New Guinea

Geography
- Location: Melanesia
- Coordinates: 3°7′30″S 152°38′30″E
- Archipelago: Bismarck Archipelago
- Total islands: 4
- Major islands: 1
- Length: 22 km (13.7 mi)
- Width: 14.6 km (9.07 mi)
- Highest elevation: 700 m (2300 ft)

Administration
- Papua New Guinea
- Province: New Ireland Province
- District: Namatanai District
- LLG: Nimamar Rural LLG

Demographics
- Population: 25,608

Lihir Island (a.k.a. Niolam Island) is the largest island in the Lihir group of islands, 22 km (14 mi) long and 14.5 km (9.0 mi) wide, in Papua New Guinea's New Ireland Province. It consists of a complex of several overlapping basaltic stratovolcanoes rising 700 m (2,300 ft) above sea level. While the volcanoes are not currently active, geothermal activity is still present. The island is in what was the forearc basin associated with the subduction of the Pacific Plate beneath the North Bismarck Plate. Subduction stopped about 10 million years ago with the collision of the Ontong Java Plateau with the subduction zone.

The name Lihir comes from the Patpatar language, cognate of the native name Lir. Niolam, also spelled Nualam or Nuolam, means "big island" (nua "island" + lam "big").

The island is located 900 km (560 mi) north east of Port Moresby. Annual rainfall averages 4,800 mm (190 in); temperature ranges between 19 and 35 °C (66 and 95 °F). The population of the Lihir Group increased from 12,570 in 2000 to an estimated 25,608 in 2011. Residents are of Melanesian descent and have predominantly a subsistence lifestyle.

Lihirians follow traditional belief systems, although official census records indicate that 99% of the PNG population are Christians, with Catholicism being the largest denomination. Most villages are located on the coastal fringe, although it is thought that originally some villages were located inland but were moved to the coast at the encouragement of missionaries.

The economic focal point of the island is the Lihir Gold Mine. Lihir represents one of the largest epithermal gold deposits in the world and it is hosted by high-potassic igneous rocks. The mine is operated by Newmont. The mine holds one of the world's largest gold resources (46 million ounces (1.3 billion grams)). Grab samples from the submarine Conical Seamount, located about 8 km (5.0 mi) south of Lihir Island, contain high gold concentrations of up to 250 g/t (9.0 oz/long ton) Au (avg. 26 g/t (0.93 oz/long ton), n=40) that are hosted by high-potassic trachybasalts.

The mine is located on a geothermically active area and to enable the mine to proceed, steam relief wells have been drilled to release subterranean pressure. The steam has, in part, been captured and is used to operate a 50 MW geothermal power station which generates approximately 25% of the mine's power requirements. Mine tailings are discharged into the sea.

The largest settlement on the Island is Londolovit, where most of the expatriate mine employees live. Basic shopping and health care facilities are located there. The local hospital has inpatient and outpatient facilities and provides health care services to both the expatriate and local communities.

An airstrip large enough to land a small jet is also located north of Londolovit, at Kunaye village, Lihir Island Airport.

As is the case in many tropical regions, mosquito-borne viruses are present on the island, as is malaria.

Land ownership follows traditional models with land being owned by clans. Insofar as it relates to land ownership, the society is matrilineal with land being passed through the female generations. The land cannot be sold; however, usage rights can be granted.

The Island has two large Primary Schools and a Secondary School Located on the Mining impacted area. The largest of the two Primary schools is Sekunkun Primary School which is on the North Eastern part of the Island. The school has total of over 600 students and 19 teachers.

== See also ==
- List of volcanoes in Papua New Guinea
