= Tefa Island =

Island in New Ireland Province, Papua New Guinea

Coordinates: 3°32′S 153°12′E

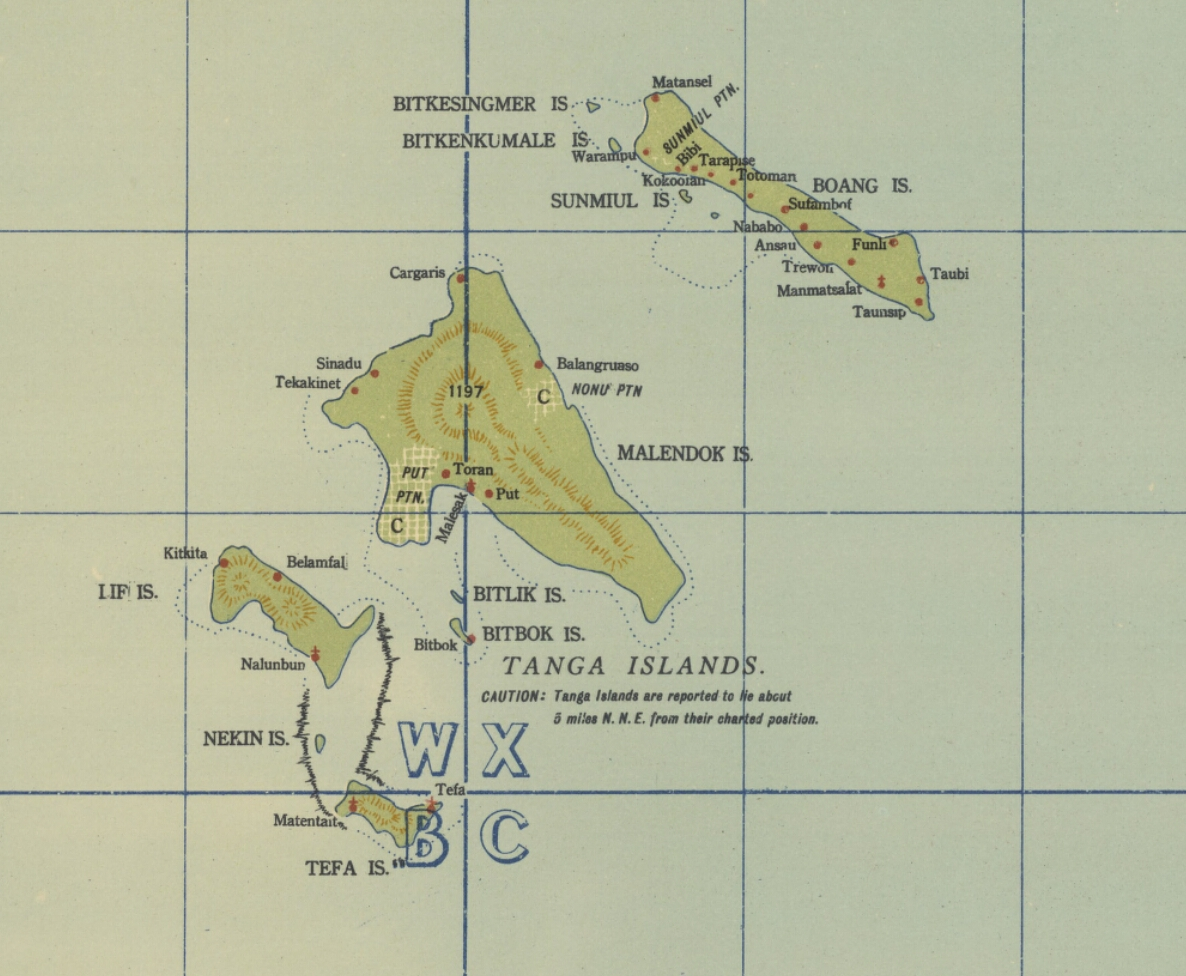
Map of the Tanga Islands

Tefa Island is a small island of the Tanga Islands of Papua New Guinea, located to the east of New Ireland. It is located to the south of Malendok Island and south of Lif Island. The main settlement is Tefa.
