= Kait, Papua New Guinea =

Kait
- Village
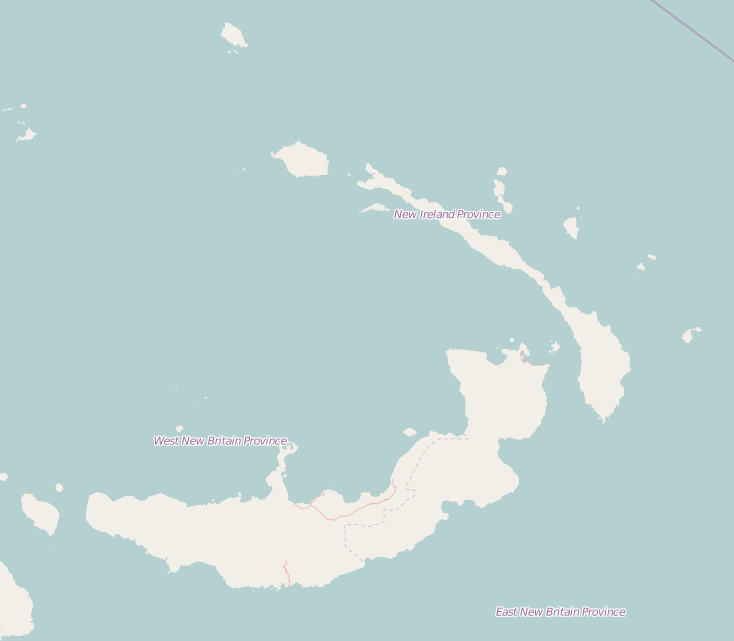
- Location
- Coordinates: 4°27′S 152°39′E
- Country: Papua New Guinea
- Province: New Ireland Province
- District: Namatanai District

Kait is a village on the south-west coast of New Ireland, Papua New Guinea. It is located in Konoagil Rural LLG. Two notable rivers flow into the Bismarck Sea here.

The villagers speak the Kandas language.
