= Malendok Island =

Island of the Tanga Islands, Papua New Guinea

Coordinates: 3°28′S 153°13′E

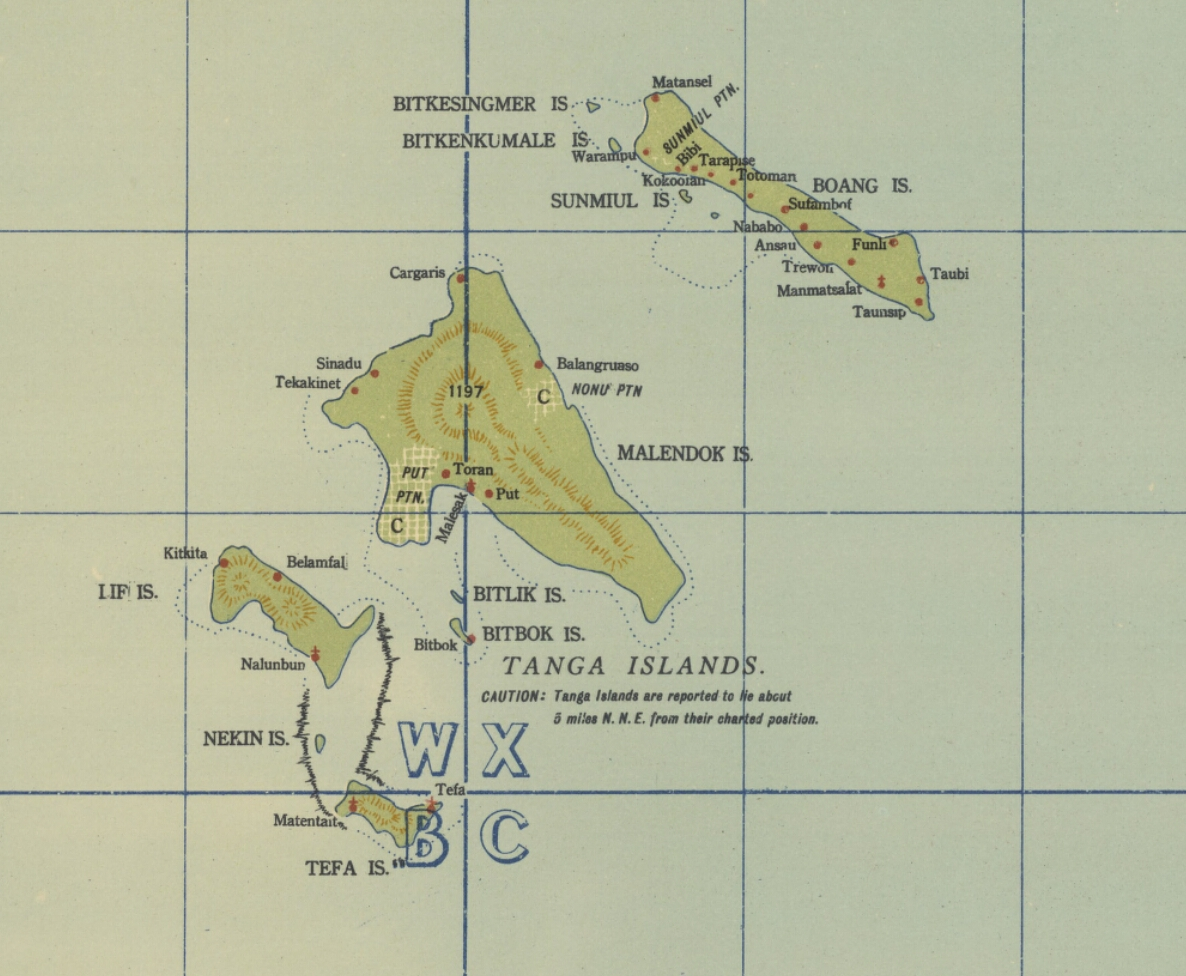
Map of the Tanga Islands

Malendok Island is an island of the Tanga Islands of Papua New Guinea, located to the east of New Ireland. It is located to the south-west of Boang Island and north-east of Lif Island and Tefa Island. It covers 35 square kilometres (13.5 sq mi). Most inhabitants live in small hamlets on the coast. On the south-western side is a coconut plantation.
