= Lif Island =

Island of Papua New Guinea

Coordinates: 3°30′S 153°11′E

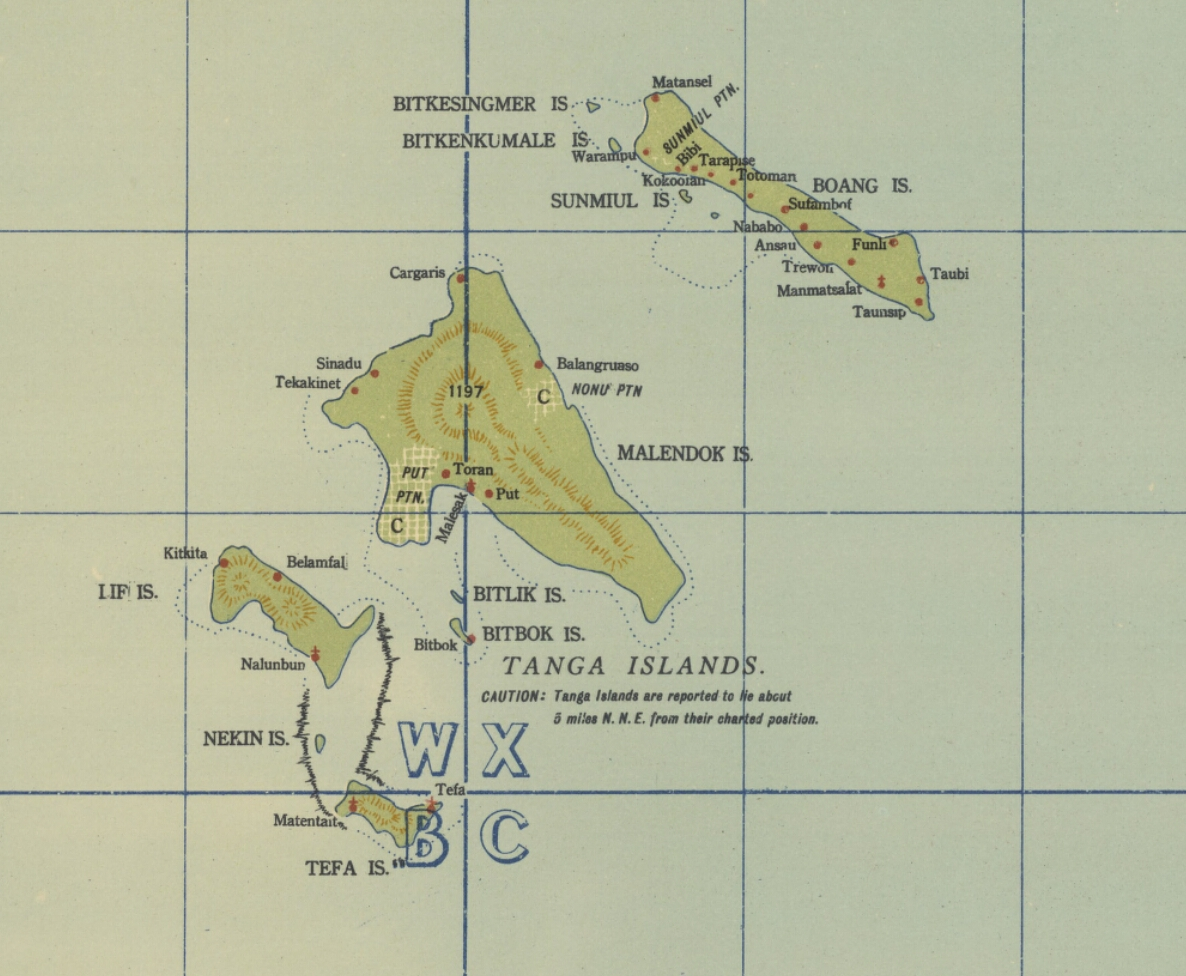
Map of the Tanga Islands

Lif Island is a small island of the Tanga Islands of Papua New Guinea, located to the east of New Ireland. It is located to the south-west of Malendok Island and north of Tefa Island. The main settlements are Balamfal and Kitkita.
