= Walter Schnaubelt =

Papua New Guinean politician

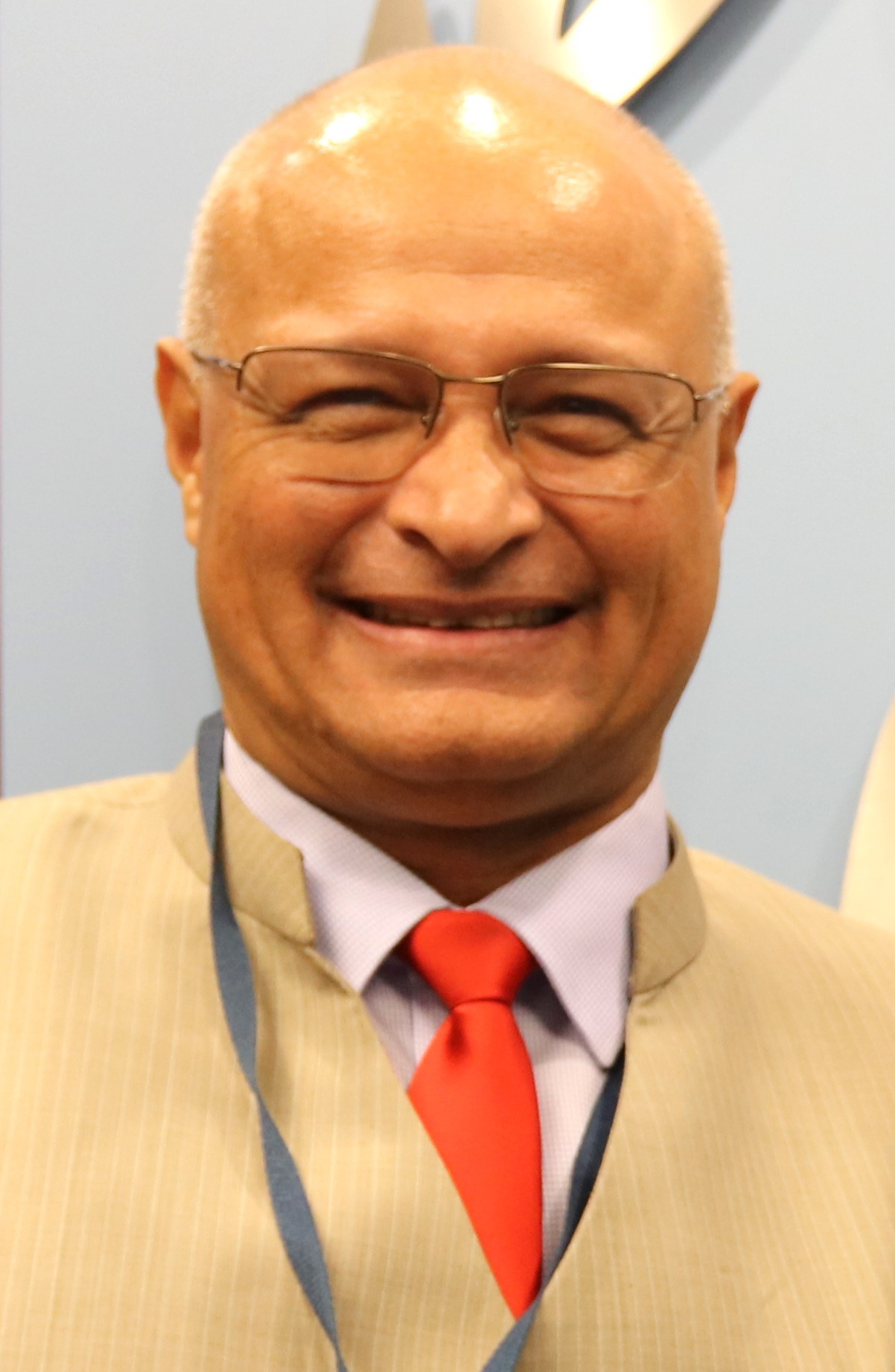
Walter Schnaubelt in 2023

Walter David Schnaubelt (born 4 October 1966) of New Ireland, Chinese and Austrian parentage is the Member of Parliament for the Namatanai Open Electorate in the New Ireland Province of Papua New Guinea. He is a member and current National President of the National Alliance Party. He defeated his first cousin Byron Chan by a landslide victory collecting 20,479 votes to Byron's 12,804 to claim the Namatanai Open Seat. He won gold in Karate at the Pacific Games in 1999 in Guam. Join the coalition government led by James Marape and Steven Davis in August 2019.

Schnaubelt is a nephew of former prime minister Julius Chan.
