= Konoagil Rural LLG =

Local-level government in Papua New Guinea

Coordinates: 4.6°S 152.9°E

- Location of Konoagil Rural LLG in Namatanai District of New Ireland Province in Papua New Guinea

- Location within Papua New Guinea
- Country: Papua New Guinea
- Province: New Ireland Province

Area
  - Total: 3,127.2 km^{2} (1,207.4 sq mi)

Population (2011 census)
  - Total: 13,132
  - Density: 4.1993/km^{2} (10.876/sq mi)
- Time zone: UTC+10 (AEST)

District map of New Ireland Province

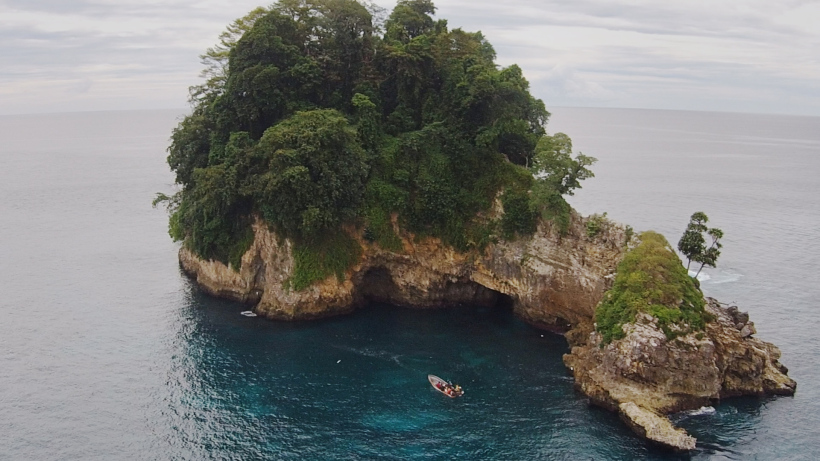
Tawau

Konoagil Rural LLG is a local government area in New Ireland Province, Papua New Guinea. The LLG administers the southern peninsula of the island of New Ireland. The LLG is located in Namatanai District and its population is 13,132 (Census 2011). Languages in the area include Siar-Lak and Label.

The LLG is bordered by the Namatanai Rural LLG in the west coast and the new Matalai Rural LLG in the east coast.

The current LLG president is Hon. James Pandi MPA.

The Konoagil LLG is one of the LLGs of Namatanai District of New Ireland situated at the Southern tip of the island of New Ireland Province.

The LLG has name the eastern part as the LAK and the western part as the KADAS, these are two different areas in the LLG, the eastern part then called East Coast Konoagil (LAK) and the western became known as the West Coast Konoagil (KADAS). It is one of the LLGs in the Province that contributes more economically into the Economy of the province through abundant resources such as agriculture, fishing, hunting, coco and copra, multiple logging companies are currently logging the trees.

== Wards ==
- 01. Kamiang, Mimias, Lenai
- 02. Morkon (including the village of Lamoran)
- 03. Kamparam, Kamilal, Malum Ngis
- 04. Bakum, Silur Station
- 05. Pukunmal, Siar (including the village of Maliom)
- 06. Vudam Matkamlagir
- 07. Beriota, Malumpirau
- 08. Bakok, Maiatlik
- 09. Lambom
- 10. Lamassa
- 11. Kabaman
- 12. Kait (including the village of King)
- 13. Watpi
- 14. Tambakar
- 15. Siaman
