= Boang Island =

Island in Papua New Guinea

Coordinates: 3°23′S 153°18′E

Boang Island is an island of the Tanga Islands of Papua New Guinea, located to the east of New Ireland. It is located to the north-east of Malendok Island, and although smaller it is more populous and considered the socio-economic hub of the islands.
