= Tangga language =

Oceanic language of New Ireland

Tangga
- Region: New Ireland
- Native speakers: 11,000 estimated (2011 census)
- Language family: Austronesian: Malayo-Polynesian; Oceanic; Western; Meso-Melanesian; (St George linkage); Tangga

Language codes
- ISO 639-3: Either: bjp – Fanamaket (New Ireland) hrw – Warwar Feni (Feni Island)
- Glottolog: tang1348

Tangga is an Oceanic language of New Ireland, spoken on Tanga and Feni islands and in Sena, Muliama and Varangansau villages in the Tanglamet area of Namatanai of New Ireland itself. These three locations are highly divergent; children from one understand little to nothing of the others, and adults consider them to be distinct languages, though they recognize their common history of their migration from Tanga and Feni to New Ireland.
