= Kandas language =

Oceanic language

Kandas
- Native to: Papua New Guinea
- Region: New Ireland
- Ethnicity: 1,500 (2010)
- Native speakers: 1,400 (2010)
- Language family: Austronesian: Malayo-Polynesian; Oceanic; Western; Meso-Melanesian; (St George linkage); Kandas–Ramoaaina; Kandas

Language codes
- ISO 639-3: kqw
- Glottolog: kand1301
- ELP: Kandas
- Kandas is classified as Vulnerable by the UNESCO Atlas of the World's Languages in Danger.

Kandas is an Oceanic language spoken on New Ireland in Papua New Guinea.
