= Tanga Islands =

Archipelago in Papua New Guinea

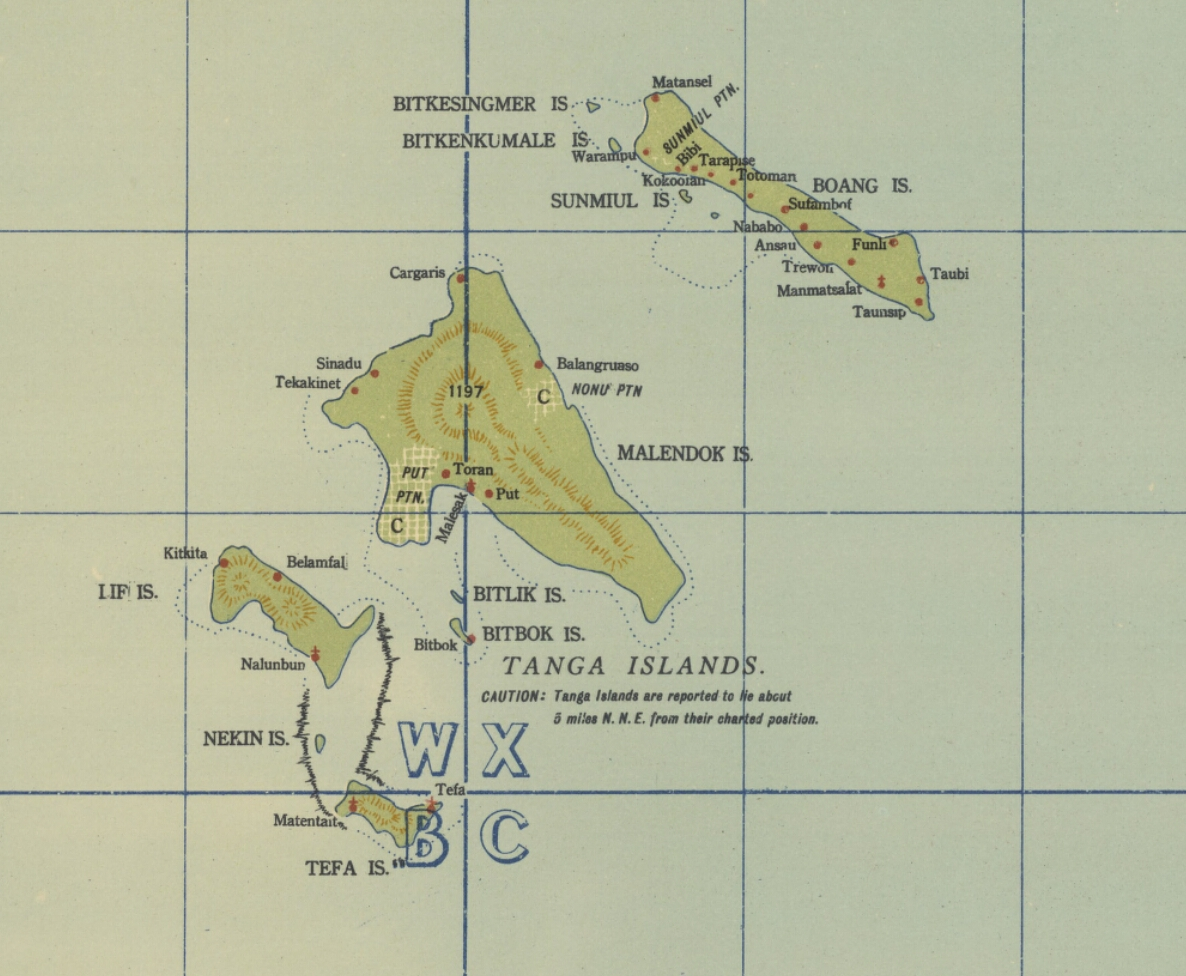

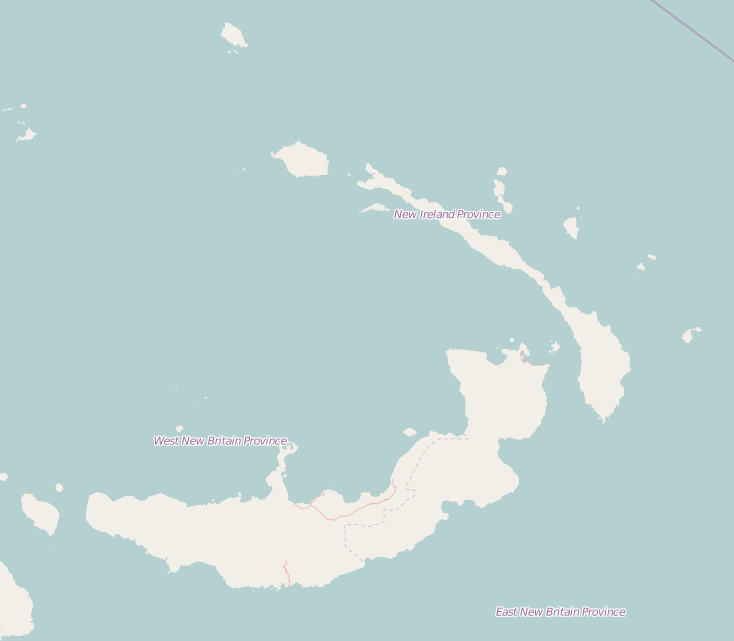
- Location within New Britain Location within Papua New Guinea

Geography
- Location: Oceania
- Archipelago: Bismarck Archipelago
- Major islands: Boang Island, Malendok Island, Lif Island, Tefa Island

Administration
- Papua New Guinea
- Province: New Ireland Province
- District: Namatanai District
- LLG: Tanir Rural LLG

Demographics
- Ethnic groups: Tanga people

Tanga Islands
- Location within Papua New Guinea

Highest point
- Prominence: 472 m (1,549 ft)
- Coordinates: 3°30′S 153°13′E

Geography
- Location: Papua New Guinea

Geology
- Mountain type: Stratovolcano with caldera
- Last eruption: Pleistocene

The Tanga Islands are an island group in Papua New Guinea, located north-east of New Ireland and part of the Bismarck Archipelago. Tanga is made up of four main islands — Boang, Malendok, Lif and Tefa — and a number of smaller, uninhabited islands. Boang (ca. 27 km^{2}) consists entirely of a raised, relatively flat-topped plateau of Pleistocene, coralline limestone, which rises up to 170 m above sea level (asl.) and has sheer cliffs around a large part of its perimeter. The islands are the remnants of a stratovolcano which collapsed to form a caldera. Lif (283 m), Tefa (155 m), and Malendok (472 m) islands are on the caldera rim, while Bitlik and Bitbok islands are lava domes constructed near the center of the caldera.

They are inhabited by the Tanga people. Former Prime Minister of Papua New Guinea Sir Julius Chan and Sumsuma, the leader of the Rabaul Strike of 1929 and Papua New Guinea's First Unionist are from the Tanga Islands.

Secret Societies practiced on the Islands are Sokapana, Tubuan and Ingiet. Mask dances include Lor, Tedak and Kipong are performed during cultural occasions.
