= Matalai Rural LLG =

Local-level government in Papua New Guinea

- District map of New Ireland Province
- Country: Papua New Guinea
- Province: New Ireland Province
- Time zone: UTC+10 (AEST)

Matalai Rural LLG was created from Wards 15–21 in the Namatanai LLG in Namatanai district of New Ireland Province. Matalai Rural LLG currently has 11 Wards altogether. There are:

Ward 1 Rativis - Kudukudu

Ward 2 Hibaling - Balai

Ward 3 Hilolon - Poronbus

Ward 4 Himau - Tekedan

Ward 5 Nokon - Himaul

Ward 6 Huris - Porpop - Likas

Ward 7 Hipakat - Samo

Ward 8 Kapsel - Kebeng

Ward 9 Ruka - Kabirara - Porbunbun

Ward 10 Sena - Pulpulu

Ward 11 Muliama - Warangansau

. It is located in the South East Coast of New Ireland Province. It has a population of 12,393 as of the 2011 PNG National Census. The current LLG President is Augustine Topi. Languages spoken here are Sursurunga language, Tanglamet

- Sursurunga at Ethnologue (18th ed., 2015)
