= Feni Islands =

Island group in Papua New Guinea

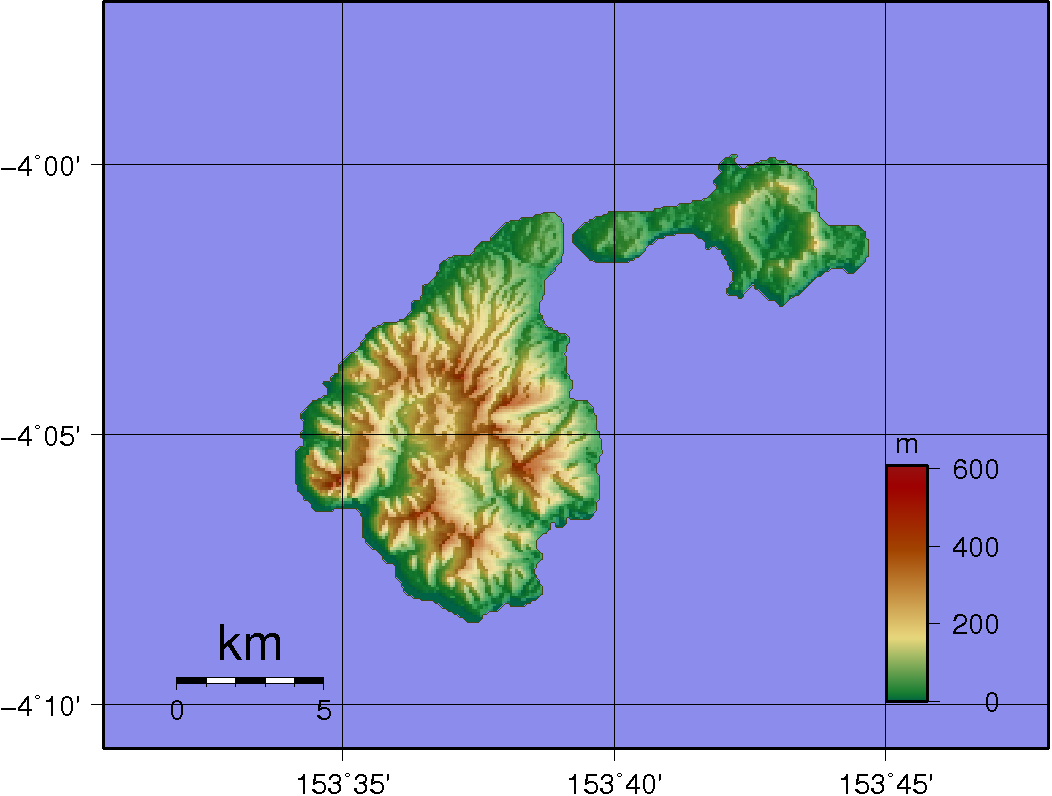
Topographic map of Feni Islands

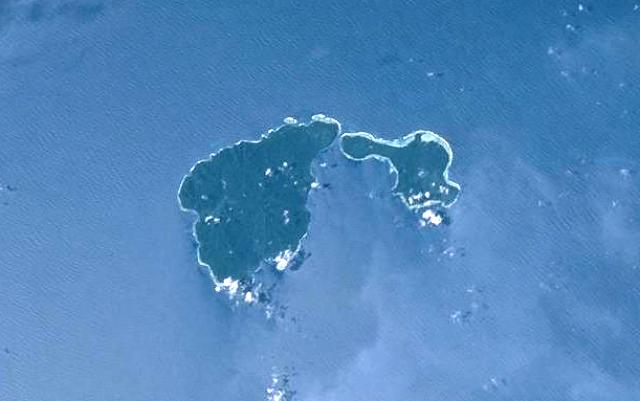
Feni Islands seen from space. Ambitle (larger) and Babase (smaller).

The Feni Islands are an island group in New Ireland Province, Papua New Guinea, located east of New Ireland, at 4°4′20.35″S 153°37′57.03″E. It is a part of the Bismarck Archipelago. The larger island of the group is Ambitle, the other island is Babase Island.

The Dutch were the first Europeans to see the Feni Islands, also known as Anir Islands, and initially named them 'St John's Island'. The name has appeared as St. Johan's I. and S. Ians Eylant on maps from the mid-1600s to 1700s.
