= Lihir Group =

Island group in Papua New Guinea

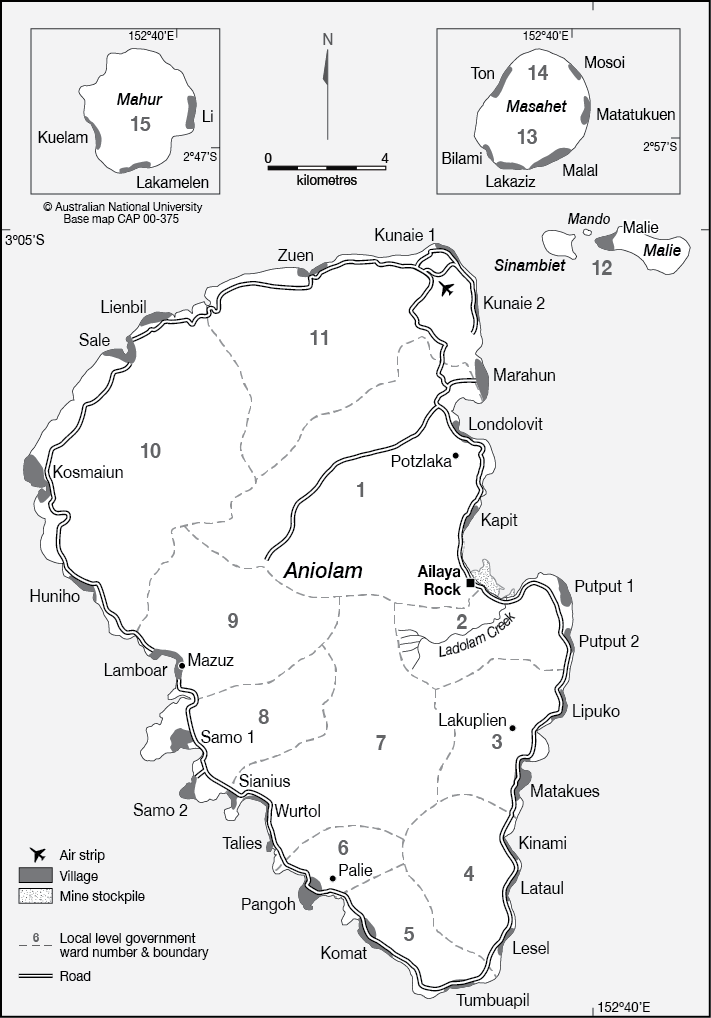
Map of the Lihir Group

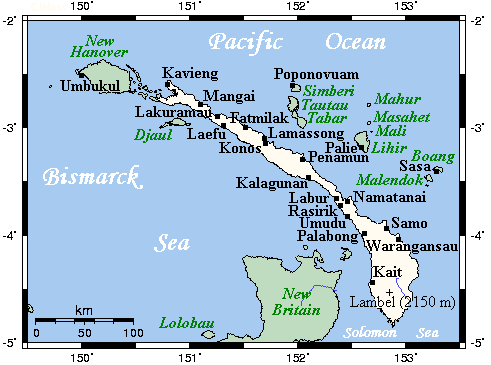
Lihir Group is to the north of New Ireland

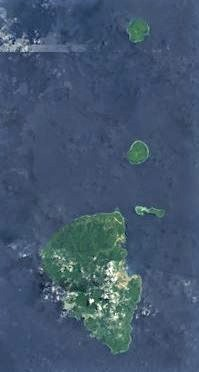
From north to south, the islands are Mahur, Masahet and Lihir, Sanambiet and Mali are off the west coast of Lihir

Lihir Group is an island group in New Ireland Province, Papua New Guinea, located north of New Ireland, at 3°S 152.583333°E. It is a part of Bismarck Archipelago. Largest island of the group is Lihir (a.k.a. Niolam), other islands include: Mali, Mahur, Masahet and Sanambiet.
