= Namatanai District =

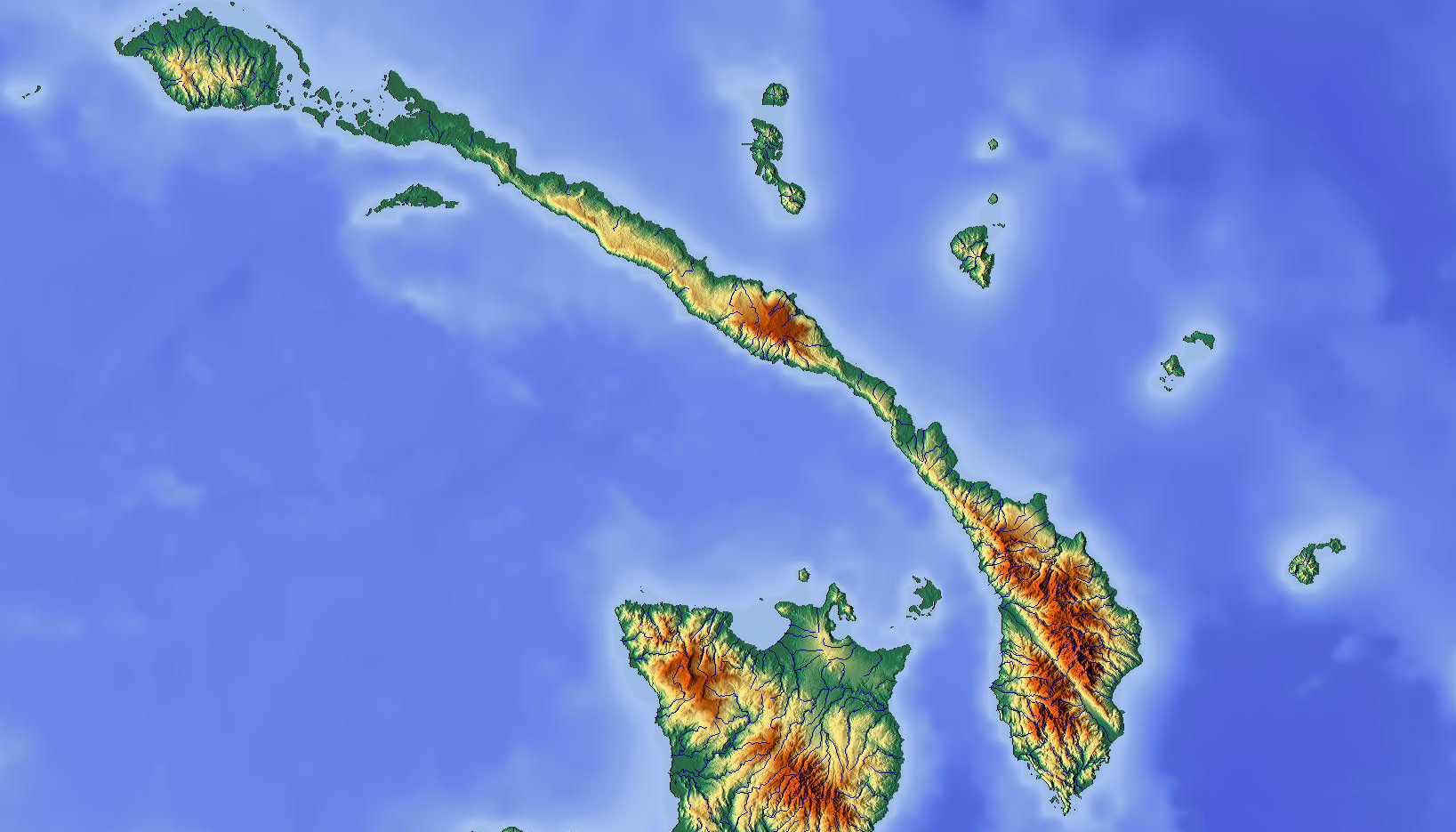
- Location within Papua New Guinea
- Coordinates: 3°40′5″S 152°24′18″E
- Country: Papua New Guinea
- Province: New Ireland Province
- Capital: Namatanai
- LLGs: List: Namatanai (R); Sentral Niu Ailan (R); Konoagil Rural LLG (R); Nimamar Rural LLG (R); Tanir Rural LLG (R); Matalai Rural LLG(R)

Government
  - MP: Walter Schnaubelt

Area
  - Total: 6,574 km^{2} (2,538 sq mi)

Population (2011 census)
  - Total: 110,905
  - Density: 16.87/km^{2} (43.69/sq mi)
- Time zone: UTC+10 (AEST)

Namatanai District is the southernmost and larger of the two districts of New Ireland Province in Papua New Guinea. The district covers the southern part of the island of New Ireland, as well as the Tabar Group, the Lihir Group, the Tanga Islands and the Feni Islands.

It is the 12th most populated District in Papua New Guinea and is recommended to be split into two districts by 2022. Sentral Niu Ailan Rural LLG will become an Electorate of its own.

Former Prime Minister of Papua New Guinea Sir Julius Chan represented the Namatanai Open Seat from 1968 to 1997. He was succeeded by his son, Byron Chan who was Member of Parliament until 2017. He was succeeded by the current Member of Parliament, Hon. Walter Schnaubelt.

The district headquarters is Namatanai and the district has six LLG areas, Namatanai Rural LLG, Sentral Niu Ailan Rural LLG, Konoagil Rural LLG, Nimamar Rural LLG, Matalai Rural LLG and Tanir Rural LLG.
