= Domesticated plants and animals of Austronesia =

Ancient expansion of agriculture

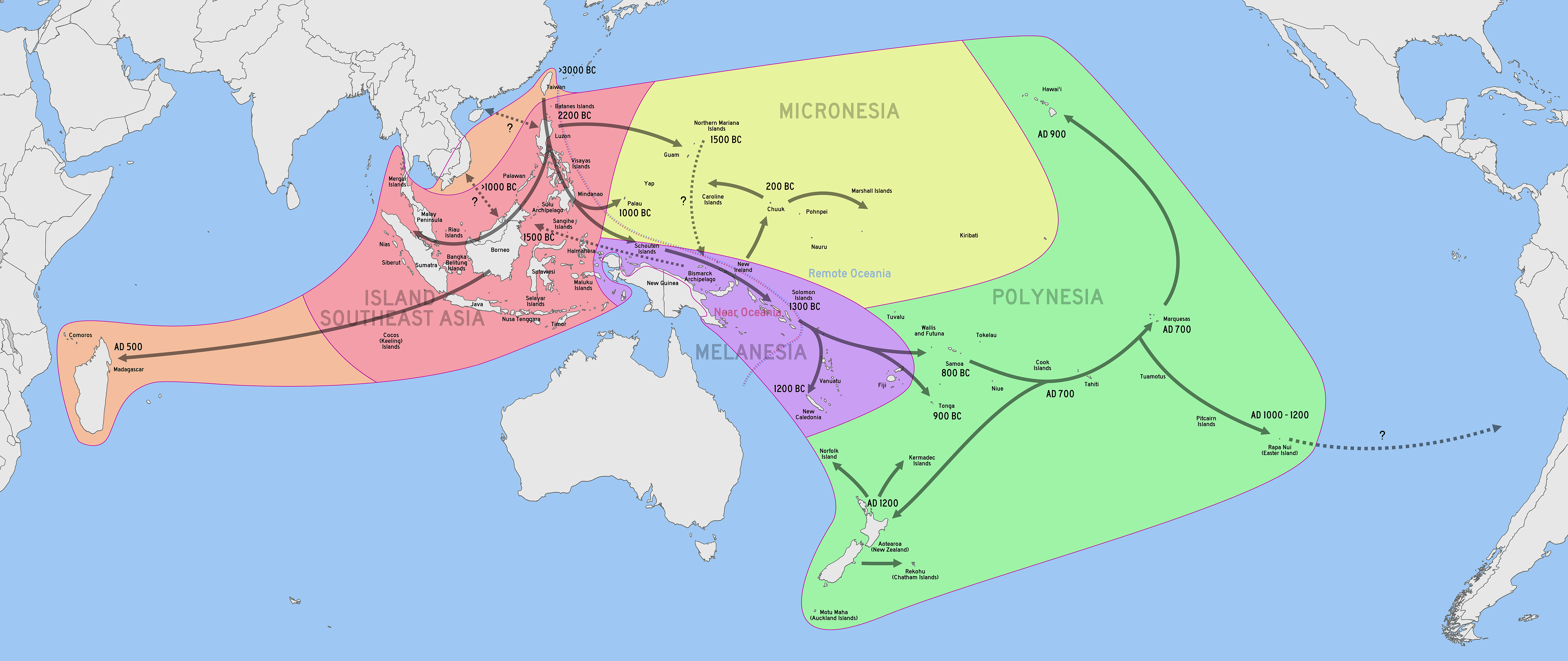
Chronological dispersal of Austronesian peoples across the Indo-Pacific

One of the major early human migrations was the maritime Austronesian expansion into the islands of the Indo-Pacific, believed to have begun between at least 5500 and 4000 BP (3500 to 2000 BCE). These migrations were accompanied by a set of domesticated, semi-domesticated, and commensal plants and animals transported via outrigger ships and catamarans that enabled the early Austronesian peoples to thrive in the islands of Maritime Southeast Asia, Near Oceania and Remote Oceania, Madagascar, and the Comoro Islands.

They include crops and animals believed to have originated from the Hemudu and Majiabang cultures in the theorized pre-Austronesian homelands in China, as well as other plants and animals believed to have been first domesticated from within Taiwan, maritime Southeast Asia, and New Guinea. These plants are often referred to as "canoe plants", especially in the context of the migrations of the Polynesians. Domesticated animals and plants introduced during historic times are not included.

== Plants ==
Domesticated, semi-domesticated, and commensal plants carried by Austronesian voyagers include the following:

=== Aleurites moluccanus (candlenut) ===
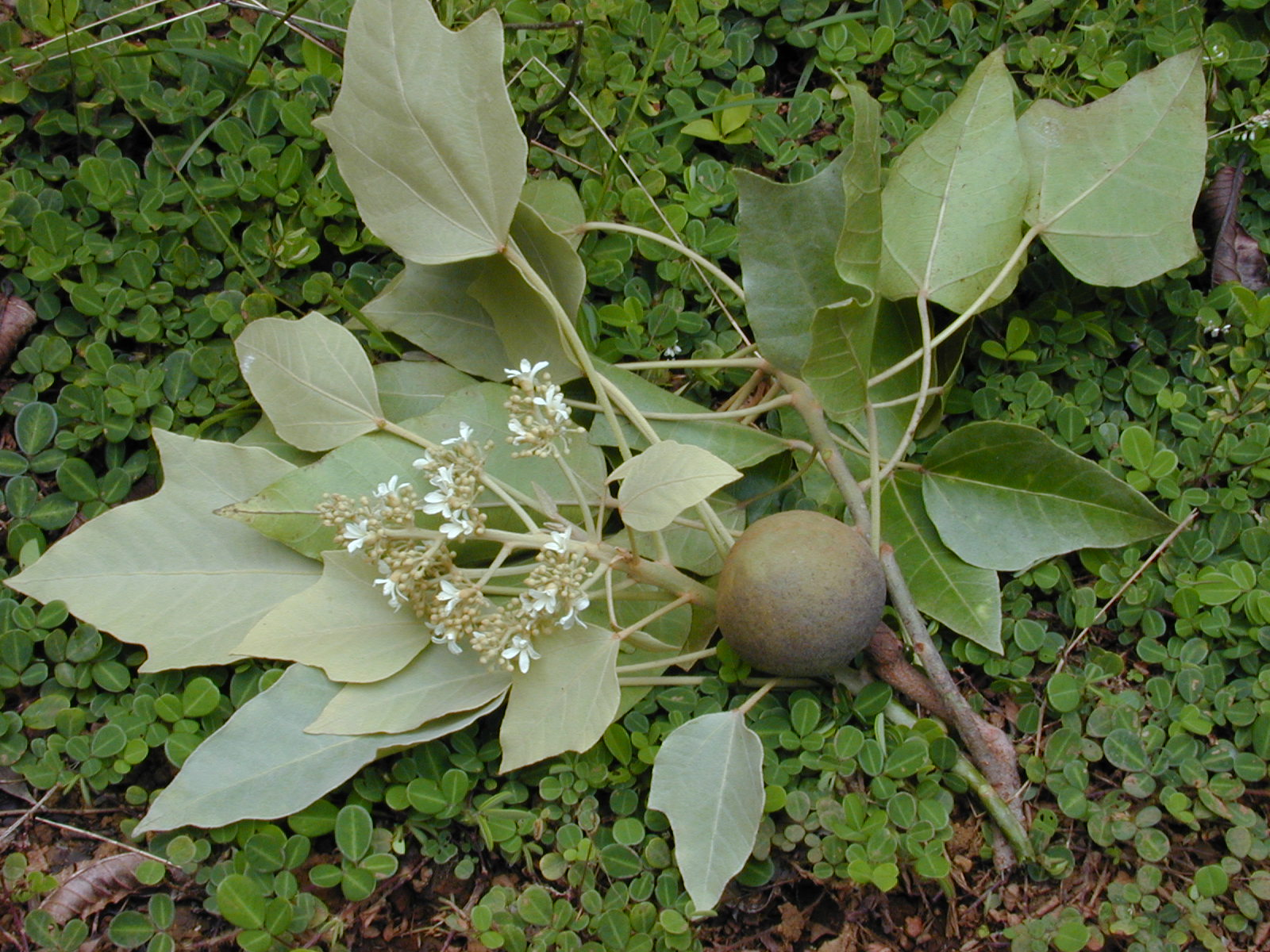
Candlenut (Aleurites moluccanus) leaves, flowers, and fruit from Maui

The candlenut (Aleurites moluccanus) was first domesticated in Maritime Southeast Asia. Remains of harvested candlenuts have been recovered from archaeological sites in Timor and Morotai in eastern Indonesia, dated to around 13,000 BP and 11,000 BP respectively. Archaeological evidence of candlenut cultivation is also found in Neolithic sites of the Toalean culture in southern Sulawesi dated to around 3,700 to 2,300 BP. Candlenut were widely introduced into the Pacific Islands by early Austronesian voyagers and became naturalized to high volcanic islands.

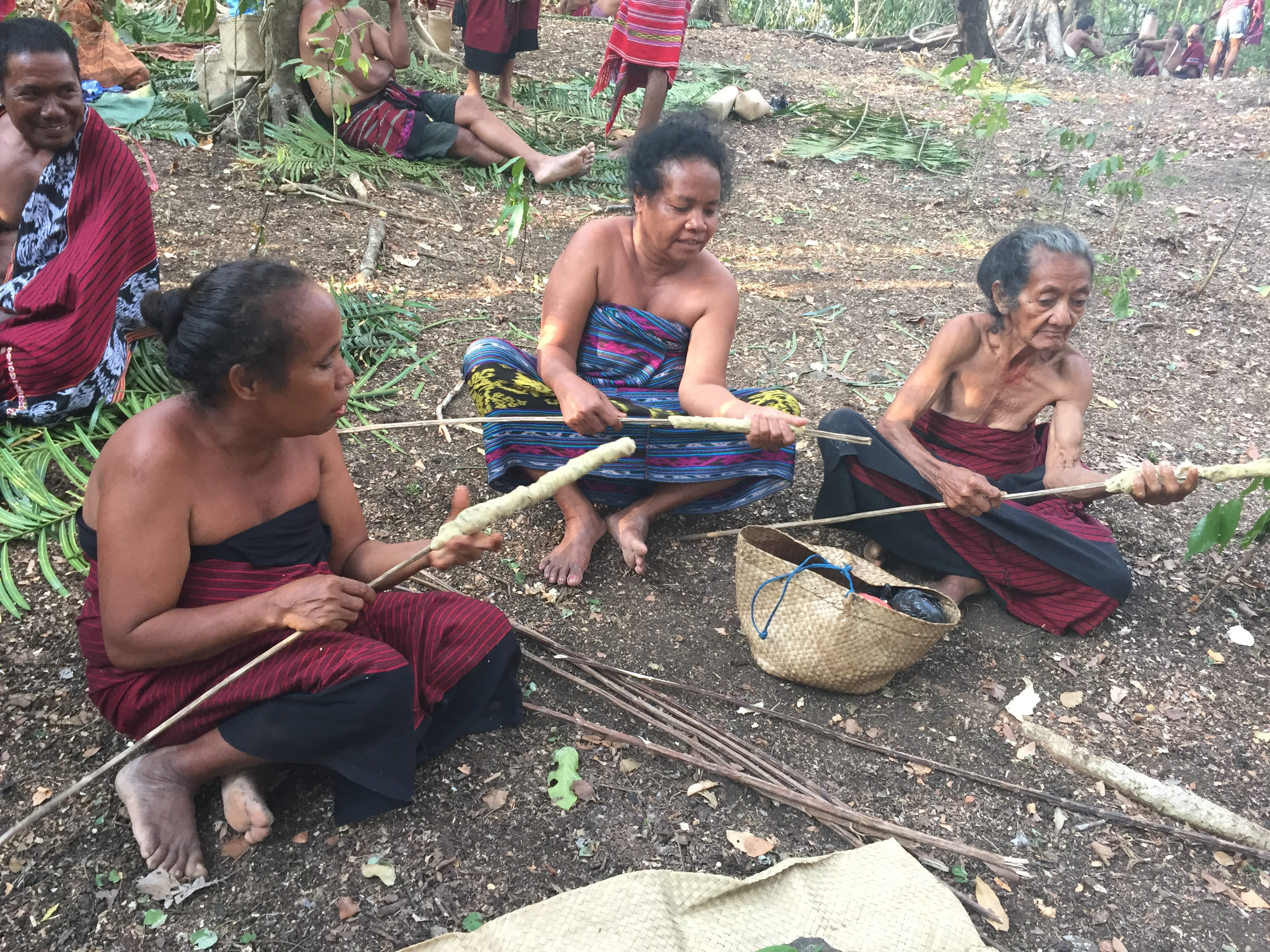
Women preparing candlenut torches for the Baha Liurai festival in Babulo, Timor-Leste

Candlenut has a very wide range of uses, and every part of the tree can be harvested. They were primarily cultivated for the high oil content in their nut kernels. They were widely used for illumination before the introduction of other light sources, hence the name "candlenut". The kernels were skewered onto coconut midribs that were then set alight. Each kernel takes about 3 minutes to burn, so the series could act as a torch. This tradition of making candlenut torches exists in both Southeast Asia and Oceania. Candlenut oil extracted from the nuts can also be used directly in lamps. They can also be used in the production of soaps and ointments, and as preservatives for fishing gear. Other traditional uses include using the timber for making small canoes and carvings; the sap for varnish and resins; the nut shells for ornamentation (most notably as leis), fish-hooks, toys, and the production of black dyes; the bark for medicine and fiber; and so on. Some non-toxic varieties are also used as condiments or ingredients in the cuisines of Southeast Asia and the Pacific.

The Proto-Malayo-Polynesian ("PMP") word for candlenut is reconstructed as *kamiri, with modern cognates including Hanunó'o, Iban, and Sundanese kamiri; Javanese and Malay kemiri; and Tetun kamii.

However, Oceanic words for candlenut are derived instead from Proto-Austronesian *CuSuR, which became PMP *tuhuR, originally meaning "string together, as beads", referring to the construction of the candlenut torches. It became Proto-Eastern-Malayo-Polynesian and Proto-Oceanic *tuRi which is then reduplicated. Modern cognates including Fijian, Tongan, Cook Islands Māori, and Niue tui-tui; and Hawaiian kui-kui or kukui.

=== Alocasia macrorrhizos (giant taro) ===
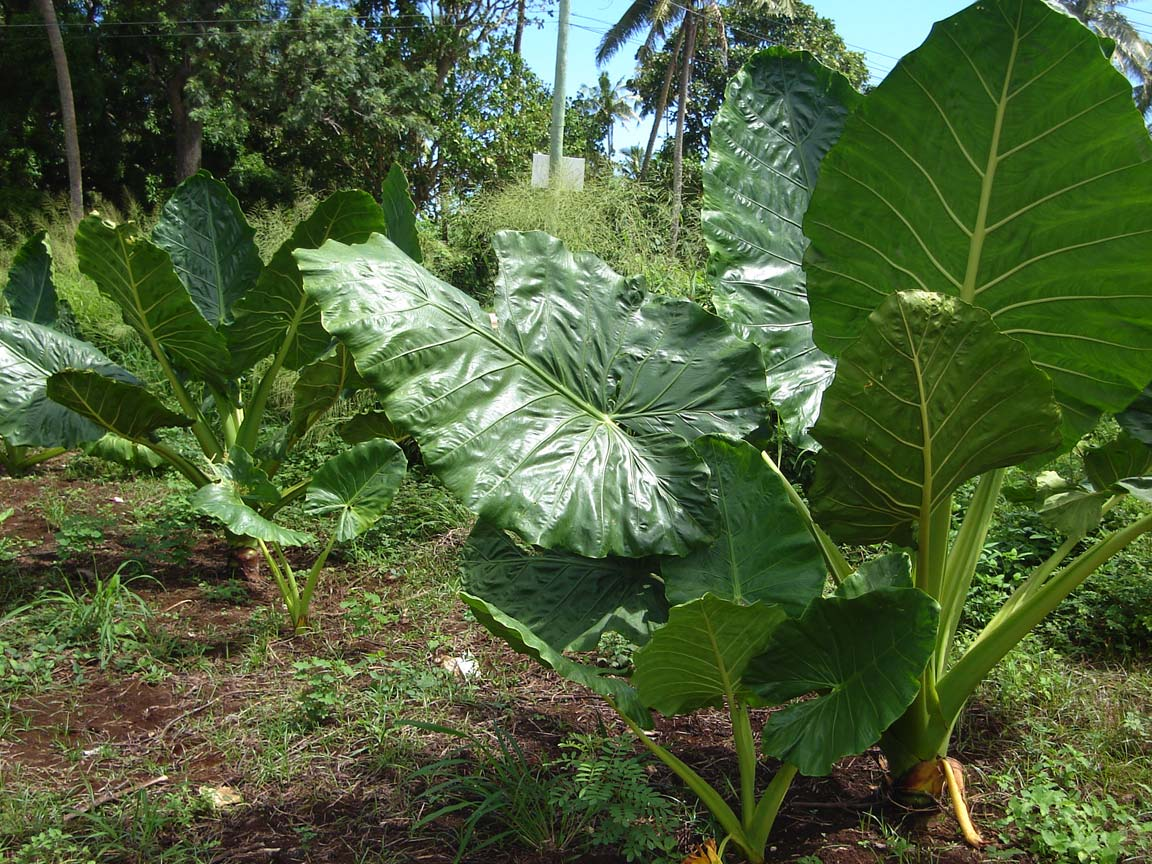
Giant taro (Alocasia macrorrhizos) plantation in Tongatapu, Tonga

The giant taro (Alocasia macrorrhizos) was originally domesticated in the Philippines, but early Austronesians in Taiwan obtained it. From the Philippines, they spread outwards to the rest of Maritime Southeast Asia and eastward to Oceania where it became one of the staple crops of Pacific Islanders. Giant taro is one of the four main species of aroids (Araceae, taros) cultivated by Austronesians primarily as a source of starch, the others being the 'elephant foot yam' Amorphophallus paeoniifolius, the common 'taro' Colocasia esculenta, and the 'giant swamp taro' Cyrtosperma merkusii, each with multiple cultivated varieties. Their leaves and stems are also edible if cooked thoroughly, though this is rarely done with giant taro, as it contains higher levels of raphides, which can cause itching.

The reconstructed word for giant taro in Proto-Austronesian is *biRaq, which became Proto-Oceanic *piRaq. Modern cognates for it in languages of Maritime Southeast Asia and Micronesia include the first-order language Rukai vi'a or bi'a in Taiwan; the Philippine forms Ifugao bila; Ilocano, Cebuano, Bikol, and Mongondow biga; Teduray bira; the Greater Barito forms Ngaju biha and Malagasy via; Malayic Malay and Chamic Acehnese birah; Palauan bísə; Chamorro piga; Bima wia; Timoric Rote–Meto and Tetun fia; and the CEMP Central Maluku languages Asilulu hila and Kowiai fira. In Oceania, cognates for it include Malayo-Polynesian Wuvulu-Aua pia; Oceanic Southeast Solomonic ꞋAreꞌare and Western Oceanic Papuan Tip Motu hira; Papuan Tip Kilivila and Central Oceanic Fijian via; and Eastern Malayo-Polynesian Hawaiian pia. Note that in some cases, cognates have shifted to refer to other types of taro or, in the case of many Polynesian languages, to "pia" as arrowroot. In Polynesia, the most common word for Alocasia macrorrhiza is "kape" or "'ape."

=== Amorphophallus paeoniifolius (elephant foot yam) ===
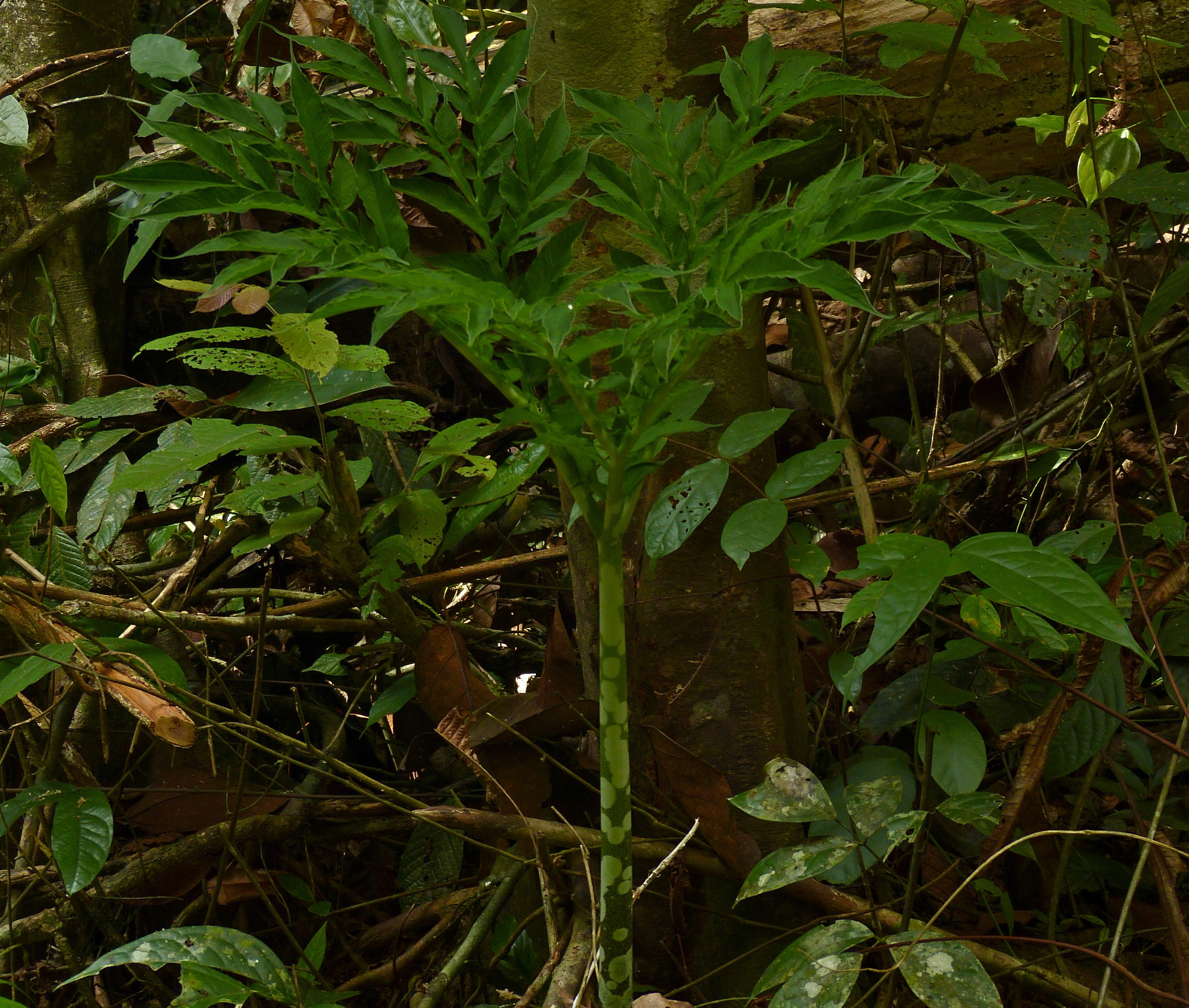
Elephant foot yam in Taman Negara, Malaysia

The elephant foot yam Amorphophallus paeoniifolius is used as food in Maritime Southeast Asia, Mainland Southeast Asia, and South Asia. Its origin and center of domestication were formerly considered to be India, where it is most widely utilized as a food resource in recent times. A genetic study in 2017 demonstrated that Indian populations of elephant foot yams have lower genetic diversity than those in Maritime Southeast Asia and elephant foot yams originated from Maritime Southeast Asia and spread westwards into Thailand and India, resulting in three independent domestication events. From Maritime Southeast Asia, Austronesians also spread even further west into Madagascar and eastwards to coastal New Guinea and Oceania, although they may have spread south into Australia without human intervention.

The elephant foot yam is one of the four main species of Arecae cultivated by Austronesians primarily as a source of starch, the others being Alocasia macrorrhizos, common taro, and Cyrtosperma merkusii, each with multiple cultivated varieties. Elephant foot yam, however, is the least important among the four and was likely only eaten as a famine food, since it contains more raphides, which cause irritation if not cooked thoroughly.

=== Areca catechu (areca palm) ===
The practice of chewing areca nuts originated in Maritime Southeast Asia, where the areca palm is native. The oldest known evidence of areca nut chewing was found in a burial pit in the Duyong Cave site in the Philippines (to which areca palms are native), which dates to around 4,630±250 BP. Its diffusion is closely tied to the Neolithic expansion of the Austronesian peoples. It was spread to the Indo-Pacific during prehistoric times, reaching Micronesia at 3,500 to 3,000 BP, Near Oceania at 3,400 to 3,000 BP; South India and Sri Lanka by 3,500 BP; Mainland Southeast Asia by 3,000 to 2,500 BP; Northern India by 1500 BP; and Madagascar by 600 BP. From India, it was also spread westwards to Persia and the Mediterranean. It was also previously present in the Lapita culture, based on archaeological remains dated from 3,600 to 2,500 BP, but it was not carried into Polynesia.

=== Artocarpus ===
Numerous species of Artocarpus are traditionally cultivated or harvested from semi-domesticated or wild populations in Maritime Southeast Asia and Micronesia for food, timber, traditional medicine, and other uses. They include Artocarpus anisophyllus (entawak), Artocarpus heterophyllus (jackfruit or nangka), Artocarpus integer (cempedak), Artocarpus lacucha (lakuch), Artocarpus mariannensis (Marianas breadfruit), Artocarpus odoratissimus (tarap or marang), and Artocarpus treculianus (tipuho), among many others. The most important species pertaining to the Austronesian expansion however, are Artocarpus camansi (breadnut or seeded breadfruit) and Artocarpus altilis (breadfruit).

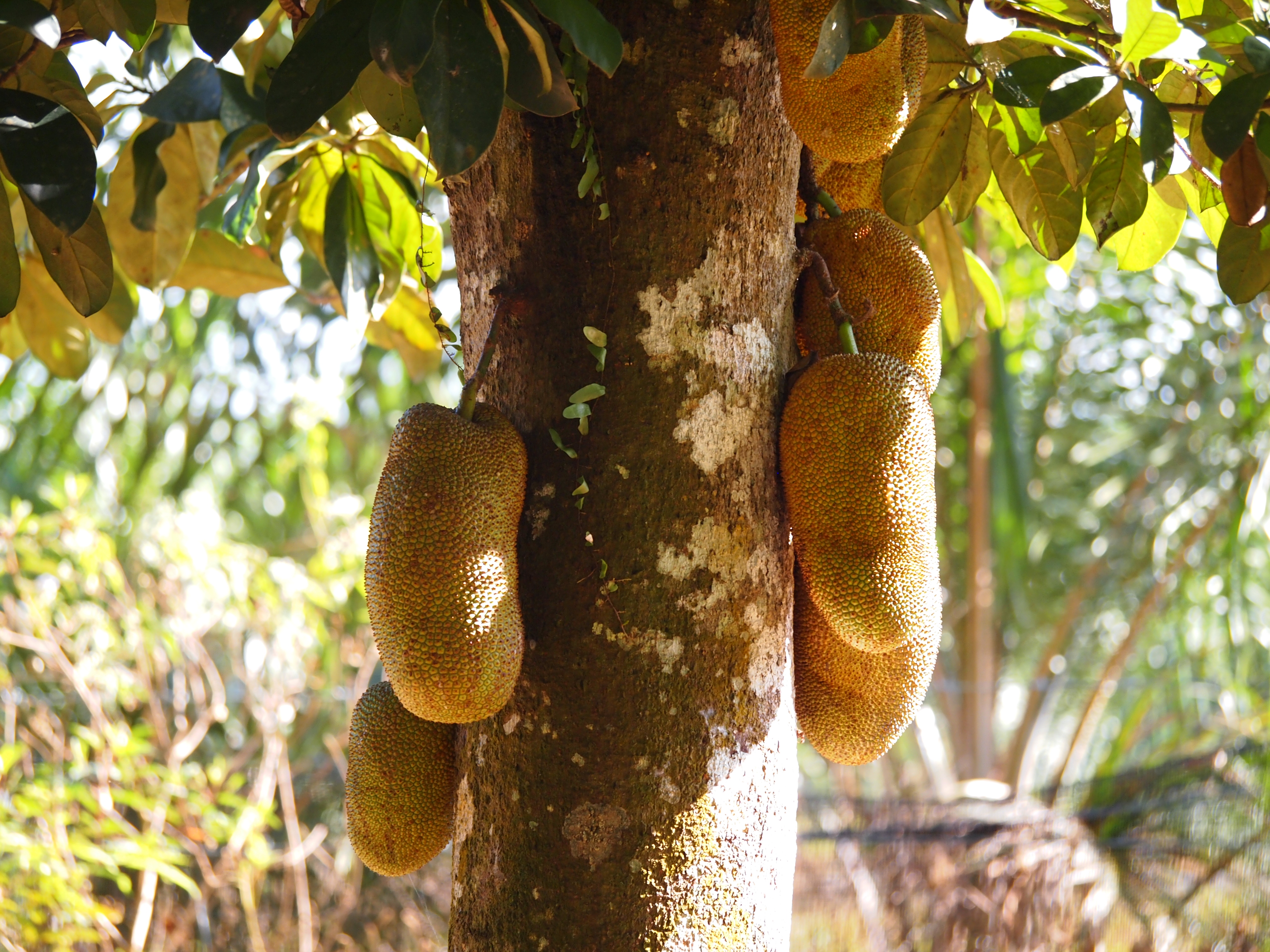
Cempedak (Artocarpus integer) in Malaysia

==== Artocarpus altilis (breadfruit) ====
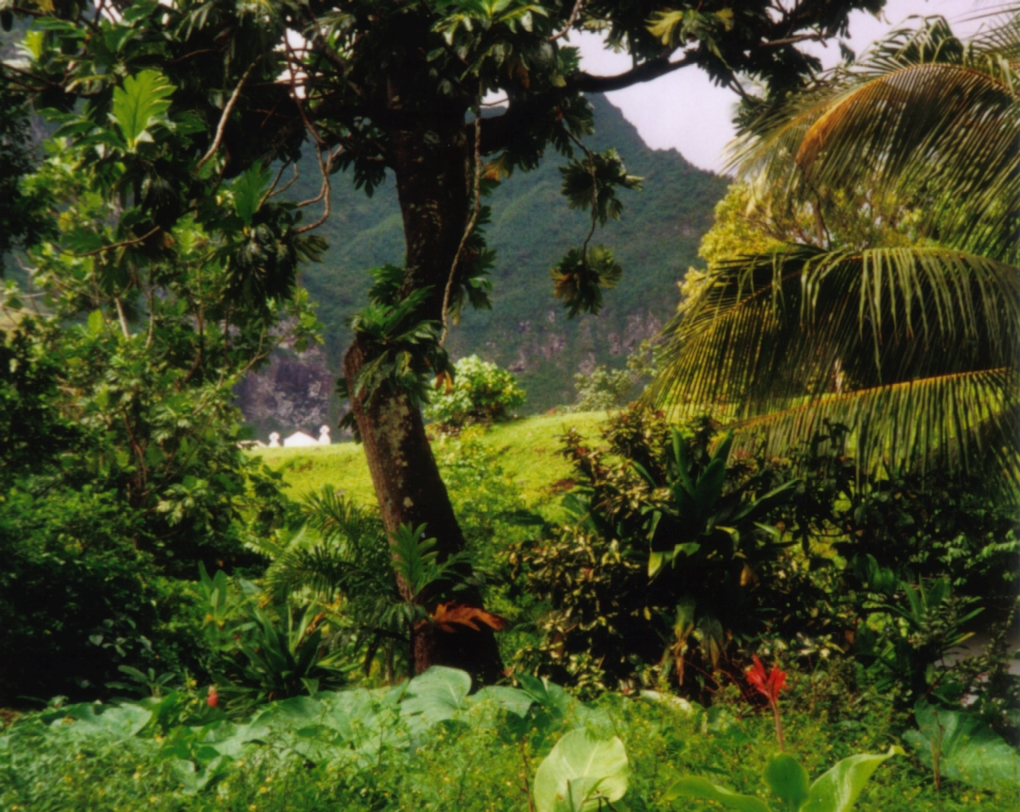
Breadfruit tree in Fatu-Hiva, Marquesas Islands

According to DNA fingerprinting studies, the wild seeded ancestor of Artocarpus altilis is the Artocarpus camansi, which is native to New Guinea, the Maluku Islands, and the Philippines. A. camansi was domesticated and selectively bred in Polynesia, giving rise to the mostly seedless Artocarpus altilis. Micronesian breadfruit also show evidence of hybridization with the native Artocarpus mariannensis, while most Polynesian and Melanesian cultivars do not. This indicates that Micronesia was initially colonized separately from Polynesia and Melanesia through two different migration events which later came into contact with each other in eastern Micronesia.

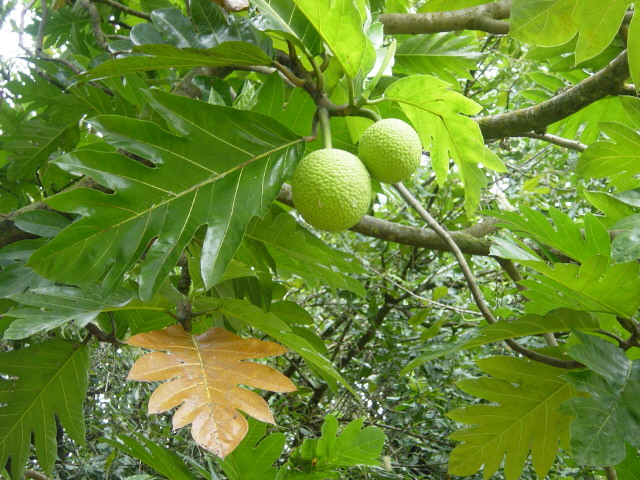
Breadfruit (Artocarpus altilis) in Hawaii

The reconstructed Proto-Malayo-Polynesian word for breadfruit is *kuluʀ, which became Proto-Oceanic *kulur and Proto-Polynesian *kulu. Modern cognates include Sundanese and Malay kulur or kelur; Acehnese kulu; Iban kurur; Cebuano kulo or kolo; Muna kula; Mussau ulu; Kapingamarangi gulu; Wayan Fijian kulu; Emae kuro; Tuamotuan, Takuu, and Rarotongan kuru; Tahitian ʻuru; Samoan and Hawaiian ʻulu; and Māori kuru. Note that in Māori, kuru is only mentioned in tradition, but does not refer to the plant because breadfruit did not survive into New Zealand. Also note that it is believed that breadfruit only reached western Maritime Southeast Asia (Java, Sumatra, Malay Peninsula) during the recent centuries, as a result of trade with the Maluku Islands.

Another notable reconstructed word for breadfruit is Proto-Oceanic *maRi or *mai. It is a common root for words for breadfruit in Micronesia, northern and western New Guinea, the Solomon Islands, the Admiralty Islands, St Matthias Islands, New Caledonia, and parts of the Central Pacific. The term itself may have originally been for Artocarpus mariannensis instead of Artocarpus altilis. Cognates include Pohnpeian, Mokil, and Ngatik māi; Palauan, Satawal, and Tuvaluan mai; Puluwat mais; Yapese maiyah; and Tongan, Niuean, and Marquesan mei.

==== Artocarpus heterophyllus (jackfruit) ====
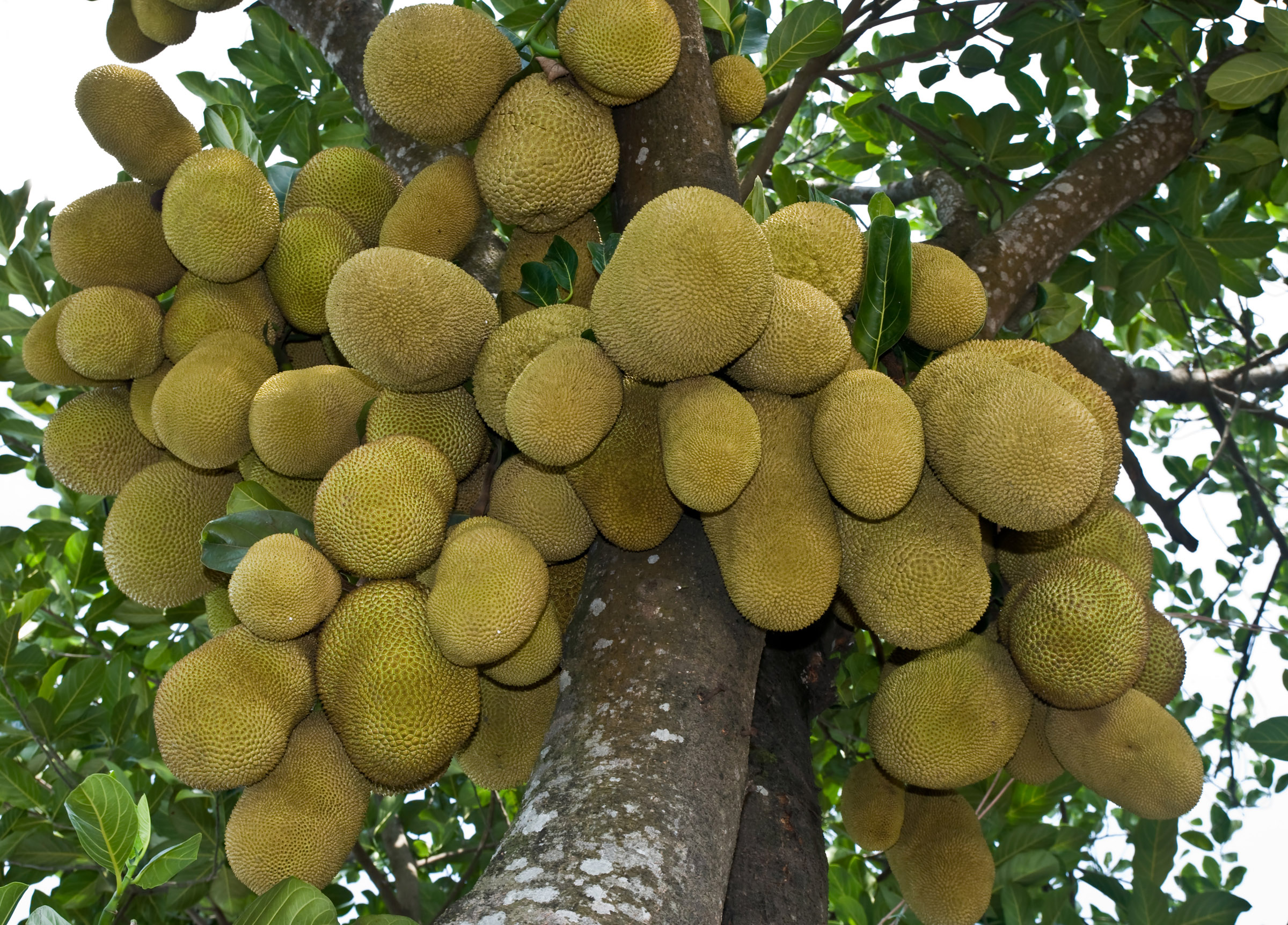
Jackfruit tree with fruits

The jackfruit (Artocarpus heterophyllus) was domesticated independently in South Asia and Southeast Asia, as evidenced by the fact that the Southeast Asian names for the fruit are not derived from the Sanskrit roots. It was probably first domesticated by Austronesians in Java or the Malay Peninsula. The word for jackfruit in Proto-Western-Malayo-Polynesian is reconstructed as *laŋkaq. Modern cognates include Sundanese, Javanese, Malay, Balinese, and Cebuano nangka; Tagalog, Pangasinan, Bikol and Ilocano langka; Chamorro lanka or nanka; Kelabit nakan; Wolio nangke; Ibaloi dangka; and Lun Dayeh laka. Note, however, that the fruit was only recently introduced to Guam via Filipino settlers when both were part of the Spanish Empire.

=== Bambusoideae (bamboos) ===
Bamboo forest in Taiwan

Various species of bamboo (subfamily Bambusoideae) are found throughout Maritime Southeast Asia, Mainland Southeast Asia, East Asia, and South Asia. In Austronesian regions, different types of bamboos have different names, as well as the products made from them. They are used variously as building materials, fishing gear, musical instruments, knives, water and food vessels, and so on. Bamboo shoots are also a food source in Southeast Asia. A few species of bamboo were carried by Austronesian settlers as they colonized the Pacific islands. They include the ʻohe (Schizostachyum glaucifolium), the common bamboo (Bambusa vulgaris), and the thorny bamboo (Bambusa bambos).

Reconstructed Proto-Austronesian words that referred to bamboo include *qauR, *kawayan, *buluq, and *betung. The latter entered Proto-Malayo-Polynesian and Proto-Oceanic as *bitung, with cognates including Sundanese awi bitung; Fijian bitu; and Tongan pitu. Most terms for bamboo in Polynesia, however, originated from Proto-South-Central-Pacific *kofe (originally from Proto-Polynesian *kofe, "root"). Modern cognates include Tongan and Niue kofe; Tokelau, Marquesan, Tuamotuan, and Māori kohe; Rarotongan koʻe; Samoan and Tahitian ʻofe; and Hawaiian ʻohe. Some names have also shifted to refer to bamboo-like plants; especially in islands where they were not introduced into or did not survive, like in New Zealand.

=== Benincasa hispida (wax gourd) ===
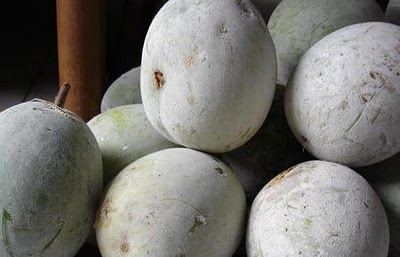
Wax gourds being sold in Indonesia

=== Broussonetia papyrifera (paper mulberry) ===
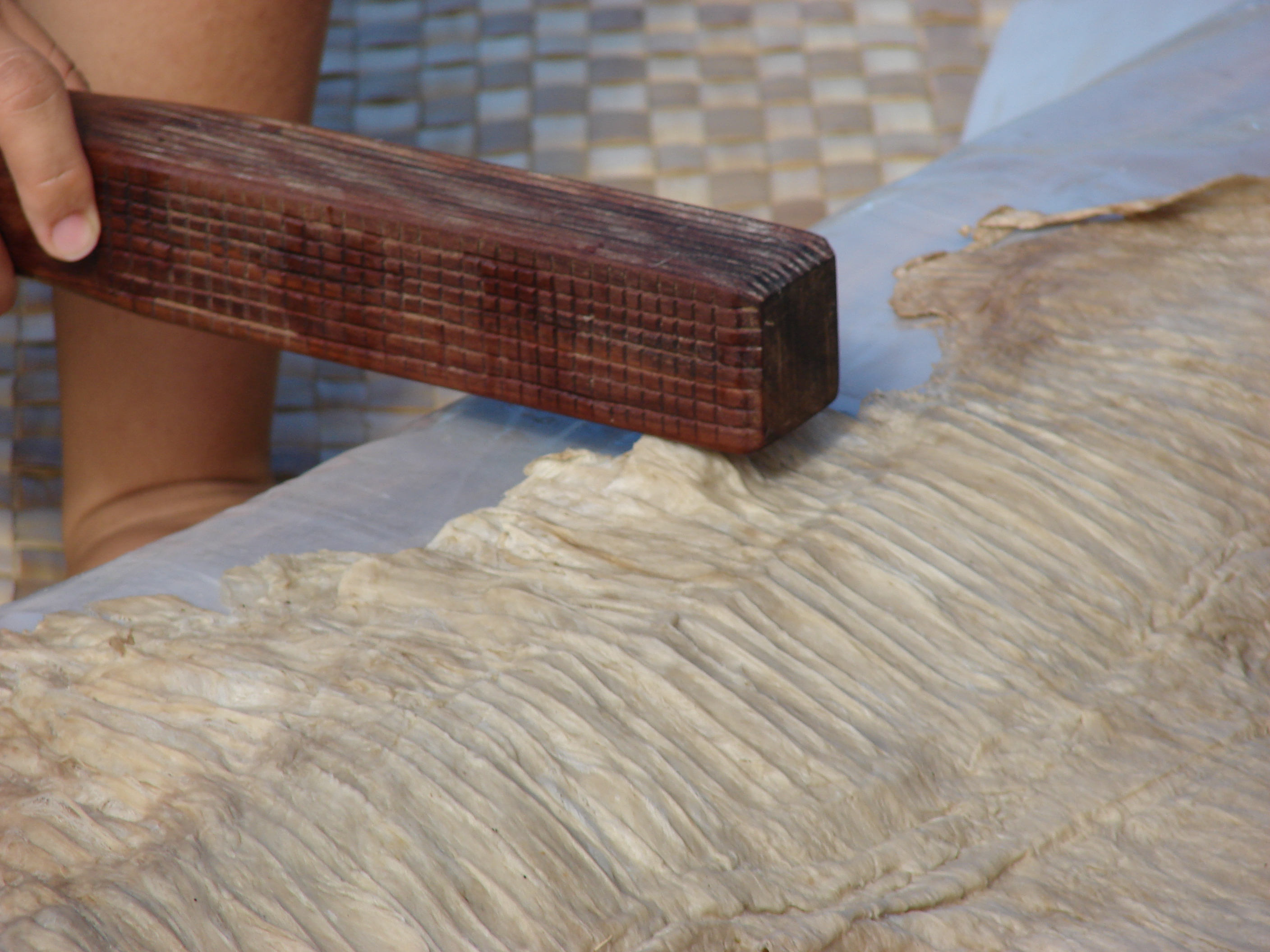
Kapa cloth being pounded in Maui, Hawaii

Paper mulberry (Broussonetia papyrifera), better known as "tapa cloth tree" in the Pacific, originates from subtropical regions in mainland Asia and is one of the best evidence for the mainstream "Out of Taiwan" hypothesis of the Austronesian expansion. Various genetic studies have traced the origins of paper mulberry populations in the Remote Pacific all the way to Taiwan via New Guinea and Sulawesi. In the Philippines, which was along the expansion path, paper mulberry are mostly descendants of modern introductions in 1935. It is presumed that ancient introductions of paper mulberry went extinct in prehistory due to its replacement with hand-woven fabrics, given that paper mulberry generally only survives under human cultivation. However, its absence in the Philippines further underlines its origins in Taiwan, and not within Maritime Southeast Asia. Additionally paper mulberry populations in New Guinea also show genetic inflow from another expansion out of Indochina and South China.

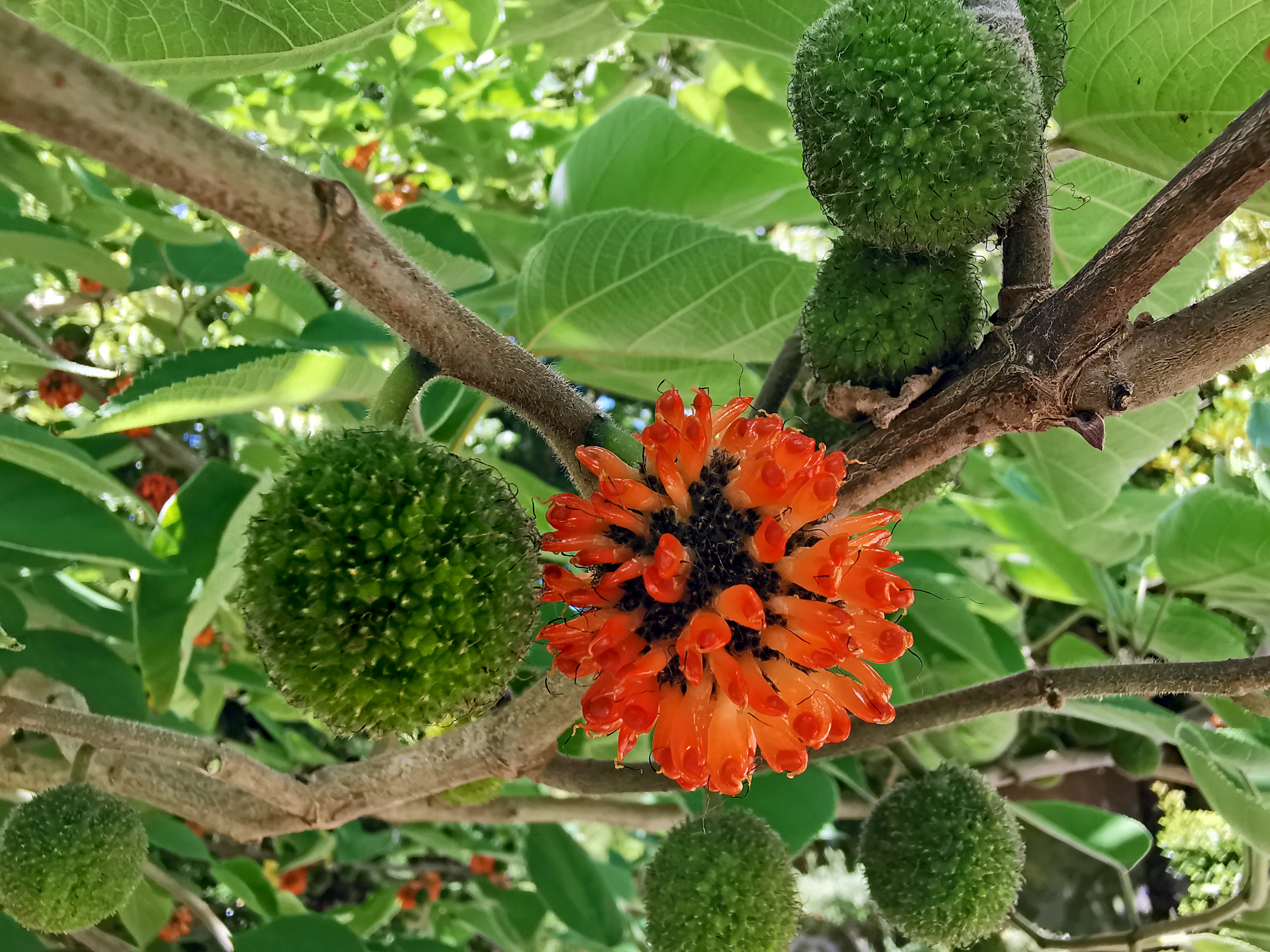
Paper mulberry fruits

It is believed to be the most widely transported fiber crop in prehistory, having been transported along with the full range of the Austronesian expansion, as opposed to most of the other commensal crops in Oceania. Paper mullbery is present in almost every island or island group in Polynesia, including Easter Island and New Zealand. Some populations have gone recently extinct after they stopped being cultivated, like in the Cook Islands and Mangareva, although accounts and prepared barkcloth and herbarium specimens of them exist in museum collections gathered by Europeans during the Colonial Period. They were spread by Polynesians primarily through vegetative propagation with cuttings and root shoots. They were rarely cultivated from seeds as most plants were harvested prior to flowering, when the stems reach around 1 in (2.5 cm) in diameter, as described by 18th century European accounts. It is also unknown if the feral plants reproduced sexually as the plants are dioecious and require both male and female specimens to be present in one island.

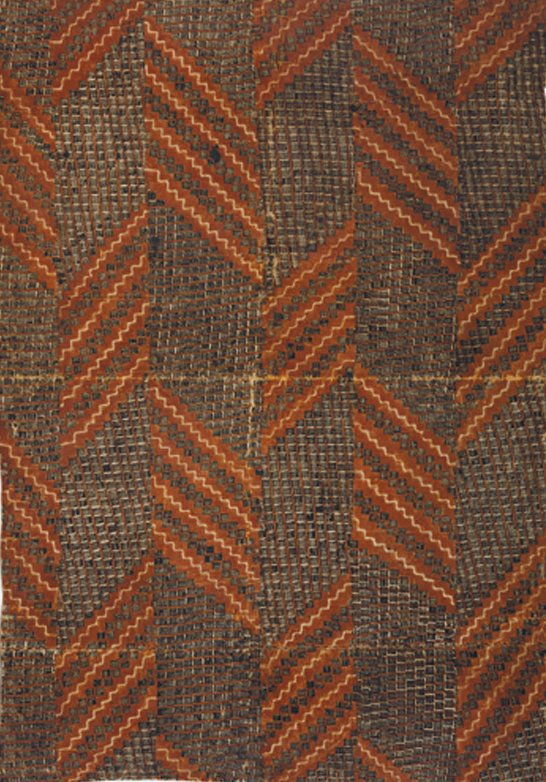
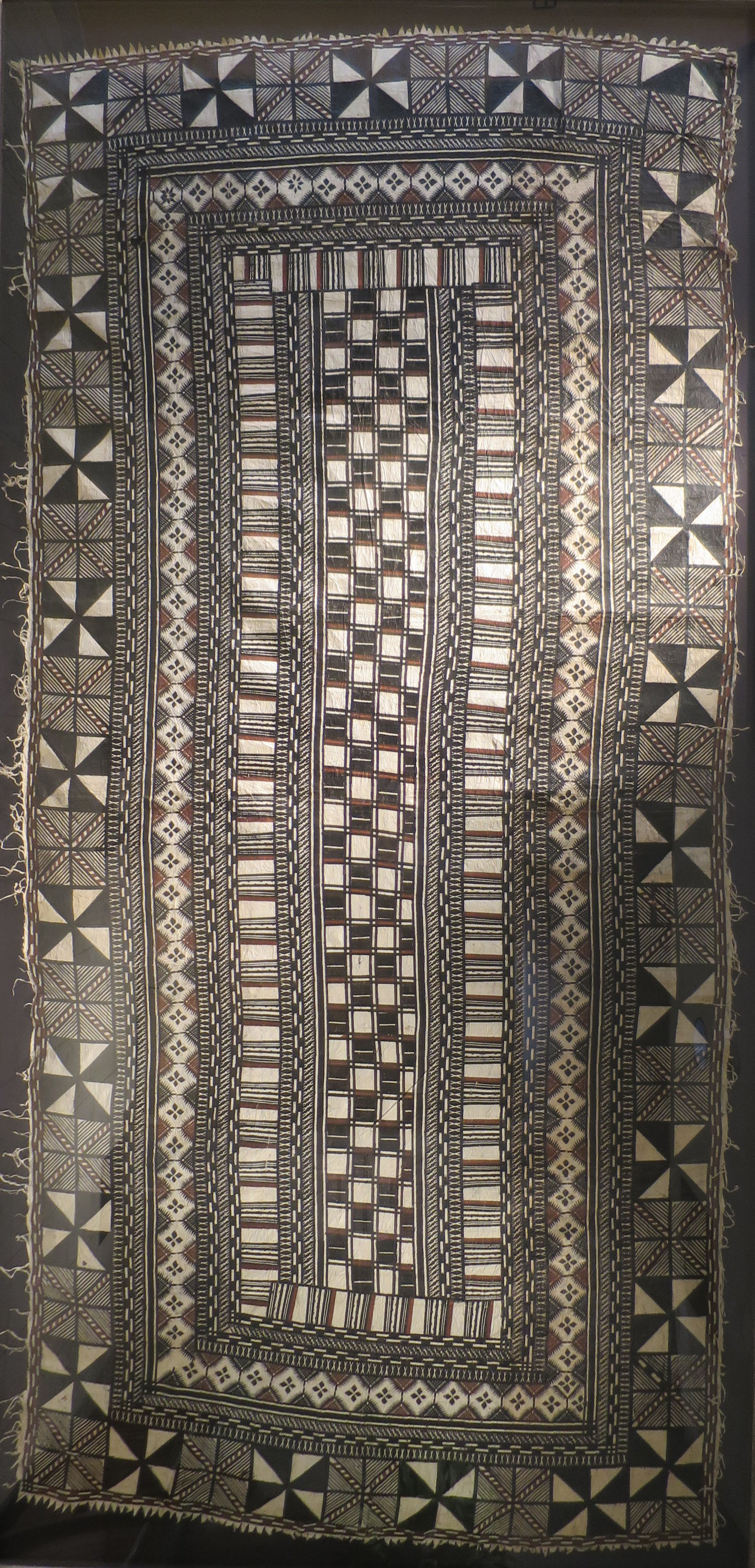
Left: 18th century kapa from Hawaii
Right: 19th century royal tapa from Fiji

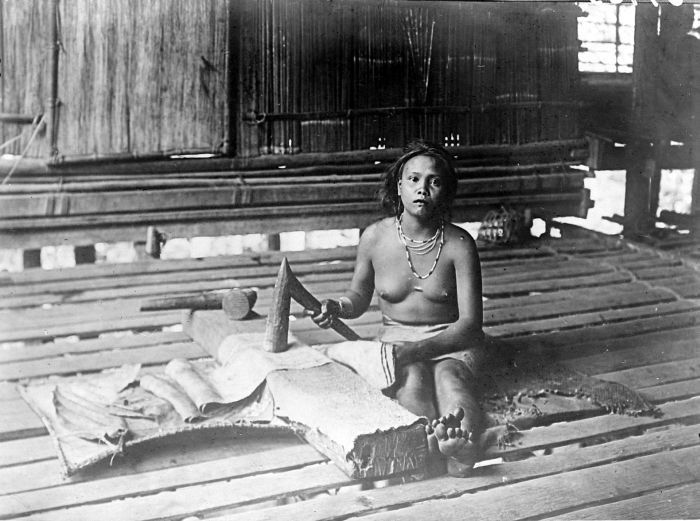
A Dayak woman pounding barkcloth (likely made from Ficus or Artocarpus spp.) in Borneo, c. 1900 – 1938

Paper mulberry is primarily used in the Pacific Islands to make barkcloth (tapa in most Polynesian languages). Barkcloth, can also be made from other members of the mulberry family (Moraceae), including Ficus (figs) and Artocarpus. Barkcloth was also occasionally made from Pipturus nettles, especially in Hawaii. However the highest quality of barkcloth was from paper mulberry.

Barkcloth was mainly used for clothing among ancient Austronesians and is traditionally made using characteristic stone or wooden beaters which are among the most common artifacts found in Austronesian archaeological sites. Numerous archaeological remains of barkcloth beaters in southern China has been regarded as evidence that the pre-Taiwan Austronesian homelands were located in the region prior to the southward expansion of the Han Dynasty, particularly around the Pearl River Delta. The oldest such remains is from the Dingmo Site in Guangxi, dated to around 7,900 BP. Barkcloth remained an important source of clothing fabrics in pre-colonial Melanesia, Polynesia, and parts of Indonesia. However, it has been mostly replaced by woven fiber clothing in most of Maritime Southeast Asia and Micronesia.

There are numerous names for paper mulberry throughout Austronesia, the most general can be reconstructed to Proto-Central Eastern Malayo-Polynesian *malaw, which also refers to the loincloth and other items of clothing made from paper mulberry bark. Its cognates including Selaru mal; Asilulu mala ai; Buli māl; Numfor mār; Tanga, Tolai, and Gedaged mal; Rennellese mago; Kairiru myal; Lusi, Kove, Manam, Gitua, Mota, Niue, Futunan, Samoan, Tuvaluan, Nukuoro, Anuta, and Hawaiian malo; and Arosi, Rarotongan, and Māori maro.

In Eastern Polynesia, terms for paper mulberry can also be reconstructed to Proto-Central Eastern-Polynesian *aute, with cognates including Tahitian and Rarotongan ʻaute; Marquesan ute; Hawaiian wauke; Rapa and Māori aute.

In most of Polynesia, the term for barkcloth can also be reconstructed from Proto-Nuclear-Polynesian *taba, meaning "bark", with cognates including Wayan taba; Tongan, Samoan, Mangareva, and Rarotongan tapa; and Hawaiian kapa. Other terms widely used for barkcloth and paper mulberry are derived from the Proto-Polynesian reconstructed word *siapo, with cognates including Niue, Tongan, and Marquesan hiapo; and Samoan and East Futunan siapo. The term for barkcloth beater, however, can be reconstructed more extensively back to Proto-Malayo-Polynesian *ike, with cognates including Uma ike; Sa'a iki; Bauan, Tongan, and East Futunan ike; and Samoan and Hawaiian iʻe.

=== Calophyllum inophyllum (mastwood) ===
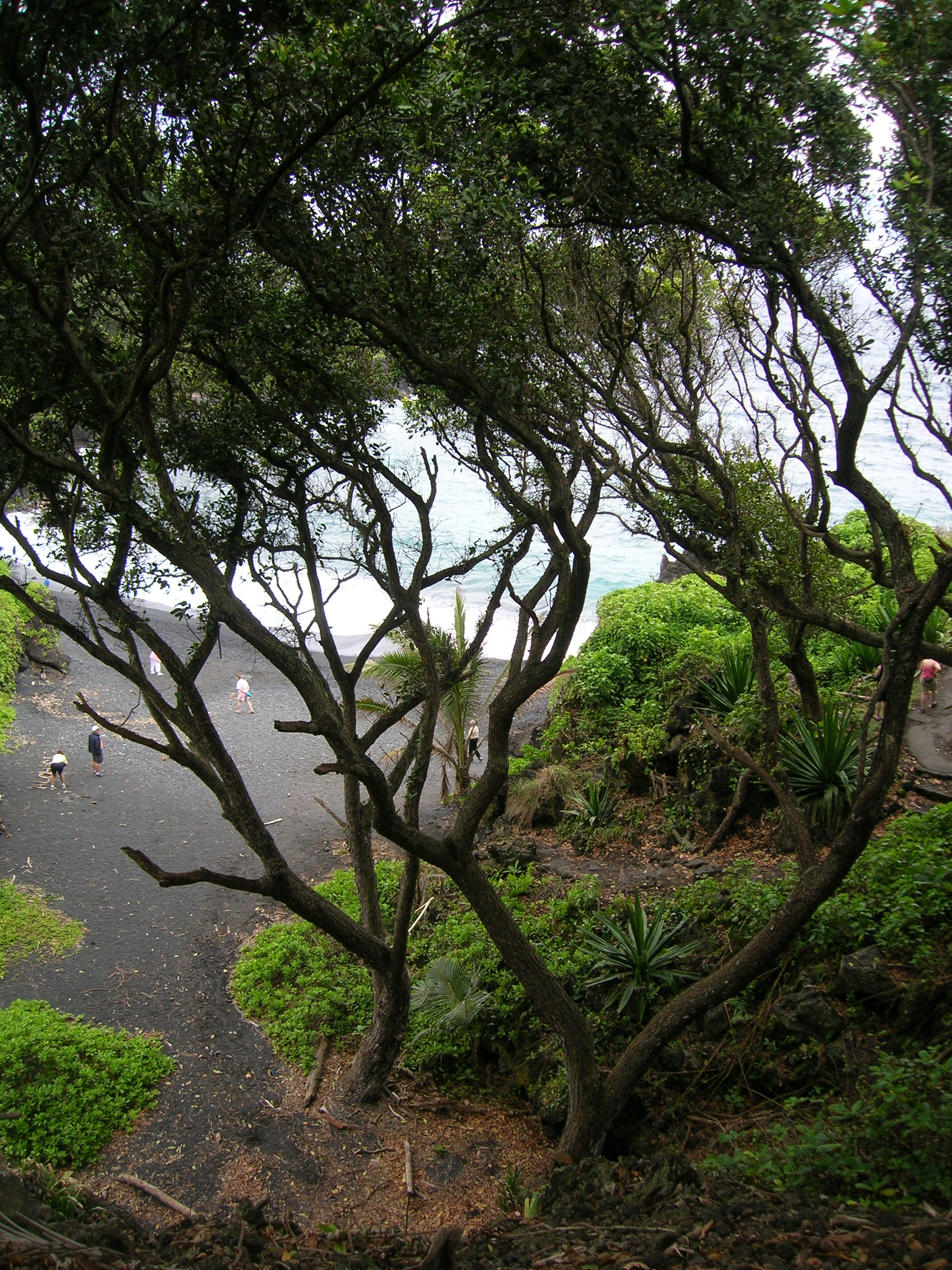
Mastwood in Waiʻanapanapa, Maui

Mastwood (Calophyllum inophyllum) is a widespread timber tree native to tropical Asia. It is notable for its ability to grow to massive sizes in sandy or rocky beaches of island and coastal habitats, as well as its habit of sending out arching large trunks over the water where its seeds are dispersed via the currents. Due to these characters, mastwood are of particular importance to traditional shipbuilding of the larger Austronesian outrigger ships and were carried with them as they migrated to Oceania and Madagascar.

Other species of the genus Calophyllum were also used similarly, like Calophyllum soulattri, Calophyllum peekelii, and Calophyllum goniocarpum. The wood grain of the members of the genus are characteristically interlocked, which make them harder to work with but also makes them stronger as well as being more suitable for carving intricate shapes. They were comparable in importance to how oaks were in European shipbuilding and timber industries. In many parts of Polynesia, mastwood groves planted in marae were considered sacred and abodes of spirits. Mastwood were also carved into religious objects like tiki. They are also commonly mentioned in the chants and folklore of Polynesia.

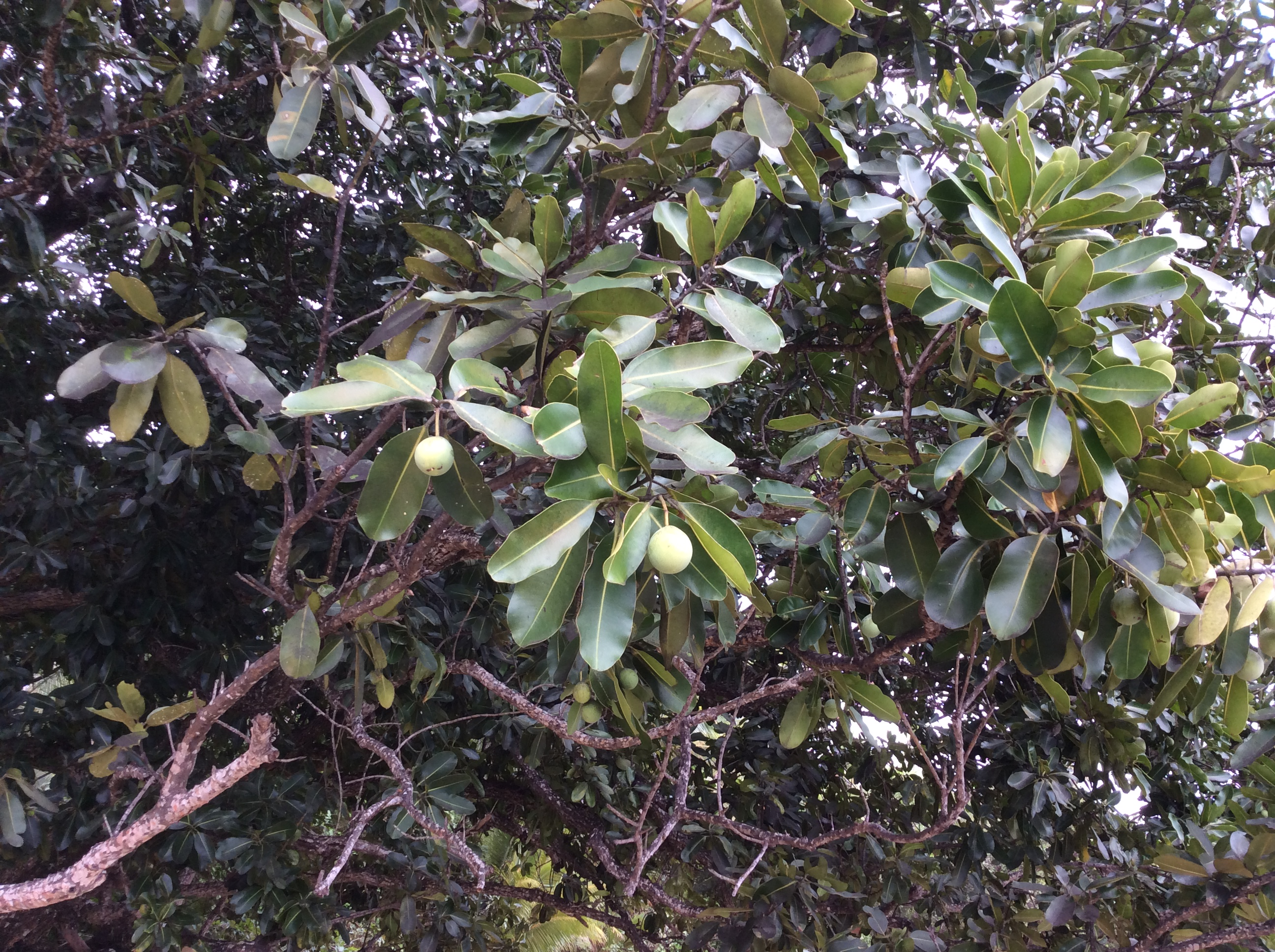
The ball-like fruits of mastwood in Beqa, Fiji

Various parts of the mastwood were integral to the manufacture of outrigger canoes. The large curving limbs were commonly carved into the dugout canoes that formed the keel of the Austronesian outriggers ships. The strakes, which are attached to the keel by the uniquely Austronesian technique of "sewing" them with a combination of dowels and lashed lugs instead of nails, can also be made from mastwood, but it is more commonly made from other "softer" timber species like Artocarpus. Other pieces became masts, outrigger floats, and outrigger spars. Smaller curving limbs can also be carved into the ribs of the boat.

Aside from shipbuilding, tamanu oil extracted from the fruit kernels were important in Polynesian culture. The oils, as well as poultices made from leaves and flowers, are also commonly used for traditional medicine. The leaves contain compounds that are poisonous to fish and can be used as fish poison.

The reconstructed Proto-Austronesian word for mastwood is *bitaquR, with modern cognates including Ilocano bittáug; Ifugao bitául; Bikol, Cebuano, Maranao, Mansaka and Manobo bitáʻog or bitaʻug; Nias bito; Palauan btáʻəs; Wetan witora; and Asilulu hataul. The Western Malayo-Polynesian words for mastwood is derived from the doublet Proto-Austronesian *bintaŋuR, with cognates including Iban, Malay and Toba Batak bintangur or bentangur; Tontemboan wintangor; and Malagasy vintáno. In Proto-Oceanic, the reconstructed word is pitaquR, with cognates including Nauna pitɨ; Loniu pitow; Nali pirow; Seimat hita; Aua piʻaw; Pohnpeian isou; Rotuman hefau; Fijian vetau, Tongan fetaʻu; Niue, Samoan, and Tuvaluan fetau; Nukuoro hedau; and Rennellese hetaʻu. In most of these languages, the name specifically refers to C. inophyllum, although in Ifugao, Maranao, Nias, Wetan, and Fijian, the name has become more generalized to large timber trees.

Another set of cognates for C. inophyllum in Proto-Oceanic can be reconstructed as *tamanu. Its difference from *pitaquR is unclear, but given the distinction between the terms in the Mussau reflex, *tamanu probably originally referred to specimens of the tree that grow in island interiors and not on the coastlines. Modern cognates include Mussau, Tongan, Niue, Samoan, and Rarotongan tamanu; Fijian damanu; and Hawaiian kamani.

=== Cananga odorata (ylang-ylang) ===
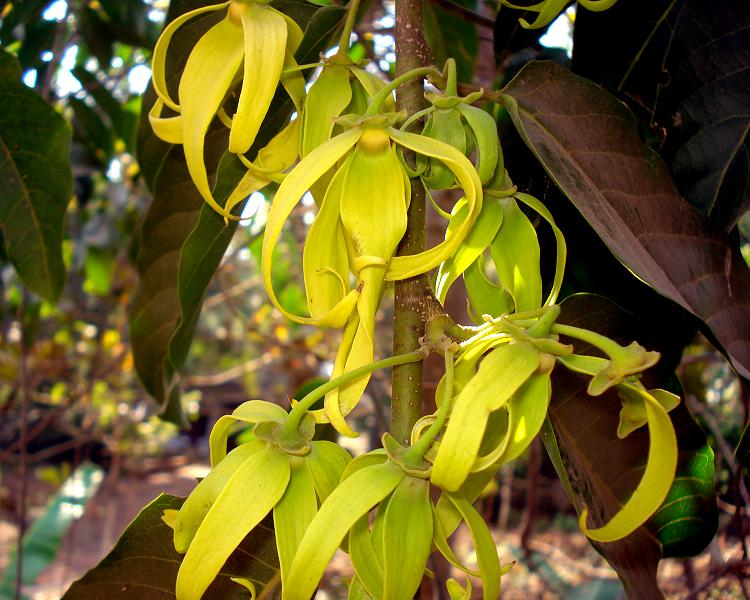
Flowers of Cananga odorata

Cananga odorata, with its large, aromatic flowers, is used for ornamentation. The species originated from the Philippines. It is not known whether it is native to Polynesia and Melanesia or introduced.

=== Citrus ===
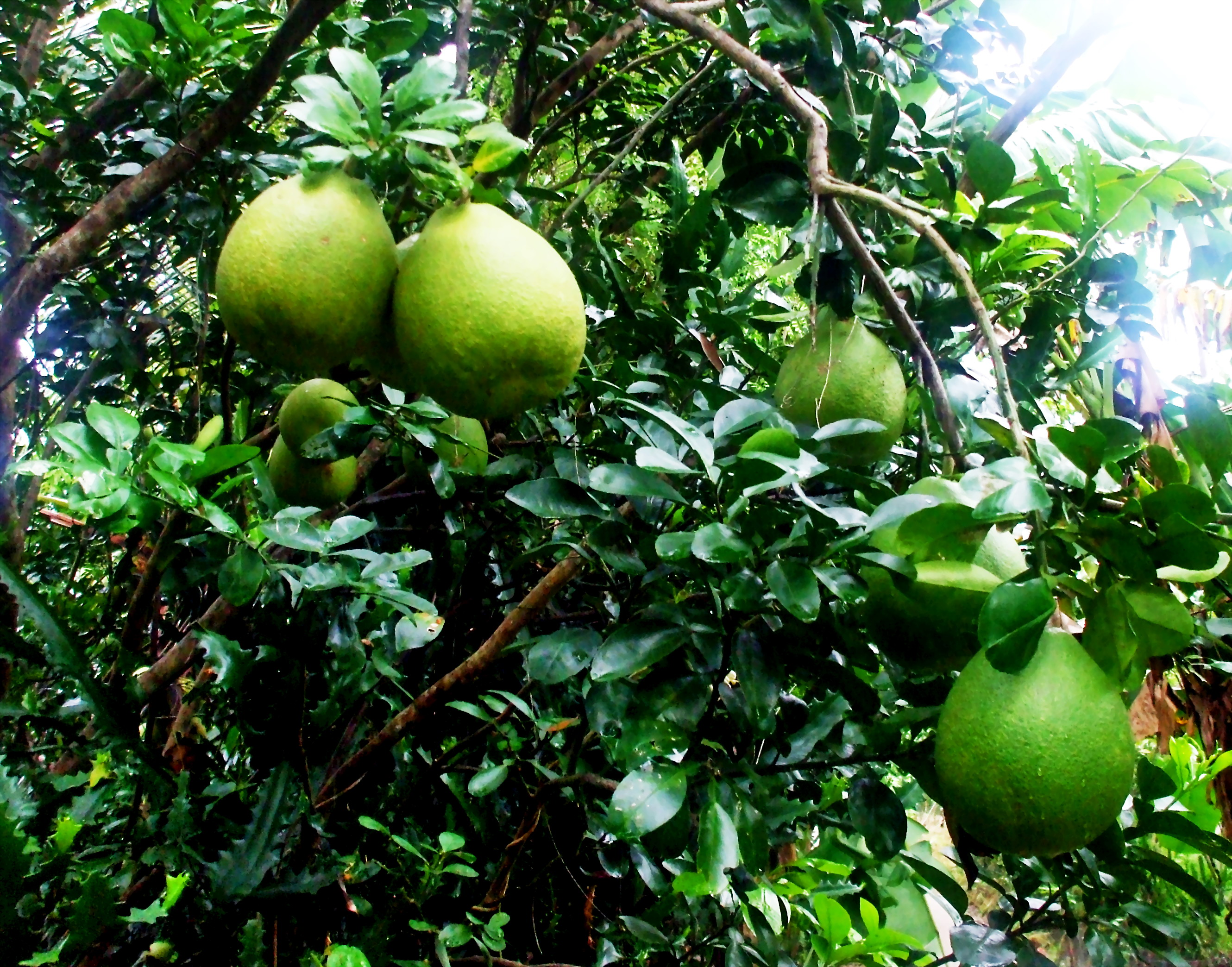
Pomelo tree in southern Vietnam

Numerous species of Citrus are native to Maritime Southeast Asia, Mainland Southeast Asia, East Asia, South Asia and Near Oceania. The Austronesians cultivated and gathered a variety of citrus for food, medicine and washing with the thorns being used as piercing implements for tattooing. Citrus hystrix, Citrus macroptera, and Citrus maxima were also among the canoe plants carried by Austronesian voyagers eastwards into Micronesia and Polynesia. Most Polynesian names describing citruses are named moli ultimately from Proto-Oceanic *molis; whether a link to PMP *limaw is present (albeit indirect) or otherwise is uncertain.

=== Cocos nucifera (coconut) ===
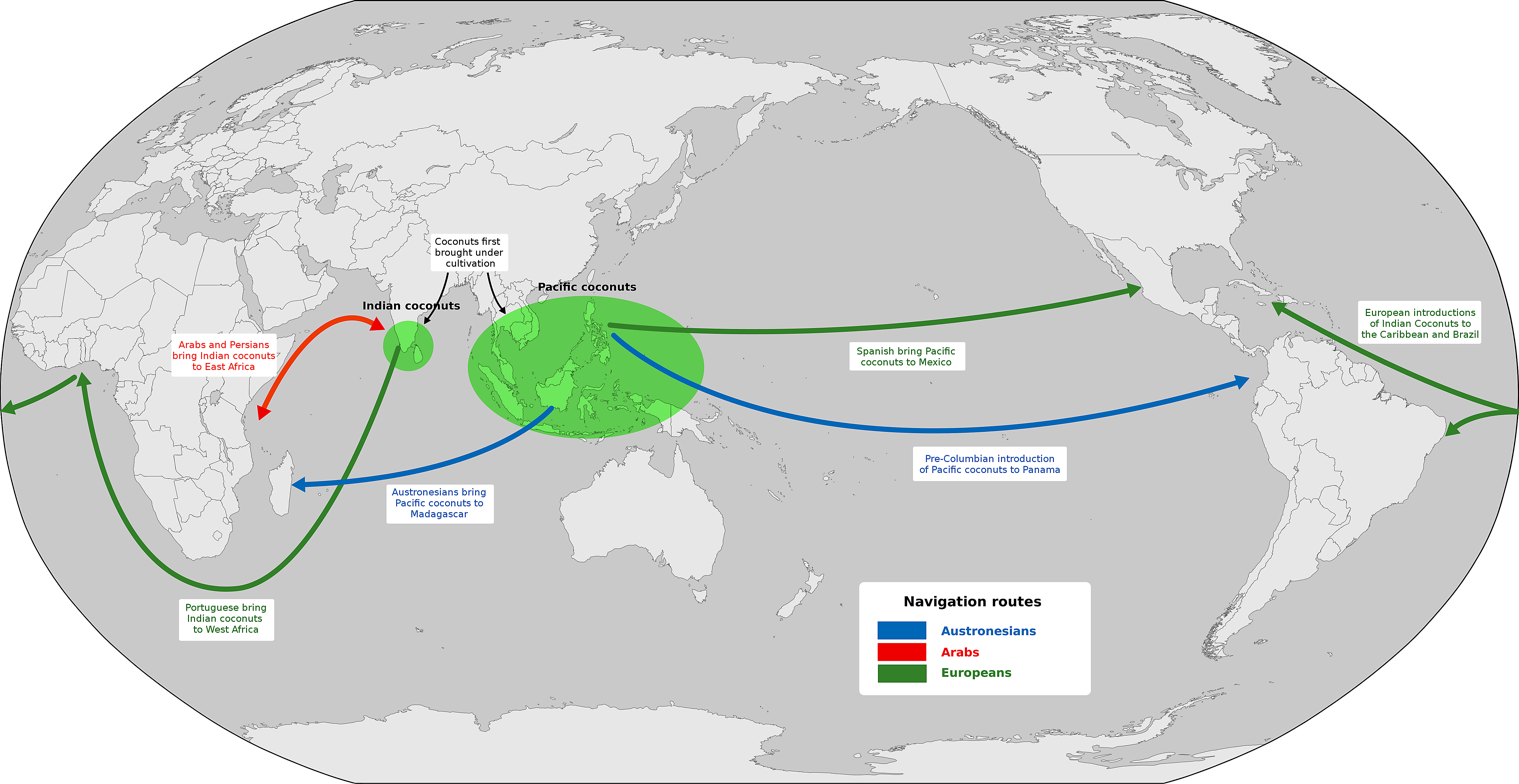
Inferred historical introduction of coconuts from the original centers of diversity in the Indian subcontinent and Maritime Southeast Asia

The region between Southwest Asia and Melanesia is the center of origin for coconuts (Cocos nucifera), where it shows greatest genetic diversity. A study in 2011 identified two highly genetically differentiated subpopulations of coconuts, one originating from Maritime Southeast Asia (the Pacific group) and the other from the southern margins of the Indian subcontinent (the Indo-Atlantic group). The Pacific group is the only one to display clear genetic and phenotypic indications that they were domesticated; including dwarf habit, self-pollination, and the round "niu vai" fruit morphology with larger endosperm-to-husk ratios. The distribution of the Pacific coconuts correspond to the regions settled by Austronesian voyagers indicating that its spread was largely the result of human introductions.

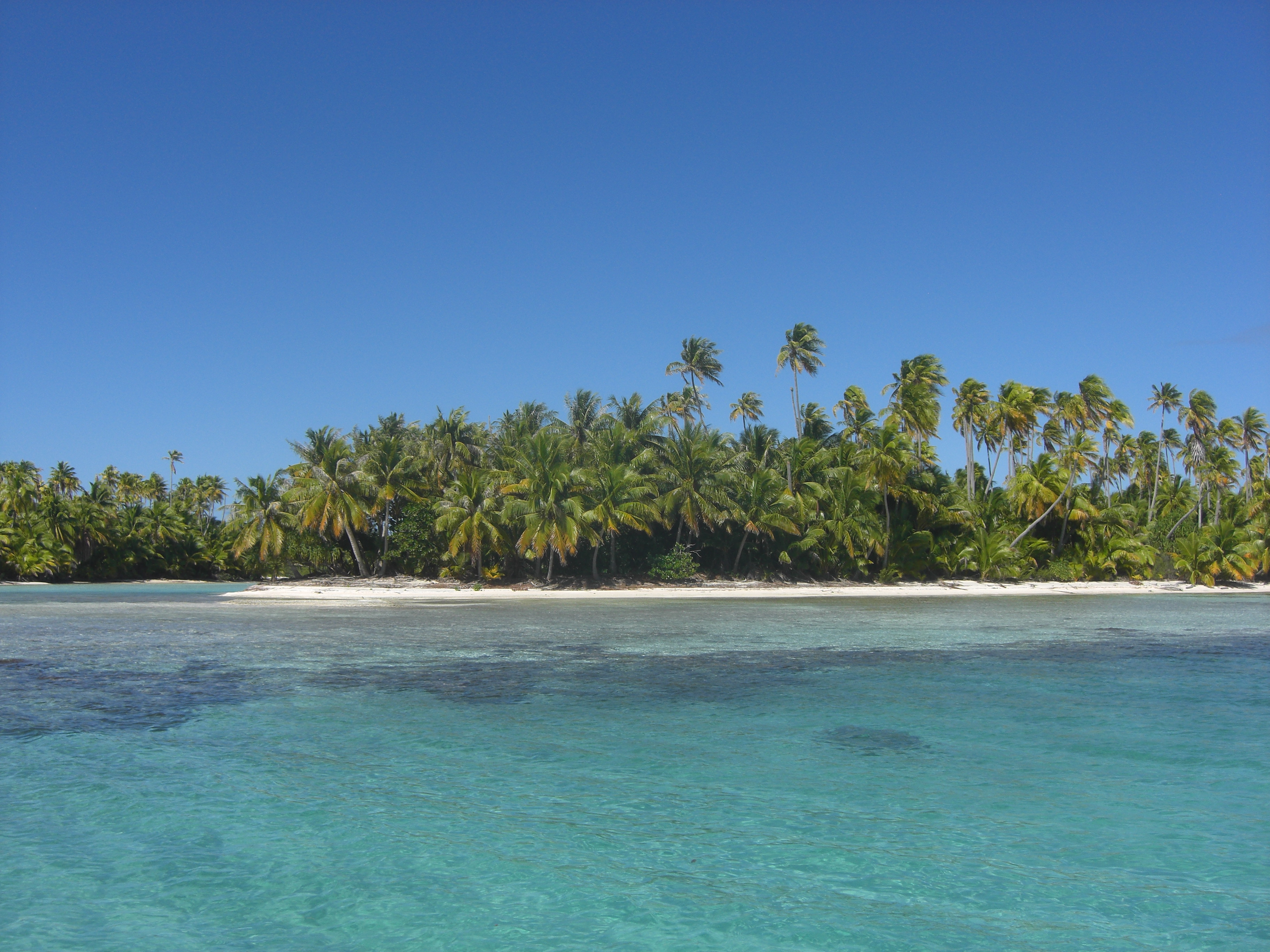
Coconuts in Rangiroa in the Tuamotus, French Polynesia

It is most strikingly displayed in Madagascar, an island settled by Austronesian sailors at around 2,000 to 1,500 BP. The coconut populations in the island show genetic admixture between the two subpopulations indicating that Pacific coconuts were brought by the Austronesian settlers that later interbred with the local Indo-Atlantic coconuts.

Most words for "coconut" in Austronesian languages are derived from proto-Malayo-Polynesian *niuʀ. Modern cognates include Tagalog niyog; Chamorro niyok; Malay nyiur or nyior; Tetum nuu; Drehu nu; Gilbertese nii; Hawaiian, Samoan, Tongan, Fijian, and Rapa Nui niu; and Malagasy nio.

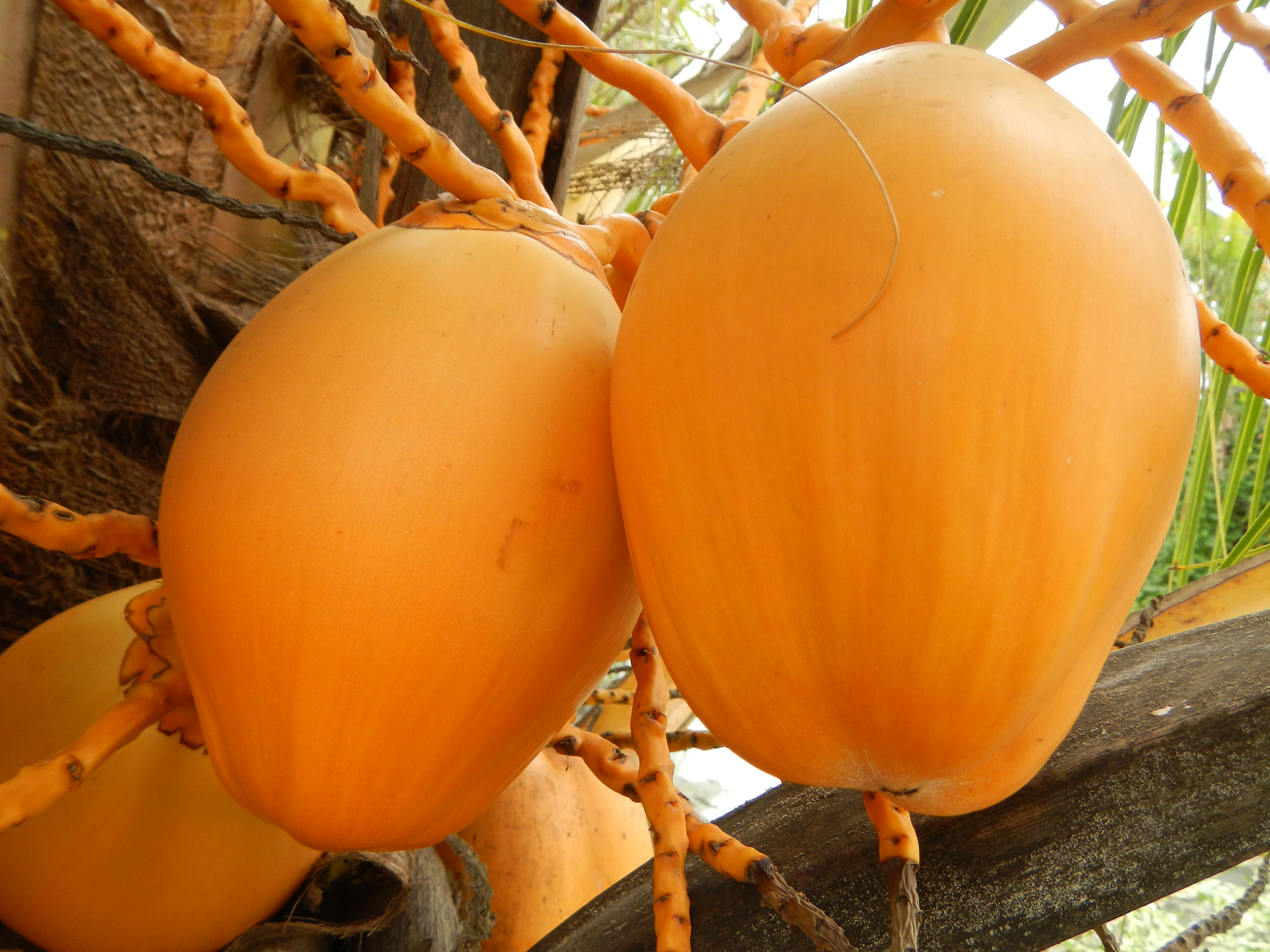
Dwarf coconut in Luzon, showing the typical rounder niu vai fruit morphology of Pacific coconuts

Genetic studies of coconuts have also confirmed pre-Columbian populations of coconuts in Panama in South America. However, it is not native and display a genetic bottleneck resulting from a founder effect. A study in 2008 showed that the coconuts in the Americas are genetically closest related to coconuts in the Philippines, and not to any other nearby coconut populations (including Polynesia). Such an origin indicates that the coconuts were not introduced naturally, such as by sea currents. The researchers concluded that it was brought by early Austronesian sailors to the Americas from at least 2,250 BP, and may be proof of pre-Columbian contact between Austronesian cultures and South American cultures, albeit in the opposite direction than what early hypotheses like Heyerdahl's had proposed. It is further strengthened by other similar botanical evidence of contact, like the pre-colonial presence of sweet potato in Oceanian cultures. During the colonial era, Pacific coconuts were further introduced to Mexico from the Spanish East Indies via the Manila galleons.

In contrast to the Pacific coconuts, Indo-Atlantic coconuts were largely spread by Arab and Persian traders into the East African coast. Indo-Atlantic coconuts were also introduced into the Atlantic Ocean by Portuguese ships from their colonies in coastal India and Sri Lanka; first being introduced to coastal West Africa, then onwards into the Caribbean and the east coast of Brazil. All of these introductions are within the last few centuries, relatively recent in comparison to the spread of Pacific coconuts.

=== Coix lacryma-jobi (Job's tears) ===
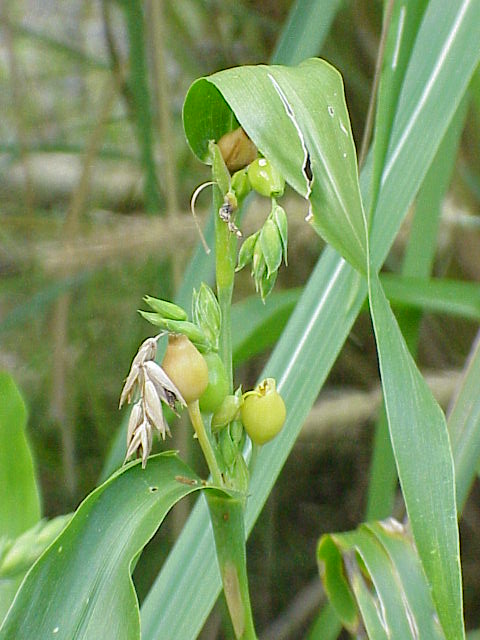
Job's tears with developing seed pods

The size and nutrition of Job's tears set it apart from other long-used ancient grains native to this area of Asia, and the well established and recorded use in culinary practices indicate a history at least proportional to that of millet and rice. Dating of a site in Shizitan has presented dates as early as 28,000 to 18,000 years ago. Archaeologists have found evidence supporting Job's tears as among the earliest domesticates in Asia, accompanied by millet.

=== Colocasia esculenta (taro) ===
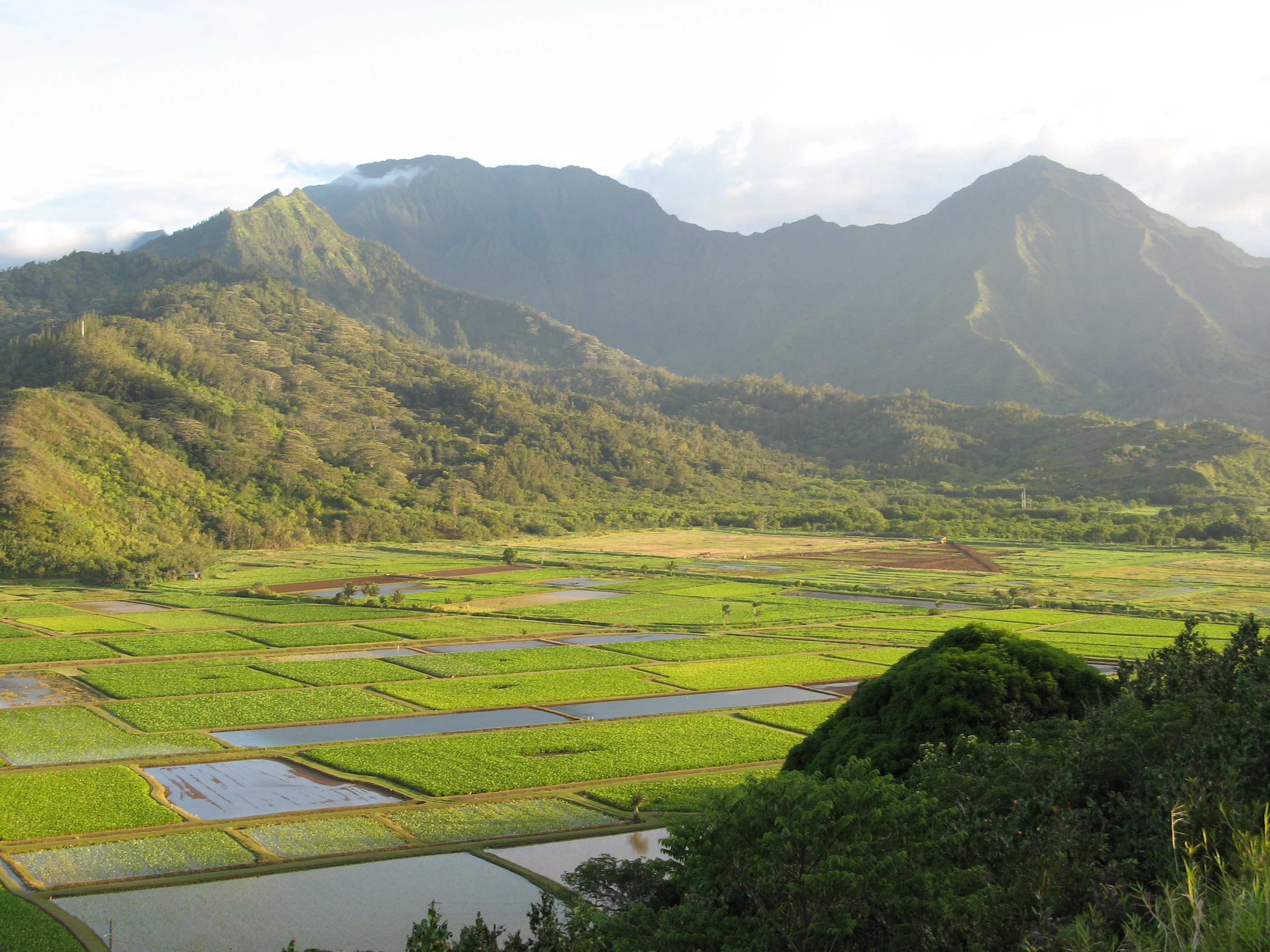
Taro fields in Hanalei Valley, Kauaʻi

The taro (Colocasia esculenta), sometimes referred to as the "true taro", is one of the most ancient cultivated crops and pre-dated the Austronesian expansion. Taro is found widely in tropical and subtropical regions of South Asia, East Asia, Southeast Asia, Papua New Guinea, and northern Australia and is highly polymorphic, making taxonomy and distinction between wild and cultivated types difficult. It is believed that they were domesticated independently multiple times, with authors giving possible locations as New Guinea, Mainland Southeast Asia, and northeastern India, based largely on the assumed native range of the wild plants. However, more recent studies have pointed out that wild taro may have a much larger native distribution than previously believed, and wild breeding types may also likely be indigenous to other parts of Maritime Southeast Asia.

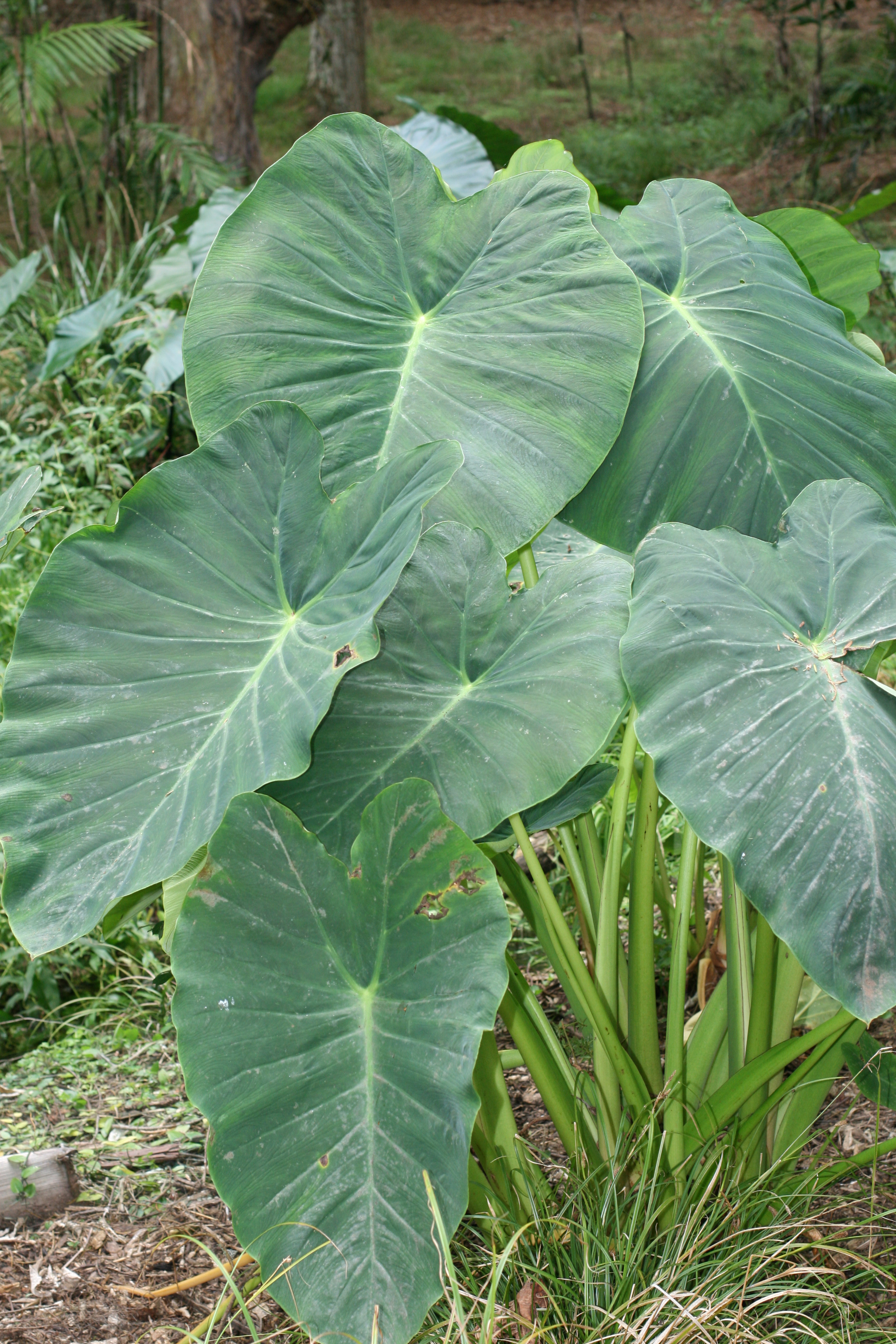
Taro plants in Auckland, New Zealand

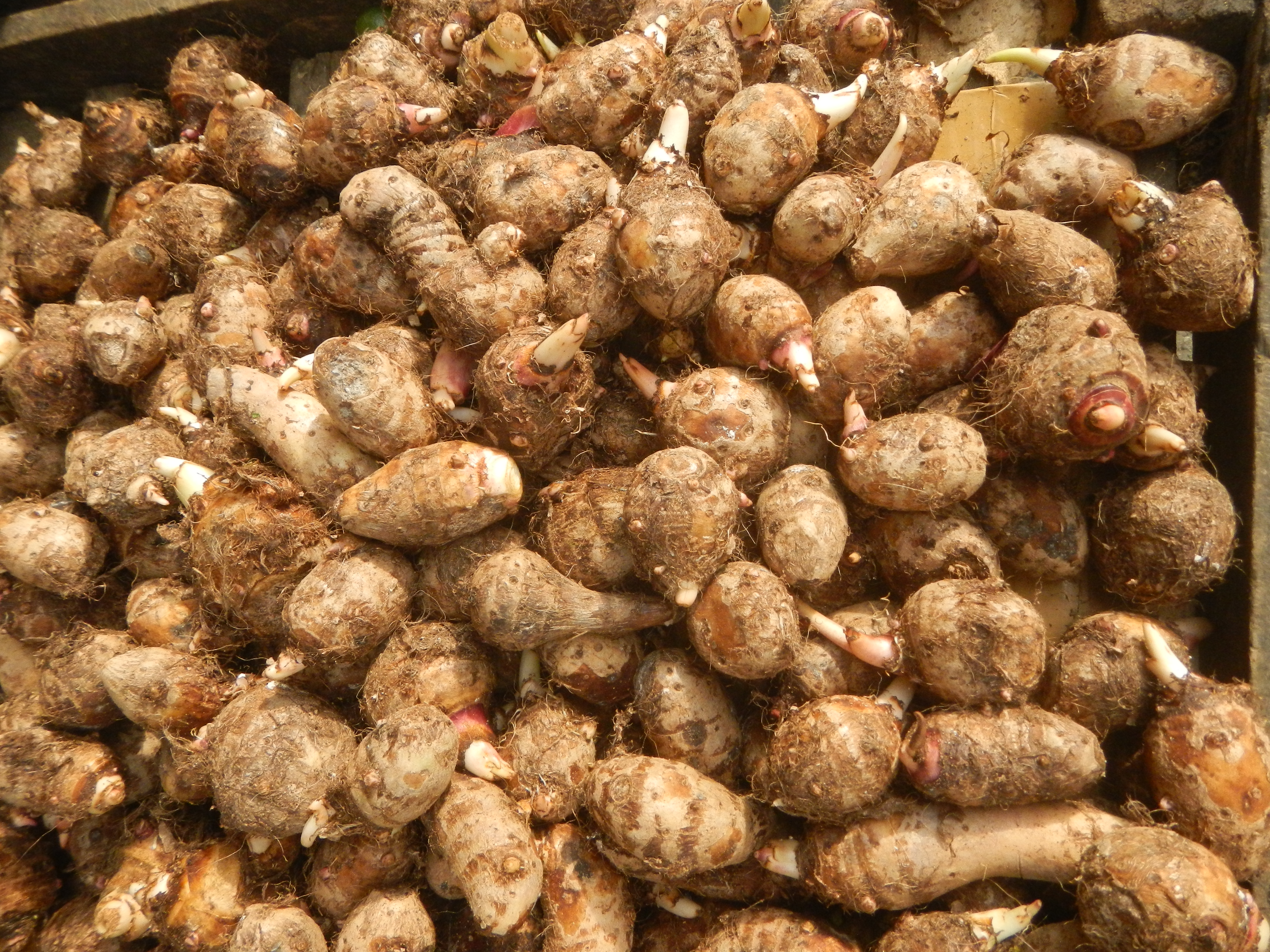
Taro corms being sold in the Philippines

Archaeological traces of taro exploitation have been recovered from numerous sites pre-dating the Austronesian expansion, though whether these were cultivated or wild types can not be ascertained. They include the Niah Caves of Borneo, dating to <40,000 BP; Ille Cave of Palawan, dated to at least c. 11,000 BP; Kuk Swamp of New Guinea, dated to 10,200 to 9,910 cal BP; and Kilu Cave in the Solomon Islands dated to around c. 28,000 to 20,000 BP. In the case of Kuk Swamp, there is evidence of formalized agriculture emerging by about c. 10,000 BP, with evidence of cultivated plots, though which plant was cultivated remains unknown.

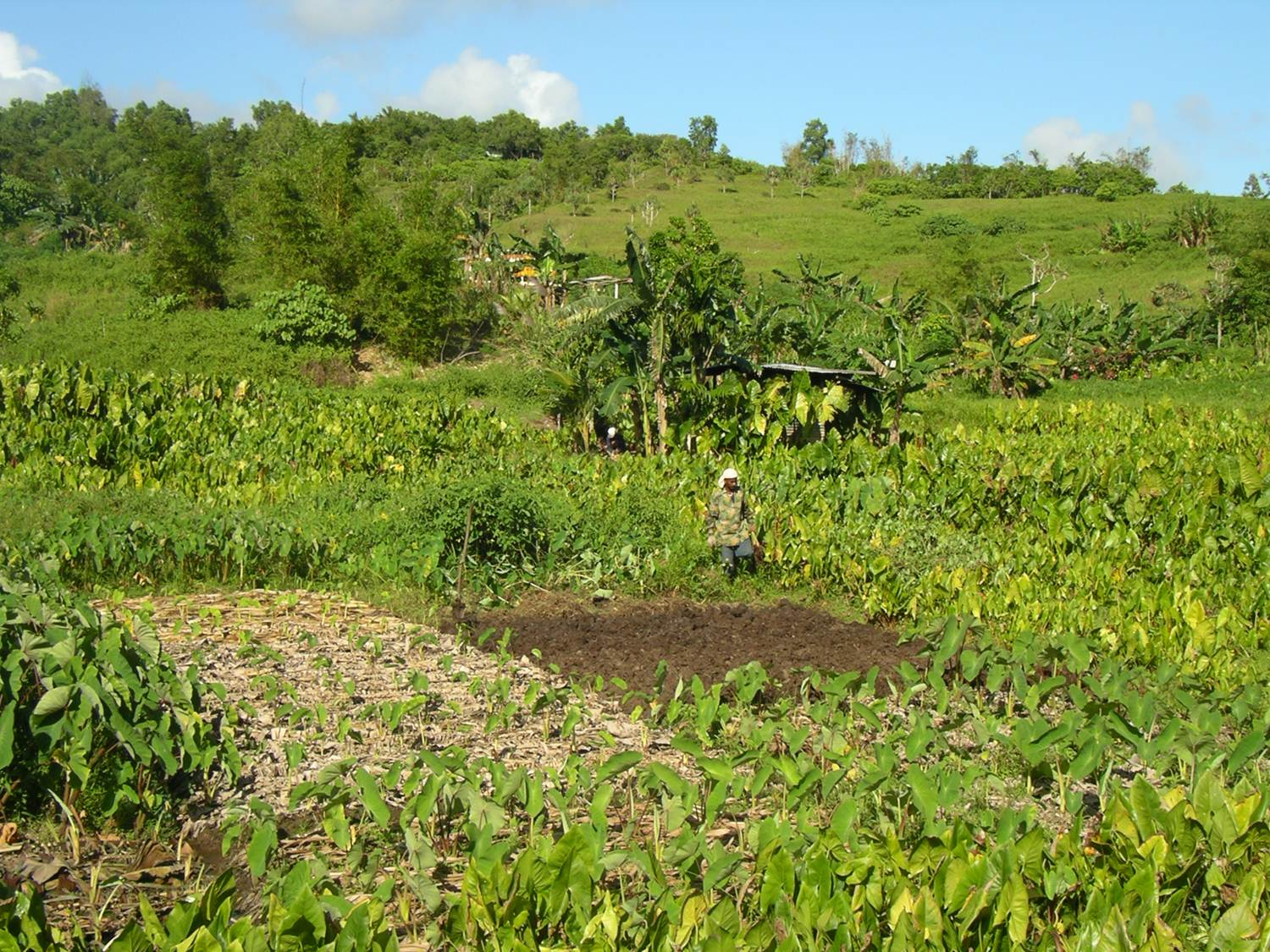
A taro plantation in Palau using dug pits and compost to create richer soil

Regardless, taro were definitely among the cultivated plants of Austronesians as well as preceding populations in Maritime Southeast Asia. However, their importance in Maritime Southeast Asia had largely been replaced by rice, although they are still planted at the margins of rice paddies in some communities. They remained a staple in the islands of Melanesia and Polynesia where rice wasn't introduced. They are one of the four species of aroids (taros) cultivated by Austronesians primarily as a source of starchy corms, the others being Alocasia macrorrhizos, Amorphophallus paeoniifolius, and Cyrtosperma merkusii. They are the most important and the most preferred among the four, because they were less likely to contain the irritating raphides present in the other plants.

Taro is also identified as one of the staples of Micronesia, from archaeological evidence dating back to the pre-colonial Latte Period (c. 900 – 1521 AD), indicating that it was also carried by Micronesians when they colonized the islands. Due to the unsuitability of the low-lying atoll islands of most of Micronesia, Micronesians innovated by digging pits that could then be filled up with compost suitable for taro cultivation. Taro pollen and starch residue have also been identified in earlier Lapita sites, dated to around c. 3,050 – 2,500 cal BP.

There are numerous terms for taro in the Austronesian languages, both specific and generalized. The reconstructed Proto-Austronesian term for taro is *cali, with cognates in Formosan languages including Seediq sali, Thao lhari; Bunun tai; and Amis tali.

It became *taləs in Proto-Malayo-Polynesian, which in turn became *talos or *talo in Proto-Oceanic. Modern cognates include Hanunó'o tálus; Aborlan Tagbanwa talis; Palawan Batak täläs; Nias talõ; Malay talas; Minangkabau taleh; Rejang and Sundanese taleus; Javanese tales; Palauan dáit; Rotinese tale; and Tetun talas. In Polynesian languages, the cognates include Motu, Marovo, Tongan, Samoan, Niue, Futunan, Tuvaluan talo; Kwaio, Lau (Malaita), and Toqabaqita alo; 'Āre'āre, Arosi, and Bauro aro; Nakanamanga na-tale; Sye tal or nal; Fijian and Nukuoro dalo; Rennellese tago; Anuta, Rarotongan, and Māori taro; and Hawaiian kalo. The English name for the plant is itself derived from the Polynesian names. A red variety of taro also has names derived from reconstructed Proto-Polynesian *pongi, with cognates including Niue pongi; Marquesan poki; Hawaiian poni; and Māori pongi.

In Proto-Western-Malayo-Polynesian, another reconstructed term is *kaladi, with cognates including Agutaynen, Sabah Bisaya, Iban, Tae', and Wolio kaladi; Balinese and Malay keladi; and Mongondow koladi.

=== Cordia subcordata (beach cordia) ===
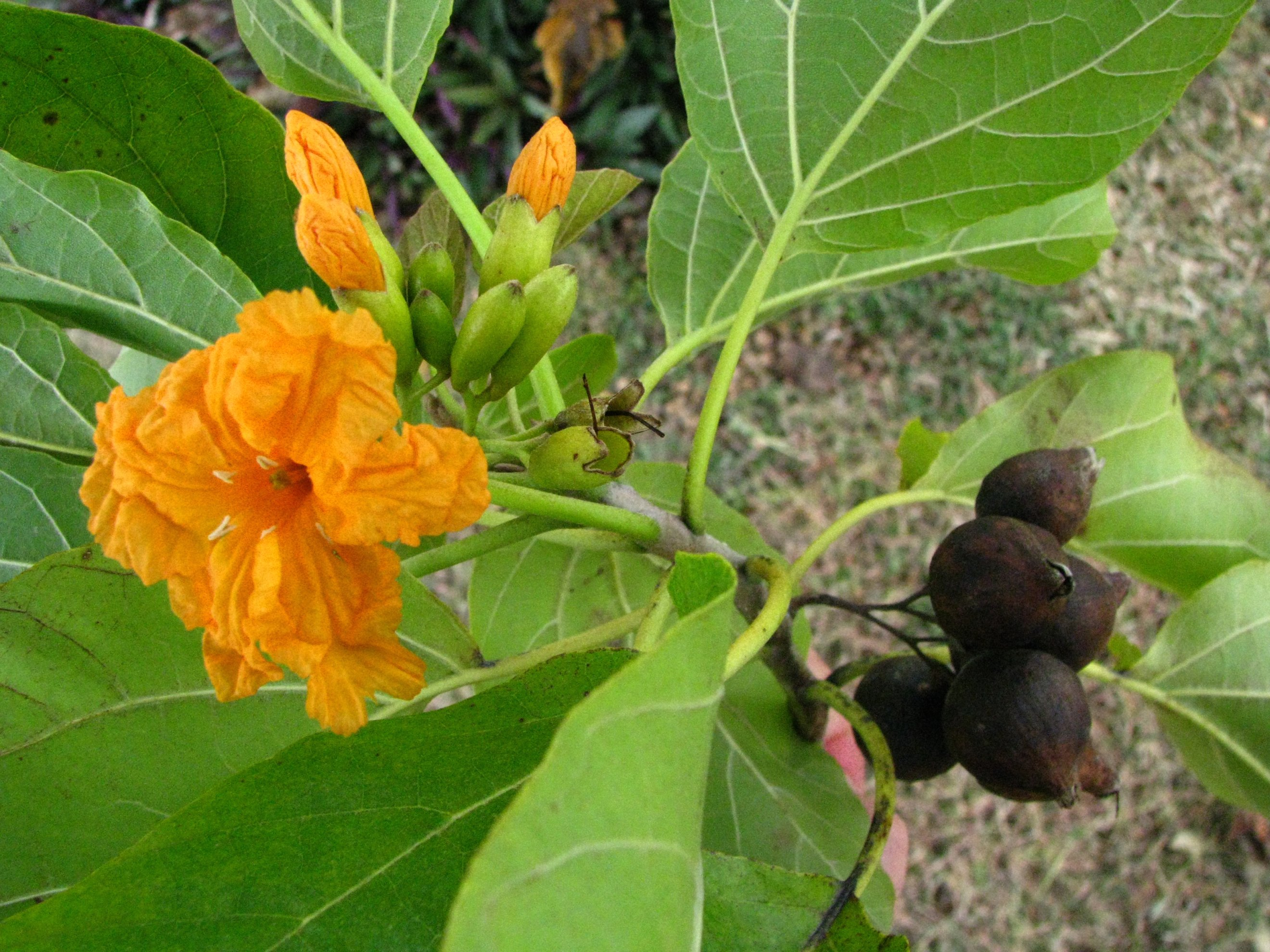
Flowering beach cordia in Oʻahu

The beach cordia (Cordia subcordata) is an important timber tree with light, finely textured, and somewhat soft wood ideal for carving. It has no taste and thus was most commonly used for carving utensils, cups, bowls, and other containers; as well as ornamental carvings and musical instruments throughout Austronesia. The wood is flammable and is commonly used in New Guinea as firewood. In some cultures, the wood may also be used to build paddles and the keels of the boats. The seeds can also be eaten, though only as famine food. Other parts can also be used for traditional medicine and for the extraction of dyes. Like Calophyllum inophyllum, beach cordia were commonly planted in marae. They have cultural and religious significance in some cultures like in Kiribati and the Karimunjawa Islands of Indonesia. In Hawaii, it was traditional to plant beach cordia around houses and use their bright orange flowers as leis.

Beach cordia, like most trees favored by Austronesians, grow well in sandy, clay, and rocky soil and are a common component in coastal forests and mangrove forests. Beach cordia was once thought to be an introduced species, but it is now known to be indigenous to most of the islands and coastlines of the Indo-Pacific, propagated naturally by their buoyant seeds. Nevertheless, they were still deliberately introduced in some islands, with artificial introductions usually found growing with other common trees cultivated by Austronesians. Especially in the atolls of Micronesia.

Terms for beach cordia is reconstructed to Proto-Malayo-Polynesian *kanawa, with cognates including Iban kenawa; Makasarese kanawa; Palauan kəláu; Gilbertese kanawa; Tokelau kanava; and Nukuoro ganava.

Another set of cognates can be reconstructed to Proto-Oceanic *toRu, with cognates including Nehan to-tor; Petats to-tol; Fijian, Tongan, and Rarotongan tou; and Hawaiian kou.

An older reconstructed term is Proto-Austronesian *qaNuNaŋ, however it is not specific to beach cordia and can refer to other members of the genus with sticky fruits, especially the glue berry (Cordia dichotoma) and the lasura (Cordia myxa). It also did not reach the Oceanic languages. Cognates include Tsou həhngə; Isneg anúnang; Hanunó'o and Cebuano anúnang; Maranao nonang; Manobo enunang; Mansaka anonang; Malay, Minangkabau, Sasak, Manggarai, and Rembong nunang; and Mongondow onunang.

=== Cordyline fruticosa (ti) ===
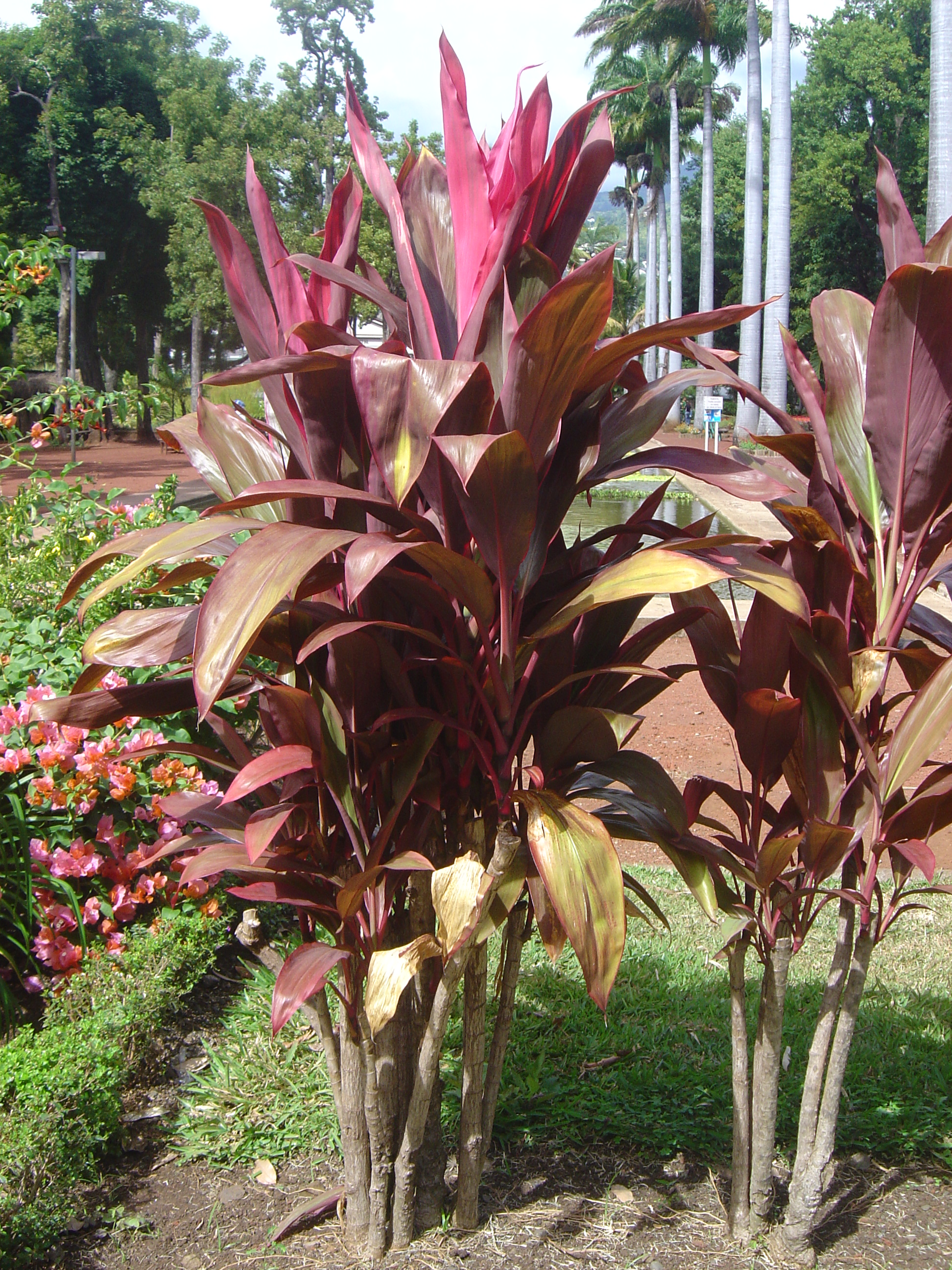
Red ti plants in Réunion

Ti (Cordyline fruticosa) is a palm-like plant growing up to 3 to 4 m (9.8 to 13.1 ft) tall with an attractive fan-like and spirally arranged cluster of broadly elongated leaves at the tip of the slender trunk. It has numerous color variations, ranging from plants with red leaves to green, yellow, and variegated cultivars. Its original native distribution is unknown, but it is believed to be native to the region from Bangladesh, to Mainland Southeast Asia, South China, Taiwan, Maritime Southeast Asia, New Guinea, and Northern Australia. It has the highest morphological diversity in New Guinea and is believed to have been extensively cultivated there. It is commonly misidentified as a "Dracaena", along with members of the genus Cordyline, due to past classification systems.

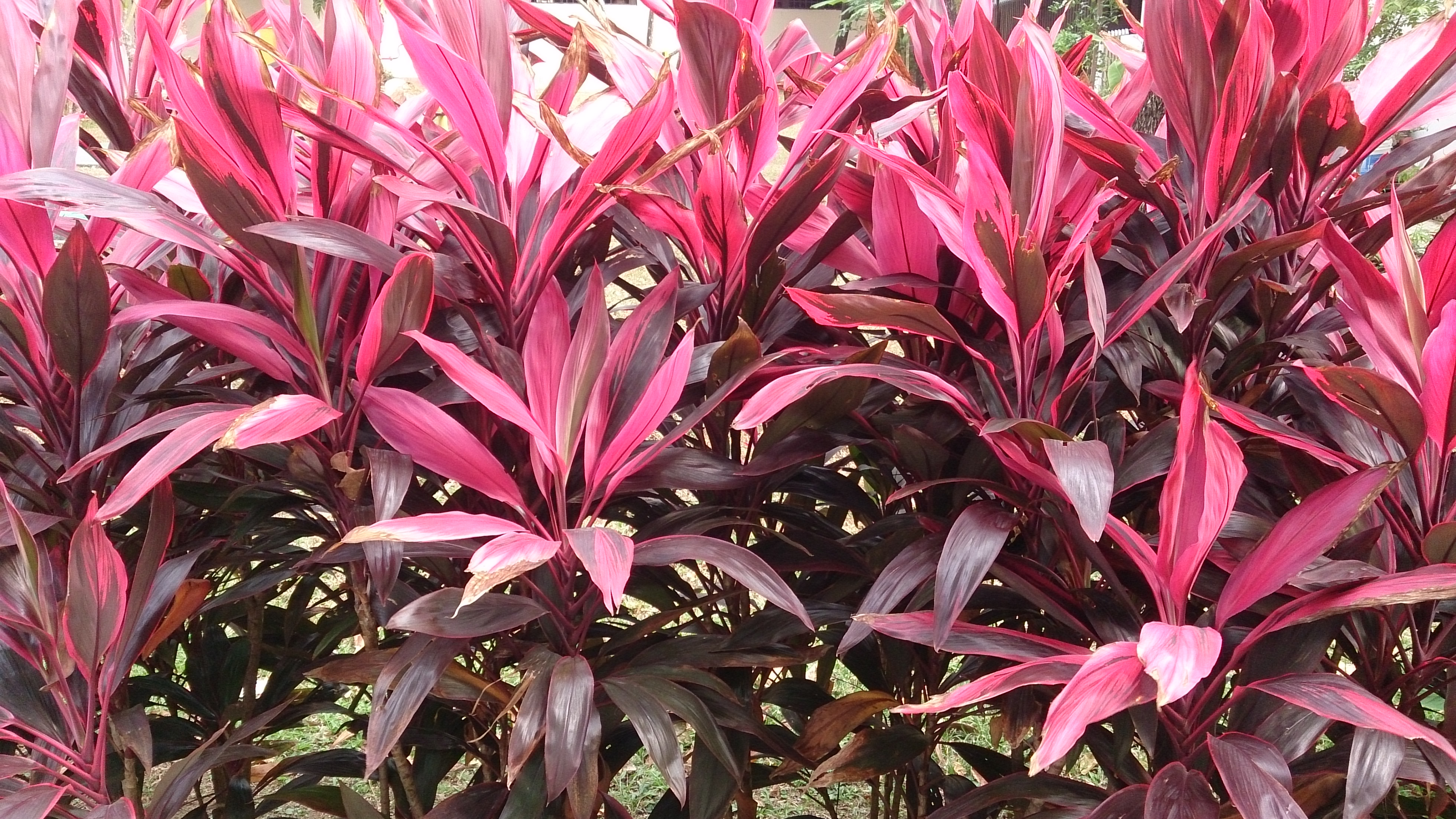
Red ti in Singapore

It was carried throughout Oceania by Austronesians, reaching as far as Hawaii, New Zealand, and Easter Island at their furthest extent. A particularly important type of ti in Polynesia is a large green-leafed cultivar grown for their enlarged edible rhizomes. Unlike the ti populations in Southeast Asia and Near Oceania, this cultivar is almost entirely sterile in the further islands of eastern Polynesia. It can only be propagated by cuttings from the stalks or the rhizomes. It is speculated that this was the result of deliberate artificial selection, probably because they produce larger and less fibrous rhizomes more suitable for use as food.

Ti has many uses but it is most notable as one of the most important plants related to the indigenous animist religions of Austronesians, along with fig trees (Ficus spp.). It is very widely regarded as having mystical or spiritual powers in various Austronesian (as well as Papuan) cultures. Among a lot of ethnic groups in Austronesia it is regarded as sacred. Common features include the belief that they can hold souls and thus are useful in healing "soul loss" illnesses and in exorcising against malevolent spirits, their use in ritual attire and ornamentation, and their use as boundary markers. Red and green cultivars also commonly represented dualistic aspects of culture and religion and are used differently in rituals. Red ti plants commonly symbolize blood, war, and the ties between the living and the dead; while green ti plants commonly symbolize peace and healing. They are also widely used for traditional medicine, dye, and ornamentation throughout Austronesia and New Guinea. Their ritual uses in Maritime Southeast Asia have largely been obscured by the introduction of Hinduism, Buddhism, Islamic, and Christian religions, but they still persist in certain areas or are coopted for the rituals of the new religions.

In Polynesia, the leaves of the green-leafed form are used to wrap food, line earth ovens and fermentation pits of breadfruit, and their rhizomes harvested and processed into a sweet molasses-like pulp eaten like candy or used to produce a honey-like liquid used in various sweet treats. In Hawaii, the roots are also mixed with water and fermented into an alcoholic beverage known as okolehao. The consumption of ti as food, regarded as a sacred plant and thus was originally taboo, is believed to have been a daring innovation of Polynesian cultures as a response to famine conditions. The lifting of the taboo is believed to be tied to the development of the firewalking ritual.

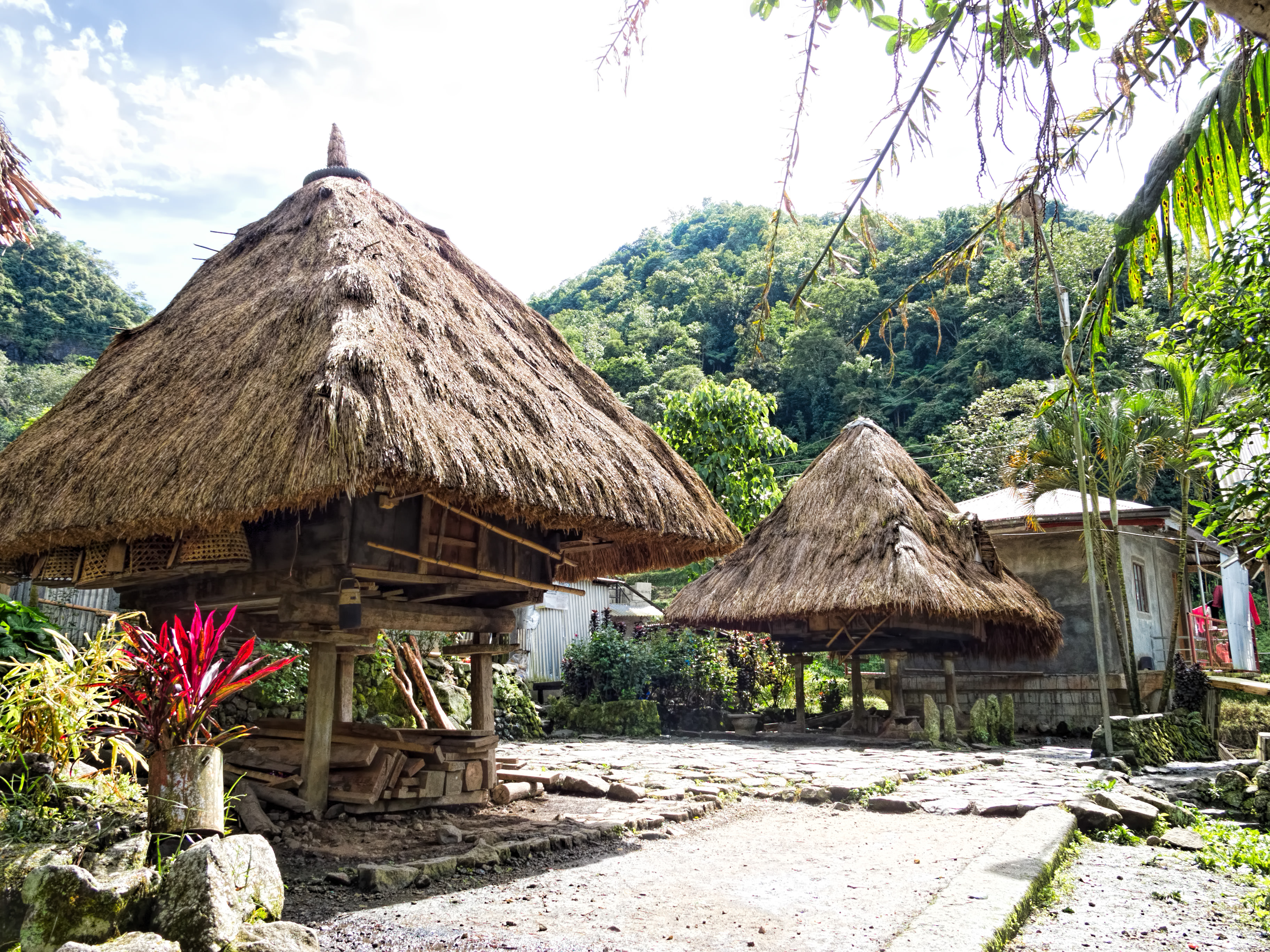
Red ti planted alongside traditional houses of the Ifugao people in the Banaue Rice Terraces, Philippines

In Philippine anitism, ti were commonly used by babaylan (female shamans) when conducting mediumship or healing rituals. A common belief in Filipino cultures is that the plant has the innate ability to host spirits. Among the Ifugao people of Northern Luzon, it is planted around terraces and communities to drive away evil spirits as well as mark boundaries of cultivated fields. The red leaves are believed to be attractive to spirits and is worn during important rituals as part of the headdresses and tucked into armbands. In the past, it was also worn during ceremonial dances called bangibang, which was performed by both men and women for warriors who died in battle or through violent means. They are also used to decorate ritual objects. Among the Palaw'an people, it is planted in burial grounds to prevent the dead from becoming malevolent spirits.

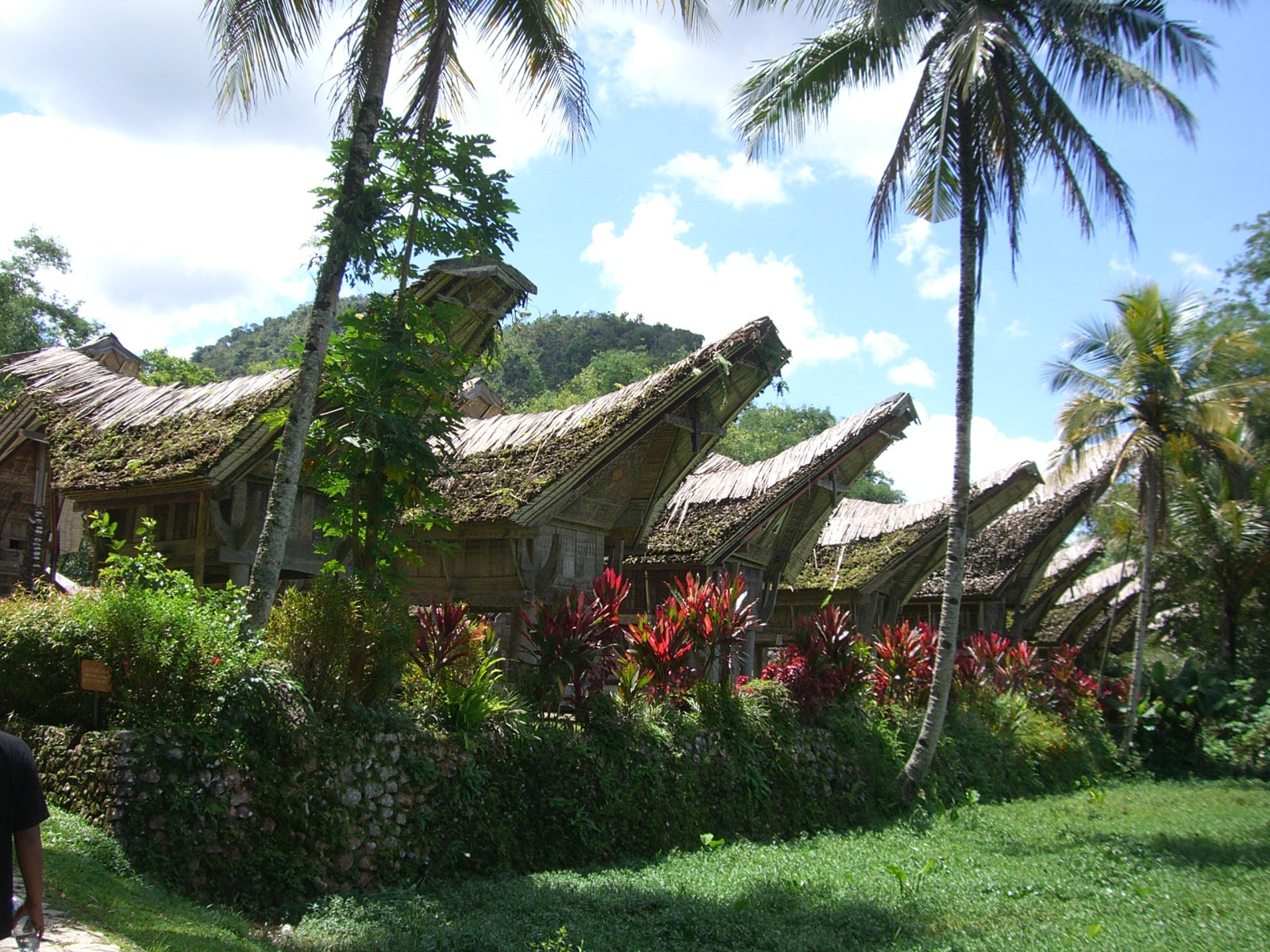
Red ti planted around traditional Toraja houses in Tana Toraja, Sulawesi

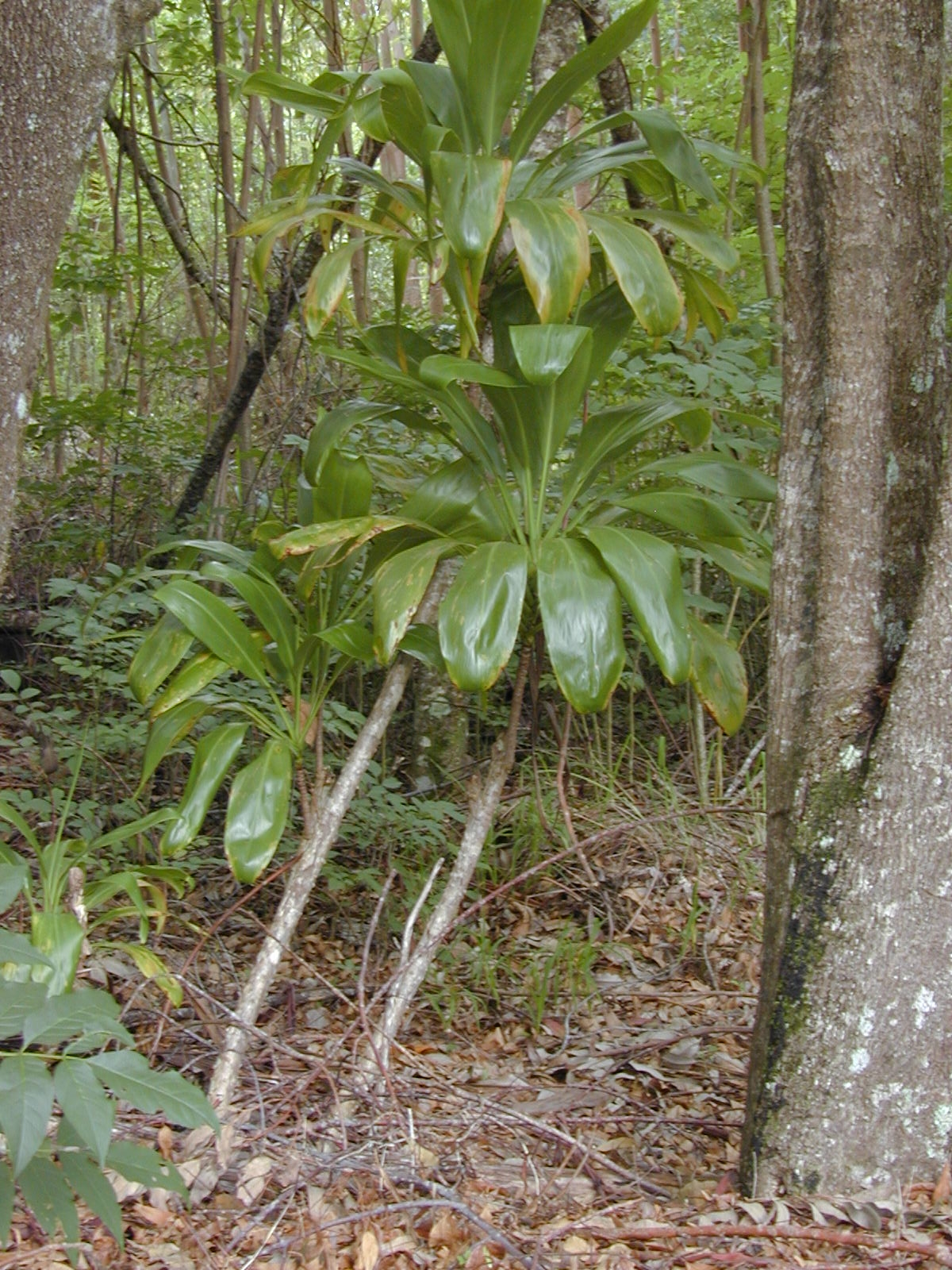
Feral green ti plants in Makawao Forest, Maui

In Indonesia, red ti are used similarly as in the Philippines. Among the Dayak, Sundanese, Kayan, Kenyah, Berawan, Iban and Mongondow people, red ti are used as wards against evil spirits and as boundary markers. They are also used in rituals like in healing and funerals and are very commonly planted in sacred groves and around shrines. The Dayak also extract a natural green dye from ti. During healing rituals of the Mentawai people, the life-giving spirit are enticed with songs and offerings to enter ti stems which are then reconciled with the sick person. Among the Sasak people, green ti leaves are used as part of the offerings to spirits by the belian shamans. Among the Baduy people, green ti represent the body, while red ti represent the soul. Both are used in rice planting rituals. They are also planted on burial grounds. Among the Balinese and Karo people, ti plants are planted near village or family shrines in a sacred grove. Among the Toraja people, red ti plants are used in rituals and as decorations of ritual objects. They are believed to occur in both the material and the spirit worlds (a common belief in Austronesian animism). In the spirit world, they exist as fins and tails of spirits. In the material world, they are most useful as guides used to attract the attentions of spirits. The red leaves are also symbolic of blood and thus of life and vitality. Among the Ngaju people, ti plants were symbolic of the sacred groves of ancestors. They were also important in ritual promises dedicated to high gods. They were regarded as symbolic of the masculine "Tree of Life", in a dichotomy against Ficus species which symbolize the feminine "Tree of the Dead".

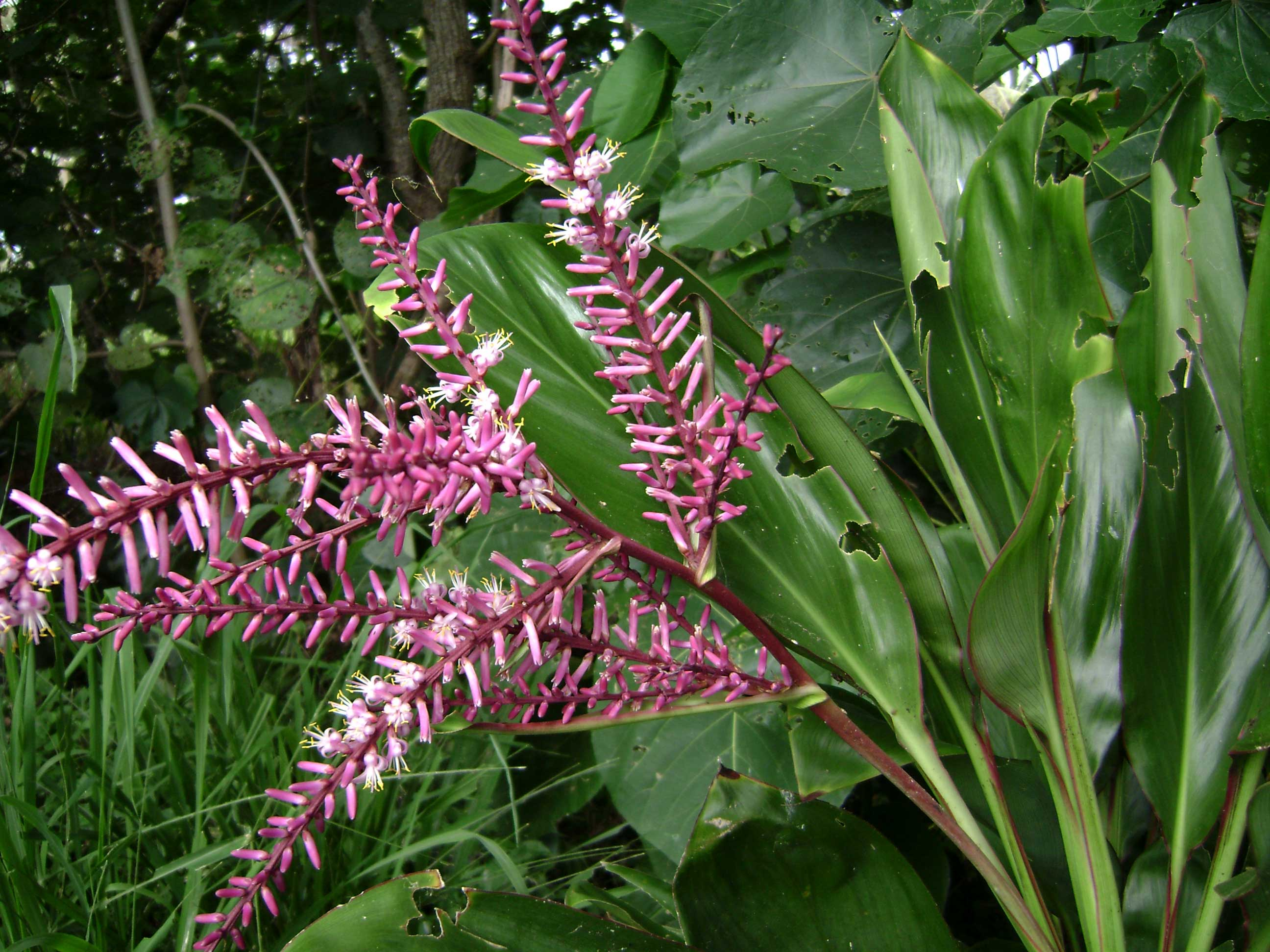
Flowering green ti plant in Tonga

In New Guinea, ti are commonly planted to indicate land ownership for cultivation and are also planted around ceremonial men's houses. They are also used in various rituals and are commonly associated with blood and warfare. Among the Tsembaga Maring people, they are believed to house "red spirits" (spirits of men who died in battle). Prior to a highly ritualized (but lethal) warfare over land ownership, they are uprooted and pigs are sacrificed to the spirits. After the hostilities, they are re-planted in the new land boundaries depending on the outcome of the fight. The men involved ritually place their souls into the plants. The ritual warfare have been suppressed by the Papua New Guinea government, but parts of the rituals still survive. Among the Ankave people, red ti is part of their creation myth, believed as having arisen from the site of the first murder. Among the Mendi and Sulka people they are made into dyes used as body paint, and their leaves are used for body adornments and purification rituals. Among the Nikgini people, the leaves have magical abilities to bring good luck and are used in divination and in decorating ritual objects. Among the Kapauku people, ti plants are regarded as magical plants and are believed to be spiritual beings themselves. Unlike other magical plants which are controlled by other spirits, ti plants had their own spirits and are powerful enough to command other spiritual beings. Red plants are used in white magic rituals, while green plants are used in black magic rituals. They are also commonly used in protection and warding rituals. Among the Baktaman people, red plants are used for initiation rites, while green plants are used for healing. The Ok-speaking peoples also regard ti plants as their collective totem.

In Island Melanesia, ti are regarded as sacred by various Austronesian-speaking peoples and are used in rituals for protection, divination, and fertility. Among the Kwaio people, red ti are associated with feuding and vengeance, while green ti are associated with ancestor spirits, markers of sacred groves, and wards against evil. The Kwaio cultivate these varieties around their communities. Among the Maenge people of New Britain, ti leaves are worn as everyday skirts by women. The color and size of leaves can vary by personal preference and fashion. New cultivars with different colors are traded regularly and strands of ti are grown near the village. Red leaves can only be worn by women past puberty. Ti is also the most important plant in magic and healing rituals of the Maenge. Some ti cultivars are associated with supernatural spirits and have names and folklore around them. In Vanuatu, Cordyline leaves, known locally by the Bislama name nanggaria, are worn tucked into a belt in traditional dances like Māʻuluʻulu, with different varieties having particular symbolic meanings. Cordylines are often planted outside nakamal buildings. In Fiji, red ti leaves are used as skirts for dancers and are used in rituals dedicated to the spirits of the dead. They are also planted around ceremonial buildings used for initiation rituals.

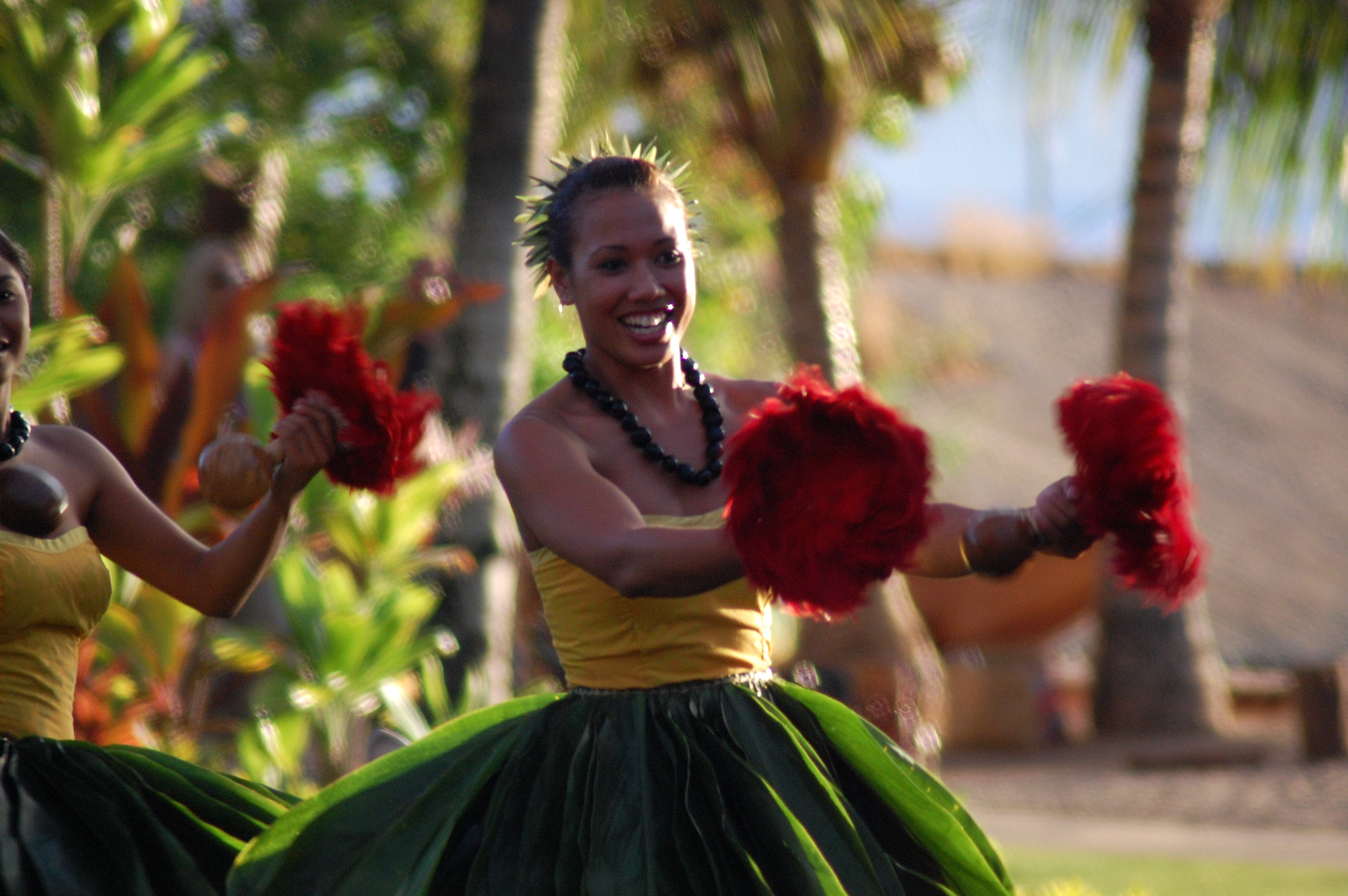
Hula dancers in a Luau in Lāhainā, in traditional kī leaf skirts

In Micronesia, ti leaves are buried under newly built houses in Pohnpei to ward off malign sorcery. In instances of an unknown death, shamans in Micronesia communicate with the dead spirit through ti plants, naming various causes of death until the plant trembles. There is also archaeological evidence that the rhizomes of the plants were eaten in the past in Guam prior to the Latte Period.

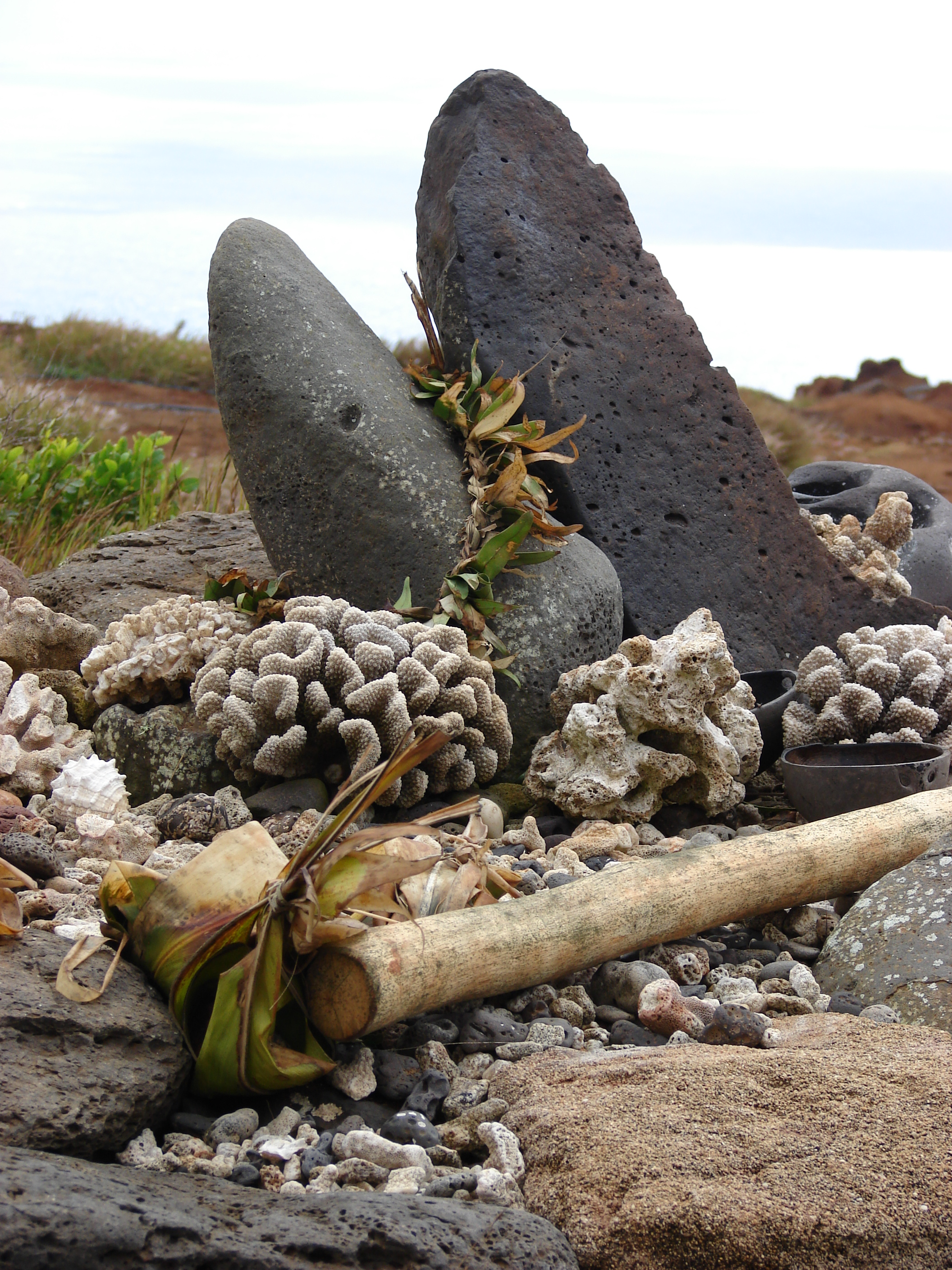
Offerings of stone and bundles of tī leaves (puʻolo) in the Puʻu Moaulanui heiau (temple) in the summit of Kahoʻolawe, Hawaii

In Polynesia, green ti were cultivated widely for food and religious purposes. They are commonly planted around homes, in sacred places (including marae and heiau), and in grave sites. The leaves are also carried as a charm when traveling and the leaves are used in rituals that communicate with the species. Like in Southeast Asia, they are widely believed to protect against evil spirits and bad luck; as well as having the ability to host spirits of dead people, as well as nature spirits.

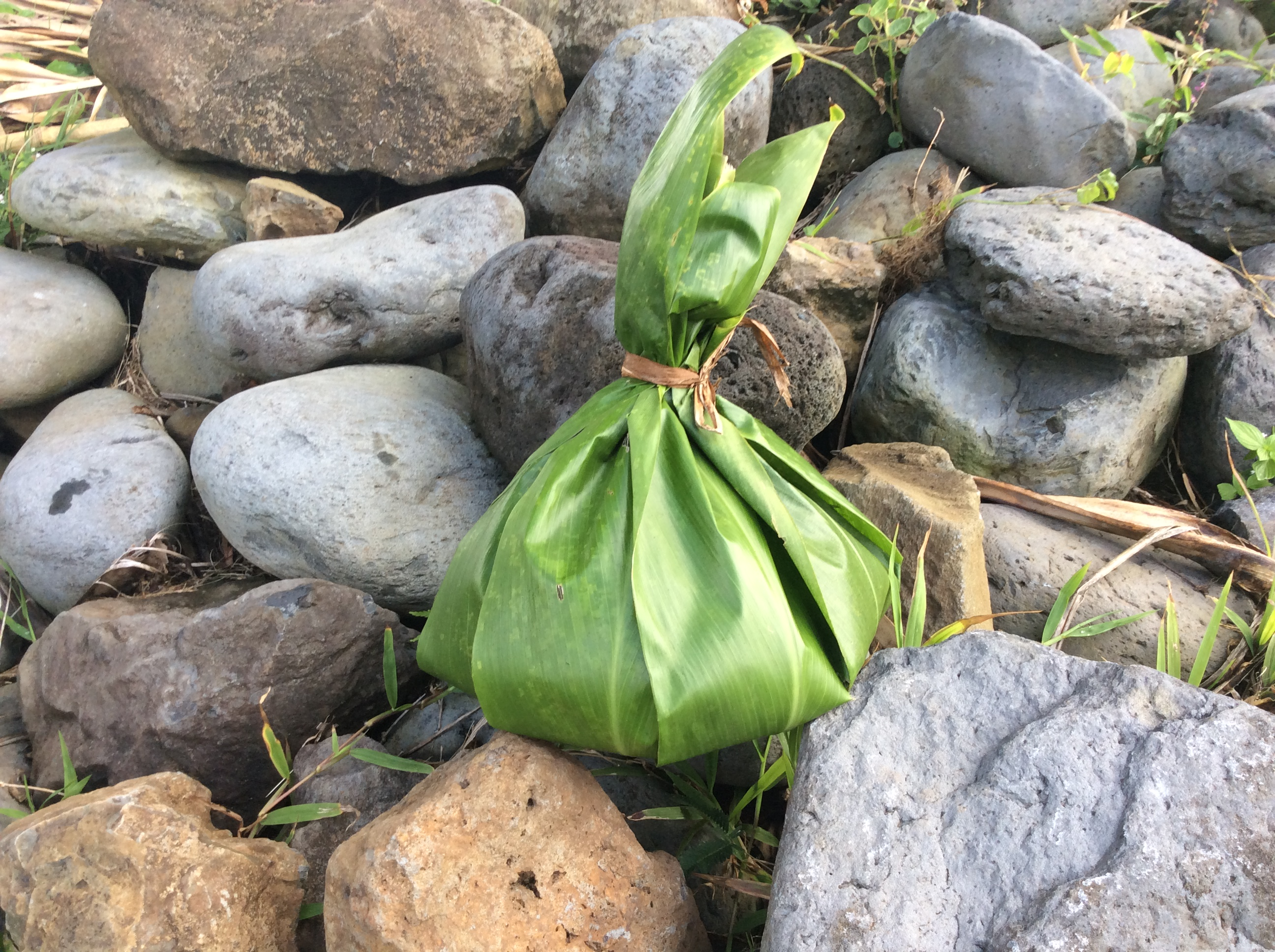
Ti leaf bundles (puʻolo) used as offerings to spirits in Hawaii

In ancient Hawaiʻi the plant was thought to have great spiritual power; only kahuna (shamans) and aliʻi (chiefs) were able to wear leaves around their necks during certain ritual activities. Ti was sacred to the god of fertility and agriculture Lono, and the goddess of the forest and the hula dance, Laka. Ti leaves were also used to make lei, and to outline borders between properties. It was also planted at the corners of the home to keep evil spirits away. To this day some Hawaiians plant ti near their houses to bring good luck. The leaves are also used for lava sledding. A number of leaves are lashed together and people ride down hills on them. The leaves were also used to make items of clothing including skirts worn in dance performances. The Hawaiian hula skirt is a dense skirt with an opaque layer of at least fifty green leaves and the bottom (top of the leaves) shaved flat. The Tongan dance dress, the sisi, is an apron of about 20 leaves, worn over a tupenu, and decorated with some yellow or red leaves.

The reconstructed Proto-Malayo-Polynesian word for ti is *siRi. Cognates include Malagasy síly; Palauan sis; Ere and Kuruti siy; Araki jihi; Arosi diri; Chuukese tii-n; Wuvulu si or ti; Tongan sī; Samoan, Tahitian, and Māori tī; and Hawaiian kī. The names in some languages have also been applied to the garden crotons (Codiaeum variegatum), which similarly have red or yellow leaves. The cognates of Proto-Western-Malayo-Polynesian *sabaqaŋ, similarly, have been applied to both garden crotons and ti plants.

In the Philippines, they are also known by names derived from the Proto-Austronesian *kilala, "to know", due to its use in divination rituals. Cognates derived from that usage include Tagalog sagilala; and Visayan and Bikol kilála or kilaa. In New Zealand, the terms for ti were also transferred to the native and closely related cabbage tree (Cordyline australis), as tī kōuka.

=== Cucumis melo (melon) ===
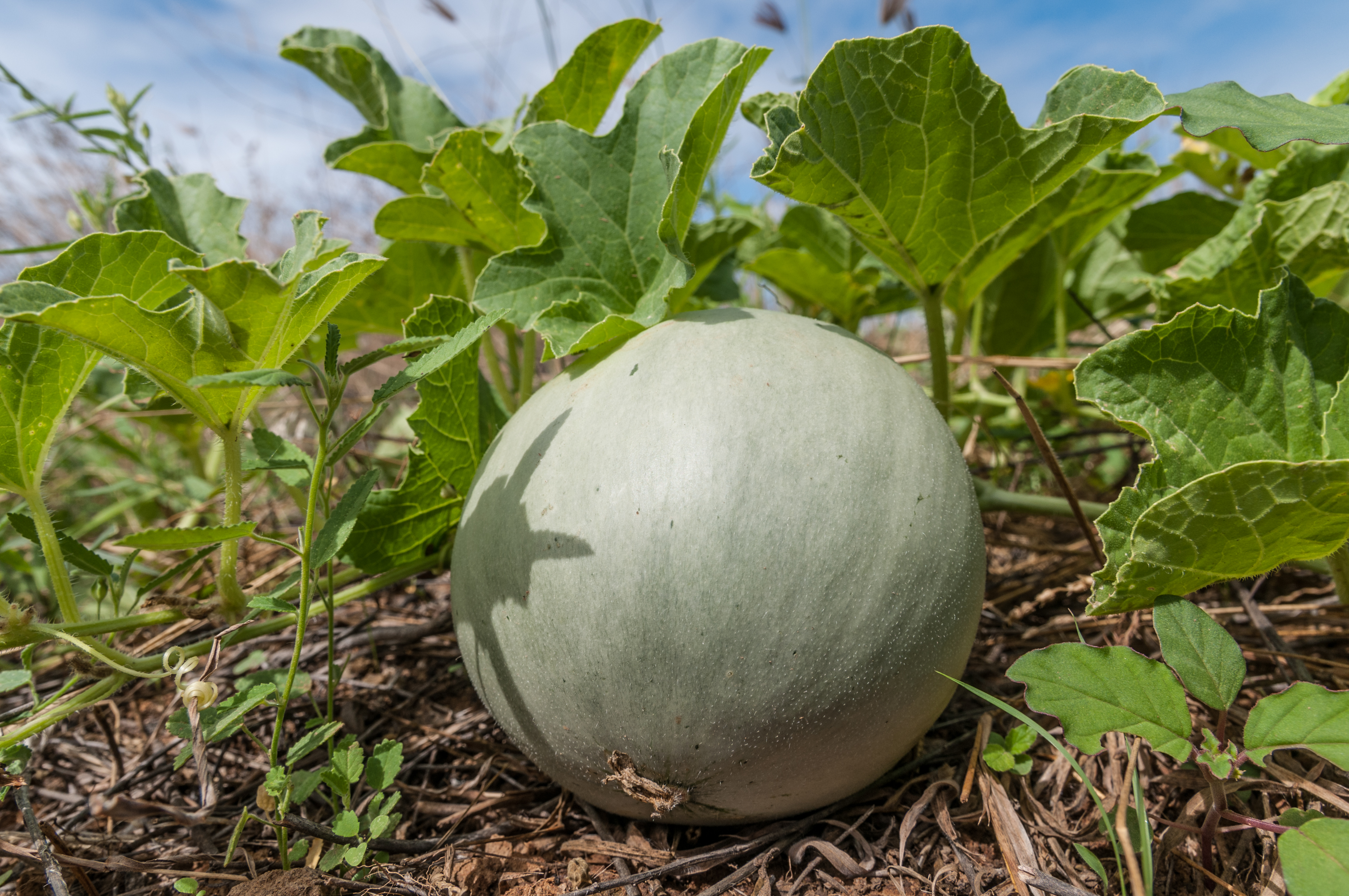
Fruit of Cucumis melo

=== Cyrtosperma merkusii (giant swamp taro) ===
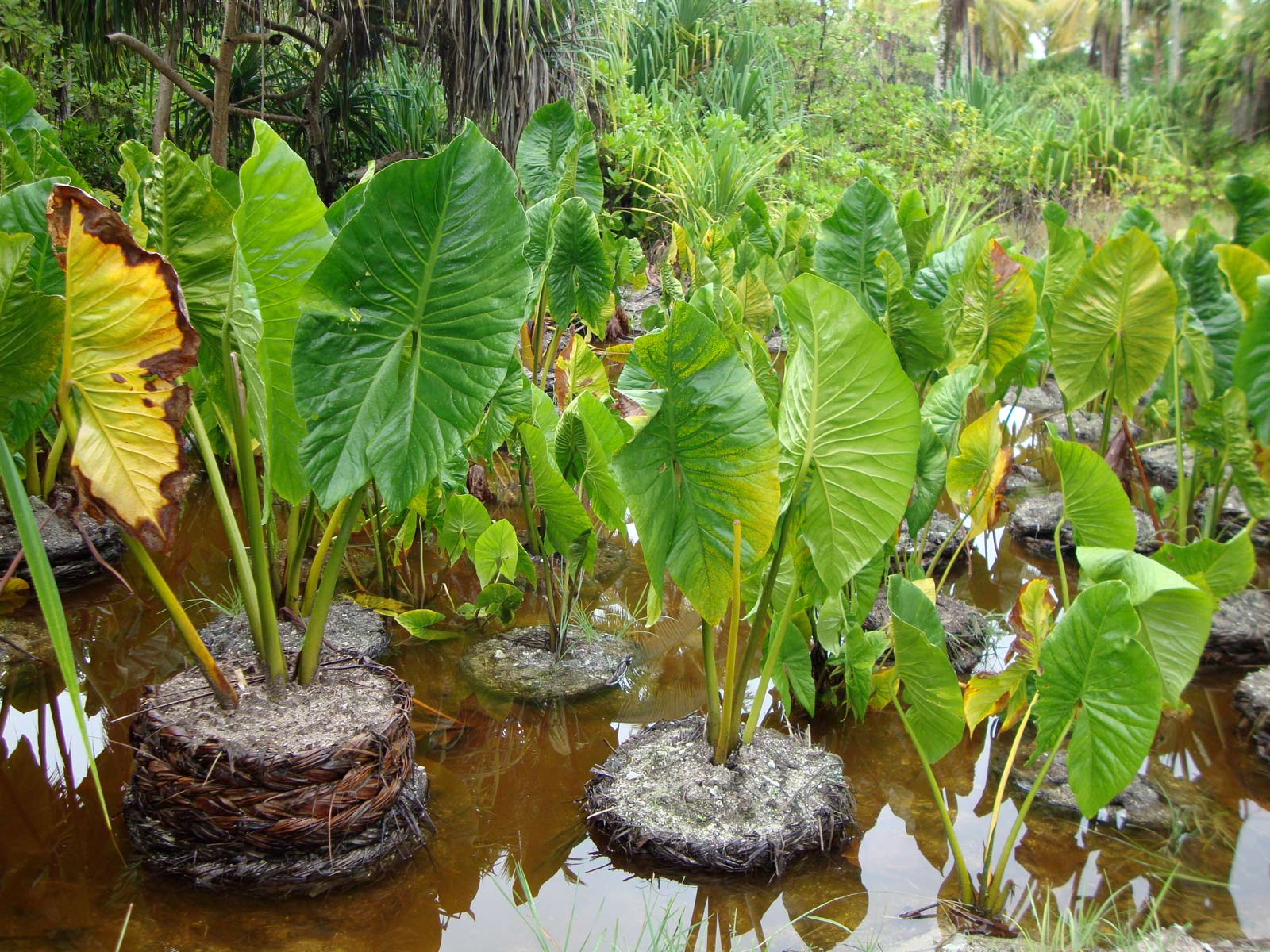
Giant swamp taro plantation in Butaritari, Kiribati.

=== Dioscorea (yams) ===
Yams (Dioscorea spp.) is a very large group of plants native throughout tropical and warm temperate regions of the world. Various species of yams were domesticated and cultivated independently within Maritime Southeast Asia and New Guinea for their starchy tubers, including the ube (Dioscorea alata), round yam (Dioscorea bulbifera), intoxicating yam (Dioscorea hispida), lesser yam (Dioscorea esculenta), Pacific yam (Dioscorea nummularia), fiveleaf yam (Dioscorea pentaphylla), and pencil yam (Dioscorea transversa). Among these, D. alata and D. esculenta were the only ones regularly cultivated and eaten, while the rest were usually considered as famine food due to their higher levels of the toxin dioscorine which requires that they be prepared correctly before consumption.

D. alata and D. esculenta were the most suitable for long transport in Austronesian ships and were carried through all or most of the range of the Austronesian expansion. D. alata in particular, were introduced into the Pacific Islands and New Zealand. They were also carried by Austronesian voyagers into Madagascar and the Comoros.

==== Dioscorea alata (ube) ====
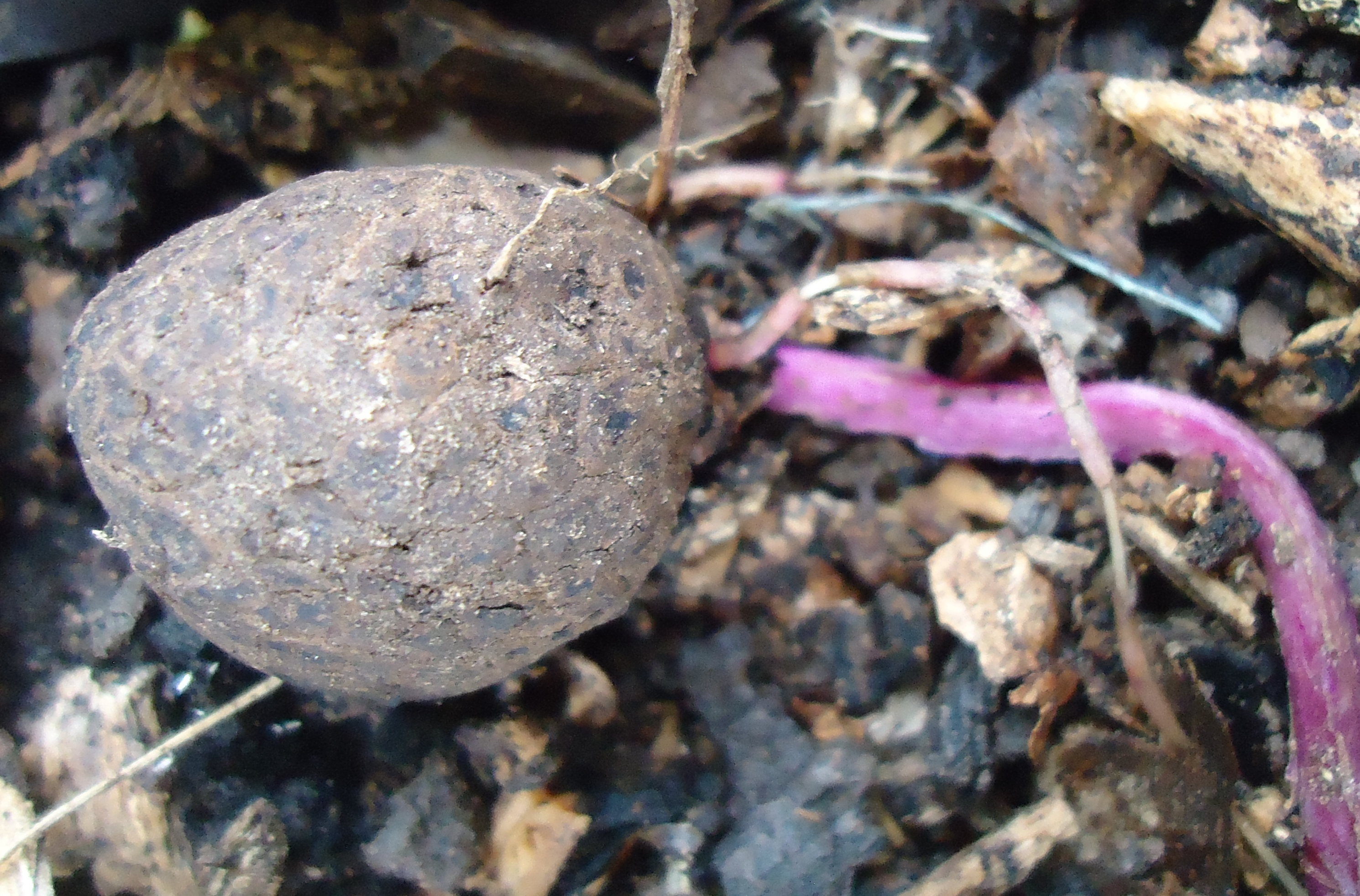
Ube (Dioscorea alata) from the Philippines where the dominant cultivated variety is vividly purple

The ube (Dioscorea alata), also known as the greater yam or water yam, is one of the most important staple crops in Austronesian cultures. It is the main species cultivated among Dioscorea, largely because of its much larger tubers and its ease of processing. Its center of origin is unknown, but archaeological evidence suggests that it was exploited in Maritime Southeast Asia and New Guinea before the Austronesian expansion. Ube is believed to be a true cultigen, only known from its cultivated forms. It is a polyploid and is sterile, and thus can not cross bodies of water. This restricts its introduction into islands purely by human agency, making them a good indicator of human movement. Some authors have proposed an origin in Mainland Southeast Asia without evidence, but it shows the greatest phenotypic variability in the Philippines and New Guinea.

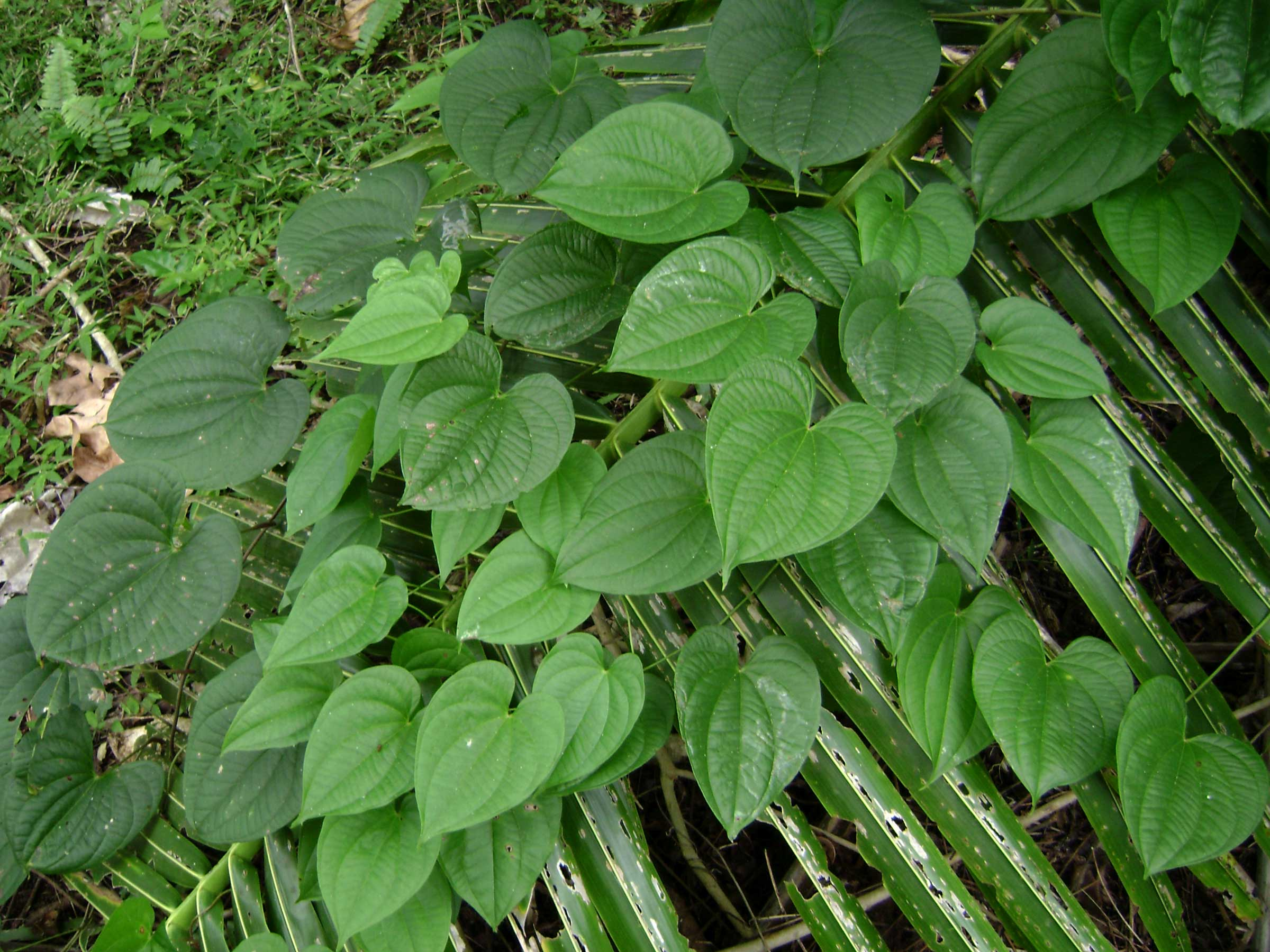
ʻUfi (Dioscorea alata) vine in Vavaʻu, Tonga

Based on archaeological evidence of early farming plots and plant remains in the Kuk Swamp site, authors have suggested that it was first domesticated in the highlands of New Guinea from around 10,000 BP and spread into Maritime Southeast Asia via the Lapita culture at around c. 4,000 BP, along with D. nummularia and D. bulbifera. In turn, D. esculenta is believed to have been introduced by the Lapita culture into New Guinea. There is also evidence of an agricultural revolution during this period brought by innovations from contact with Austronesians, including the development of wet cultivation.

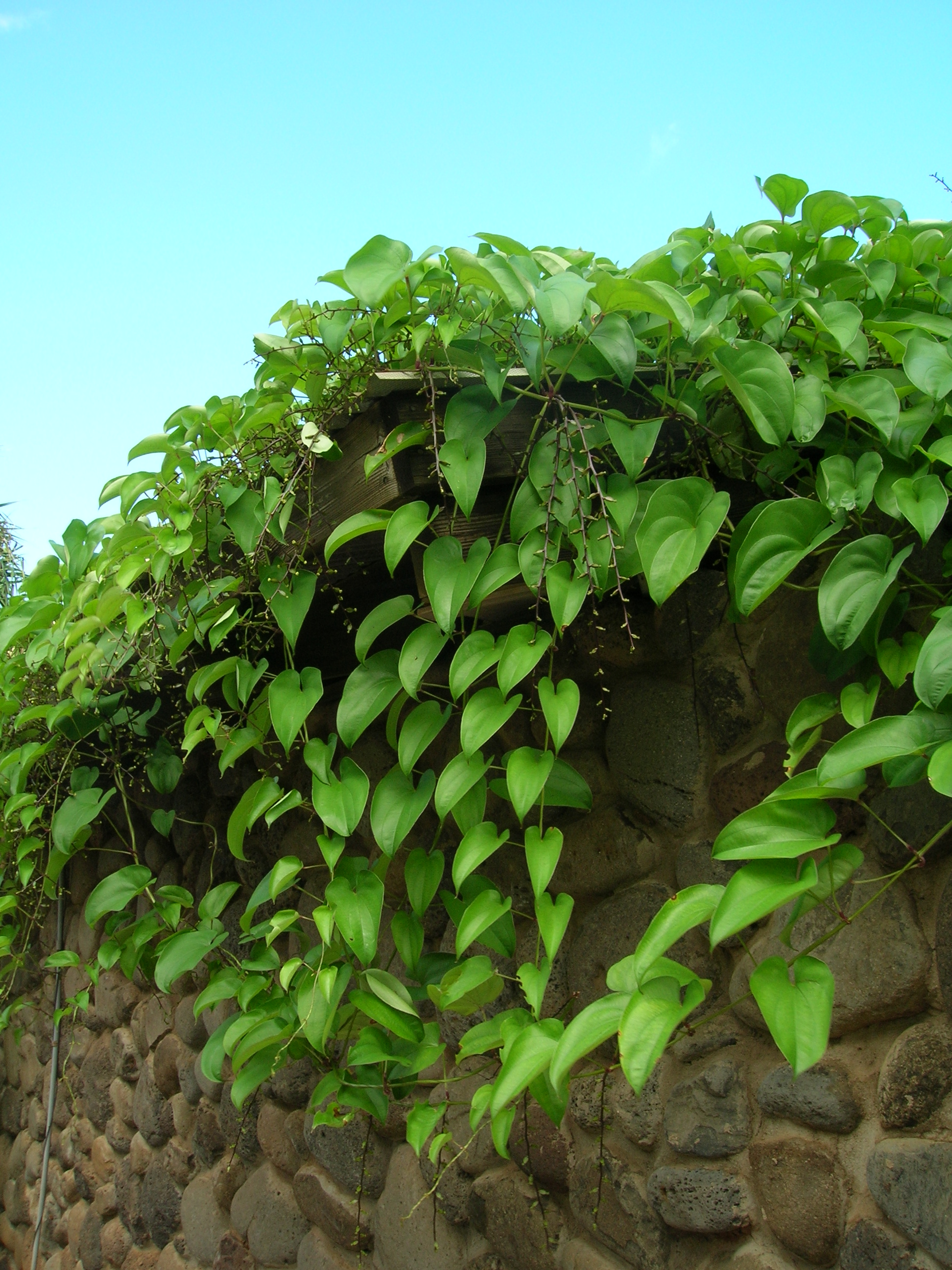
Uhi (Dioscorea alata) in Maui

However, much older remains identified as being probably D. alata have also been recovered from the Niah Caves of Borneo (Late Pleistocene, <40,000 BP) and the Ille Cave of Palawan (c. 11,000 BP), along with remains of the toxic ubi gadong (D. hispida) which requires processing before it can be edible. Although it doesn't prove cultivation, it does show that humans already had the knowledge to exploit starchy plants and that D. alata were native to Maritime Southeast Asia. Furthermore, it opens the question on whether D. alata is a true species or cultivated much older than believed.

Ube remains an important crop in Southeast Asia. Particularly in the Philippines where the vividly purple variety is widely used in various traditional and modern desserts. It also remains important in Melanesia, where it is also grown for ceremonial purposes tied to the size of the tubers at harvest time. Its importance in eastern Polynesia and New Zealand, however, has waned after the introduction of other crops, most notably the sweet potato.

The reconstructed Proto-Austronesian word for ube is *qubi, which became Proto-Malayo-Polynesian *qubi, and Proto-Oceanic *qupi. It has some of the most recognizable and widespread reflexes in Austronesian languages. Other than Tagalog where the name ube comes from in English, modern cognates include Yami uvi; Itbayaten ovi; Bontoc and Hanunó'o ʻúbi; Ilocano, Cebuano, Pangasinan, Aklanon, Itneg, and Itawis úbi or úbe; Kalamian Tagbanwa kubi; Maranao obi; Tiruray ʻubi; Manobo uvi; Kenyah, Malay, Iban, Balinese, Sasak, Mongondow, and Toba Batak ubi; Javanese uwi; Kelabit ubih; Melanau ubey; Ngaju Dayak owi; Malagasy óvy; Tsat phai; Jarai hebey; Moken koboi; Sundanese huwi; Tontemboan, Bimanese, and Manggarai uwi; Ngadha uvi; Rotinese ufi; Erai uhi; Selaru uh or uhi-re; Watubela kuwi; Buruese ubi-t; Koiwai uf; Buli up; and Waropen uwi.

Among Oceanic languages, cognates include Nauna kuh; Penchal kup; Leipon uh; Tolai up; Lakalai la-huvi; Gapapaiwa and Kilivila kuvi; Papapana na-uvi; Simbo, Bugotu, and Nggela, and Fijian uvi; Kwaio, Niue, and Samoan ufi; Sa'a, Arosi, Tuamotuan, Hawaiian and Rapa Nui uhi; Marquesan puauhi; Haununu a-uhi; Avava ''o-ovi; Rennellese ʻuhi; Tongan ʻufi; Anuta upi; Rarotongan uʻi; and Māori uwhi or uhi.

In some ethnic groups, the word has been generalized or shifted to mean other types of yams, as well as the sweet potato and cassava. Other words for ube are also derived from the ancestral names of other species of yam.

==== Dioscorea bulbifera (air yam) ====
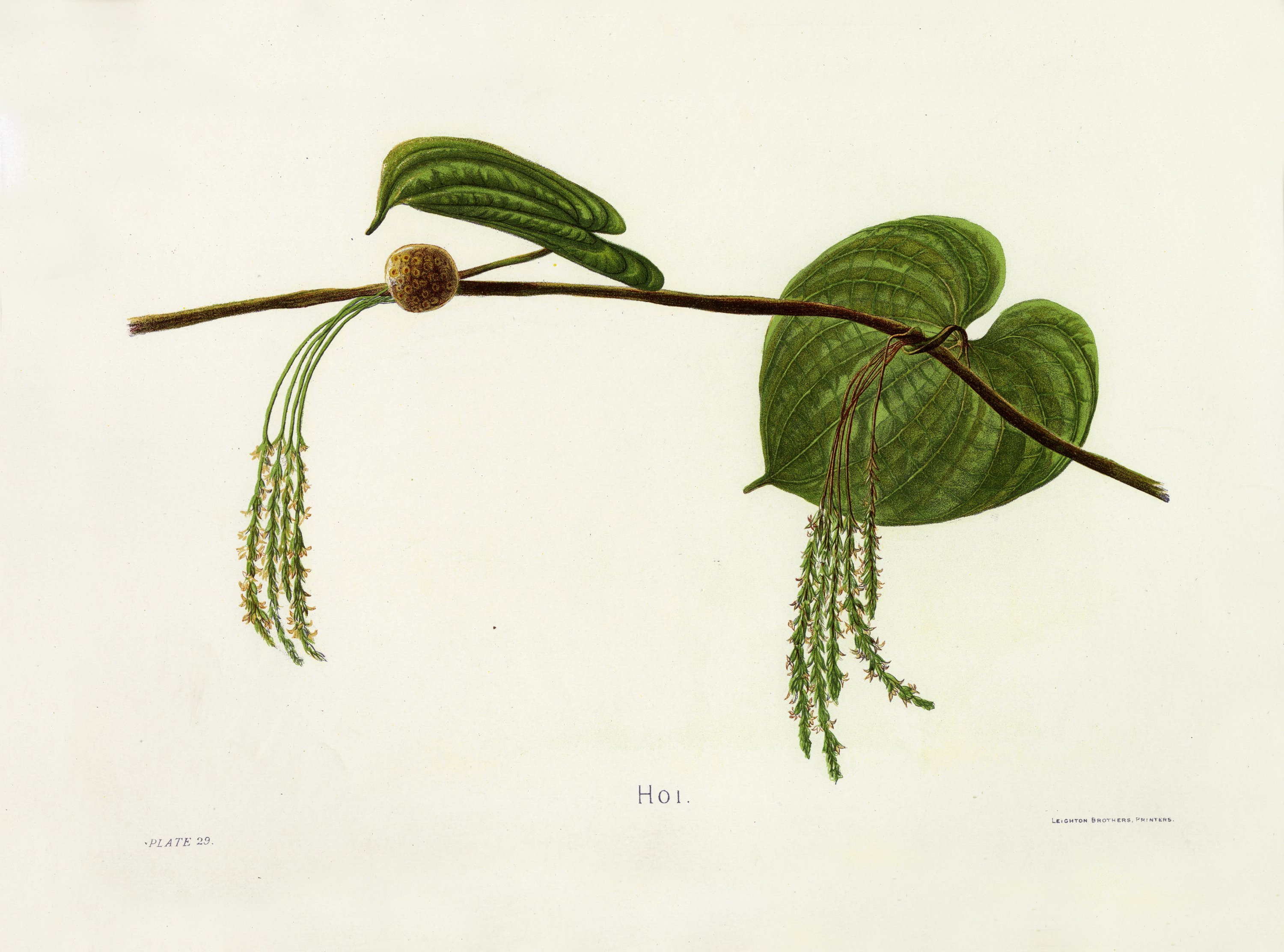
Illustration of D. bulbifera in Indigenous Flowers of the Hawaiian Islands (Frances Sinclair, 1885)

The air yam (Dioscorea bulbifera), also known as the bitter yam, is one of the lesser cultivated species of yam. It is usually only eaten as famine food in Maritime Southeast Asia, Melanesia, and Polynesia, because of the toxicity of some wild or feral plants when not cooked correctly. However it is one of only three yams that were carried by Austronesians into Remote Oceania, the others being D. alata and D. nummularia. The part of the plant harvested are the aerial tubers, as it does not usually produce large underground tubers.

It can be reconstructed to Proto-Oceanic as *pwatika or *pʷatik, with cognates including Lou puet; Lamusong patik; Boanaki posika; and Kwara'ae fasia. However, in Lamusong its meaning has shifted to the lesser yam, while in Boanaki, the meaning has shifted to a more generalized term for yams. It can also be reconstructed to the more generalized Proto-Oceanic *balai, meaning "wild yam", which became Proto-Micronesian *palai, with cognates including Rotuman parai; Tongan, Niue, and Samoan palai; and Rennellese pagai.

==== Dioscorea esculenta (lesser yam) ====
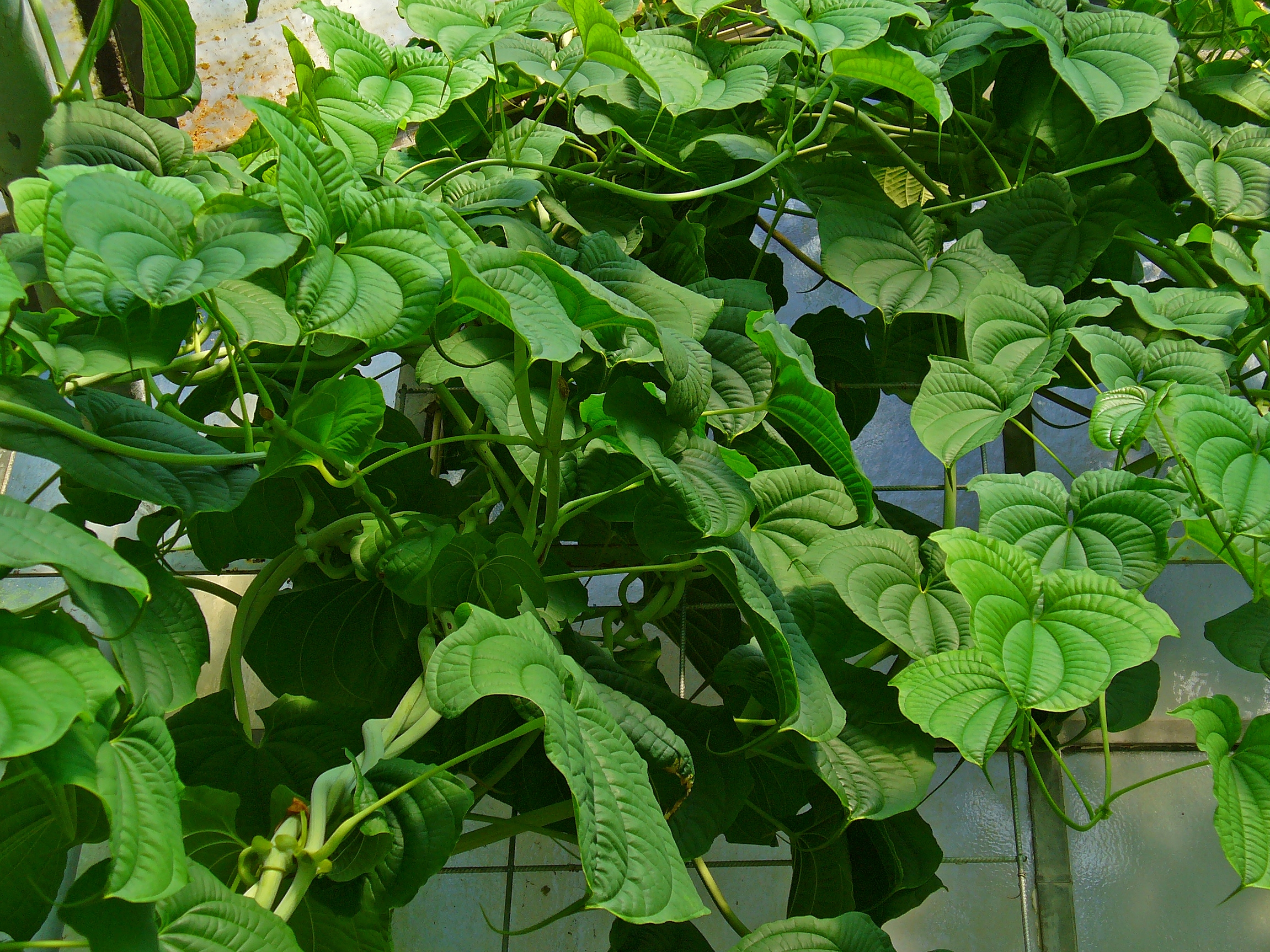
Dioscorea esculenta in the Botanical Garden of the KIT

The lesser yam (Dioscorea esculenta) is the second most important yam crop among Austronesians. Like D. alata, it requires minimal processing, unlike the other more bitter yam species. However, it has smaller tubers than D. alata and is usually spiny. Like D. alata it was introduced to Madagascar and the Comoros by Austronesians, where it spread to the East African coast. They are also a dominant crop in Near Oceania, However, it did not reach to the furthest islands in Polynesia, being absent in Hawaii and New Zealand.

Starch grains identified to be from the lesser yam have been recovered from archaeological sites of the Lapita culture in Viti Levu, Fiji, dated to around 3,050 to 2,500 cal BP. Traces of D. esculenta (along with D. alata, D. bulbifera, D. nummularia and D. pentaphylla) yams have also been identified from the Mé Auré Cave site in Moindou, New Caledonia, dated to around 2,700 to 1,800 BP. Remains of D. esculenta have also been recovered from archaeological sites in Guam, dated to around 1031 CE. D. esculenta is believed to have been introduced by the Lapita culture into New Guinea at around 4,000 BP, along with agricultural innovations like wet cultivation as well as swidden farming. In archaeological sites in New Guinea, it is associated with the appearance of high-density populations in the coastal areas.

Terms for lesser yam in Austronesian languages are mostly affixed or two-word forms derived from the *qubi root for D. alata, like Samoan ufi lei, Sundanese ubi aung, Malay ubi torak, and Javanese ubi gemblii. A term for lesser yam can be reconstructed in Proto-Philippine as *tugiq, but its cognates are limited to the island of Luzon, including Ivatan togi; Ilocano and Kankana-ey tugí; Bontoc and Ifugao tugi; and Tagalog tugiʻ. No Proto-Oceanic term can be reconstructed for the lesser yam because it is absent in Remote Oceania. However, it can be reconstructed in Proto-Western-Oceanic as *kamisa, *qamisa, or *mamisa.

==== Dioscorea hispida (intoxicating yam) ====
The intoxicating yam (Dioscorea hispida), is native to tropical Asia and New Guinea. It is only cultivated minimally in parts of Java. Elsewhere it is harvested from the wild. Like D. bulbifera it has toxic tubers that need to be prepared correctly before they can be eaten, and thus were only suitable for famine food. However, it is one of the Dioscorea species identified from the Niah Caves archaeological site dating to <40,000 BP. Its names can be reconstructed to Proto-Western-Malayo-Polynesian *gaduŋ. Its modern cognates in most Western Malayo-Polynesian languages is gadung or gadong (also ubi gadung or ubi gadong). The names are also applied to the similarly toxic introduced cassava.

=== Ficus (fig trees) ===
Ficus is a genus of about 850 species of woody trees, shrubs, vines, epiphytes and hemiepiphytes of the family Moraceae, which are collectively known as fig trees or figs. These plants are native to the tropics, with some species extending into the semi-warm temperate zone. Despite not being a genus exclusive to the Austronesian regions, several species such as ficus dammaropsis, ficus fistulosa, ficus hispida, ficus nota, ficus pseudopalma, ficus septica, ficus variegata, ficus aspera, ficus fraseri, ficus tinctoria, ficus ulmifolia, ficus wassa, ficus mutabilis, ficus deltoidea, ficus nota and ficus pseudopalma are endemic to these regions, and played an important role in Austronesian cultures.

==== Ficus aspera ====
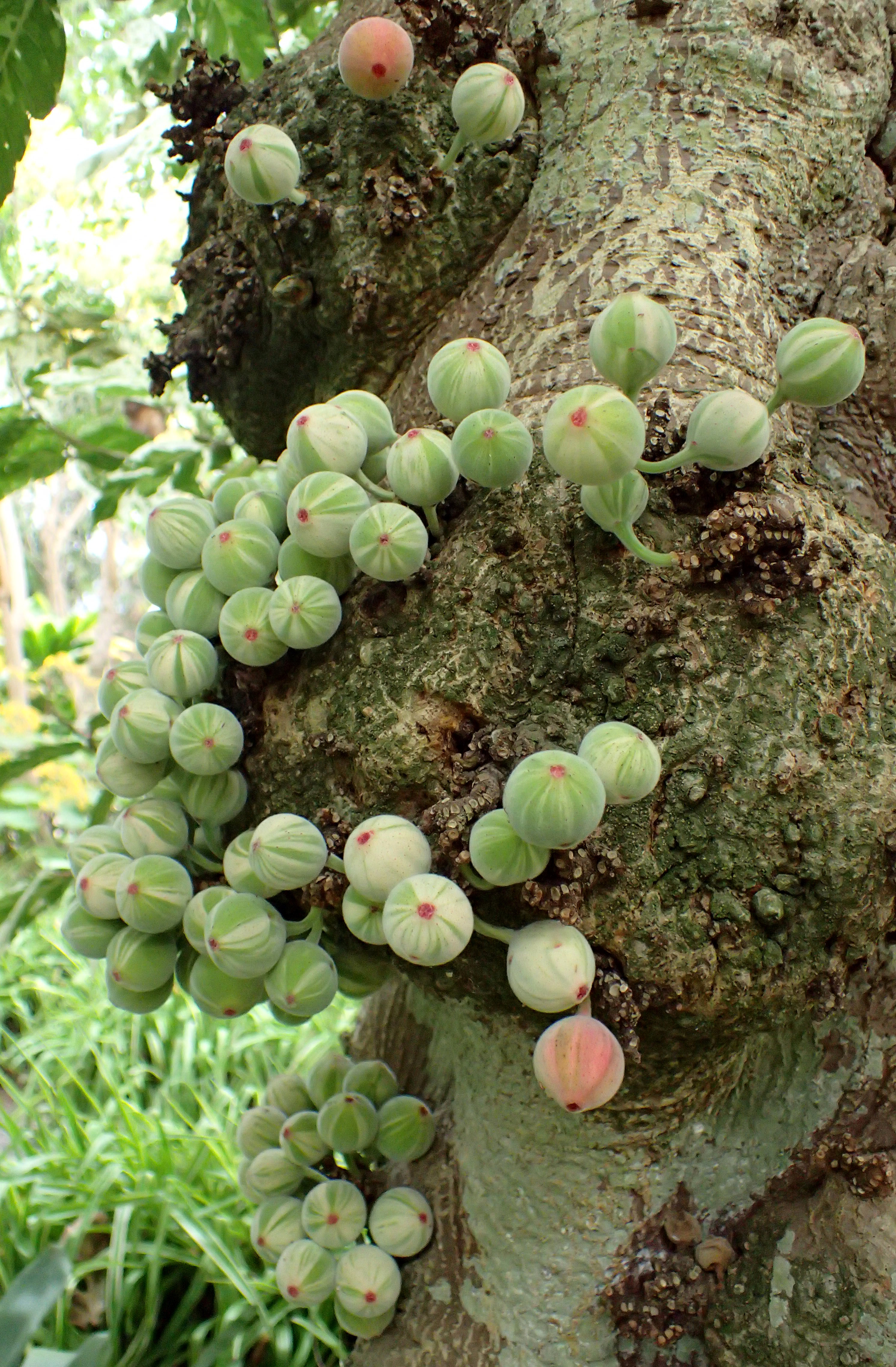
Ficus aspera at the Garden of Acclimatization of La Orotava

Ficus aspera, also known as mosaic fig, is a plant native to Vanuatu, in the South Pacific region. The fruits of this plant are cauliflowerous (fruits that form from their main stems or woody trunks instead of new shoots). The mosaic fig is used as an ornamental plant.

==== Ficus dammaropsis ====
Ficus dammaropsis, known as kapiak in Tok pisin, is a tropical fig with huge 60 cm pleated leaves native to the highlands and highland fringe of New Guinea . Its fruit is edible, but it is rarely eaten except as an emergency food. When consumed, the young leaves are pickled or boiled and eaten as a salad with pork.

==== Ficus fraseri ====
Ficus fraseru, also known as white sandpaper fig and bright sandpaper fig, is one of several species of figs known as paper figs' sandpaper . This fig is native to New South Wales, Queensland, and Northern New Caledonia and Vanuatu. This fig grows as a bush or as a tree, with a height that varies between 6 and 15 meters. Its leaves are 6 to 14 cm long and 2.5 to 6.5 cm wide on petioles 1 to 2 cm long. The rounded figs are 1 to 1.5 cm long and start out yellow, maturing to orange-red between May and February in the species' native range. These are edible but tasteless. Although rarely seen in cultivation, it is a fast growing ornamental species. It can be easily propagated from seeds.

==== Ficus nota ====
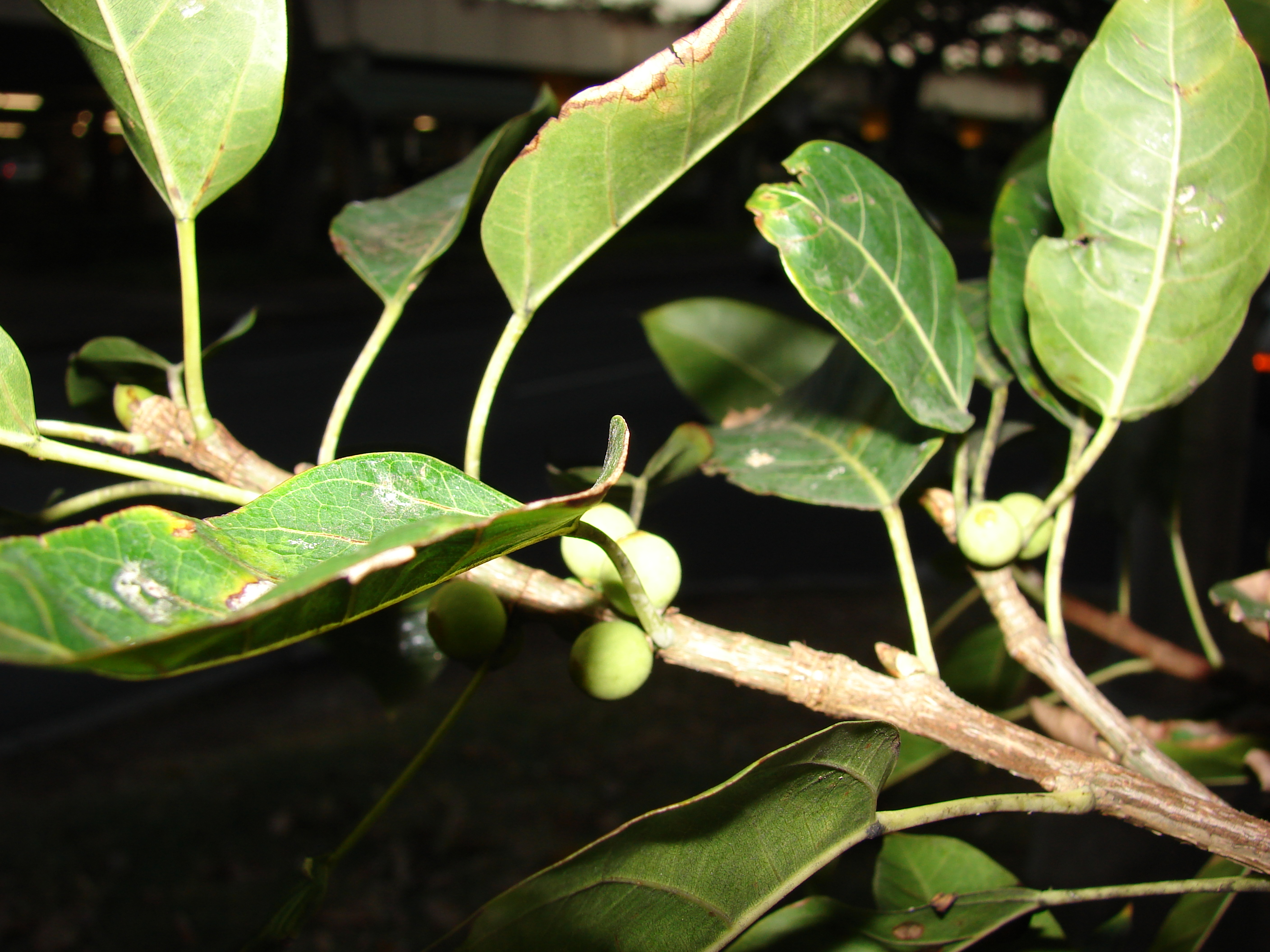
Ficus nota in Hawaii

Ficus nota, is a species of flowering plant known as tibig, found near water at low altitudes. The tibig is native to the Philippines. They are also found in parts of northern Borneo, in Malaysia. The tree can grow up to 9 meters high.

The fruits are also edible for humans, although they are quite tasteless. They are usually eaten with sugar and cream in the Philippines. The raw leaves are also eaten as a vegetable.

==== Ficus pseudopalma ====
Ficus pseudopalma, is a species of fig commonly known as Philippine fig, Philippine fig, dracaena fig or palm leaf fig. This is an endemic species of Philippines, especially the island of Luzon.

This is a bush that grows erect with a bare, branchless stem topped with a clump of leaves that give it the appearance of a palm tree (hence the term pseudopalma in its name, meaning "false palm"). The fruit is a dark green fig that grows in pairs, each fruit just over an inch long.

In Luzon, this plant is found in grassland and forest habitats, where it is considered common. The shoots of this plant are consumed as a type of vegetable, and there are several traditional uses; among these is its use as a remedy for kidney stones, which is obtained from the leaves. In the Bicol region, the plant is known as Lubi-lubi, and the ojas are cooked in coconut milk. This shrub has also been used as a landscaping plant in Hawaii, but it never escaped cultivation or became established in the wild, because the wasp species that pollinates it never reached the islands.

==== Ficus tinctoria ====
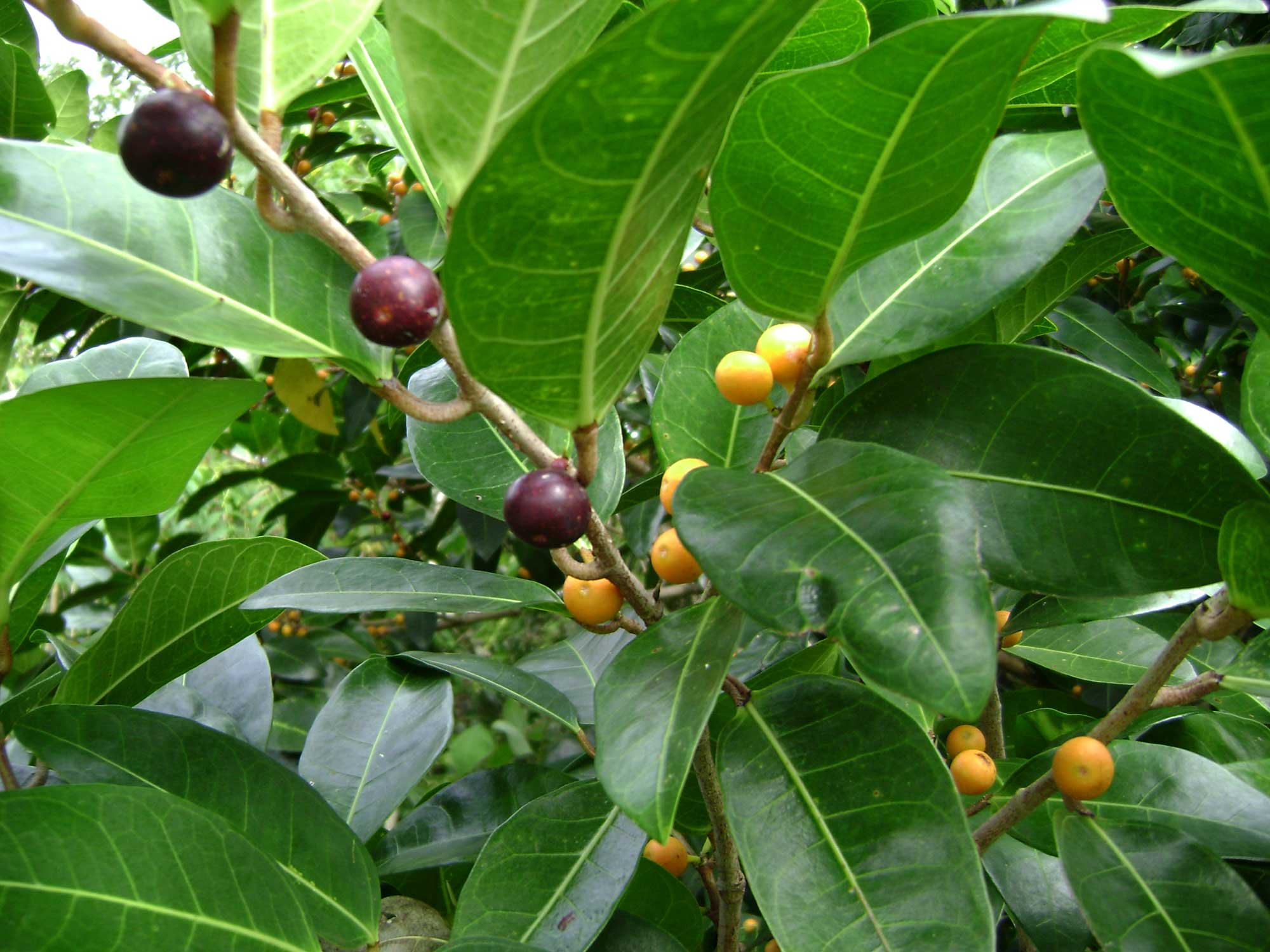
Ficus tinctoria in Vava'u, Tonga

Ficus tinctoria, also known as coloring fig or hunchback fig, is a tree belonging to one of the species known as strangler figs. This is found in Malaysia, northern Australia and the islands of the South Pacific.

Palms are favorable host species. The root systems of the coloring fig can join to be self-supporting, but the epiphyte usually drops if the host tree dies or rots. The small rust-brown fruit of the dye fig is the source of a red dye used in traditional fabric making in parts of Oceania and Indonesia. The fruit is also edible and an important food source in the low-lying atolls of Micronesia and Polynesia.

==== Ficus variegata ====
Ficus variegata, is a species of tropical fig found in various parts of Asia, Pacific islands and southeastern Australia. There are several names for this species, such as common red-stemmed fig, green-fruited fig and variegated fig.

=== Hibiscus ===
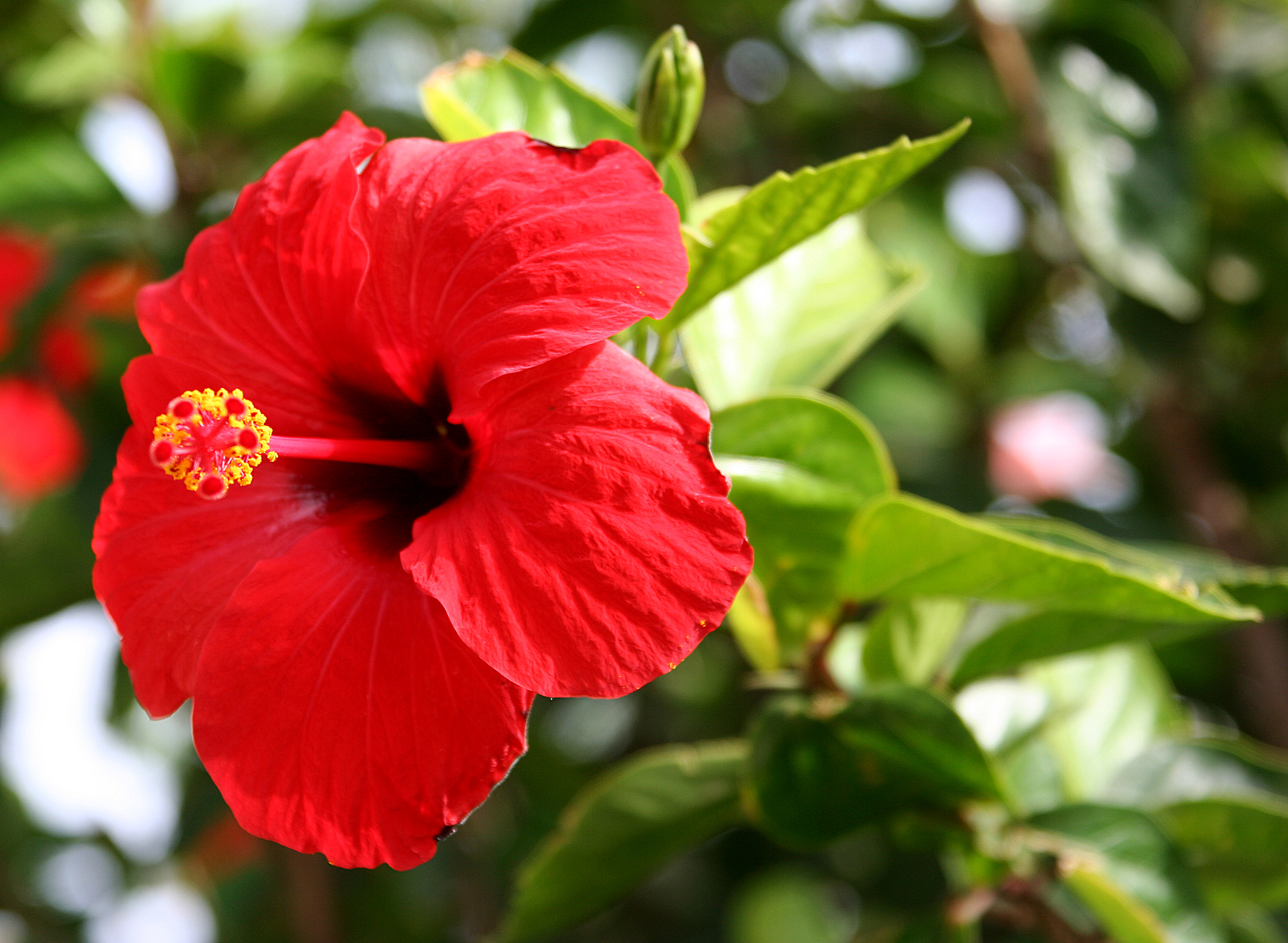
Hibiscus × rosa-sinensis

Hibiscus × rosa-sinensis, a common ornamental plant, was initially described from cultivated specimens collected from South Asia and Indonesia. Wild populations have never been found, thus its origin remained unresolved for almost 300 years. Various theories ascribe its origins to Southeast Asia, South Asia, China, the Indian Ocean Islands, East Africa, and even the Americas.

A study in 2024 based on molecular and morphological data showed that it is a pre-colonial hybrid created in cultivation by Polynesians through a cross between Hibiscus cooperi and Hibiscus kaute. The parent species were originally from Vanuatu and Tahiti respectively. The natural distributions of the parents are more than 4,000 km (2,500 miles) apart. H. kaute was important in Polynesian culture and medicine, which appears to have led to it being taken across the south Pacific in traditional canoes, where it eventually hybridized with H. cooperi.

=== Morinda citrifolia (noni) ===
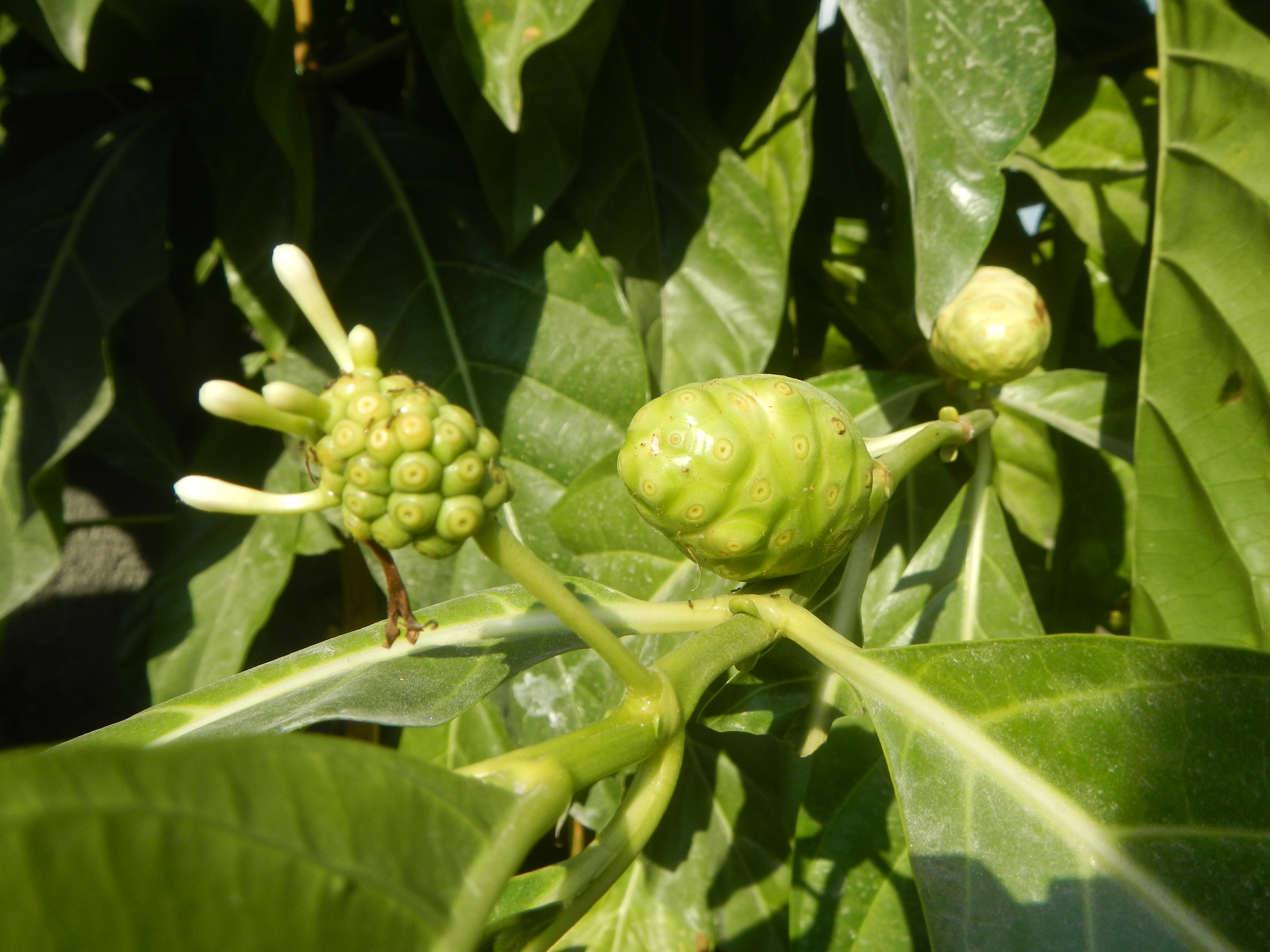
Noni fruits and flowers in Bulacan, Philippines

Noni (Morinda citrifolia) is native to Southeast Asia extending to New Guinea and northern Australia. It grows readily in beach and rocky environments. It has been introduced widely into the Pacific. All parts of the plant were used by Austronesians for traditional medicine and timber, but its most common traditional use is for the extraction of red or yellow dyes. The odor of the plant and the fruit was also traditionally believed to repel evil spirits. The fruit is also edible, but is usually only eaten as famine food.

There are several terms for noni that can be reconstructed. The most widespread is Proto-Central-Eastern Malayo-Polynesian *ñəñu. Cognates include Kapampangan lino; Tagalog and Bikol níno; Cebuano ninú; Gedaged nanom or nonom; Takia nom; Bimanese nonu; Tetun nenu-k; Leti and Asilulu nenu; Leti (Moa) nienu; Wetan neni. It became Proto-Oceanic *ñoñu, with cognates including Nali non; Leipon and Wogeo ñoñ; Bipi ñoy; Gitua and Rarotongan nono; Gilbertese non; Motu, Tongan, Niue, Futunan, Samoan, Tuvaluan, Kapingamarangi, Nukuoro, and Anuta nonu; and Hawaiian noni (from which the English name is derived from). In some languages the meaning has shifted to mean "small tree" or "shrub" or to the closely related Morinda umbellata and Morinda bracteata.

In Western Malayo-Polynesian, another term that can be reconstructed is Proto-Western Malayo-Polynesian *baŋkudu, which may have referred to a different species of Morinda originally. Its cognates including Tagalog and Cebuano bangkúro; Agutaynen bangkoro; Tausug, Toba Batak, and Balinese bangkudu; Sundanese cangkudu; Sasak bengkudu; Mongondow bongkudu; and Malay mengkudu.

There are also smaller cognate sets, like Proto-Philippine *apatut for the tree and Proto-Oceanic *gurat and *kurat for the red dye produced from the tree.

=== Musa (bananas) ===
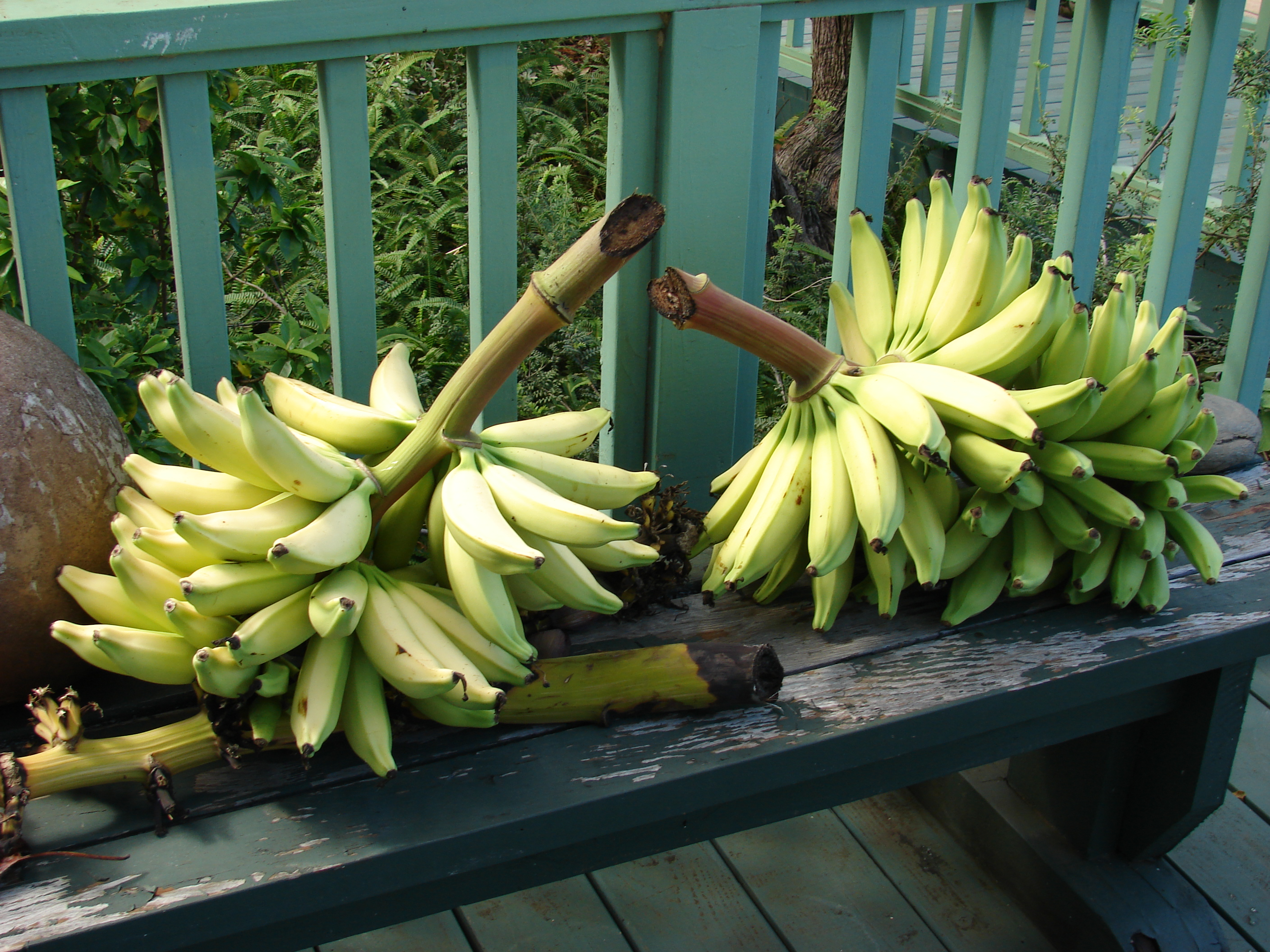
Iholena bananas in Maui, Hawaii

The earliest domestication of bananas (Musa spp.) were initially from naturally occurring parthenocarpic (seedless) individuals of Musa acuminata banksii in New Guinea, before the arrival of Austronesian-speakers. Numerous phytoliths of bananas have been recovered from the Kuk Swamp archaeological site and dated to around 10,000 to 6,500 BP. From New Guinea, cultivated bananas spread westward into Maritime Southeast Asia through proximity (not migrations). They hybridized with other (possibly independently domesticated) subspecies of Musa acuminata as well as Musa balbisiana in the Philippines, northern New Guinea, and possibly Halmahera. These hybridization events produced the triploid cultivars of bananas commonly grown today. From Maritime Southeast Asia, they became part of the staple crops of Austronesian peoples and were spread during their voyages and ancient maritime trading routes into Oceania, East Africa, South Asia, and Indochina.

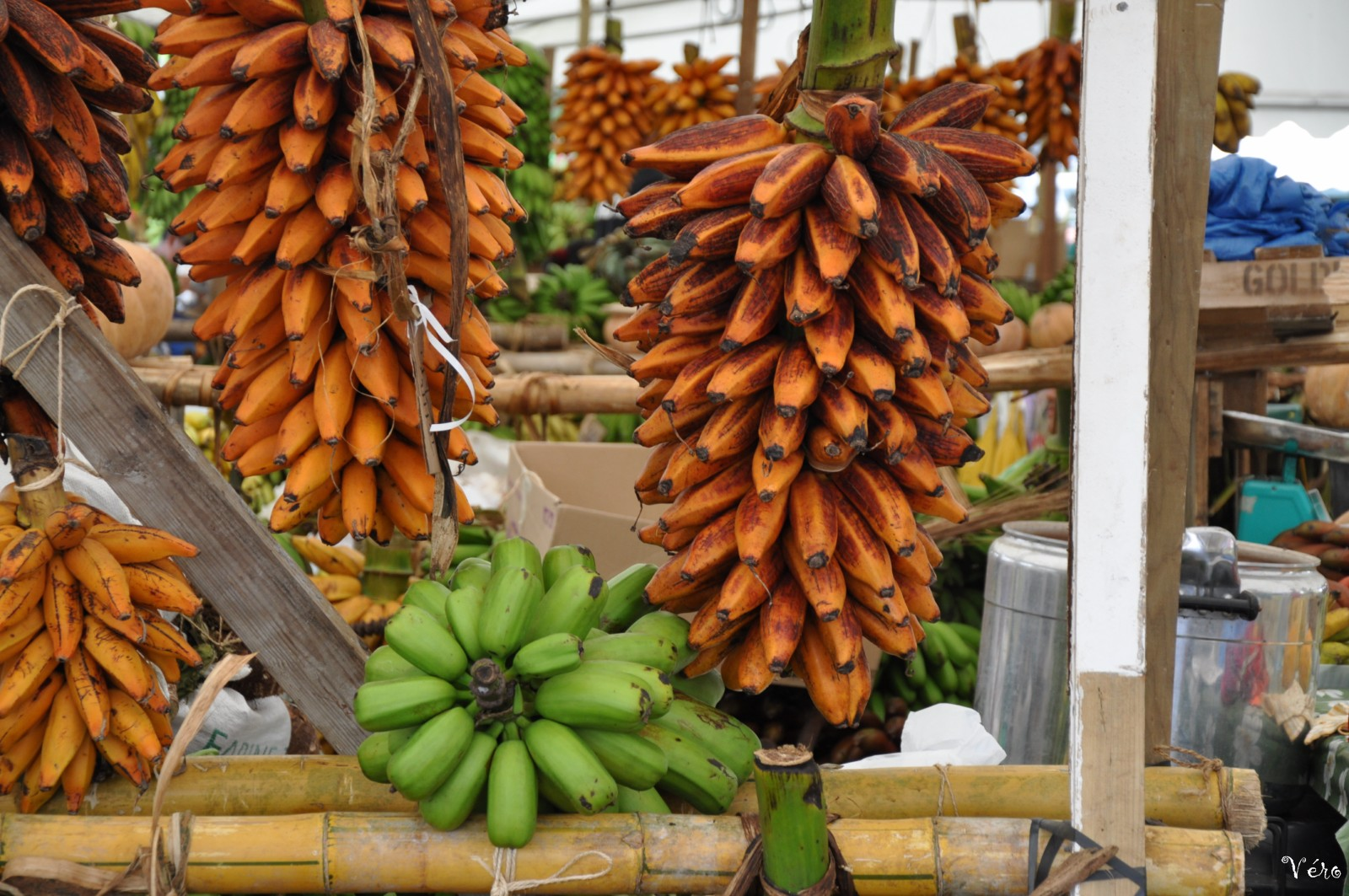
Fe'i bananas in Tahiti

These ancient introductions resulted in the banana subgroup now known as the "true" plantains, which include the East African Highland bananas and the Pacific plantains (the Iholena and Maoli-Popo'ulu subgroups). East African Highland bananas originated from banana populations introduced to Madagascar probably from the region between Java, Borneo, and New Guinea; while Pacific plantains were introduced to the Pacific Islands from either eastern New Guinea or the Bismarck Archipelago.

A second wave of introductions later spread bananas to other parts of tropical Asia, particularly Indochina and the Indian subcontinent.

==== Musa textilis (abacá) ====
Abacá (Musa textilis) also known as Manila Hemp, is grown traditionally for its fiber in the Philippines. It was once one of the world's premier fibers, valued for its use in soft, lustrous, and silky fabrics. It was a major luxury export of the Philippines during the Colonial Era, and was introduced to Hawaii and Central America by Europeans. It has since been replaced by synthetic fibers like rayon and nylon.

==== Musa × troglodytarum (fe'i banana) ====
Fe'i bananas (Musa × troglodytarum), also spelled Fehi or Féi, are banana cultivars unique to Melanesia, the Maluku Islands, and Polynesia. Unlike other domesticated banana cultivars which are derived from Musa acuminata and Musa balbisiana, fe'i bananas are believed to be hybrids derived from entirely different species. Proposed progenitors of fe'i bananas include Musa jackeyi, Musa lolodensis, Musa maclayi, and Musa peekelii, all of which are native to New Guinea and surrounding islands. Like other bananas, they were spread eastwards to Polynesia for use as food. However, they are absent in Maritime Southeast Asia, reaching only as far as the Maluku Islands.

=== Myristica fragrans (nutmeg) ===
The earliest evidence of use of nutmeg (Myristica fragrans ) comes in the form of 3,500-year-old potsherd residues from the island of Pulau Ai, one of the Banda Islands in eastern Indonesia. The Banda Islands consist of eleven small volcanic islands, and are part of the larger Maluku Islands group. These islands were the only source of nutmeg and mace production until the mid-19th century. It was one of the spices traded over the Austronesian maritime spice trade network since at least 1500 BCE.

In the sixth century AD, nutmeg use spread to India, then further west to Constantinople. By the 13th century, Arab traders had pinpointed the origin of nutmeg to the Banda Islands, but kept this location a secret from European traders.

=== Oryza sativa (rice) ===
Map of the Neolithic China (8,500 to 1,500 BCE)

Rice (Oryza sativa) is one of the most ancient Austronesian staples, and is likely to have been originally domesticated by their ancestors long before the Austronesian expansion. It remains the main crop plant cultivated in Maritime Southeast Asia.

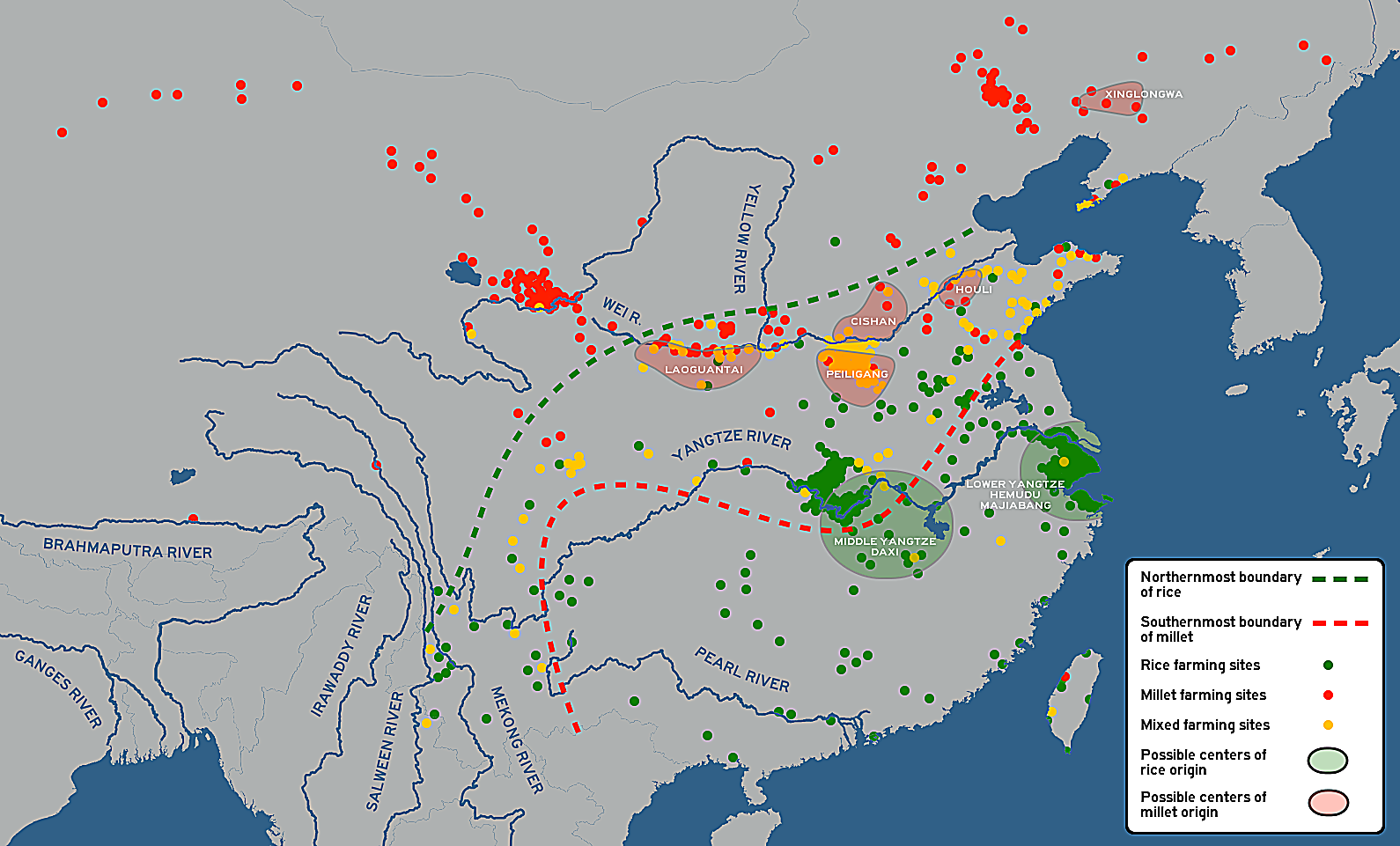
Spatial distribution of rice, millet and mixed farming sites in Neolithic China (He et al., 2017)

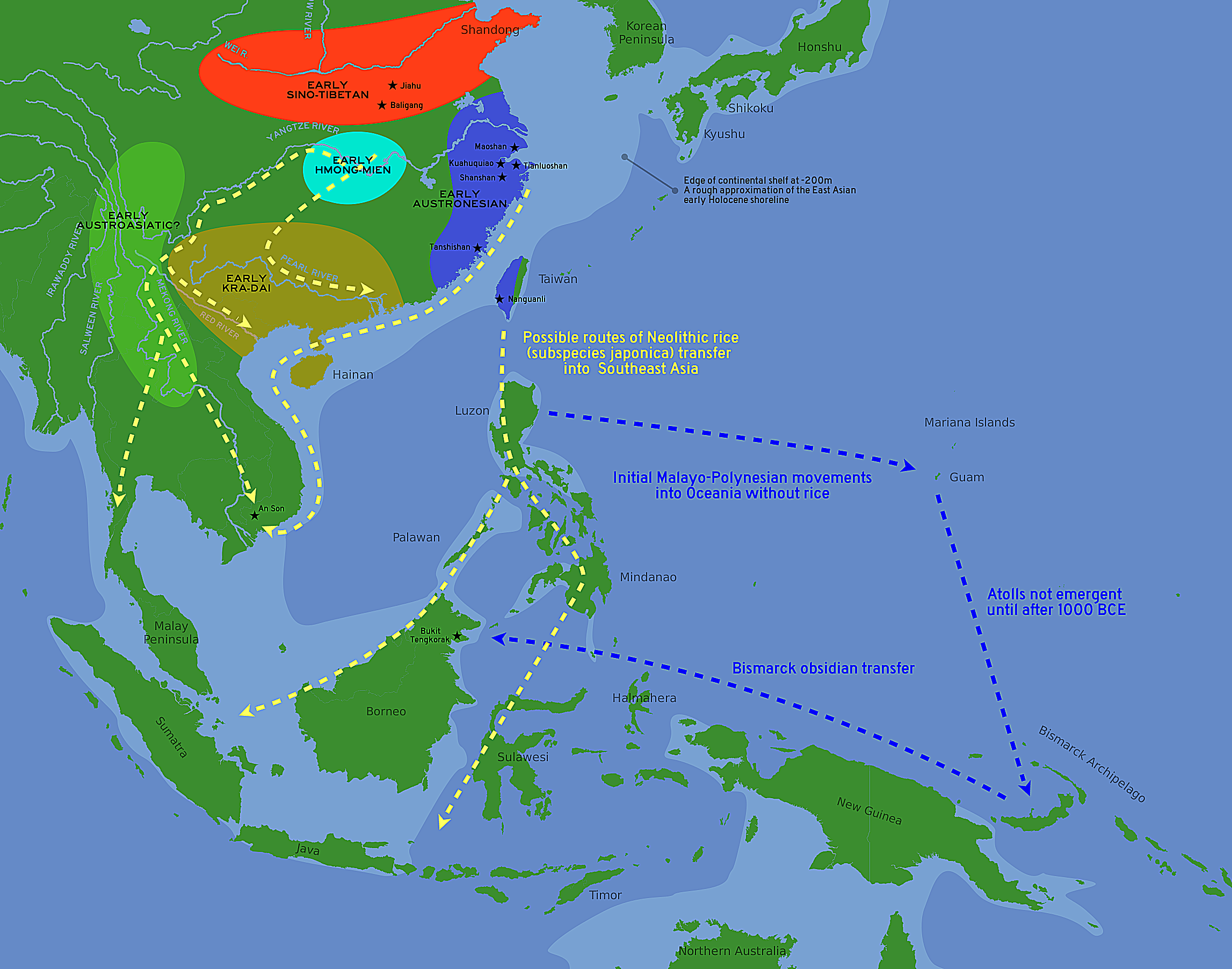
Likely routes of early rice transfer, and possible language family homelands (ca. 5,500 to 2,500 BP). The approximate coastlines during the early Holocene are shown in lighter blue. (Bellwood, 2011)

There are two most likely centers of domestication for rice as well as the development of the wetland agriculture technology. The first, and most likely, is in the lower Yangtze River, believed to be the homelands of early Austronesian speakers and associated with the Kauhuqiao, Hemudu, Majiabang, and Songze cultures. It is characterized by typical Austronesian innovations, including stilt houses, jade carving, and boat technologies. Their diet were also supplemented by acorns, water chestnuts, foxnuts, and pig domestication.

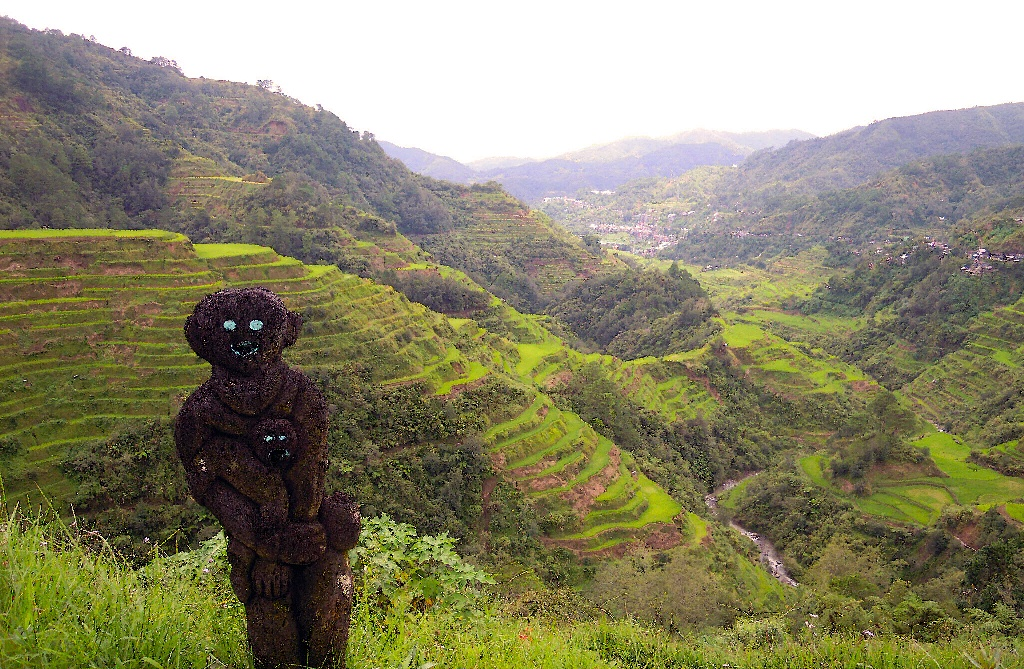
Ifugao hogang, guardian spirits carved from tree fern trunks overlooking the Banaue Rice Terraces of Luzon

The second is in the middle Yangtze River, believed to be the homelands of the early Hmong–Mien speakers and associated with the Pengtoushan and Daxi cultures. Both of these regions were heavily populated and had regular trade contacts with each other, as well as with early Austroasiatic speakers to the west, and early Kra-Dai speakers to the south, facilitating the spread of rice cultivation throughout southern China.

The spread of japonica rice cultivation to Southeast Asia started with the migrations of the Austronesian Dapenkeng culture into Taiwan between 5,500 and 4,000 BP. The Nanguanli site in Taiwan, dated to ca. 4,800 BP, has yielded numerous carbonized remains of both rice and millet in waterlogged conditions, indicating intensive wetland rice cultivation and dryland millet cultivation.

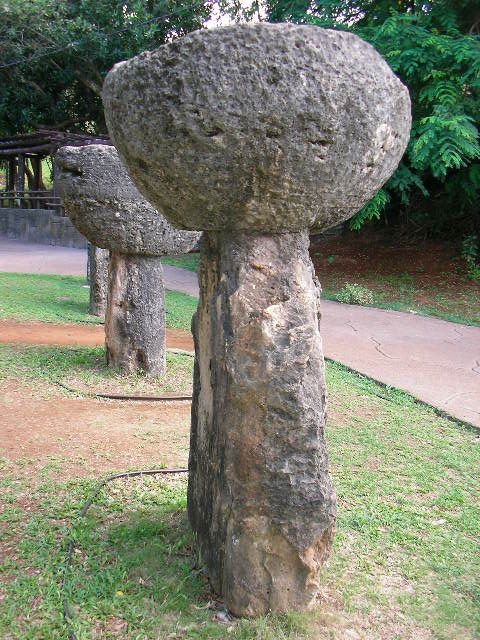
Latte stone pillars (haligi) from Hagåtña, Guam

From about 4,000 to 2,500 BP, the Austronesian expansion began, with settlers from Taiwan moving south to colonize Luzon in the Philippines, bringing rice cultivation technologies with them. From Luzon, Austronesians rapidly colonized the rest of Maritime Southeast Asia, moving westwards to Borneo, the Malay Peninsula and Sumatra; and southwards to Sulawesi and Java. By 2,500 BP, there is evidence of intensive wetland rice agriculture already established in Java and Bali, especially near very fertile volcanic islands.

However, rice (as well as dogs and pigs) did not survive the first Austronesian voyages into Micronesia due to the sheer distance of ocean they were crossing. These voyagers became the ancestors of the Lapita culture. By the time they migrated southwards to the Bismarck Archipelago, they had already lost the technology of rice farming, as well as pigs and dogs. However, knowledge of rice cultivation is still evident in the way they adapted the wetland agriculture techniques to taro cultivation. The Lapita culture in Bismarck reestablished trade connections with other Austronesian branches in Maritime Southeast Asia.

The Lapita culture also came into contact with the non-Austronesian (Papuan) early agriculturists of New Guinea and introduced wetland farming techniques to them. In turn, they assimilated their range of indigenous cultivated fruits and tubers, as well as reacquiring domesticated dogs and pigs, before spreading further eastward to Island Melanesia and Polynesia.

Rice, along with other Southeast Asian food plants, were also later introduced to Madagascar, the Comoros, and the coast of East Africa by around the 1st millennium CE by Austronesian sailors from the Greater Sunda Islands.

Much later Austronesian voyages from Maritime Southeast Asia succeeded in bringing rice to Guam during the Latte Period (1,100 to 300 BP). Guam is the only island in Oceania where rice was grown in pre-colonial times. Rice was only brought successfully into the Hawaiian Islands in the 19th century as a foreign import first documented in 1816 by Francisco de Paula Marin, this is reflected in the loanword laiki from English.

=== Pandanus (pandan) ===
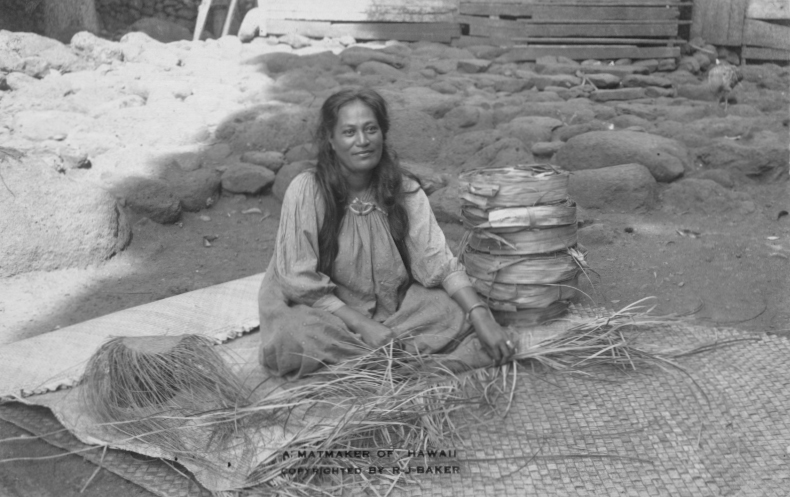
Woman using pandanus leaves in traditional weaving (lauhala) in Moloka'i, Hawaii (c. 1913)

Pandanus (Pandanus spp.) are very important cultivated plants in the Pacific, second only in importance and pervasiveness to coconuts. Every part of the plant is utilized, including for food, building materials, traditional medicine, and fiber and weaving materials in various cultures in Austronesia. The plants (particularly the fragrant flowers) also had spiritual significance among the native animist Austronesian religions.

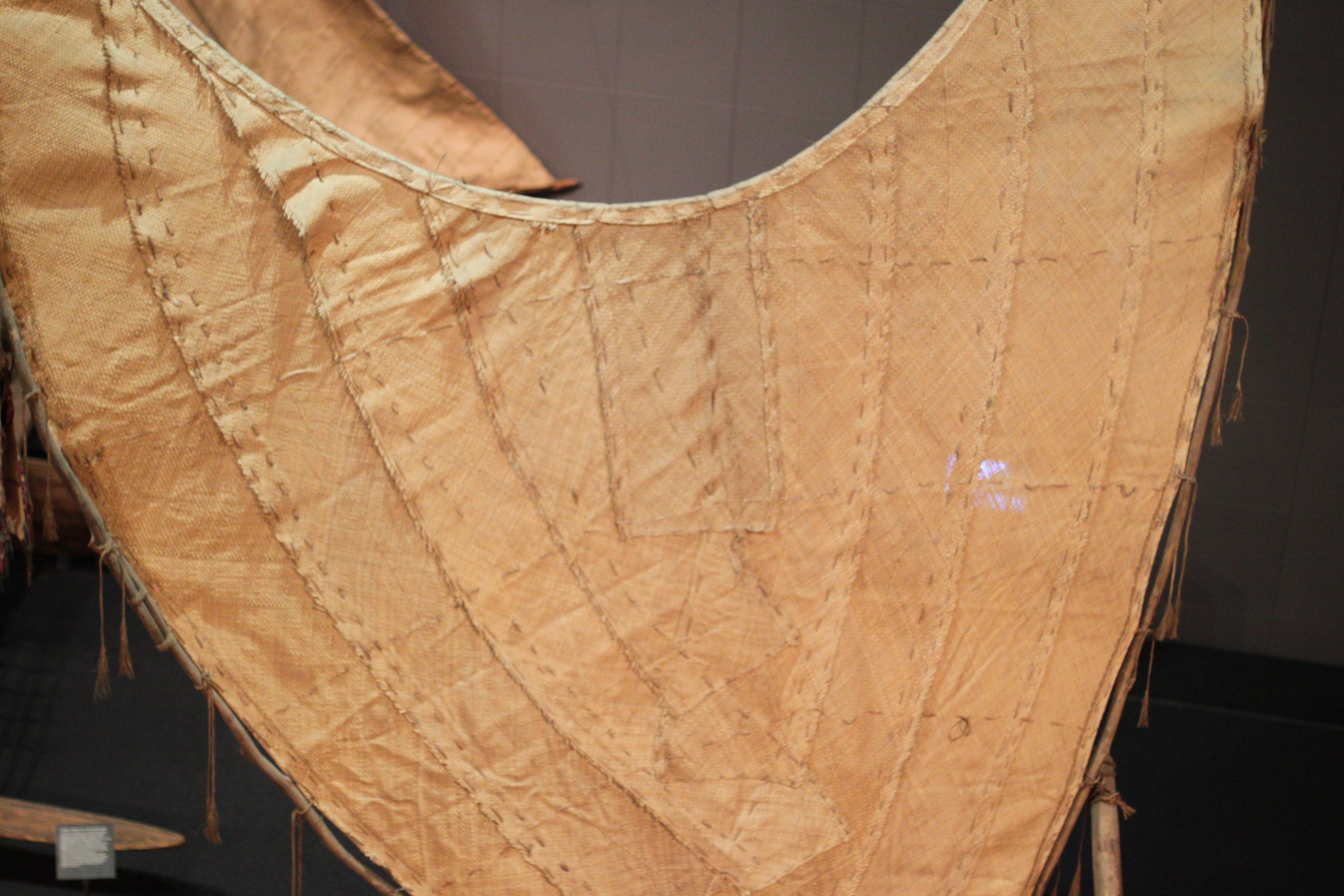
Crab claw sail woven from pandanus leaves on a tepukei, an ocean-going outrigger canoe from Temotu, Solomon Islands

Pandanus were also profoundly crucial in enabling the Austronesian expansion. Their leaves were traditionally woven into mats used in the sails for Austronesian outrigger ships. Sails allowed Austronesians to embark on long-distance voyaging. In some cases, however, they were one-way voyages. The failure of pandanus to establish populations in Easter Island and New Zealand is believed to have isolated their settlements from the rest of Polynesia.

The word for pandanus in Austronesian languages is derived from Proto-Austronesian *paŋudaN, which became Proto-Oceanic *padran and Proto-Polynesian *fara, the latter two usually referring specifically to Pandanus tectorius. Cognates in modern Austronesian languages include Kanakanavu pangətanə; Thao and Bunun panadan; Tagalog pandan; Chamorro pahong; Ratahan pondang; Malay pandan (from which the English name is derived); Manggarai pandang; Malagasy fandrana; Lau fada-da; Fijian vadra; Samoan fala; Tongan fā; Tahitian fara; Hawaiian hala; and Māori whara or hara. Note that among the Formosan languages of Indigenous Taiwanese, the meaning of the words have largely shifted to mean "pineapple", a physically similar non-native European-introduced plant. In Māori, as well, the meaning has shifted to Astelia spp. and Phormium tenax (harakeke), similar plants used for weaving, since pandanus did not survive the voyage into New Zealand.

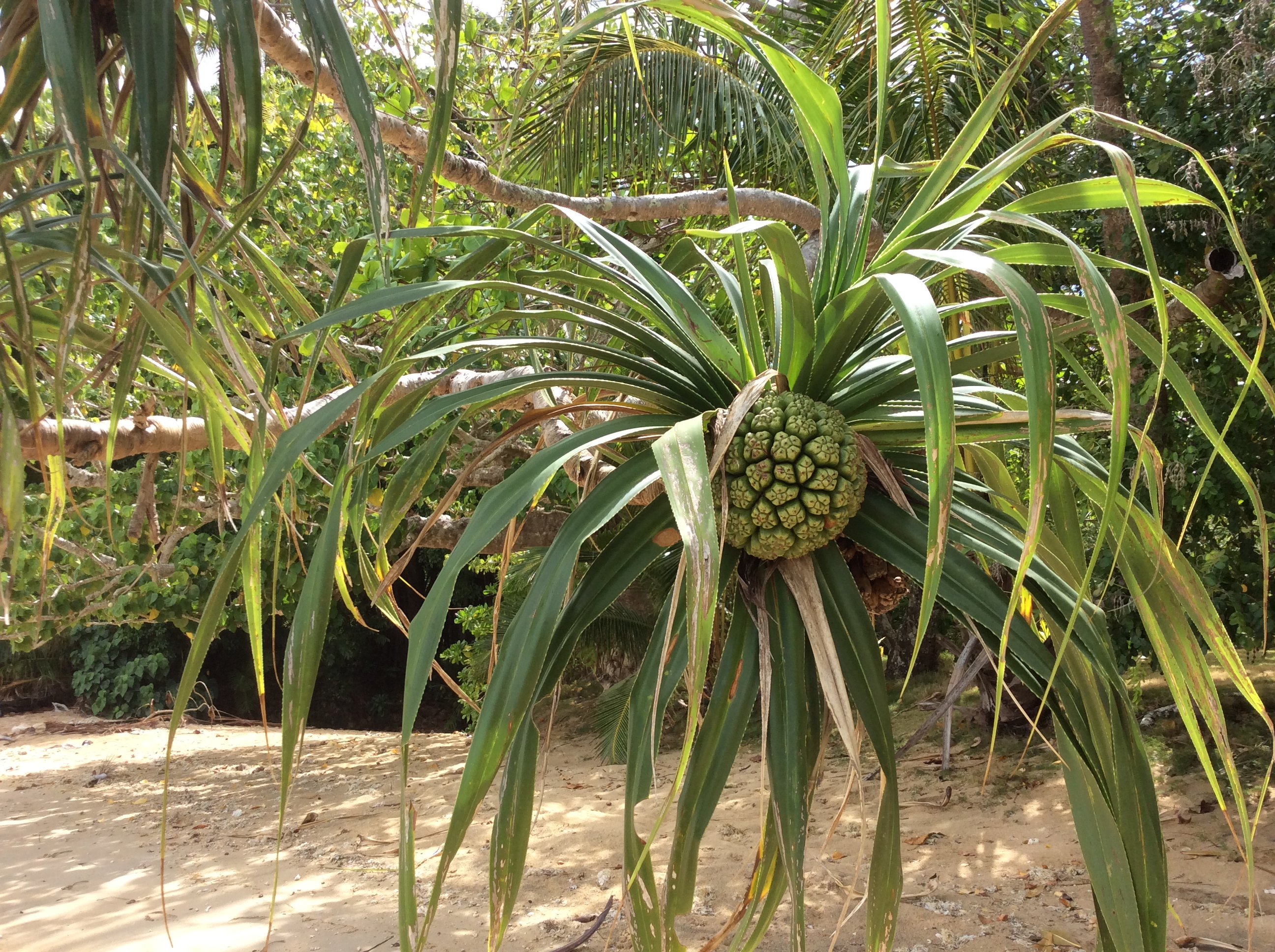
Pandanus tectorius with fruit in Beqa, Fiji

Pandanus grow well in island habitats, being very salt-tolerant and easy to propagate, making them ideal plants for early Austronesian sailors. Like coconuts, they grow predominantly along strandlines, mangrove forests, and other coastal ecosystems. They can also be found in the understory of forests in larger islands. Others may also be found in highland groves, likely planted by humans. Both pandanus and coconuts are adapted to withstand the strong winds of the frequent typhoons of the Indo-Pacific. The greatest center of diversity of Pandanus is the western Pacific and Maritime Southeast Asia. The genus has around 600 species, but the most important and the most widespread group of species in Austronesian cultures and is the Pandanus tectorius complex.

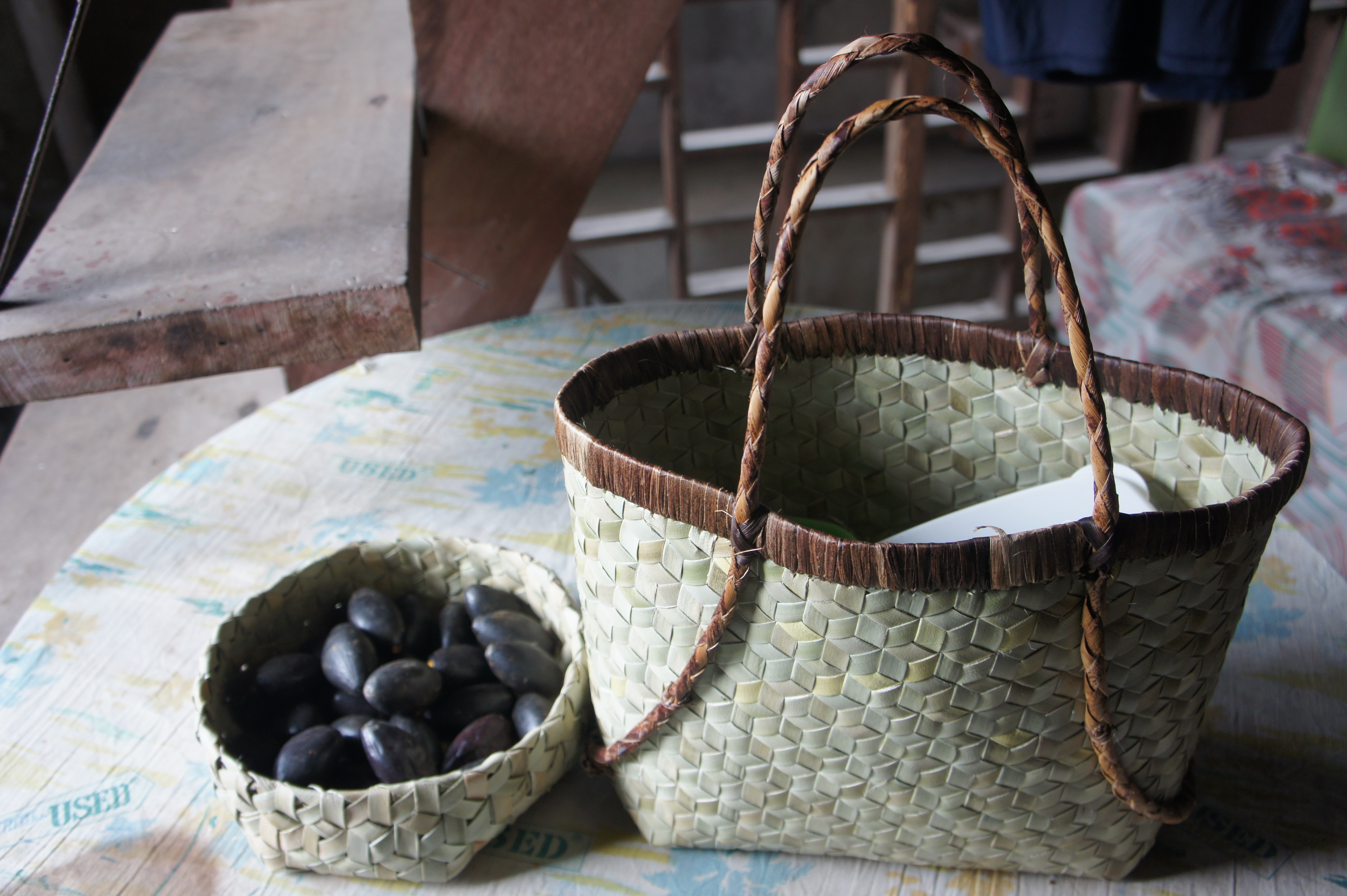
A bayong, a traditional Philippine basket woven from leaves of karagumoy (Pandanus simplex) in the hexagonal kinab-anan pattern

Pandanus tectorius in Oceania show evidence of long cultivations, with hundreds of different selectively bred cultivars which are primarily propagated through cuttings. These varieties often have different names in local languages and have different physical characteristics. The varieties are predominantly distinguished by the color and edibility of their fruit, but they may also be differentiated based on other criteria like the color and shape of their leaves used for weaving.

Very old fossils of Pandanus tectorius have been recovered from Hawaii, dated to more than 1.2 million years old. This indicates that the plants once colonized Hawaii (and likely the rest of the Pacific islands) naturally through their buoyant fruits. However, useful domesticated varieties were carried by Austronesians from island to island. Especially since wild pandanus have calcium oxalate crystals (raphides) in their fruit tissue. They cause itchiness and irritation when eaten raw and thus need to be cooked. Domesticated varieties which have less raphides (which are also usually less fibrous and more nutritious), were therefore valued . It is thus considered both native and introduced. There are also fossil evidence of pandanus fruits being harvested for food in New Guinea from archaeological sites dated to around 34,000 to 36,000 BP.

Other important species of pandanus utilized by Austronesians include Pandanus amaryllifolius, Pandanus odorifer, Pandanus furcatus, Pandanus julianettii, Pandanus simplex, Pandanus utilis, Pandanus dubius, and Pandanus whitmeeanus, among many others. Pandanus odorifer is widespread in the region from western Micronesia, to Maritime Southeast Asia and South Asia. It is possibly a subspecies of Pandanus tectorius and they hybridize readily. Pandanus amaryllifolius, the pandan, is another important species widely used as a spice in the cuisines of Southeast Asia for their vanilla-like fragrant leaves.

=== Piper (peppers) ===
Peppers (Piper) ancestrally cultivated by Austronesians include the betel (Piper betle), cubeb pepper (Piper cubeba), kava (Piper methysticum), and the Javanese long pepper (Piper retrofractum). Many others were also harvested from the wild for medicinal or religious purposes, including Piper caducibracteum, Piper excelsum, Piper ornatum, and Piper sarmentosum. Black pepper (Piper nigrum) and long pepper (Piper longum) were also extensively cultivated in Maritime Southeast Asia after early contact by Austronesian traders with South India and Sri Lanka.

==== Piper betle (betel) ====
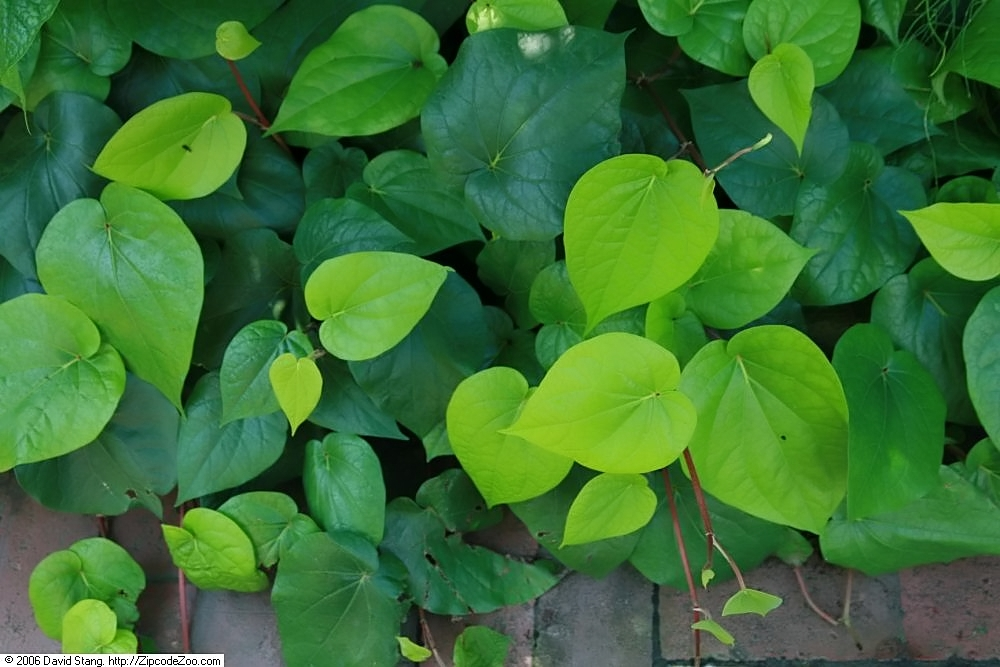
Betel vine

The betel (Piper betle) is one of the two plants that comprise the main ingredients of betel chewing, the other being the areca nut (Areca catechu). It is one of the most ubiquitous practices of the Austronesians. It is consumed by taking a leaf of betel, wrapping it around an areca nut and some lime (obtained from grinding seashells), and then chewing it for some time. It is a stimulant, inducing slight dizziness followed by euphoria and alertness. It is also highly addictive, damages the teeth and gums, and stains the teeth red.

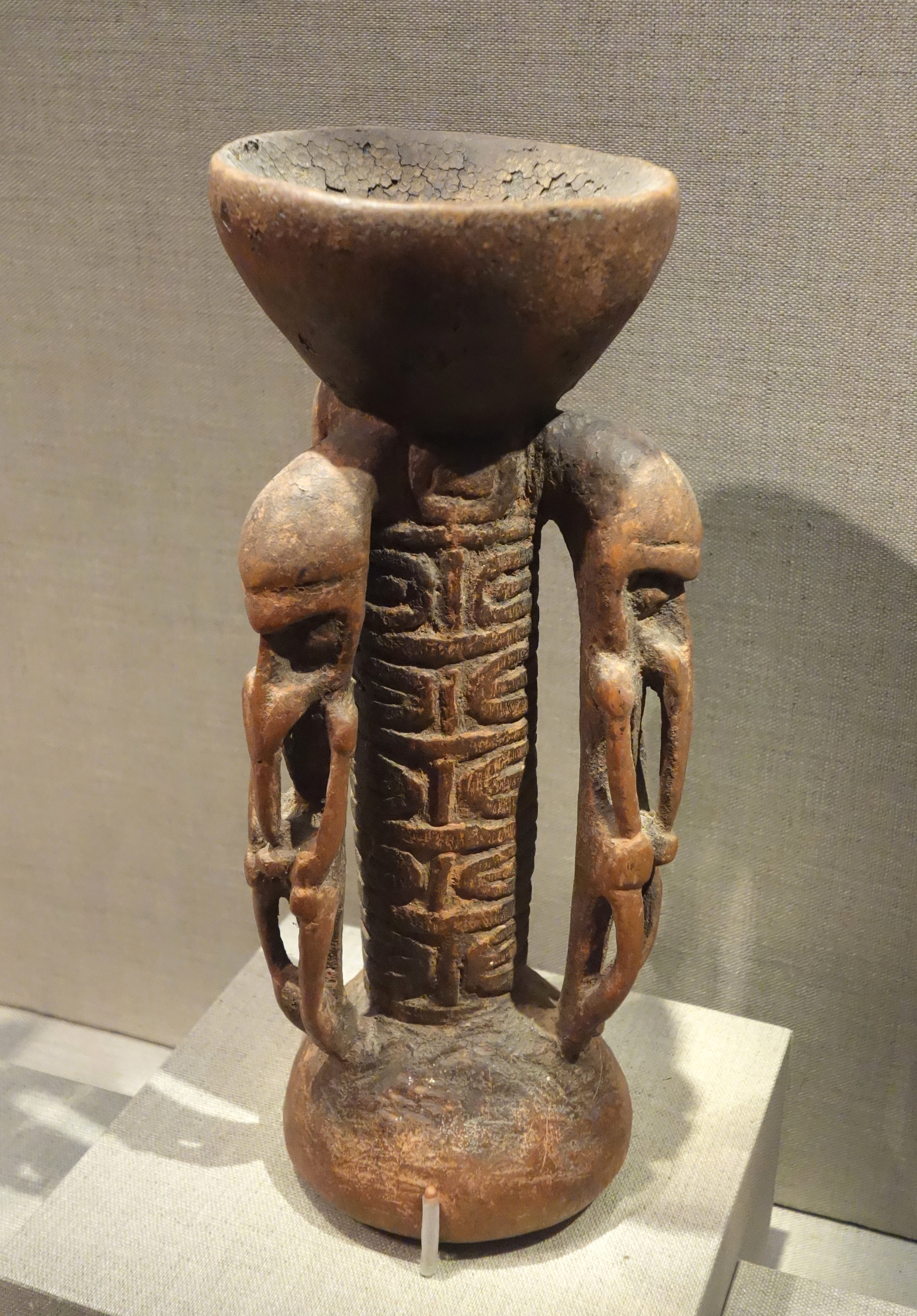
A betel mortar from Manam Motu, c. 1680 to 1890 CE

Based on archaeological, linguistic, and botanical evidence, betel chewing is most strongly associated with Austronesian cultures, despite its widespread adoption by neighboring cultures in prehistoric and historic times. The original range of betel is unknown, but Areca catechu is known to be originally native to the Philippines, where it has the greatest morphological diversity as well as the most number of closely related endemic species. It is unknown when the two were combined, as areca nut alone can be chewed for its narcotic properties. In eastern Indonesia, however, leaves from the wild Piper caducibracteum (known as sirih hutan) are also harvested and used in place of betel leaves.

The oldest unequivocal evidence of betel chewing is from the Philippines. Specifically that of several individuals found in a burial pit in the Duyong Cave site of Palawan island dated to around 4,630±250 BP . The dentition of the skeletons are stained, typical of betel chewers. The grave also includes Anadara shells used as containers of lime, one of which still contained lime. Burial sites in Bohol dated to the first millennium CE also show the distinctive reddish stains characteristic of betel chewing. Based on linguistic evidence of how the reconstructed Proto-Austronesian term *buaq originally meaning "fruit" came to refer to "areca nut" in Proto-Malayo-Polynesian, it is believed that betel chewing originally developed somewhere within the Philippines shortly after the beginning of the Austronesian expansion (~5,000 BP). From the Philippines, it spread back to Taiwan, as well as onwards to the rest of Austronesia.

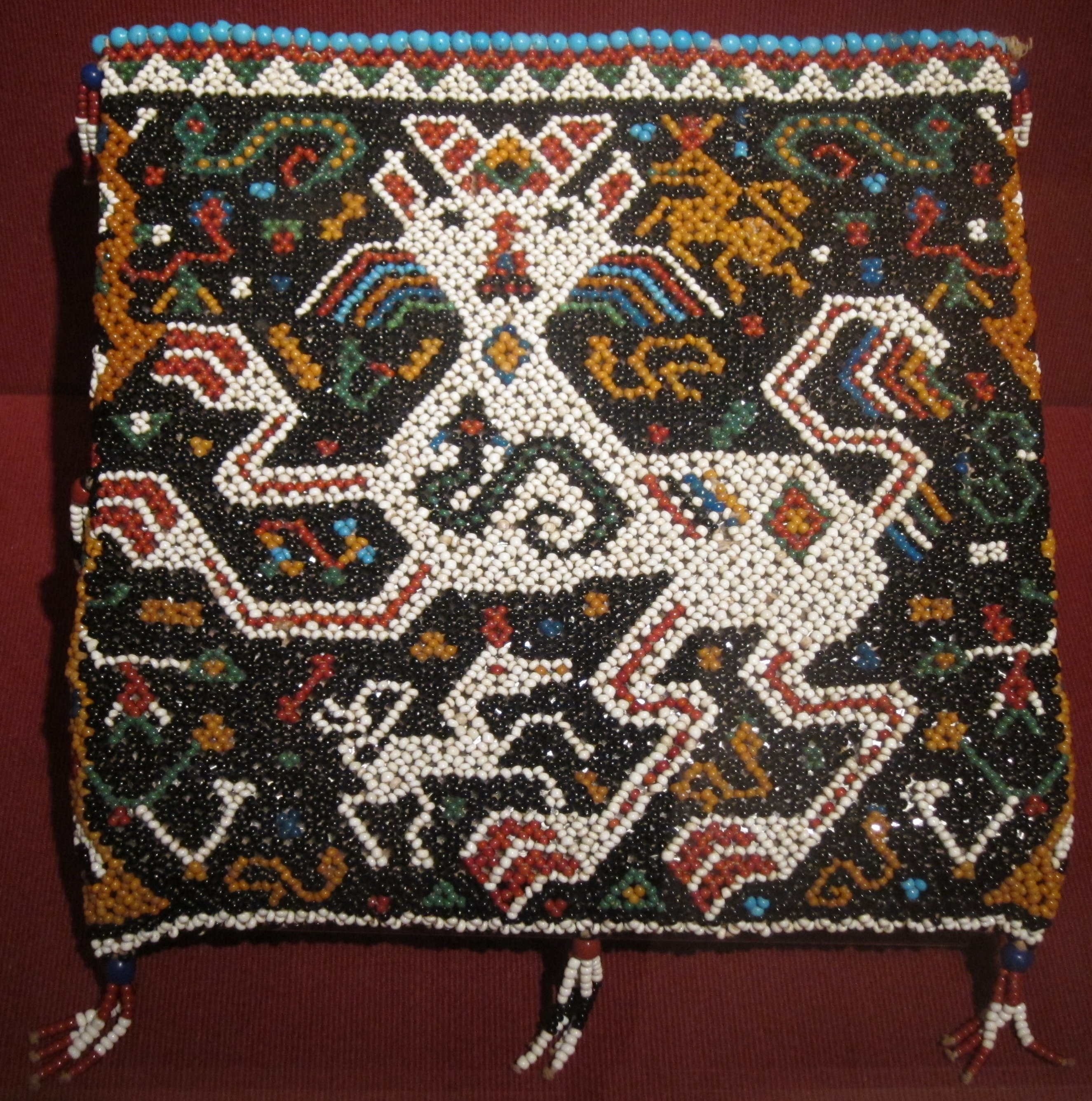
Royal ceremonial betel bag (pahapa), East Sumba, Kingdom of Kapunduk, early 20th century

It reached Micronesia at around 3,500 to 3,000 BP with the Austronesian voyagers, based on both linguistic and archaeological evidence. It was also previously present in the Lapita culture, based on archaeological remains from Mussau dated to around 3,600 to 2,500 BP. But it did not reach Polynesia further east. It is believed that it stopped in the Solomon Islands due to the replacement of betel chewing with the tradition of kava drinking prepared from the related Piper methysticum. It was also diffused into East Africa via the Austronesian settlement of Madagascar and the Comoros by around the 7th century.

The practice also diffused to the cultures the Austronesians had historical contact with. It reached South Asia by 3,500 BP, through early contact of Austronesian traders from Sumatra, Java, and the Malay Peninsula with the Dravidian-speakers of Sri Lanka and southern India. This also coincides with the introduction of Southeast Asian plants like Santalum album and Cocos nucifera, as well as the adoption of the Austronesian outrigger ship and crab-claw sail technologies by Dravidian-speakers. It Mainland Southeast Asia by 3,000 to 2,500 BP through trade with Borneo, as well as the settlement of the Champa polities in southern Vietnam. From there, it was spread northwards into China. Lastly, it reached Northern India by 500 BP through trade in the Bay of Bengal. From there it was spread westwards into Persia and the Mediterranean.

There are very old claims of betel chewing dating to at least 13,000 BP at the Kuk Swamp site in New Guinea, based on probable Areca sp. recovered. However, it is now known that these might have been due to modern contamination of sample materials. Similar claims have also been made at other older sites with Areca sp. remains, but none can be conclusively identified as A. carechu and their association with betel peppers is tenuous or nonexistent.

There are numerous cognate sets reconstructible in Austronesian languages relating to various aspects of betel chewing. Ranging from chewing something without swallowing to equipment used to climb areca nut palms to the betel spittle. One cognate set that can be reconstructed for betel pepper is Proto-Western Malayo-Polynesian *Rawed which became Proto-Philippine *gawed, with cognates including Yami gaod, Itbayaten gawed; Ilocano gawéd; Isneg khawád; Casiguran Dumagat gawə́d; and Ibaloy kawed; Balangaw lawɨ'd; Kalagan lawód; and Kenyah auat or awet.

Two other cognate sets reached into Oceania. The first is Proto-Malayo-Polynesian *pu-pulu, which became Proto-Oceanic *[pu-]pulu. Cognates include Mussau ulo; Loniu pun; Bipi pun or puepun; Lukep ul; Takia ful; Gedaged fu; Manam ulusalaga; and Bugotu vu-vulu. The other is Proto-Meso-Melanesian *siqa(r,R)(a), with cognates including Kara and Lihir sie; Tabar sia; Patpatar sier; Tolai ier; Nehan hiara; Petats sil; Teop hia(kuru); Tinputz (ta)sian; Banoni siɣana; and Marovo hirata.

==== Piper cubeba (cubeb pepper) ====
The cubeb pepper (Piper cubeba) are native to Maritime Southeast Asia. Like Piper retrofractum, however, it was only cultivated extensively in the Greater Sunda Islands for the spice trade. The Javanese protected the monopoly of the trade by sterilizing the seeds before trading them. It has a pungent smell, often compared to allspice, quite unlike that of the other culinary peppers. It also has a slightly bitter taste. It is notable as having reached as far as Greece during ancient times via the Silk Road. It was a valuable rare spice in Medieval Europe and the Middle East, reputed to have medicinal and magical properties. Medieval Arab physicians commonly used it for a range of treatments, ranging from treating infertility to poison antidotes. It is mentioned in The Book of One Thousand and One Nights as well as in the travelogues of Marco Polo. Its trade waned during the Colonial Era when the Portuguese Empire banned its importation to promote the black pepper produced by its own colonies.

==== Piper excelsum (kawakawa) ====
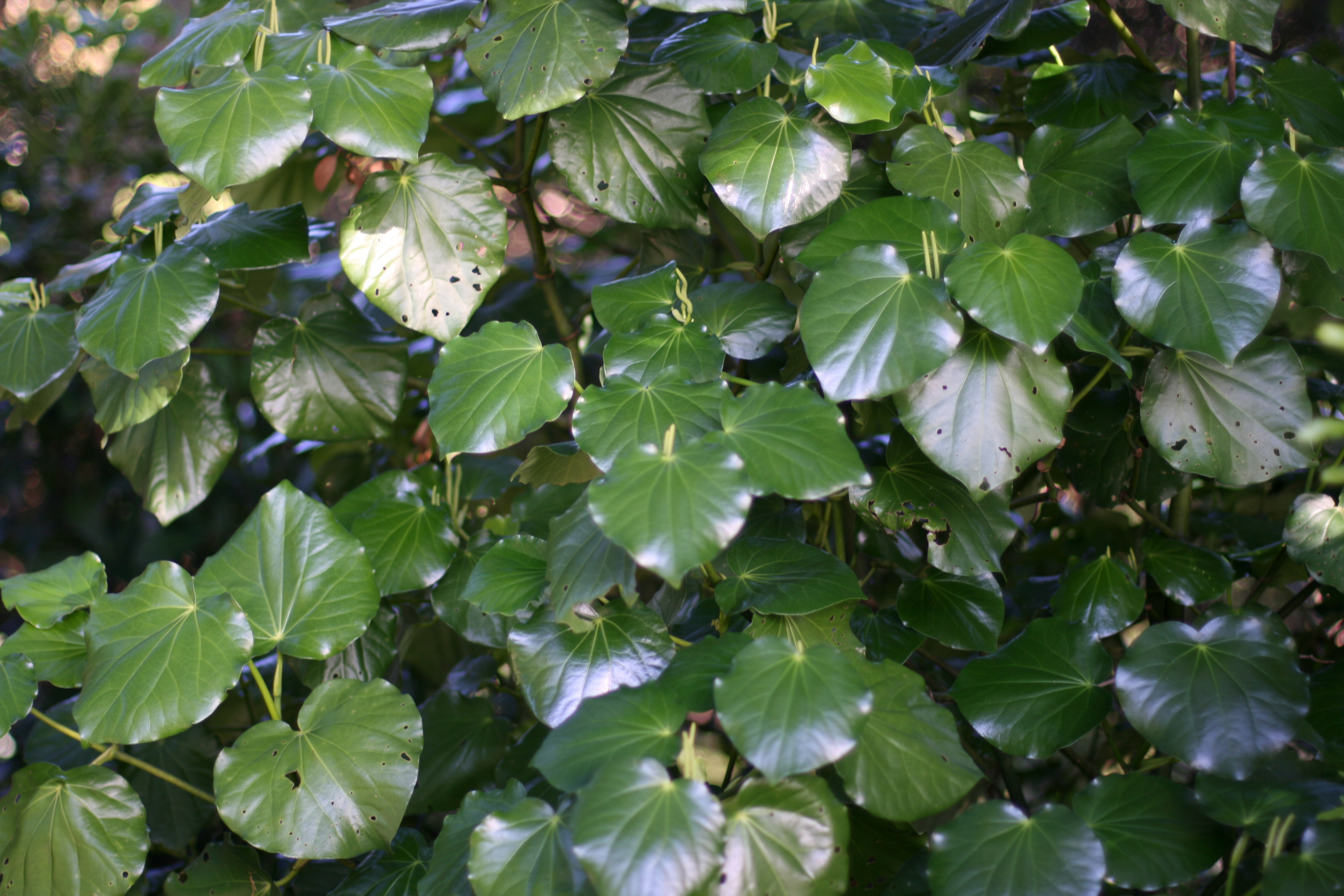
Kawakawa in Auckland, New Zealand

Kawakawa (Piper excelsum) is a small tree or shrub endemic to New Zealand and nearby Norfolk Island and Lord Howe Island. It was exploited by Austronesian settlers based on previous knowledge of the kava, as the latter could not survive in the colder climates of New Zealand. The Māori name for the plant, kawakawa, is derived from the same etymon as kava, but reduplicated. It is a sacred tree among the Māori people. It is seen as a symbol of death, corresponding to the rangiora (Brachyglottis repanda) which is the symbol of life. Boughs of kawakawa are often used in purification rituals.

However, kawakawa's resemblance to true kava is only superficial. Kawakawa roots do not have psychoactive properties. Instead, kawakawa's primary use is for traditional medicine.

==== Piper methysticum (kava) ====
Kava (Piper methysticum) is a small tree or shrub believed to have been domesticated in either New Guinea or Vanuatu by Papuans. It is believed to be a domesticated variety of Piper subbullatum which is native to New Guinea and the Philippines.

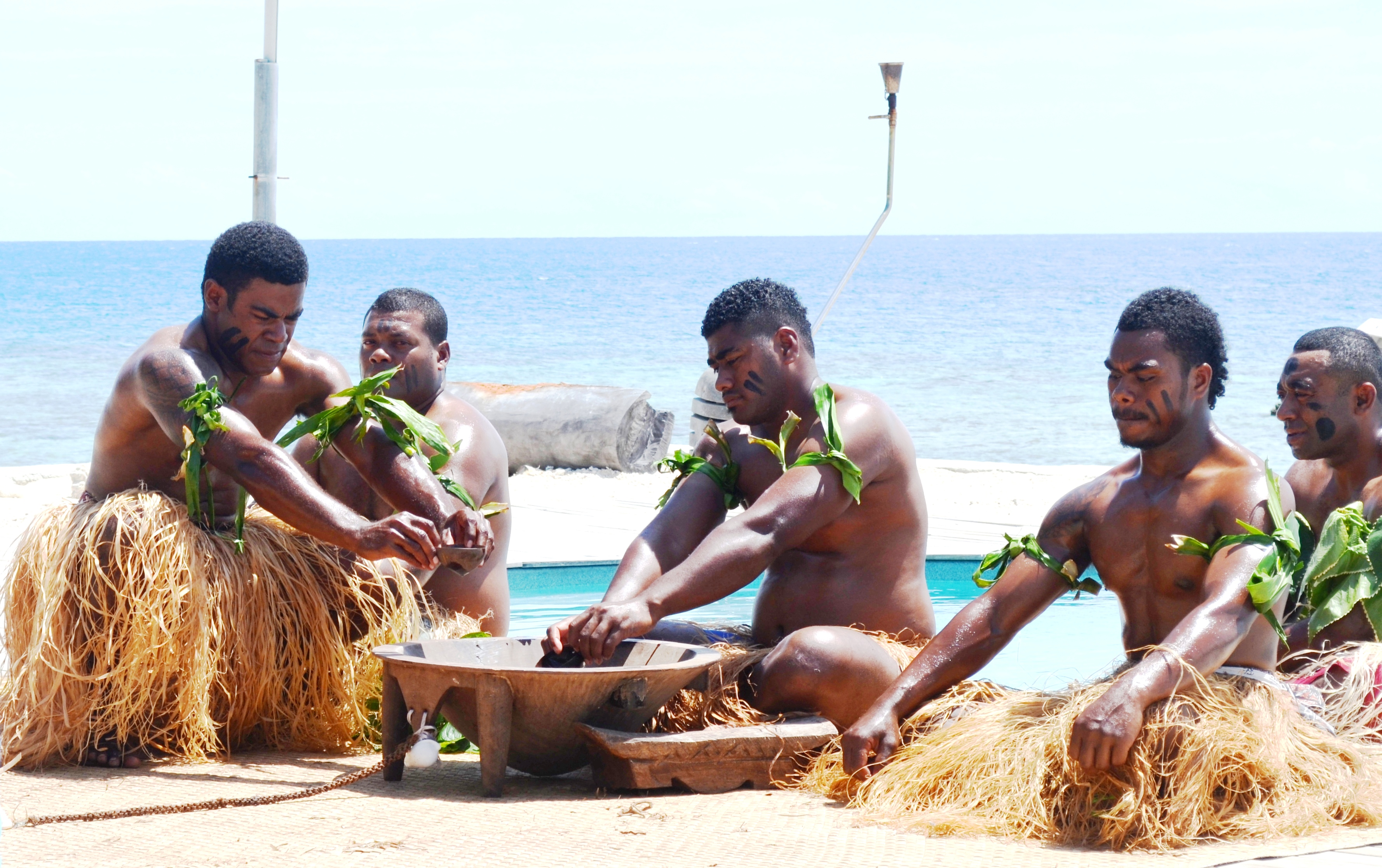
Traditional kava preparation ceremony in Fiji

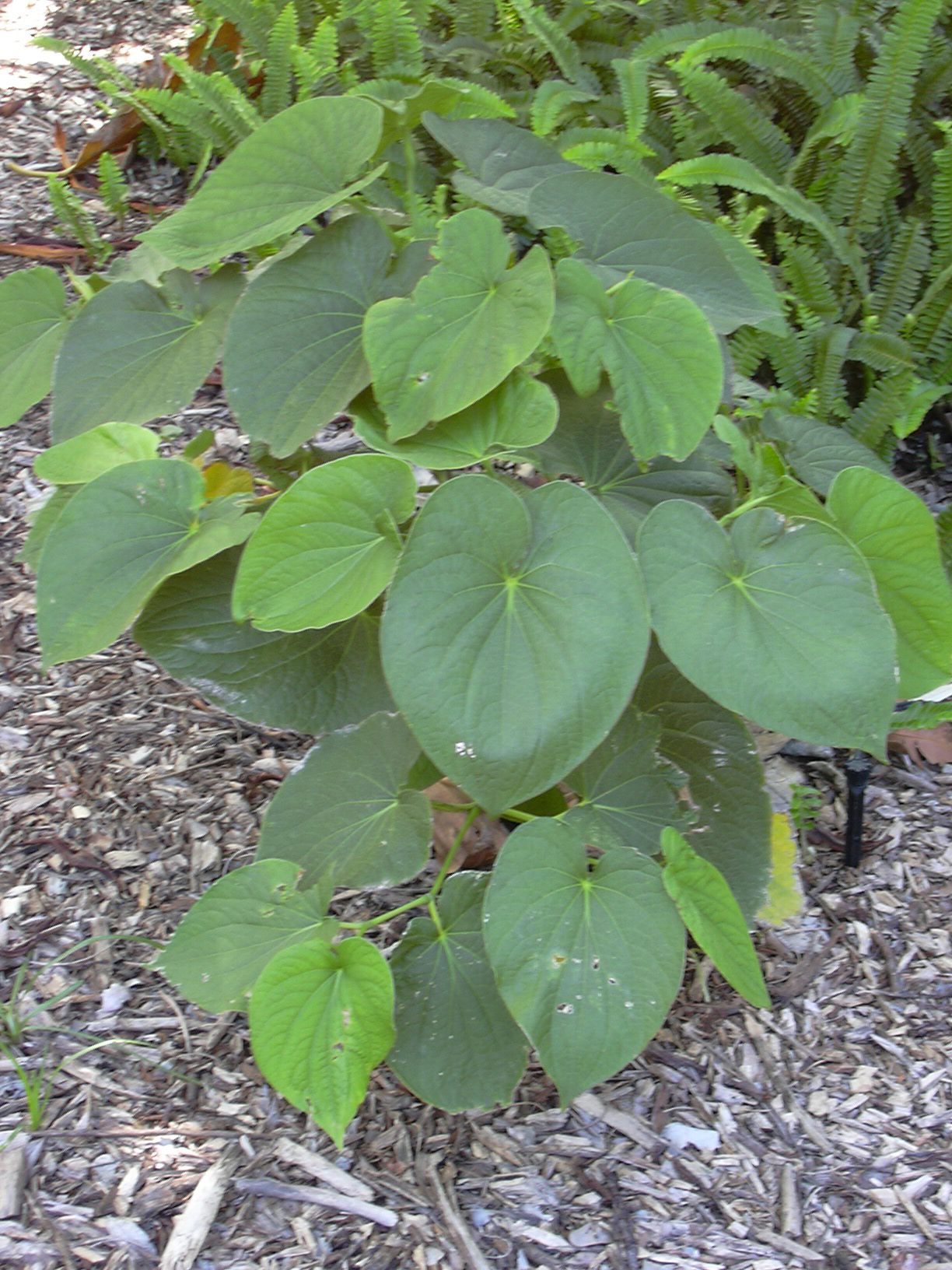
Kava plant in Maui

It was spread by Austronesians after contact into the rest of Polynesia. It is endemic to Oceania and is not found in other Austronesian groups. Kava has great cultural and religious significance among Polynesians. The roots are pounded and mixed with water then strained through fibers. The resulting cloudy gray liquid is bitter with mildly psychoactive and narcotic properties, with a common effect being numbness around the lips and mouth. However, it is not hallucinogenic or addictive. The potency of the root depends on the age of the plants. The leaves and roots can also be chewed directly resulting in a numbing effect and relaxation. It is traditionally consumed both in everyday social interactions and in religious rituals. Kava reached Hawaii, but it is absent in New Zealand where it can not grow.

Consumption of kava is also believed to be the reason why betel chewing, ubiquitous elsewhere, was lost for Austronesians in Oceania.

According to Lynch (2002), the reconstructed Proto-Polynesian term for the plant, *kava, was derived from the Proto-Oceanic term *kawaRi in the sense of a "bitter root" or "potent root [used as fish poison]". It originally referred to Zingiber zerumbet, which was used to make a similar mildly psychoactive bitter drink in Austronesian rituals. Cognates for *kava include Pohnpeian sa-kau; Tongan, Niue, Rapa Nui, Tuamotuan, and Rarotongan kava; Samoan and Marquesan ʻava; and Hawaiian ʻawa. In some languages, most notably Māori kawa, the cognates have come to mean "bitter", "sour", or "acrid" to the taste.

In the Cook Islands, the reduplicated forms of kawakawa or kavakava are also applied to the unrelated members of the genus Pittosporum. And in other languages like in Futunan, compound terms like kavakava atua refer to other species belonging to the genus Piper. The reduplication of the base form is indicative of falsehood or likeness, in the sense of "false kava".

==== Piper retrofractum (Javanese long pepper) ====
The Javanese long pepper (Piper retrofractum) is native to Maritime Southeast Asia from the Philippines to Sumatra. Its northern range also extends to southern China, mainland Southeast Asia, Taiwan, and the Ryukyu Islands. However it was historically only cultivated in any great extent in the islands of Java and Bali, and surrounding islands, for the spice trade. Elsewhere it is mostly grown informally in the backyards of houses. It is very similar to the Indian long pepper (Piper longum) and is used in the same way in Southeast Asian cuisine.

=== Saccharum (sugarcane) ===
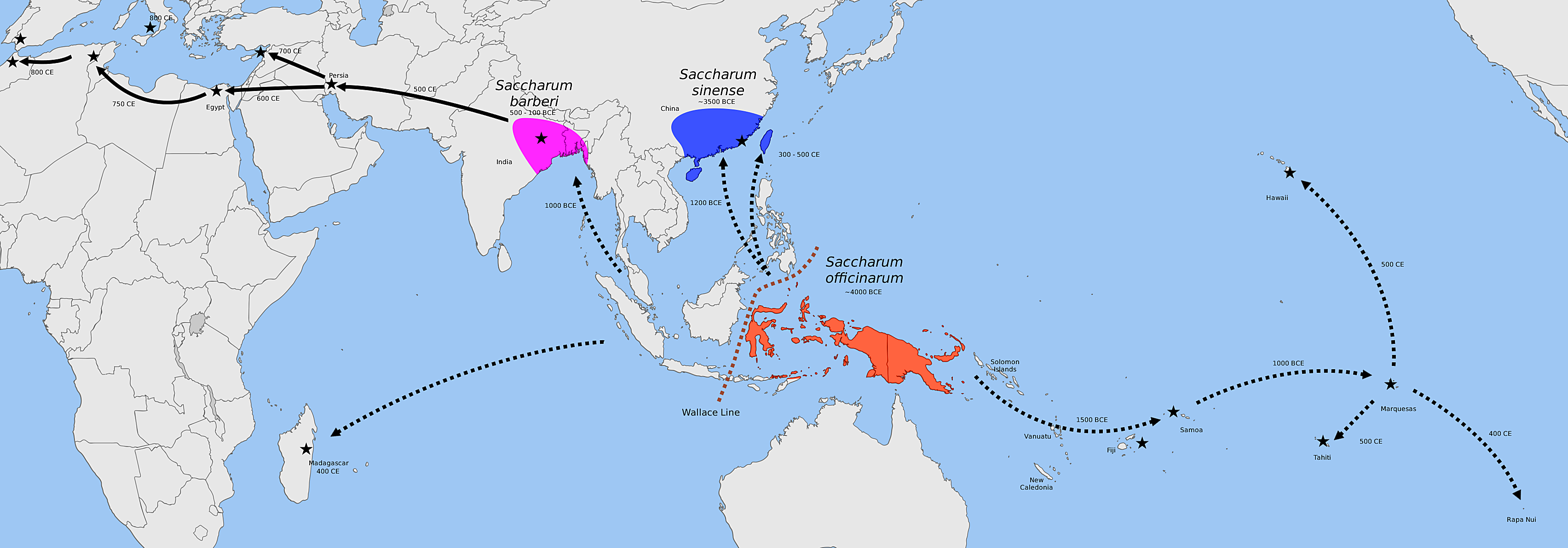
Map showing centers of origin of Saccharum officinarum in New Guinea, S. sinensis in southern China and Taiwan, and S. barberi in India; dotted arrows represent Austronesian introductions

There are two centers of domestication for sugarcane (Saccharum spp.): one for Saccharum officinarum by Papuans in New Guinea and another for Saccharum sinense by Austronesians in Taiwan and southern China. Papuans and Austronesians originally primarily used sugarcane as food for domesticated pigs. The spread of both S. officinarum and S. sinense is closely linked to the migrations of the Austronesian peoples.

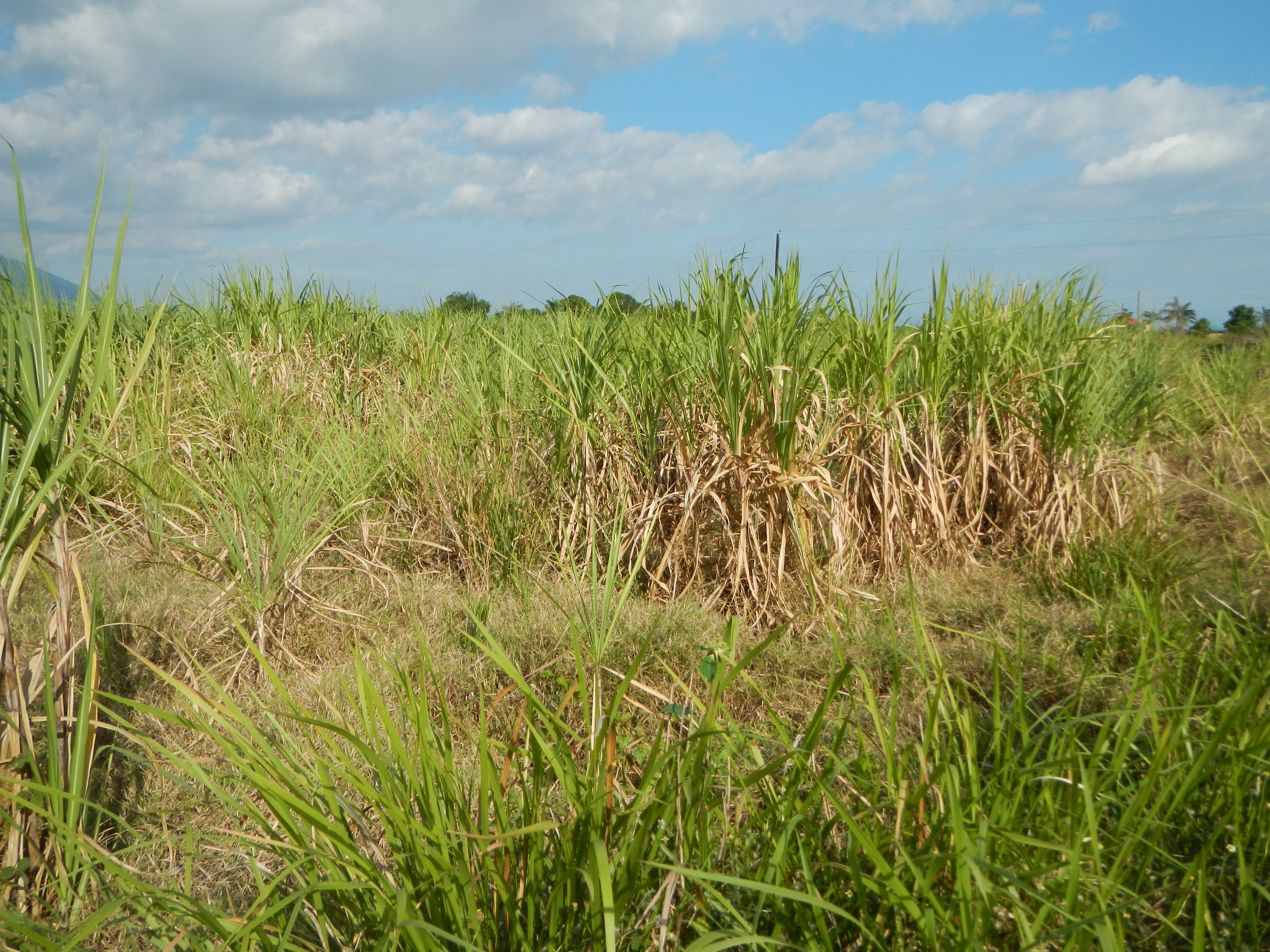
Sugarcane field in Pampanga, Philippines

Saccharum officinarum was first domesticated in New Guinea and the islands east of the Wallace Line by Papuans, where it is the modern center of diversity. Beginning at around 6,000 BP they were selectively bred from the native Saccharum robustum. From New Guinea it spread westwards to Maritime Southeast Asia after contact with Austronesians, where it hybridized with Saccharum spontaneum.

The second domestication center is mainland southern China and Taiwan where S. sinense (though other authors identify it as S. spontaneum) was one of the original major crops of the Austronesian peoples from at least 5,500 BP. Introduction of the sweeter S. officinarum may have gradually replaced it throughout its cultivated range in Maritime Southeast Asia. From Maritime Southeast Asia, S. officinarum was spread eastward into Polynesia and Micronesia by Austronesian voyagers as a canoe plant by around 3,500 BP. It was also spread westward and northward by around 3,000 BP to China and India by Austronesian traders, where it further hybridized with Saccharum sinense and Saccharum barberi. From there it spread further into western Eurasia and the Mediterranean.

The reconstructed word for "sugarcane" in Proto-Austronesian is *CəbuS or *təbuS, which became Proto-Malayo-Polynesian *təbuh, Proto-Oceanic *topu, and Proto-Polynesian *to. Modern cognates include Hoanya and Bunun sibus; Rukai cobosə or tibóso; Tagalog tubó; Chamorro tupu; Murik Kayan tebu; Malay tebu; Old Sundanese teuwu; Modern Sundanese tiwu; Ansus tobu; Malmariv tov; Fijian dovu; Mele-Fila and Takuu toro; Samoan tolo; Tagula ro; Pohnpeian cheu; Tahitian to; Pukapukan, Rarotongan, and Tongan tō; Hawaiian kō; and Rapa Nui to or ta. In Malagasy, however, the word for "sugarcane" is fary, which is instead derived from Proto-Austronesian *pajey, meaning "rice".

=== Santalum album (sandalwood) ===
Santalum album is originally native to dry areas in Indonesia (Java and the Lesser Sunda Islands), the Philippines, and Western Australia, where it is found with close congeners. It was introduced very early (c. 1500 BCE) into Dravidian regions of South Asia via the Austronesian maritime spice trade, along with other Austronesian domesticates like areca nut and coconuts. It first appears in archaeological records in South Asia in the southern Deccan by 1300 BCE. It became naturalized in these regions where dry sandy soils are common.

=== Solanum ===
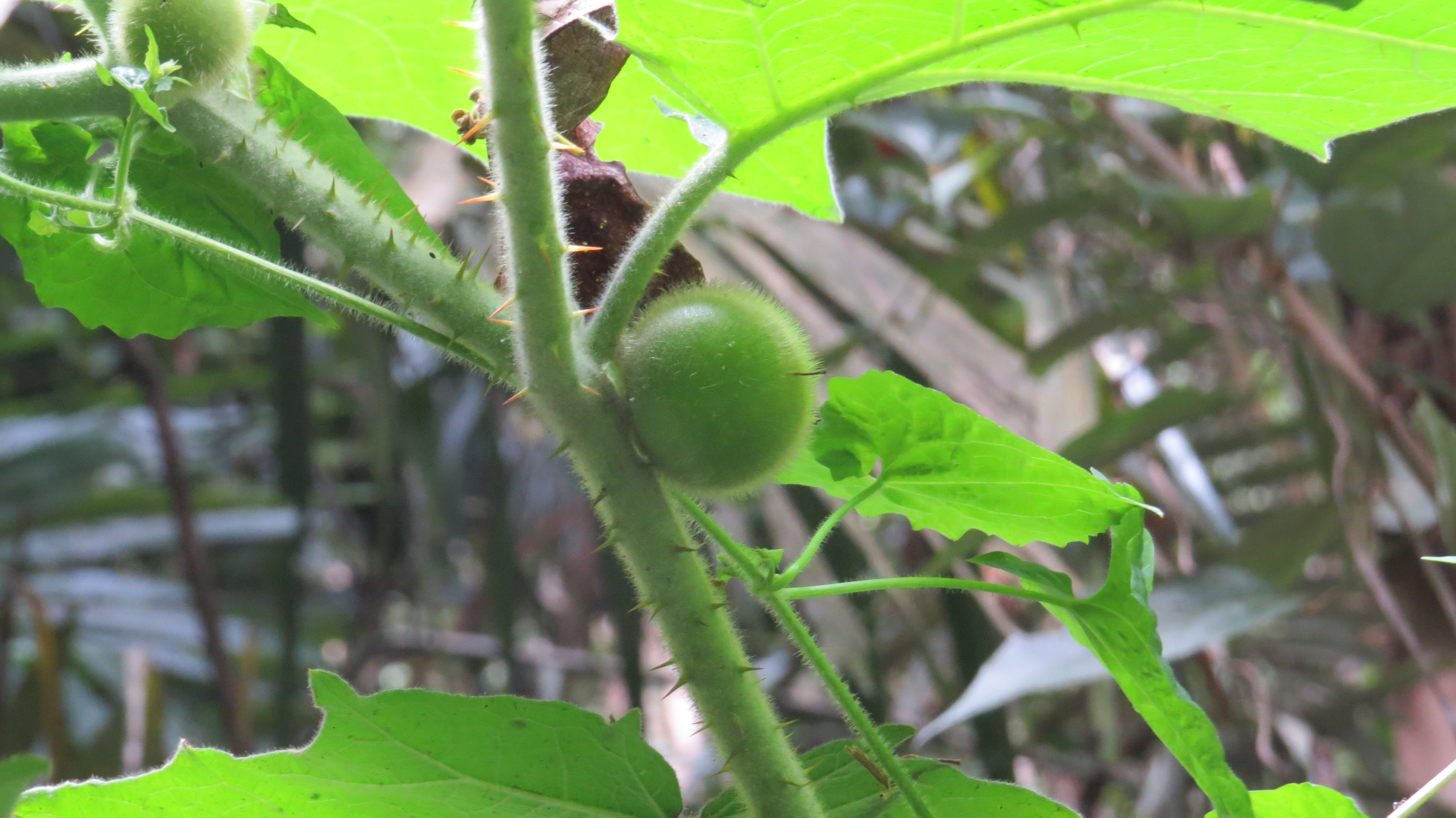
Indian nightshade in Alakode

Several species of Solanum have been utilised as food and medicine by the Austronesian people. Species cultivated include Kangaroo apple (Solanum aviculare), poroporo (Solanum laciniatum), Indian nightshade (Solanum lasiocarpum), pacific tomato (Solanum repandum) and cannibal tomato (Solanum viride); almost all of their vernacular names consist of slight variations on the name poro or polo.

=== Spondias dulcis (Polynesian plum) ===
Spondias dulcis is native to Melanesia but it was spread to neighboring regions in Maritime Southeast Asia and Polynesia by Austronesians.

Its name is reconstructed by Robert Blust in Proto-Central–Eastern Malayo-Polynesian as *quRi, and by Malcolm Ross as Proto-Oceanic *quRis.

It remains widely cultivated in Polynesia, where it is generally known under the names vī or wī, and variants thereof. It is also known as uli, uri, or kuli in various languages in Melanesia. In the Philippines, it is known as hevi.

=== Syzygium ===
Trees in the genus Syzygium contain some of the most important fruit trees among Austronesian peoples. Species cultivated or harvested for their edible fruit include the Java plum (Syzygium cumini), jambos (Syzygium jambos), lubeg (Syzygium lineatum), swamp maire (Syzygium maire), mountain apple (Syzygium malaccense), lipote (Syzygium polycephaloides), and the Java apple (Syzygium samarangense), among others. Two species are also important sources of spice: the clove tree (Syzygium aromaticum) and Indonesian bay leaf (Syzygium polyanthum).

==== Syzygium aromaticum (cloves) ====
Until the colonial era, cloves only grew on a few islands in the Moluccas (historically called the Spice Islands), including Bacan, Makian, Moti, Ternate, and Tidore. One clove tree named Afo that experts believe is the oldest in the world on Ternate may be 350–400 years old.

Cloves were first traded by the Austronesian peoples in the Austronesian maritime trade network (which began around 1500 BC, later becoming the Maritime Silk Road and part of the Spice Trade). The first notable example of modern clove farming developed on the east coast of Madagascar, and is cultivated in three separate ways, a monoculture, agricultural parklands, and agroforestry systems.

==== Syzygium malaccense (mountain apple) ====
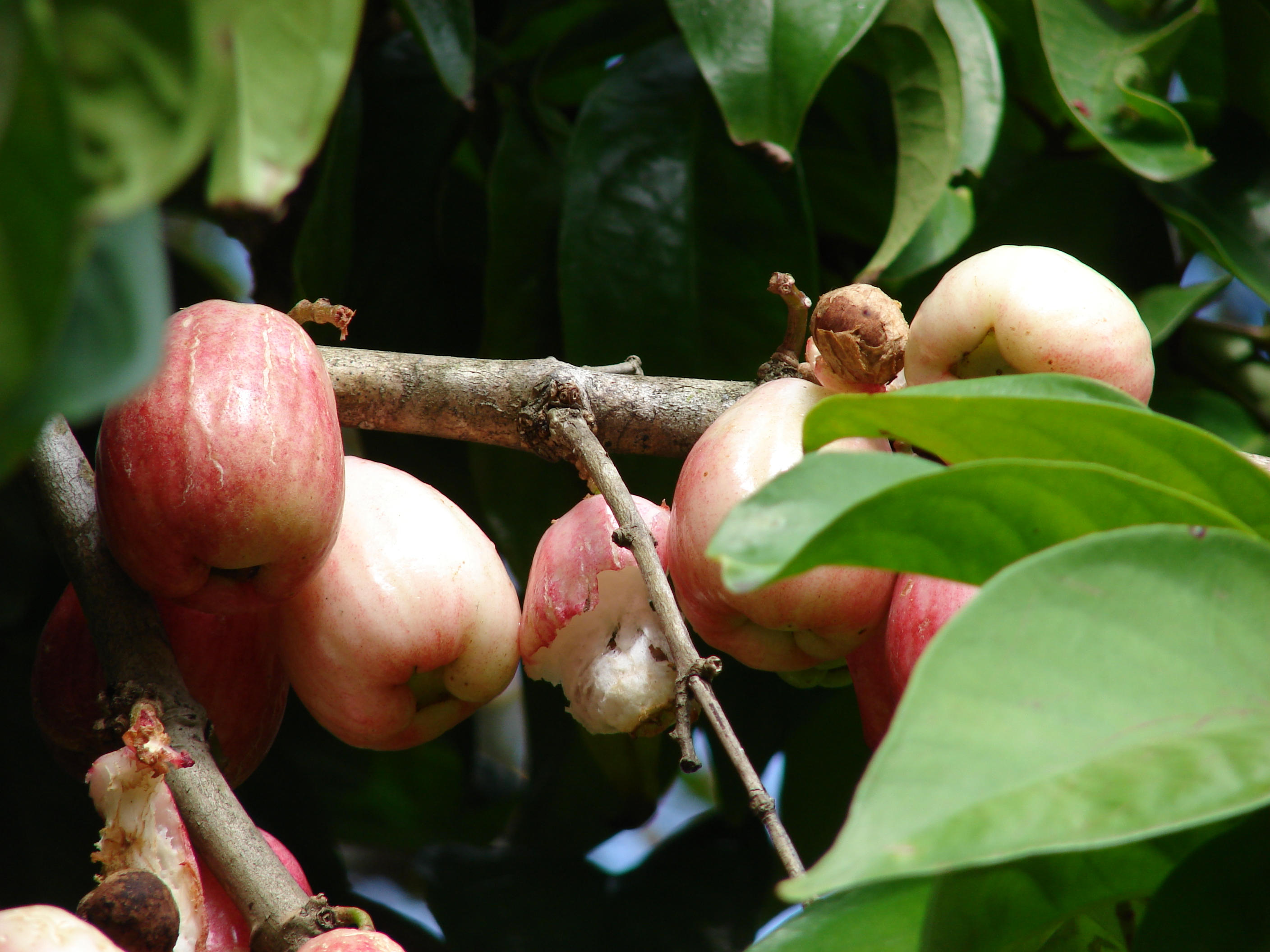
Mountain apples in Maui

The mountain apple (Syzygium malaccense) along with the closely related species like the water apple (Syzygium aqueum) and the Java apple (Syzygium samarangense), are native throughout Maritime Southeast Asia and were cultivated since prehistory. They were all carried by Austronesians into the Pacific and planted deliberately.

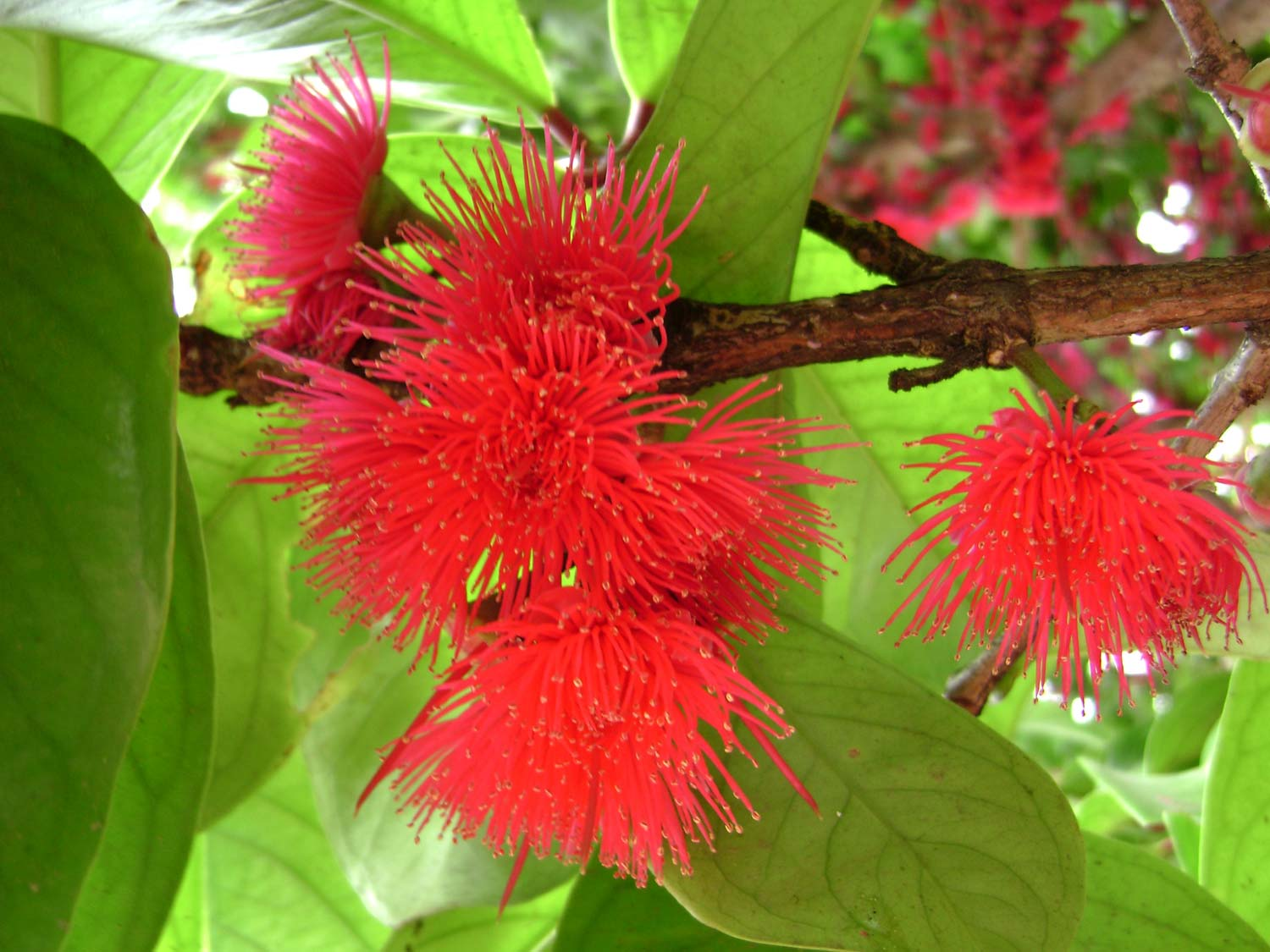
Mountain apple in bloom in Tonga

They were valued primarily for their abundant edible fruits. It is also used for timber (usually for building houses) and parts of the trees are used in traditional medicine. The attractive flowers are also worn as personal hair adornments and in making leis. They were primarily propagated through cuttings by Melanesians and Polynesians. The groves of mountain apples found in the Pacific are often remnants of ancient plantings, as the seeds of the fruits are too large to be dispersed by the native birds. Related species endemic to the Pacific Islands were also utilized similarly, like Syzygium corynocarpum and Syzygium neurocalyx.

There numerous names for mountain apples in Austronesian languages. In the Philippines, the terms can be reconstructed to Proto-Philippine *makúpa, with cognates including Ilocano, Aklanon, and Cebuano makúpa; and Tagalog and Bikol makópa.

In Oceania, there are several cognate sets reconstructible for mountain apples and related species. Four of which are *pokaq, *marisapa, *sakau and *cay, with limited reflexes and may have originally referred to other species. The most widespread cognate set, however, can be reconstructed to Proto-Oceanic *kapika. Its cognates include Mussau kaviu; Seimat ahi, Lou keik; Maenge and Nakanai gaiva; Tami kapig; Yabem àing; Motu gavika; Bola kavika; Babatana kapika; Gela gaviga; Kwara'ae ʻafiʻo; Paamese ahie; Wayan, Niue, East Uvean, and Bauan kavika; Tongan fekika; Anutan kapika; Marquesan kehika; Mangarevan keʻika; Tahitian ʻahiʻa; Hawaiian ʻoohiaʻai; Rarotongan kaʻika; and Māori kahika. In Māori, the names have shifted to Metrosideros fulgens, which have similar-looking flowers, as Malay apples did not survive into New Zealand.

=== Tacca leontopetaloides (Polynesian arrowroot) ===
Polynesian arrowroot (Tacca leontopetaloides) is another ancient Austronesian root crop closely related to yams. It is originally native to Maritime Southeast Asia. It was introduced throughout the entire range of the Austronesian expansion, including Micronesia, Polynesia, and Madagascar. Polynesian arrowroot have been identified as among the cultivated crops in Lapita sites in Palau, dating back to 3,000 to 2,000 BP. It was also introduced to Sri Lanka, southern India, and possibly also Australia through trade and contact.

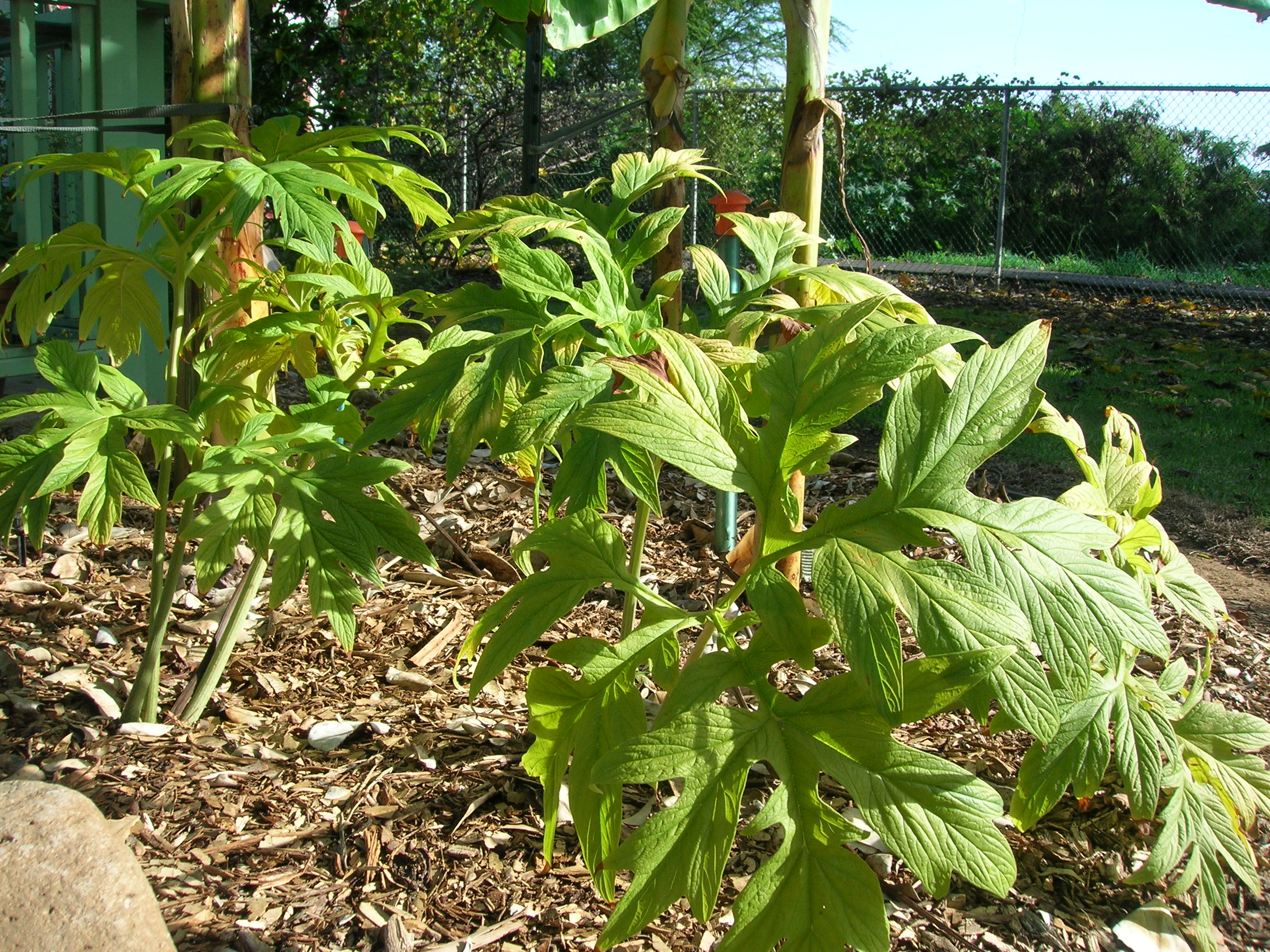
Polynesian arrowroot in Maui

Polynesian arrowroot was a minor staple among Austronesians. The roots are bitter if not prepared properly, thus it was only cultivated as a secondary crop to staples like Dioscorea alata and Colocasia esculenta. Its importance increased for settlers in the Pacific Islands, where food plants were scarcer, and it was introduced to virtually all the inhabited islands. They were valued for their ability to grow in low islands and atolls, and were often the staple crops in islands with these conditions. In larger islands, they were usually allowed to grow feral and were useful only as famine food. Several cultivars have been developed in Polynesia due to the thousands of years of artificial selection. The starch extracted from the root with traditional methods can last for a very long time, and thus can be stored or traded. The starch can be cooked in leaves to make starchy puddings. Due to the introduction of modern crops, it is rarely cultivated today.

The names for Polynesian arrowroot in Austronesian languages reflect its secondary importance as a crop. They are often reassignments from names of other starch crops, rather than specifically being for Polynesian arrowroot. Usually, the names of Polynesian arrowroot are transferred from the names of the sago palms (Metroxylon sagu), giant swamp taros (Cyrtosperma merkusii), and fermented breadfruit (Artocarpus altilis).

Derivations from Proto-Malayo-Polynesian *sagu ("sago palm"), include Chamorro and Toba Batak sagu. Derivations from Proto-Polynesian *mā ("fermented breadfruit"), included Tongan māhoaʻa; Tokelauan mahoā; Anutan maoa; East Futunan māsoʻā; Samoan māsoā; and Tuvaluan māsoa. Derivations from Proto-Polynesian *bulaka (giant swamp taro) include Patpatar and Tolai pulaka. Derivations from Proto-Austronesian *biRaq (giant taro) include Äiwoo (to)piya. And finally, derivations from Proto-Oceanic Rabia (sago) include Bauan yabia; and Pileni, Rarotongan, Samoan, Niuean, Tahitian, Rapa Nui, and Hawaiian pia.

=== Talipariti tiliaceum (sea hibiscus) ===
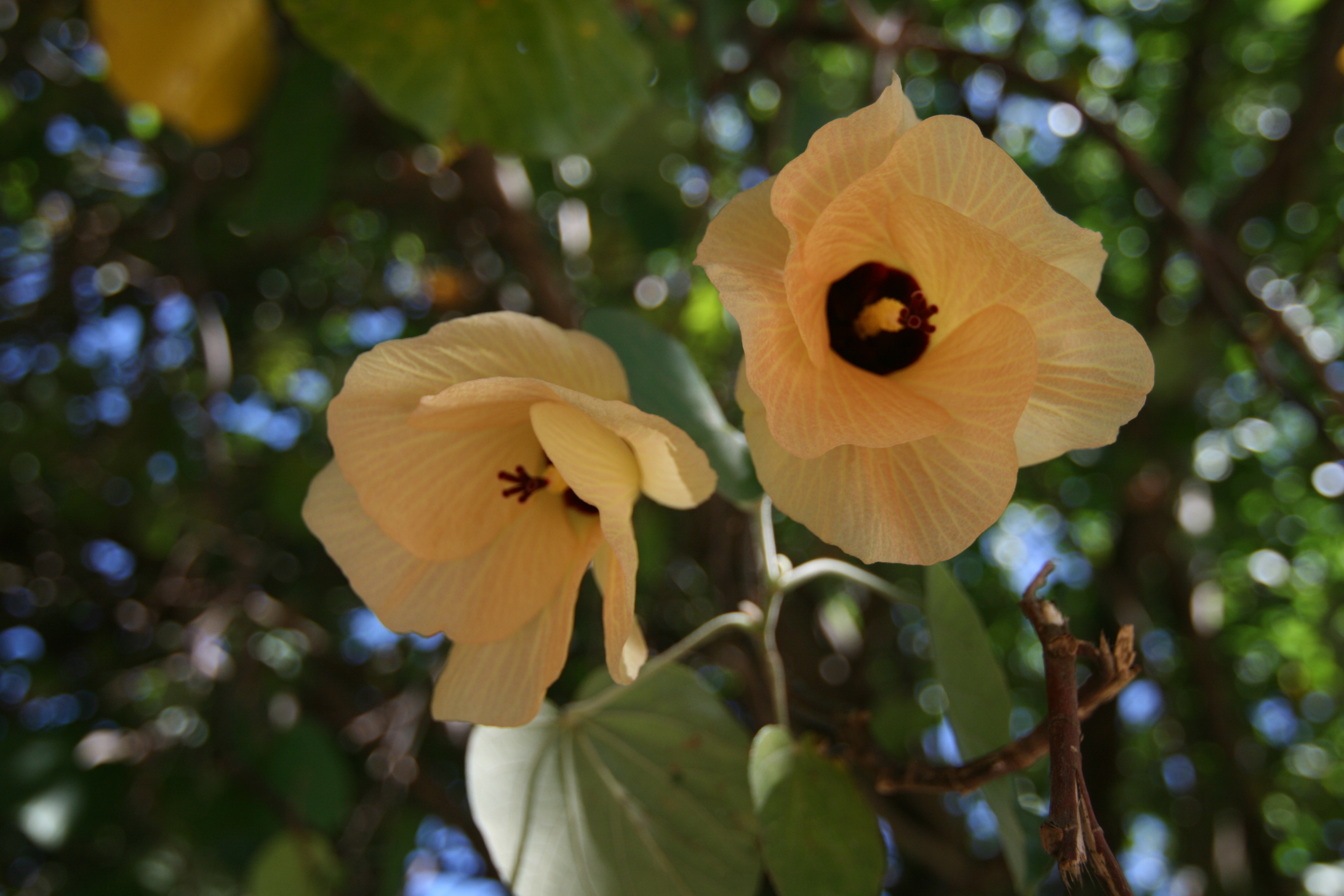
Sea hibiscus flowers in Puna'auia, Tahiti

Sea hibiscus (Talipariti tiliaceum) is a common tree in beaches in the tropical Indo-Pacific. It is widely used by Austronesian peoples for timber and fiber. It has several subspecies, two of which are endemic to the Philippines and Sulawesi, with the rest widespread throughout its range or native to large regions of Southeast Asia and the Pacific. The seeds remain viable for months after floating in the sea. However, no remains of beach hibiscus have been recovered from Polynesia prior to the Austronesian arrival, making it clear that they were introduced by Austronesian voyagers.

The wood is soft and not very durable, so it is mostly only used for products like carvings, spears, bowls, and bracelets. However, it is also resistant to saltwater and thus can be used to make small canoes and outriggers. The wood is also preferred for fire making by friction. The fiber extracted from the bark is widely used to make cordage and for caulking. The bark is also used in the production of tempeh in Southeast Asia, and kava drinks in Polynesia. The attractive flowers are commonly made into leis in Hawaii.

The terms for beach hibiscus can be reconstructed to Proto-Malayo-Polynesian *baRu, which became Proto-Oceanic *paRu and Proto-Micronesian *kili-fau. Modern cognates include Itbayaten vayu; Ilocano bagó; Kankana-ey bágo; Chamorro pagu; Tagalog balibago; Cebuano malabago or maribago; Maranao bago; Ngaju Dayak baro; Malagasy baro or varo; Malay baru; Javanese, Rembong, and Kambera waru; Sangir and Soboyo bahu; Makasar baru; Erai hau; Leti paru; Paulohi haru; Buruese fahu; Gitua paru; Mailu waru; Mota var or varu; Sye nau or vau; Anejom n-hau; Fijian vau; Tongan and Samoan fau; Rotuman, Rennellese, and Hawaiian hau; and Māori whau.

In addition, there are numerous terms relating to the use of sea hibiscus for cordage and fiber in various Austronesian languages which can be traced back to Proto-Malayo-Polynesian or Proto-Austronesian, like *Calis, "rope".

=== Thespesia populnea (Pacific rosewood) ===
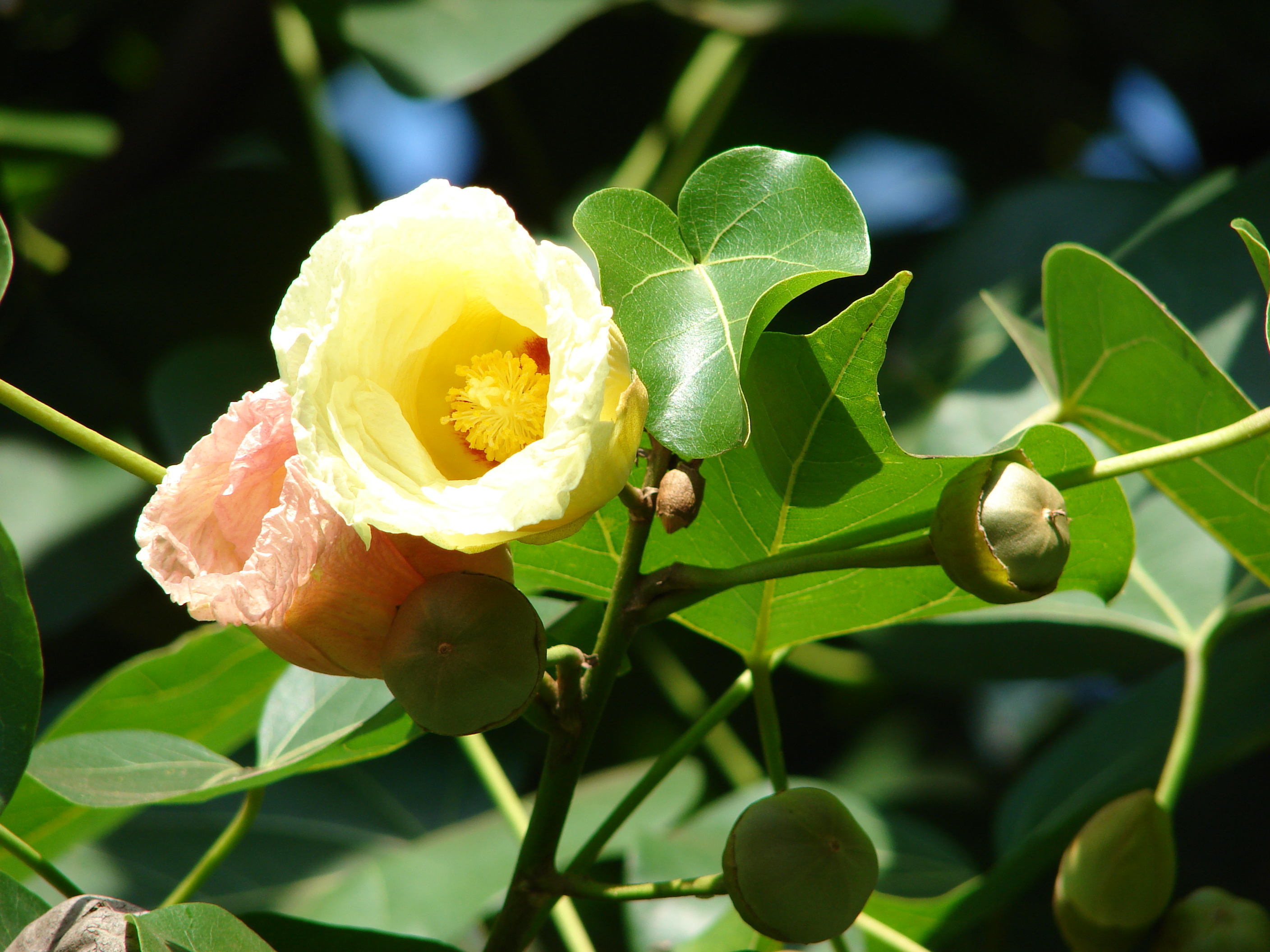
Pacific rosewood in Hawaii

The Pacific rosewood (Thespesia populnea) is closely related to beach hibiscus. They are similar in appearance and grow in the same habitats, thus they are commonly confused with each other. It is also used similarly among Austronesian cultures, being one of the main sources of bast fibers for the production of cordage and wood for Austronesian outrigger ships and carving. Pacific rosewood is native to the Old World tropics. Like beach hibiscus, the seeds remain viable for months after floating in the sea but no remains of T. populnea have been recovered from Polynesia prior to the Austronesian expansion. Thus it is regarded as deliberate introductions by Austronesian settlers.

The trees were regarded as sacred in Polynesian culture, and were commonly planted in marae sites along with trees like Ficus, Fagraea berteroana, Casuarina equisetifolia and Calophyllum inophyllum.

The terms for Pacific rosewood can be reconstructed to Proto-Malayo-Polynesian *balu, with cognates including Itbayaten valu; Malagasy válo; Simeulue falu; Ngela valu; Arosi haru; and Lonwolwol bal. Another term which extends to Oceanic is Proto-Malayo-Polynesian *banaRu with cognates including Hanunó'o banagu; Tolai banar; Patpatar banaro; Mota vanau; and Pohnpeian pana.

In Eastern Polynesia, most modern names can be reconstructed back to Proto-Eastern Oceanic *milo, with cognates including Tongan, Niue, Samoan, and Hawaiian milo; Rapa Nui, Tahitan, Tuamotuan, and Māori miro; and Marquesan miʻo. In some islands, the names have shifted to refer to trees that are used similarly, like Prumnopitys ferruginea in New Zealand and Sophora toromiro in Easter Island.

=== Zingiberaceae (ginger family) ===
Gingers (family Zingiberaceae) were cultivated extensively by Austronesians for food, medicine, weaving materials, and for religious purposes. The most commonly cultivated species include the lengkuas (Alpinia galanga), fingerroot (Boesenbergia rotunda), turmeric (Curcuma longa), torch ginger (Etlingera elatior), and ginger (Zingiber officinale). Other species were also exploited at a smaller scale or harvested from the wild, including dwarf cardamom (Alpinia nutans), panasa cardamom (Amomum acre), white turmeric (Curcuma zedoaria), jiddo (Hornstedtia scottiana), white ginger lily (Hedychium coronarium), and bitter ginger (Zingiber zerumbet).

==== Alpinia galanga (lengkuas) ====
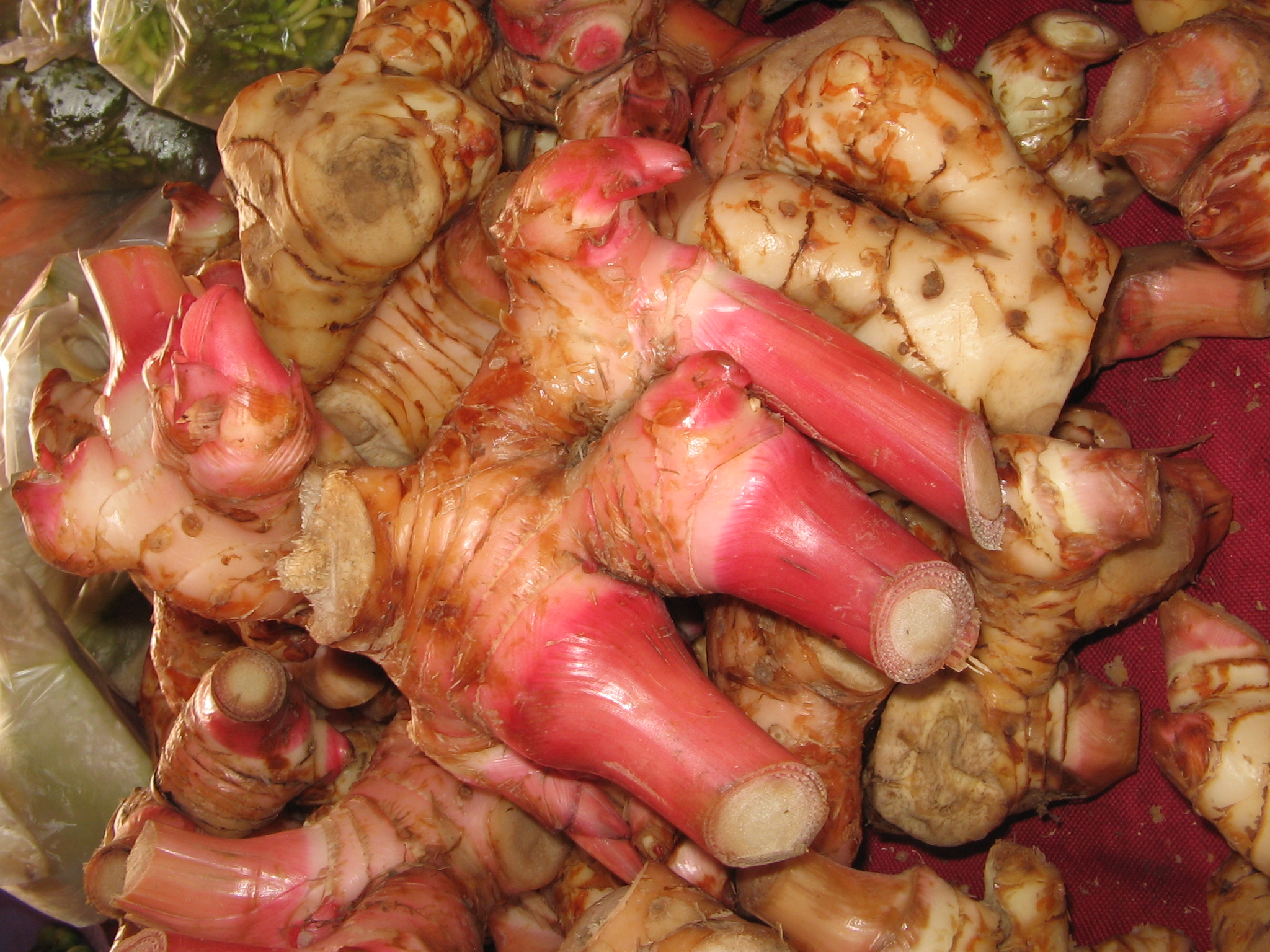
Lengkuas rhizomes from Malaysia

The lengkuas (Alpinia galanga) is native to Southeast Asia. Its original center of cultivation during the spice trade was Java, and today it is still cultivated extensively in Maritime Southeast Asia, most notably in the Greater Sunda Islands and the Philippines. It is valued for its use in food and for traditional medicine and is regarded as being superior to ginger. It has a pungent smell reminiscent of black pepper. The red and white cultivars are often used differently, with the red cultivars being primarily medicinal, and the white cultivars being primarily a spice. Lengkuas is also the source of the leaves used to make nanel among the Kavalan people of Taiwan, a rolled leaf instrument used as a traditional children's toy common among Austronesian cultures.

Lengkuas can be reconstructed to Proto-Western Malayo-Polynesian *laŋkuas, with cognates including Ilokano langkuás; Tagalog, Bikol, Kapampangan, Visayan, and Manobo langkáuas or langkáwas; Aklanon eangkawás; Kadazan Dusun hongkuas; Ida'an lengkuas; Ngaju Dayak langkuas; Iban engkuas; and Malay lengkuas (from which the English name is derived from). Some of the names have become generalized and are also applied to other species of Alpinia as well as for Curcuma zedoaria.

==== Curcuma longa (turmeric) ====
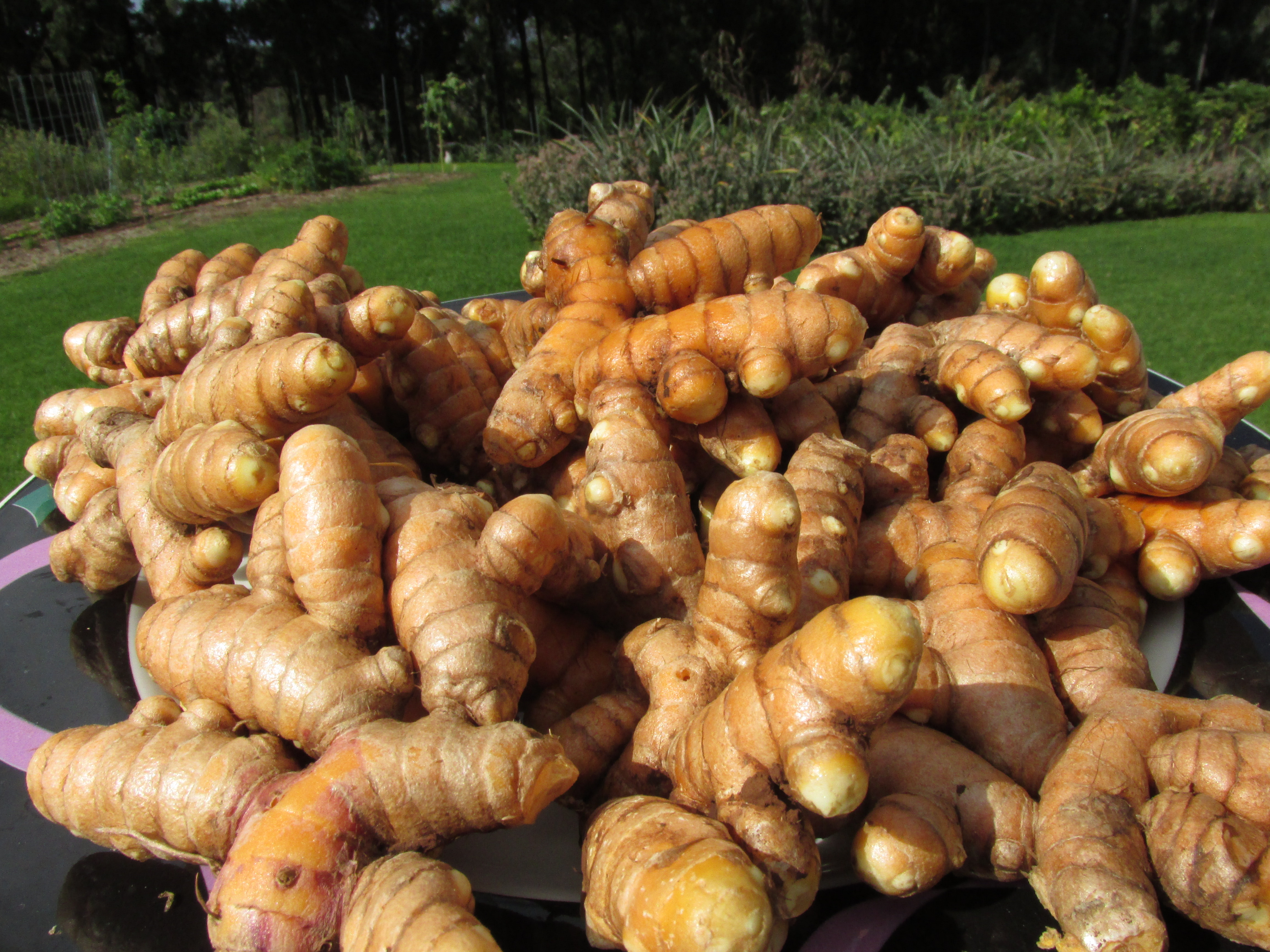
Turmeric ('ōlena) in Hawaii

There is strong evidence that turmeric (Curcuma longa) as well as the related white turmeric (Curcuma zedoaria) were independently domesticated by Austronesians. Turmeric has a very widespread distribution and names that pre-date contact with India, being found among all Austronesian regions with the exception of Taiwan. However, it was seemingly originally domesticated for the production of dyes, eventually contributing to the words for "yellow" and "red" in various Austronesian languages.

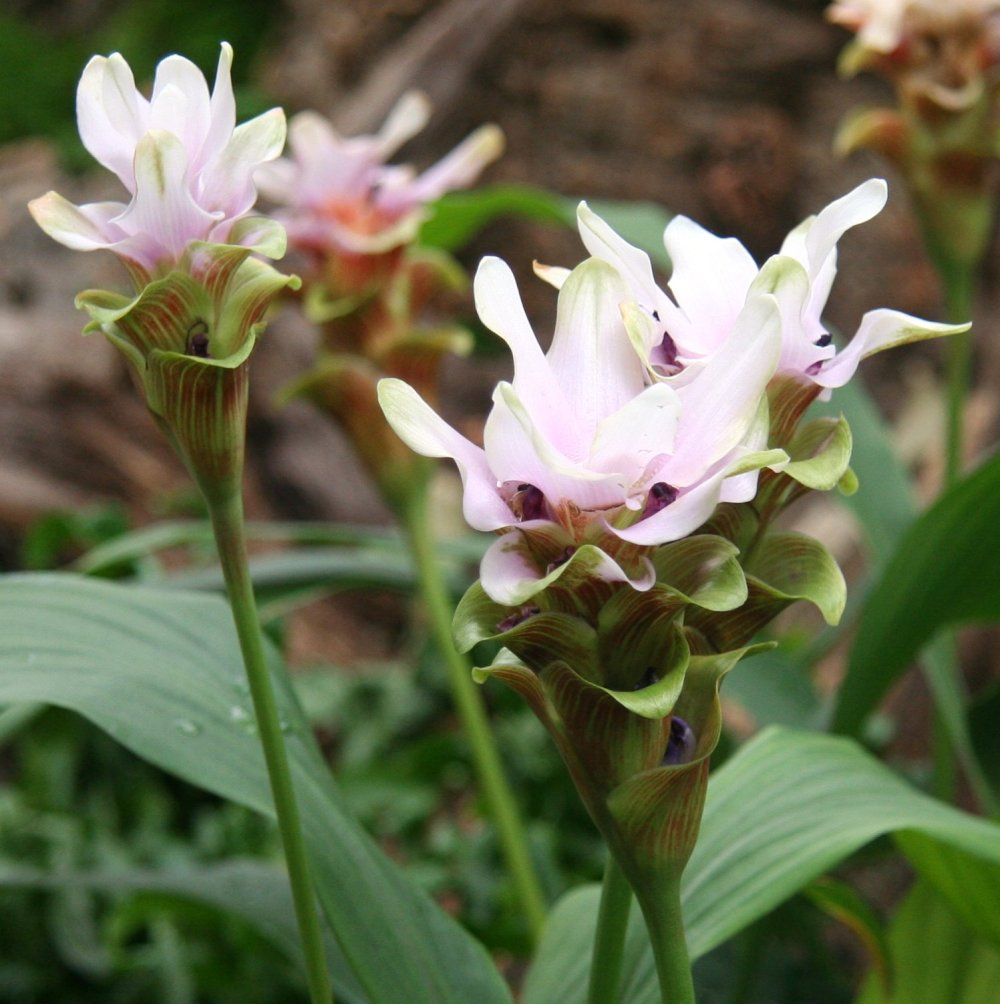
White turmeric (Curcuma zedoaria)

The plant is important in the Philippines and Indonesia as a traditional dye for clothing and food coloring. It was particularly valued for coloring food offerings to spirits as well as body painting in religious rituals or social ceremonies. It is also used as a spice, as medicine and as food. Similar uses are also found in the other islands settled by Austronesians, including Madagascar and the Comoros in East Africa. In Micronesia, it was a valuable trade item acquired from Yap. In Polynesia and Melanesia, they are primarily used as body paint in rituals or as a cosmetic. The latter regions have been isolated for centuries from the rest of Maritime Southeast Asia prior to European contact.

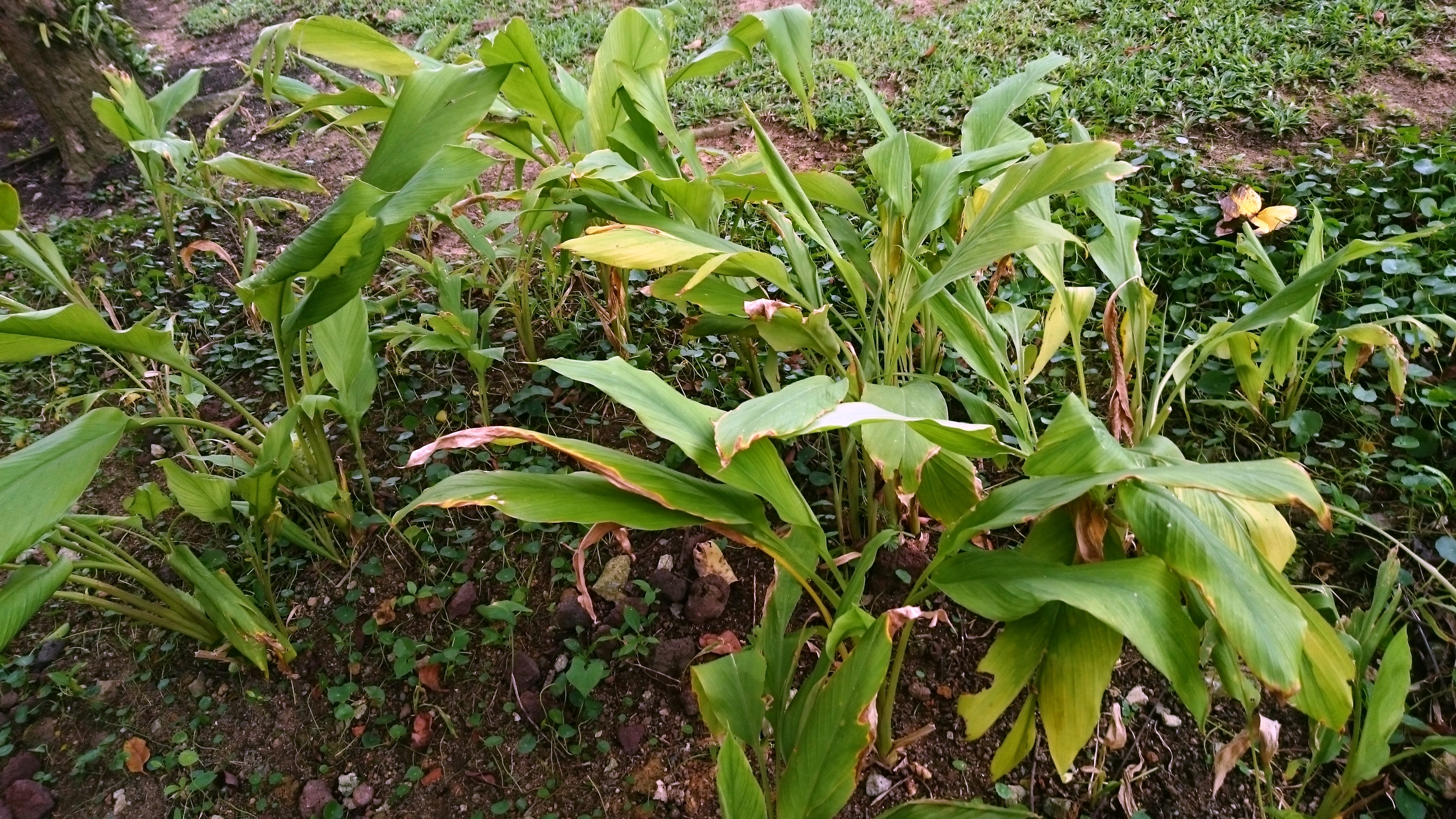
Turmeric (kunyit) in Singapore

There are two main cognate sets for C. longa and C. zedoaria (both of which produce yellow dye) in Austronesian languages. The first is reconstructed as Proto-Malayo-Polynesian *kunij which originally referred to turmeric. Its cognates include Ilocano, Kankana-ey, and Isneg kúnig; Bontoc kúnəg; Ifugao ūnig; Casiguran Dumagat kuneg; Iban and Malay kunyit; Toba Batak hunik; Javanese kunir; Sangir and Tae' kuniʻ; Uma kuni; Rembong kunis; Ngadha wuné; and Manggarai wunis. In Malagasy and Betsimisaraka, the cognates hónitra and húnitra have shifted meaning to a different plant used to make red dye. Other cognates like Ilocano kimmúnig; Uma mo-kuni, and Tae' pakuniran all mean "yellow" or "to dye something yellow".

The other cognate set is derived from reconstructed Proto-Western-Malayo-Polynesian *temu, and originally meant C. zedoaria which was used primarily as a spice. It also sometimes shifted to ginger and other ginger-like plants used for cooking (rather than dye production). Its cognates include Kapampangan and Balinese tamu; Tagalog támo; Visayan tamangyan; Bukidnon tamohilang; Bikol tamahilan or tamaylan; Malay, Javanese, and Sasak temu; Makasarese tammu; and Malagasy tamutamu. In other Austronesian languages in East Africa, however, the other cognates mean "yellow", including Comorian Shibushi and Antemoro tamutamu; and Antambahoaka and Antankarana manamutamu.

In Proto-Oceanic, there are two main cognate sets derived from reconstructed *aŋo and *deŋ(w)a, both are unrelated to the Proto-Malayo-Polynesian etymons. The latter probably originally applied to the dye produced from turmeric, while the former referred originally to the plant itself. Cognates include Fijian cango; and Tongan and Rennellese ango (spelled "ago" in Samoan. Cognates that mean "yellow" also exist in numerous other languages in Near Oceania.

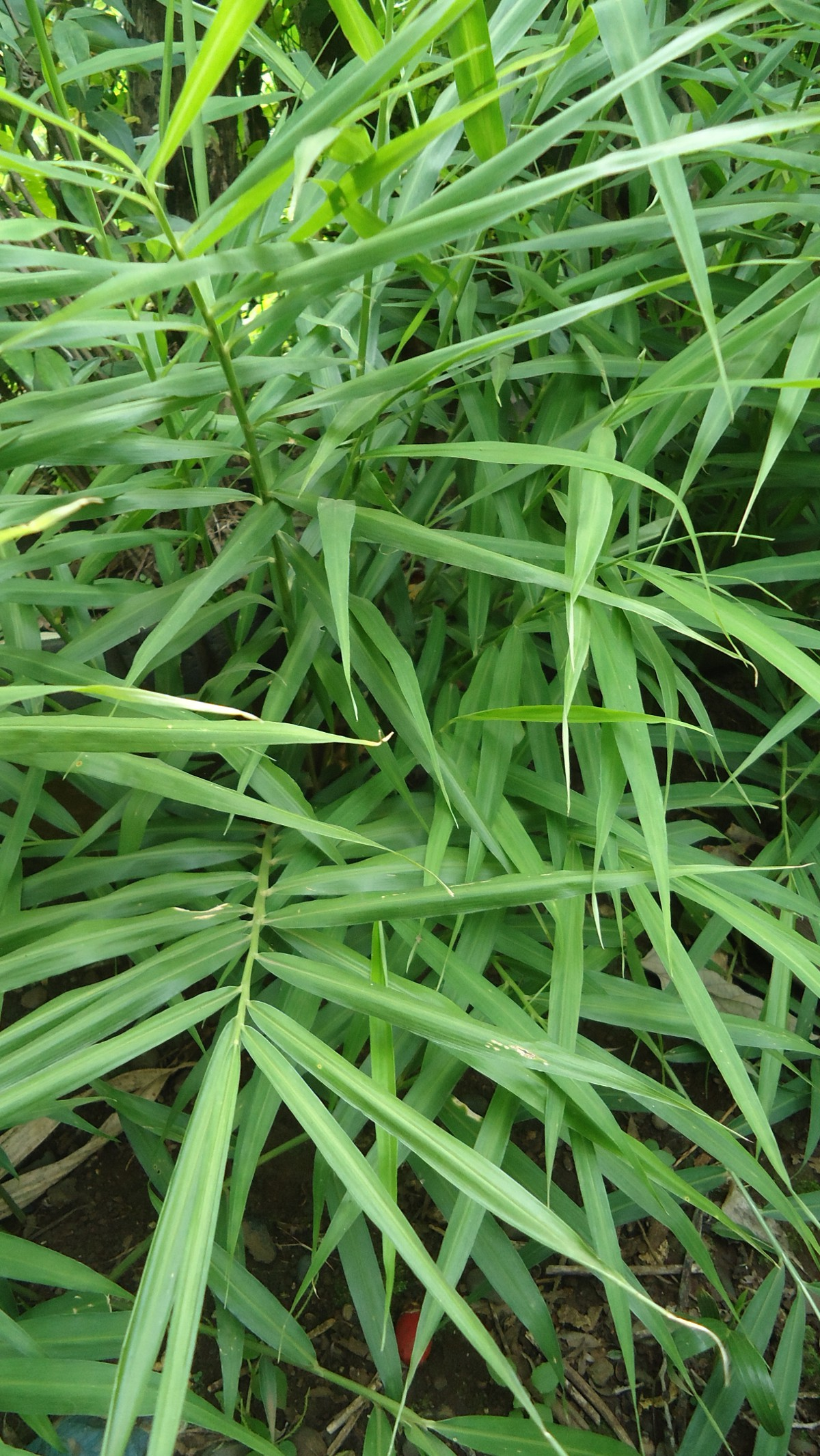
Ginger plants in Mindanao

==== Zingiber officinale (ginger) ====
Ginger (Zingiber officinale) is native to Maritime Southeast Asia and was probably originally domesticated by Austronesians. It is an ancient and ubiquitous crop among Austronesians, reaching all the way to Remote Oceania and Madagascar. Aside from being used for cuisine, ginger appears to have significant religious and medicinal roles in early Austronesian cultures, based on the glosses it acquired. Ginger were chewed by shamans and spat out intermittently in rituals for healing, warding, and blessing ships.

In Proto-Austronesian, the terms for ginger can be reconstructed to *dukduk. With cognates including Pazeh dukuduk; Thao suksuk; Tsou cucʻu; and Saaroa suusuku. This was replaced by *laqia in languages south of Taiwan.

The terms for ginger beyond Taiwan can be reconstructed to Proto-Malayo-Polynesian *laqia, which became Proto-Oceanic *laqia and Proto-Central Polynesian *laya. Cognates include Ilocano, Agta, Isneg, Itawis, Kankana-ey, and Casiguran Dumagat layá; Bontoc, Ifugao and Kapampangan láya; Batad Ifugao lāya; Tagalog luya; Bikol láʻya; Visayan luyʻa; Tboli leʻiye; Kadazan Dusun hazo; Tombonuwo and Abai Sembuak layo; Ida'an Begak lejo; Basap, Long Anap Kenyah, Sangir, and Tontemboan lia; Lun Dayeh and Kelabit lieh; Berawan and Miriʼ lejeh; Narum lejieh; Kenyah (Òma Lóngh) lezó; Murik and Iban liaʻ; Kelai and Wahau Kenyah jeʻ; Segai aljoʻ; Modang lejao̯ʻ; Kiput lecih; Bintulu leza; Iban liaʻ; Dayak roiʻi; Jarai reya; Malay halia; Tialo loía; Balaesang láia; Bare'e leʻia; Tae laia or laya; Makasarese laia; Muna longhia; Bimanese rea; Manggarai, Roti, Erai, Leti, Wetan. and Lamaholot lia; and Sika and Ngadha lea; Kowiai and Kei leii. In Oceanic languages, cognates include Lou and Kairiru lei; Penchal lai; Ahus and Kurti liy; Drehet lip; Lindrow ley; Mussau and Wuvulu, Neham laia; Tanga lae; Lakalai la lahia; Gitua laea; Wedau naia; 'Āre'āre and Arosi ria; Sa'a lie; and Fijian cango laya.

==== Zingiber zerumbet (bitter ginger) ====
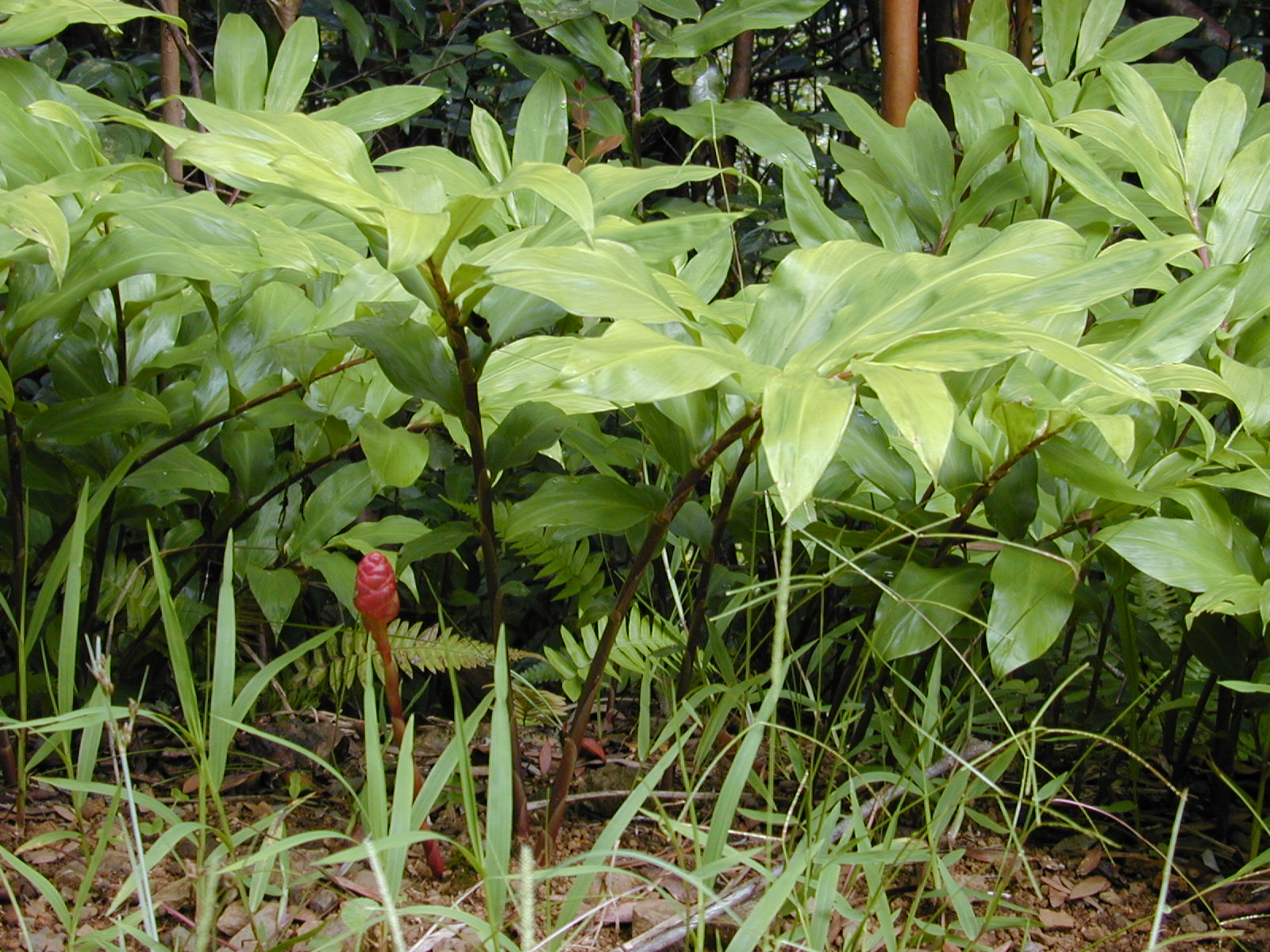
Bitter ginger in Maui

Bitter ginger (Zingiber zerumbet) is native to tropical Asia and Australasia. Like the ginger, was carried by Austronesian settlers all the way to Remote Oceania during prehistoric times. Thus it is likely that it was originally domesticated by Austronesians. Remains of bitter ginger have also been identified from the Kuk Swamp archaeological site in New Guinea at the Phase 1 layers dated to 10,220 to 9,910 BP. However, whether they were cultivated or simply exploited from the wild is unknown.

Bitter ginger is primarily used for traditional medicine. It also has mildly psychoactive properties when consumed, and thus had ritual importance among early Austronesian cultures. According to Lynch (2002), terms for bitter ginger in the sense of "bitter root" or "potent root [used as fish poison]", reconstructed as Proto-Oceanic *kawaRi, is believed to have been transferred to the kava (Piper methysticum), which has similar properties and is also bitter-tasting, when Austronesians of the Lapita culture first encountered it among the indigenous non-Austronesian peoples in Melanesia.

Some reflexes of it still refer to bitter ginger, including Sissano (una)kaw; Gapapaiwa kaware; Tikopia, Anutan, and Wallisian kava-pui; Samoan ʻava-pui; Tahitian ava-puhi; and Hawaiian ʻawa-puhi. Other reflexes also refer to other members of the genus Piper, to fish poison, or as words to describe bitter, sour, or acrid flavors.

In non-Oceanic languages, terms for bitter ginger can be reconstructed to Proto-Western Malayo-Polynesian *lampuyaŋ, with cognates including Cebuano and Ngaju Dayak lampuyang; Javanese lempuyang; and Malay lempoyang.

== Animals ==
Domesticated, semi-domesticated, and commensal animals carried by Austronesian voyagers include the following:

=== Bubalus bubalis (water buffalo) ===
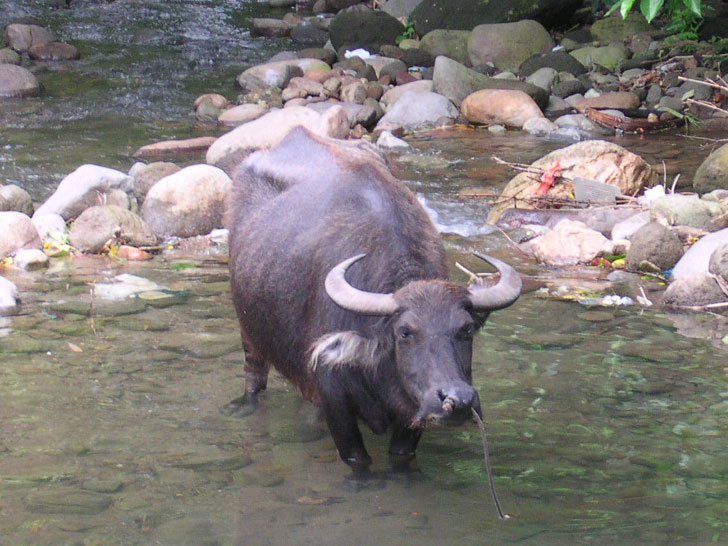
The carabao, a swamp-type water buffalo from the Philippines

Water buffaloes are essential work animals in Austronesian paddy field agriculture and were carried along with rice to Maritime Southeast Asia from mainland Asia. Early introductions were specifically of the swamp-type water buffaloes (like the carabao), although they are increasingly being replaced by river-type water buffaloes imported from South Asia in recent times.

The earliest remains of water buffaloes in Maritime Southeast Asia with signs of domestication comes from multiple fragmentary skeletal remains recovered from the upper layers of the Neolithic Nagsabaran site, part of the Lal-lo and Gattaran Shell Middens (~2200 BCE to 400 CE) of northern Luzon. Most of the remains consisted of skull fragments, almost all of which have cut marks indicating they were butchered. The remains are associated with red slipped pottery, spindle whorls, stone adzes, and jade bracelets; which have strong affinities to similar artifacts from Neolithic Austronesian archeological sites in Taiwan. Based on the radiocarbon date of the layer in which the oldest fragments were found, water buffaloes were first introduced to the Philippines by at least 500 BCE.

The English term "carabao" is borrowed from the Spanish word carabao, which is derived from Eastern Visayan (likely Waray) karabàw. Cognates include Cebuano kábaw, Tagalog kalabáw, Kavalan qabaw, Minangkabau kabau, Malay/Indonesian kerbau, and Javanese kebo. These Austronesian terms appear to be loanwords from the Austroasiatic languages and likely derives from a secondary pre-colonial introduction of water buffaloes into Maritime Southeast Asia via western Indonesia.

However, it is also clear that Austronesians already had ancient terms for the carabao, reconstructed as Proto-Austronesian *qaNuaŋ. Cognates include Papora loan, Thao qnuwan, Siraya luang, Rukai nwange, Ilocano nuang, Tagalog anwang or anowang, Kankanaey nuang, Isneg nuang, Itawis nwang, Bontoc nuwang, Ifugao nuwang, and Aklanon anwang. Cognates survive into Sulawesi, but the terms there apply to the related anoa. Similarly, Hanunó'o anwang also refers to the tamaraw of Mindoro, rather than the carabao. These terms spread southwards from Taiwan, indicating that domesticated carabaos were carried partially into the Philippines during the Austronesian expansion, but didn't move further south into the rest of Maritime Southeast Asia until the second introduction from Mainland Southeast Asia. The reason for this is unknown.

Other native names for carabaos include damulag in Tagalog, Bikol, and Kapampangan; dueg in Pangasinan; and pagad in Ivatan.

=== Bos javanicus domesticus (Bali cattle) ===
Bali cattle were domesticated in Bali from the wild banteng around 3500 BCE.

=== Canis lupus familiaris (dog) ===
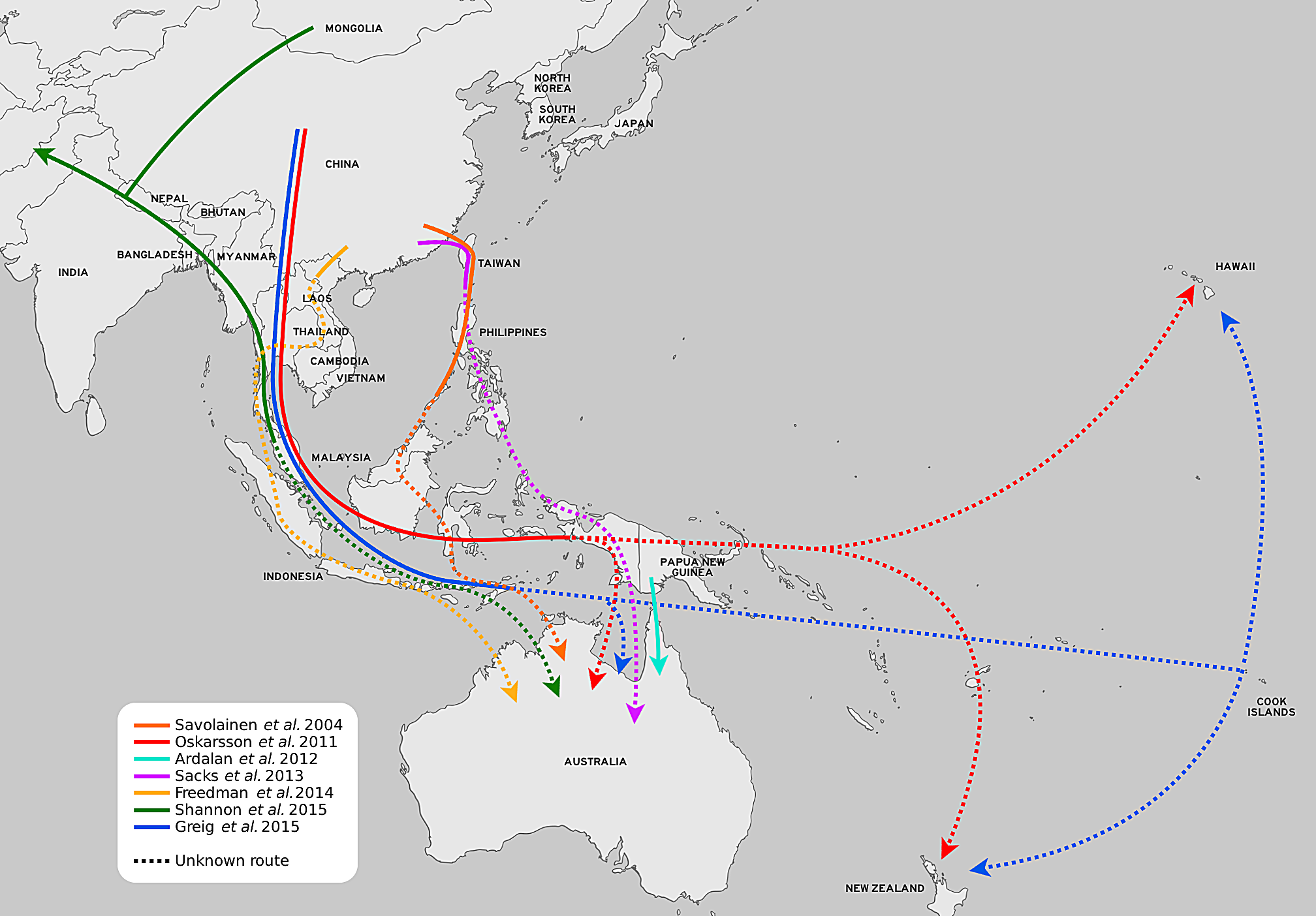
Map depicting possible phylogeographic origins of dingoes, New Guinea singing dogs, and Maritime Southeast Asian and Oceanian dogs, based on recent genetic evidence (Fillios & Taçon, 2016)

Dogs were primarily valued for their social functions in various Austronesian cultures, acting as companions and pets. They were also trained to be hunting or guard dogs. Ornaments made from dog fur, teeth, and bones are found in archaeological sites throughout Austronesia. These could be traded as commodities, along with dog pups. Dogs were also sometimes eaten, but this varies by culture, with most groups refusing to eat dogs, while in others they were apparently a main food source.

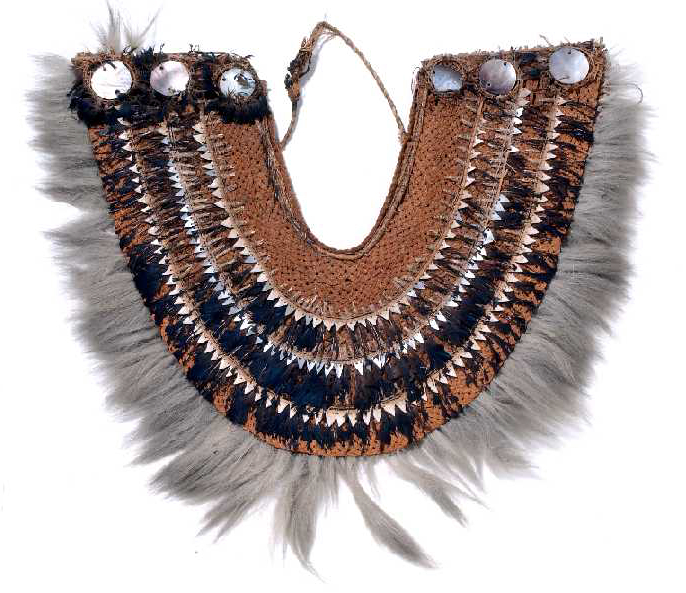
A taumi, a traditional breast ornament fringed with dog hair from the Tuamotus, James Cook Collection: Australian Museum

In 2020, an mDNA study of ancient dog fossils from the Yellow River and Yangtze River basins of southern China showed that most of the ancient dogs fell within haplogroup A1b, as do the Australian dingoes and the pre-colonial dogs of the Pacific, but in low frequency in China today. The specimen from the Tianluoshan archaeological site (Hemudu culture, pre-Austronesians), Zhejiang province dates to 7,000 YBP and is basal to the entire lineage. The dogs belonging to this haplogroup were once widely distributed in southern China, then dispersed through Southeast Asia into New Guinea and Oceania, but were replaced in China 2,000 YBP by dogs of other lineages.

The origins of the dog (Canis lupus familiaris) population in Maritime Southeast Asia, Australia, and New Guinea are contentious, with various authors proposing origins from either Mainland Southeast Asia, Taiwan, or both at different times. These introduction events have been linked to the origin of the Australian dingoes and the New Guinea singing dogs, both of which are clearly descended from domesticated dogs. The specifics of which population they are derived from, who introduced them, and whether they come from a common ancestor, however, still do not have a consensus.

Regardless, most authors agree that there were at least two introduction events. One arriving with Paleolithic maritime hunter-gatherers by at least 10,000 to 5,000 BP, and another arriving with later Neolithic seafaring migrations of farming and trading Austronesian peoples (via Taiwan) by at least by at least 5,000 BP. The Neolithic dogs are differentiated from previous populations in having the ability to digest starch, indicating that they accompanied humans who cultivated cereal crops. The Neolithic introductions are believed to have partially replaced the original introductions and became the ancestors of the modern village dogs of Southeast Asia. Austronesian dogs like the Taiwan dog were deeply valued as hunting companions (particularly for wild boar). In the Philippines, dog remains have been found buried near or beside human graves in archaeological sites.

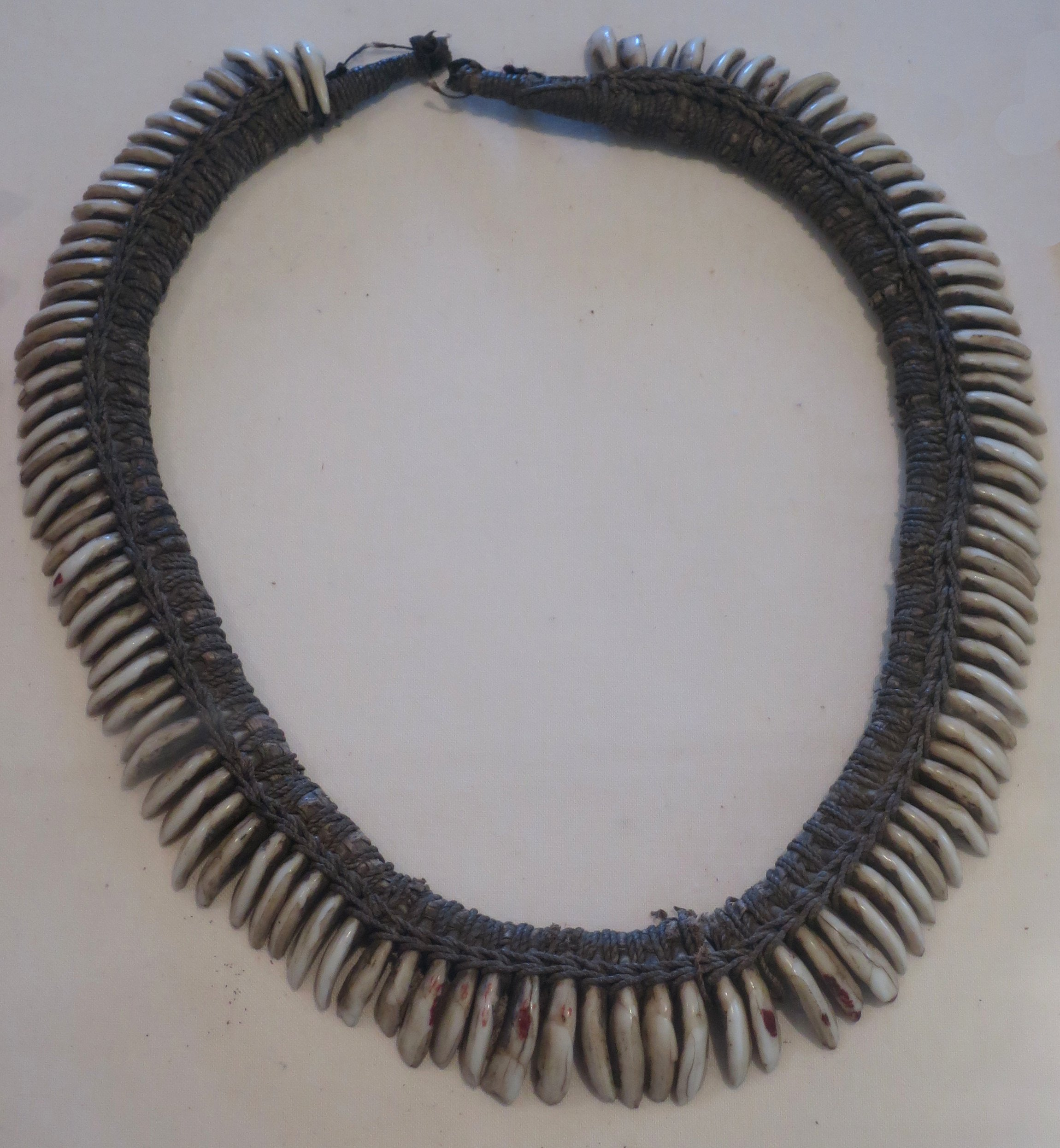
Lei niho ʻīlio from Hawaii using dog teeth

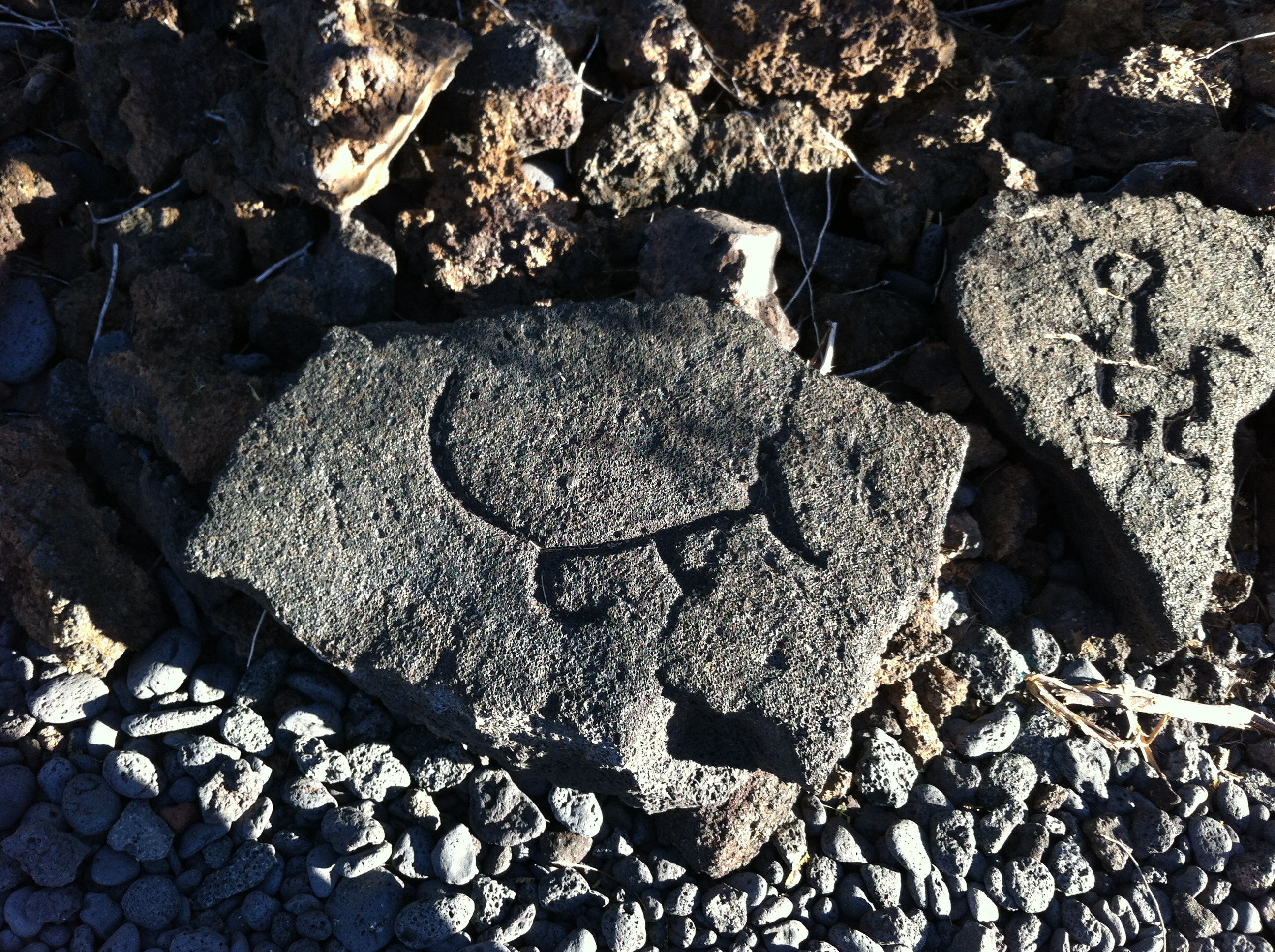
Ancient Hawaiian petroglyphic depiction of an ʻīlio (Hawaiian Poi Dog)

The oldest archaeological remains of dogs in Maritime Southeast Asia and Oceania is a dog burial in Timor and dingo remains in Australia, both of which are dated to around 3,500 BP. The former are believed to have been part of the second wave and the latter from the first wave.

From Maritime Southeast Asia, they were carried by Austronesian voyagers into Near Oceania. However, unlike in Maritime Southeast Asia, dogs lost their economic importance as hunting animals among Austronesians that reached the smaller islands in Melanesia and Polynesia, which had no populations of wild boar or other large mammals that could be hunted. They became a competitor for limited food resources and thus were themselves eaten. The Austronesian domesticated dogs originally carried by the Lapita Culture migrations were eaten to extinction in many islands since ancient times.

Thus Austronesian dogs were "lost" during the early colonization of Near Oceania. This caused a marked discontinuity in the genes of domesticated dogs, as well as the terms for "dog", among Austronesians in the Pacific Islands and Island Melanesia, in comparison to other Austronesian regions in Maritime Southeast Asia.

However, dogs were later reintroduced from neighboring Papuan groups and were subsequently carried eastward into Polynesia by post-Lapita Austronesian migrations, reaching as far as Hawaii and New Zealand. Though these dogs were treated as food animals, rather than hunting companions. Genetic studies have confirmed this, showing that Polynesian dogs are descended from the first wave of dog introductions and are not related to the dogs originating from Taiwan and the Philippines. Dogs were historically eaten in Tahiti and other islands of Polynesia, including Hawaii at the time of first European contact. James Cook, when first visiting Tahiti in 1769, recorded in his journal, "few were there of us but what allow'd that a South Sea Dog was next to an English Lamb, one thing in their favour is that they live entirely upon Vegetables". Calvin Schwabe reported in 1979 that dog was widely eaten in Hawaii and considered to be of higher quality than pork or chicken. When Hawaiians first encountered early British and American explorers, they were at a loss to explain the visitors' attitudes about dog meat. The Hawaiians raised both dogs and pigs as pets and for food. They could not understand why their British and American visitors only found the pig suitable for consumption. This practice seems to have died out, along with the native Hawaiian breed of dog, the unique Hawaiian Poi Dog, which was primarily used for this purpose.

On certain Pacific islands, dogs died out after original settlement or were never brought by the settlers in the first place, notably: the Mariana Islands, Palau, Marshall Islands, Gilbert Islands, New Caledonia, Vanuatu, Tonga, Marquesas, Mangaia in the Cook Islands, Rapa Iti in French Polynesia, Easter Island, Chatham Islands, and Pitcairn Island (settled by the Bounty mutineers, who killed off their dogs in order to escape discovery by passing ships).

Dogs were not introduced to Madagascar by Austronesians. A genetic study by Ardalan et al. (2015) revealed that the dog population in Madagascar were all derived solely from African dog populations and did not come from Southeast Asian dog populations. This aberrant origin is also reflected in the Malagasy languages, where the terms for "dog" originate entirely from African Bantu languages. Given the inferred importance of dogs to Austronesian voyagers, the authors proposed that the Austronesian settlers in Madagascar may have initially brought dogs, but they either died or were used as food sources during the journey. Another possibility is that the limited initial number of Austronesian dogs may have simply resulted in their genes getting swamped by the influx of a far larger population of dogs from Africa.

=== Gallus gallus (chicken) ===
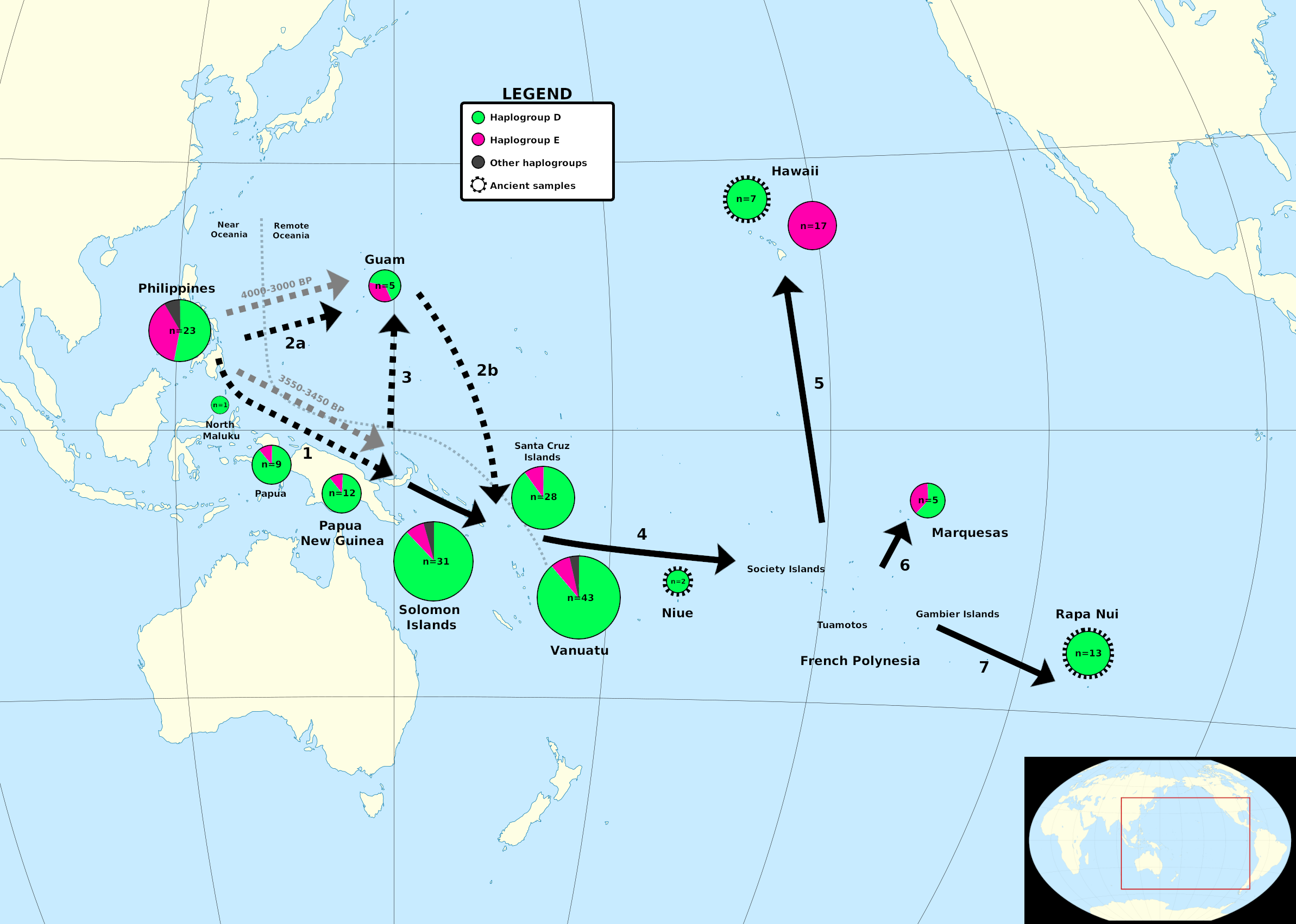
Map showing the prehistoric introduction of domesticated chickens into Oceania from the Philippines via the Neolithic Austronesian expansion (c. 4000 BP), inferred from genetic markers on ancient and modern chicken DNA

Junglefowl were one of the three main animals (along with domesticated pigs and dogs) carried by early Austronesian peoples from Maritime Southeast Asia in their voyages to the islands of Oceania.

=== Sus scrofa domesticus (pig) ===
Pigs were one of the three main animals (along with domesticated chickens and dogs) carried by early Austronesian peoples from Maritime Southeast Asia in their voyages to the islands of Oceania.

A 2026 genomic and morphometric study identified that most free-living and domesticated pigs in the broad geographic region from the Philippines to Hawaiʻi have ancestry linked to domesticated pigs (Sus scrofa) that were first introduced by Austronesians from southeastern China and Taiwan via the Philippines around 4000 years ago.

Other species of pigs (Sus celebensis, Sus barbatus, Sus cebifrons, and Sus verrucosus), also spread much earlier from Mainland Southeast Asia to Maritime Southeast Asia west of the Wallace Line, via natural means or via earlier (non-Austronesian) hunter-gatherer groups. Many of these endemic pigs later interbred and hybridized with the Sus scrofa carried by Austronesians who settled these islands. But pigs in Near and Remote Oceania don't exhibit admixture, indicating that the first wave of Austronesian migrations via the Philippines that carried pigs likely did not mix with local preexisting human groups in Maritime Southeast Asia until much later.

=== Rodentia (rodents) ===
The following rodent species are common in mainland Southeast Asia, but are restricted to areas of wet rice cultivation in western Indonesia (Sumatra and Java).

==== Bandicota bengalensis ====
The following two rodents are native to South Asia and also present in western Indonesian rice fields, so their presence in Maritime Southeast Asia cannot easily be explained by Austronesian expansions, but perhaps instead by the Indian Ocean trade.

==== Mus terricolor (also known as Mus dunni) ====
Indigenous to northwestern India

==== Polynesian rat (Rattus exulans) ====
This rat originated on the island of Flores in Indonesia. Polynesians accidentally or deliberately introduced it to the islands they settled. This rat has been implicated in many of the extinctions of native birds and insects in the Pacific; these species had evolved in the absence of mammals and could not cope with predation by the rat.

== See also ==
- Agriculture in Papua New Guinea
- Catamaran – Watercraft with two parallel hulls of equal size
- Crab claw sail – Triangular sail with spars along upper and lower edges used by traditional Austronesians
- Domesticated plants of Mesoamerica
- Genomics of domestication – Selective breeding of plants and animals to serve humans
- History of agriculture
- List of food origins
- Outrigger canoe – Boat with one or more lateral support floats
- Proto-Oceanic language § Lexicon
- Tanja sail – Oblique quadrilateral sail from south east Asia
