= Proto–Admiralty Islands language =

Reconstructed ancestor of the Admiralty Islands languages

Proto–Admiralty Islands
- Proto-Admiralty, Proto-Admiralties, PAdm
- Reconstruction of: Admiralty Islands languages
- Region: Admiralty Islands
- Reconstructed ancestors: Proto-Austronesian: Proto-Malayo-Polynesian; Proto-Oceanic
- Lower-order reconstructions: Proto–Eastern Admiralty; Proto–Western Admiralty; Yapese (possibly)

Proto–Admiralty Islands (also known as Proto-Admiralty or Proto-Admiralties and abbreviated as PAdm) is the reconstructed ancestor of the Admiralty Islands languages of the Admiralty Islands, located in Papua New Guinea. It belongs to the Oceanic branch of the Austronesian languages.

It was reconstructed by Robert Blust in 1978 who showed that the languages form a subgroup within Oceanic. It was mentioned in detail by Malcolm Ross in 1998, who theorized a link with the two St. Matthias languages (Mussau and Tenis).

== Descendants ==
Proto–Admiralty Islands separated into two languages: Proto–Eastern Admiralty and Proto–Western Admiralty. Today, around thirty languages make up the Admiralty Islands subgroup of Oceanic. It has been theorized that Yapese is a descendant or a sister language to Proto–Admiralty Islands.

== Phonology ==
=== Consonants ===
The consonants of Proto–Admiralty Islands, according to Ross, are (parenthesis indicates an allophone):

Consonants
		Labiovelar	Bilabial	Alveolar	Palatal	Velar	Uvular
Nasal		*mʷ	*m	*n	*ɲ	*ŋ	
Stop	voiceless		*p	*t		*k	*q
Stop	voiced		*b	*d, *dr		*g	
Fricative		(*f)		*s	*c, *ɟ		*ʀ
Approximant		*w		*l, *r	*j		

- /*c/, like Proto-Oceanic, only occurs in word-medial position.
- [*f] is an allophone of /*p/ in word-medial position.
- /*ʀ/ was probably either [x] or [ɣ]. In the Eastern Admiralty languages, the reflex is usually [j], or sometimes [w] before /o/, while in the Western Admiralty languages, it disappears entirely.
- The voiced stops were probably prenasalized.

=== Vowels ===
Due to lack of vowel changes, Proto–Admiralty Islands had the same vowel system as Proto-Oceanic, *i, *e, *a, *o, *u, with no length contrast.

== Innovations ==
Ross (1988) describes the innovations separating Proto–Admiralty Islands from Proto-Oceanic.

Phonologically, they are:

- Proto-Oceanic *R was lost before high vowels. For example, POc *Rumaq "house" became PAdm *um(a), but POc *Rapi "evening" > PAdm *(pa)Rafi.
- Proto-Oceanic *p became *f word-medially. For example, POc *Ropok "to fly" became PAdm *Rof(o).
- Loss of all Proto-Oceanic word-final consonants, an innovation commonly found throughout Oceanic. For example, POc *boRok "pig" became PAdm *bou.

Morphosyntactically, they are:

- Numeral classifiers are used in the sequence numeral + classifier (shared with Mussau), which forms a single word.
- "One" is used as a common article, both as an indefinite and definite article (also shared with Mussau).
- Proto-Oceanic non-singular possessive pronominal suffixes are lost and replaced by disjunctive pronouns.
- *-ña "third person singular possessive suffix" irregularly becomes *-na (Proto–Admiralty Islands did not merge *n and *ñ, such as POc *poñu "turtle" > PAdm *poñ(u)).
- *kita "first person inclusive plural disjunctive" irregularly becomes *ta (for expected *ita with loss of the first vowel).
- Verb reduplication, which is used to form the continuative aspect, is lost. Daughter languages usually form the continuative aspect by adding the auxiliary verb meaning "to stay".
- Coalescence of the article *na with common nouns, resulting in changes to the initial consonant.
