= Languages of Fiji =

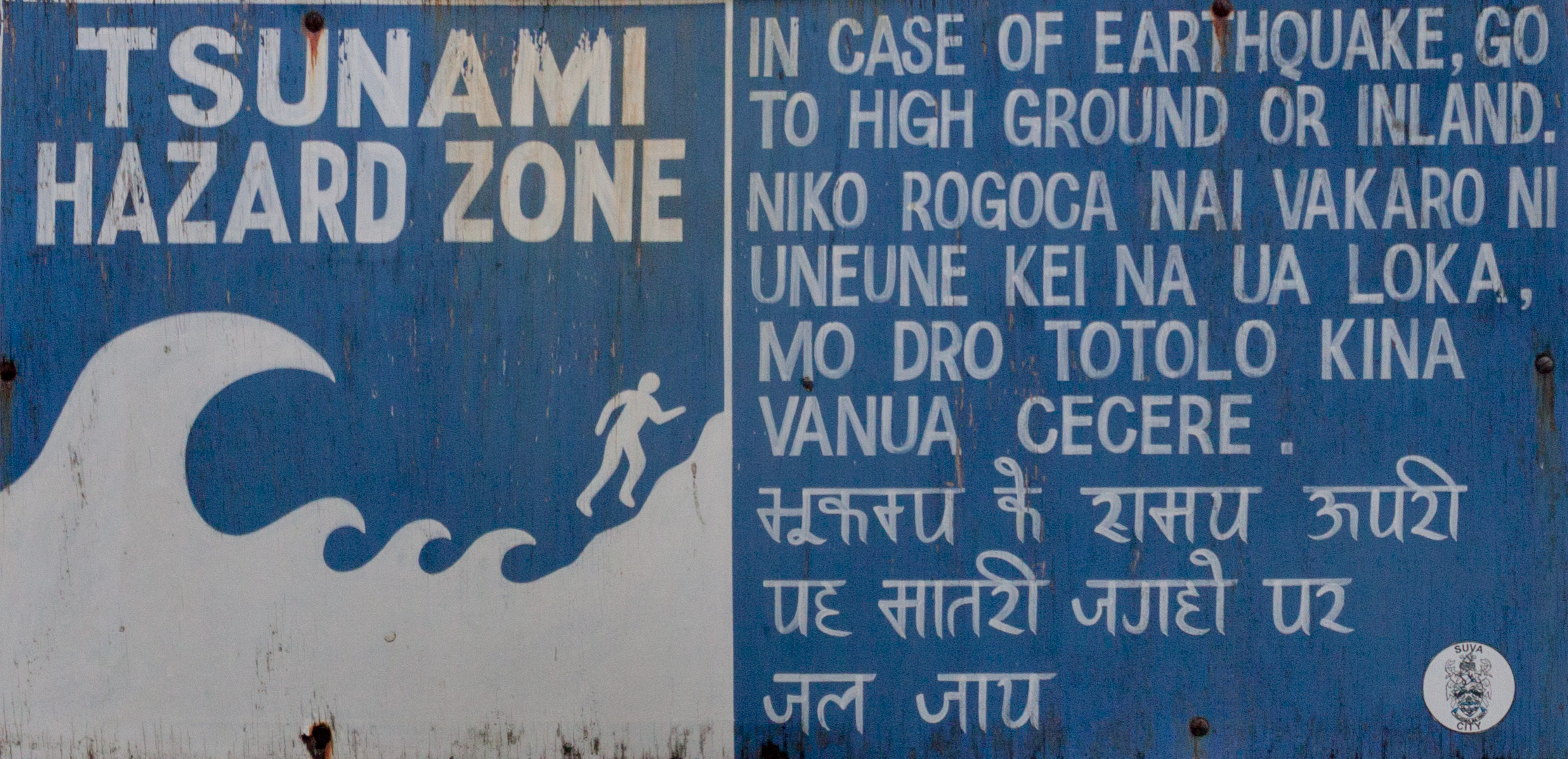
- Tsunami warning sign in Suva in English, Fijian and Hindi
- National: English, Fijian, Standard Hindi, Fiji Hindi
- Indigenous: Fijian, Rotuman
- Immigrant: Chinese, Fiji Hindi (mixture of Awadhi, Bhojpuri, Hindustani)
- Foreign: Chinese, French, Russian

Fiji has four primary national languages: English, Fijian (iTaukei), Standard Hindi (Hindustani), and Fiji Hindi. While the 1997 constitution declared English, Fijian and Hindustani as official languages of the state, the 2013 constitution does not explicitly establish one. However, it mandates translation in Hindi and iTaukei with the English version prevailing should there be difference in meaning. The primary language of the Fijian Government is English, however advisories and laws are required to be translated in iTaukei and Hindi as well. iTaukei is spoken as the first language by most indigenous Fijians, who make up around 54% of the population.

Indo-Fijians make up 37% of the population and speak Fiji-Hindi. English was the sole official language until 1997 and is widely used in government, business, and education as a lingua franca. Considerable business is also done in Fijian, especially away from larger town centres.

A small number of other Indigenous West Fijian and East Fijian regional languages are spoken on the islands, standard Fijian belonging to the East Fijian group. Arabic and Urdu are spoken by Muslims. Chinese and Rotuman are also spoken by immigrant populations.

== History ==
Until the 19th century, Fiji's population consisted almost entirely of indigenous Fijians, who were of mixed Polynesian and Melanesian descent and generally spoke languages of the Malayo-Polynesian language family. After the islands came under British colonial rule, a number of contract workers were brought from present-day British India, spreading the use of the Hindi language.

All three of Fiji's official languages have greatly been influenced by one another, in terms of vocabulary and, in some cases, grammar because of the constant, everyday contact between these languages, now for over a century. Fiji's diverse, multiracial and multilingual makeup make these languages, as well as other unofficial, minority languages in Fiji (such as Chinese varieties, Arabic, Western Fijian, Gilbertese, Rotuman, Tuvaluan, and other present Indian languages), influence one another.

In 2022, Prime Minister Sitiveni Rabuka approved the use of vernacular languages in Parliament.

== English ==
English usage in Fiji predates the cession of Fiji to Great Britain by a few decades. English was first encountered from the first explorers and traders and found greater popularity as a lingua franca (albeit mixed with Fijian in an early and now extinct Pidgin Fijian) between frontier settlers and the indigenous people. By the time of the British administration, much of the Fijian nobility were able to comprehend basic English. The English spoken in Fiji today is very different and has developed significantly over the close to 150 years of usage in the islands.

Like many former colonies of Great Britain, there are certain 'situational varieties' of English present. There is the very formal, 'Proper' English (which would resemble formal English in Australia or the United Kingdom) as it is known, which is to be used in government and any other situation deemed formal enough for its use, but it has fallen out of favor due to the popularity of the more laid back varieties and is still spoken only by the older generation that lived through the colonial days. A sort of mid-level English is used in school, church, work and in semi-formal situations and is basically English with localized grammatical innovations and words imported from Hindi and Fijian; it is quickly becoming 'formal English' in Fiji.

Very informal Fijian English, or Finglish, is used among all races with family, friends and in general conversations and in any other situation not deemed formal. Fiji English has been tentatively studied by linguists and has been suggested as a separate dialect from Standard English (as has developed in Australia and New Zealand) but the distinction is not made locally or in the constitution. Moreover, other linguists suggest it is part of a greater South Pacific English dialect because of the shared development of English within former British colonies and protectorates in the South Pacific.

Fijians, like most Pacific Islanders, have a distinct accent when they are speaking in English. For example, "Fiji" is pronounced as [ˈfi.d͡ʒi] in Fijian English or Finglish, but is pronounced /ˈfiːdʒi/ or /fiːˈdʒiː/ in most other dialects used on the island. As English is overwhelmingly a second language for Fijians, the first language of a speaker (Fijian or Fiji Hindi) significantly affects their pronunciation. Some phonological differences between both groups are:

- Both Fijian and Fiji Hindi speakers have the same phonemic 5-vowel system when speaking English but the exact phonetic realization of the vowels varies
  - Fijian speakers pronounce /ə/ as /ɐ/, while for Fiji Hindi speakers it can be /ə/, /ɐ/ or /a/. In both groups, however, schwa is not phonemically distinct from /a/
  - Fijian speakers maintain /ɒ/ as one phonetic realization of /ɔ/
  - Fijian speakers monophthongize the /ɔɪ/ diphthong into /o/
- Fijian speakers tend to devoice word-final voiced stops
- Fijian speakers sometimes palatalize /d/ before /ju/
- A few Fijian speakers pronounce /b/ as pre-nasalized /ᵐb/
- Fiji Hindi speakers are much less prone to pronounce the alveolar stops /t/ and /d/ as retroflex /ʈ/ and /ɖ/ as they are in Indian English, with them usually being realized as dental stops /t̪/ and /d̪/
- Some fijian speakers realize the voiced labio-dental fricative /v/ as bilabial /β/ word-initially and medially and most realize it as /f/ word-finally. Fiji Hindi speakers have /v/ in free variation with /w/, due to influence of Fiji Hindi.
- Fijian speakers either pronounce the dental fricatives /θ/ and /ð/ as alveolar stops /t/ and /d/ or pronounce both as the voiced dental fricative /ð/. Fiji Hindi speakers on the other hand realize these sounds as dental stops /t̪ʰ/ and /d̪/
- While both groups pronounce the voiceless post-alveolar fricative /ʃ/ as /s/, Fijian speakers in some occasions also pronounce /s/ as /ʃ/, while Fiji Hindi speakers never do
- In both groups the voiced post-alveolar fricative /ʒ/ can be pronounced as /s/ or /ʃ/, but only in Fiji Hindi speakers is it seen pronounced as /z/ and only in Fijian speakers is it seen maintained
- Fijian speakers replace the voiceless post-alveolar affricate /t͡ʃ/ with the alveolar /t͡s/, and its voiced counterpart /d͡ʒ/ can be realized as /t͡s/, /d͡z/ or /t͡ʃ/
- Some Fiji Hindi speakers add an onglide /i/ to words beginning with /j/

On the other hand, some shared phonological features among both groups are:

- Non-rhoticity, that is, /ɹ/ is not pronounced at the ends of syllables
- The following phonemic vowel mergers:
  - KIT and FLEECE are merged into /i/
  - DRESS, TRAP, FACE AND NURSE are merged into /ɛ/
  - FOOT, GOOSE and GOAT are merged into /u/
  - LOT, CLOTH, THOUGHT, NORTH and FORCE are merged into /ɔ/
  - STRUT, BATH, PALM and START are merged into /a/
- Voiceless stops are unaspirated
- In word-final position, voiceless stops are unreleased
- Lack of contrast between /s/ and /ʃ/
- Word-final /z/ is devoiced to /s/
- Post-vocalic /l/ is never velarized
- Initial or medial /ɹ/ is realized as a flap /ɾ/ or a trill /r/
- Consonant clusters are simplified with either an epenthetic vowel, like in film /filam/, or by deleting the final consonant, like in last /las/. The final cluster /ks/ is allowed, and there's metathesis of the /sk/ cluster present, as in ask /aks/

== Fijian ==
An iTaukei speaker, recorded in Fiji.

Fijian is an Austronesian language of the Malayo-Polynesian family spoken in Fiji. It has 300,000 first-language speakers, which is almost one-third of the population of Fiji, but another 300,000 speak it as a second language. The early missionaries selected the Bau dialect or Bauan (which, among the East Fijian dialects, held the place that French would in Europe, while the purer Rewa dialect would be Latin) as the standard dialect for printing and communicating. Bauan soon became the standard of communication among the indigenous Fijians. Bauan was selected not only because of its prestige but also because it was the language of the then politically dominant island of Bau and the Mataiwelagi chiefs (and claimed King of Fiji).

By the middle to the late 19th century, with the push by missionaries, Bauan had also invaded the Western areas of Viti Levu, which spoke an entirely different set of dialects belonging to the West Fijian language, which is grouped with Polynesian and Rotuman in the West Fijian-Polynesian language family and practiced a different culture. This occurred up to the point that many Bauan words entered many western Fijian languages. Bauan was then adopted by the British administration for communication with the iTaukei. Over time, it evolved into what is today Standard Fijian which includes many English and Other Fijian Dialectal contributions, becoming quite distinct from the original Bauan Dialect.

== Hindi ==
Hindi is an official language in Fiji. In the 1997 constitution, it was referred to as "Hindustani", but in the 2013 constitution it is simply called "Hindi".

Fiji Hindi, also known as Fiji Baat, is a vernacular language spoken by most Fijian citizens of Indian descent. It is derived mainly from the Awadhi and Bhojpuri varieties of Hindi. It has also borrowed a large number of words from iTaukei and English. The relation between Fiji Hindi and Standard Hindi is similar to the relation between Afrikaans and Dutch. Indian indentured labourers were initially brought to Fiji mainly from districts of eastern Uttar Pradesh, Bihar, North-West Frontier and South India such as from Andhra and Tamil Nadu. They spoke numerous, mainly Hindi, dialects and languages depending on their district of origin.

Fiji Hindi additionally is developed and influenced from Fijian and other languages, however many people and organisations speak 'Shudh' or standard Hindi from India. Later, approximately 15,000 Indian indentured labourers, who were mainly speakers of Dravidian languages (Telugu, Tamil and Malayalam), were brought from South India. By this time Fiji Hindi was well established as the lingua franca of Fiji Indians and the South Indian labourers had to learn it to communicate with the more numerous North Indians and European overseers. Inward migration of free Gujarati and Punjabi settlers further contributed to Fiji Hindi.

The 2013 constitution (§ 31.3) made conversational Fiji Hindi a compulsory language to be taught in schools. At the same time, Standard Hindi has also officially been used primarily in the field of education, media, and legal purposes. The Hindi variant of the constitution is written in Standard Hindi.

This has led to some controversy, most notably in 2020 when Frank Bainimarama, then prime minister of Fiji, stated that his government would not force any Hindu organisation to teach Fiji Hindi. This came after some Hindu organisations resisted the governments education policy and continued to teach their students only formal standard Hindi as they viewed Fiji Hindi as a broken language. Bainimarama also stated that he agreed schools should teach formal Hindi even if the students were capable of speaking in Fiji Hindi. Some educational institutions opt to teach Standard Hindi rather than Fiji Hindi given the latter does not have an official standard script and has fewer resources available for its teaching.

== Others ==
Fiji is also home to many smaller minorities which make up its multicultural and multilingual populace.

Rotuman, also referred to as Rotunan, Rutuman or Fäeag Rotuma, is an Austronesian language spoken by the indigenous people of the South Pacific island group of Rotuma, an island with a Polynesian-influenced culture that was incorporated as a dependency into the Colony of Fiji in 1881 and later chose to remain with Fiji in 1970 upon independence and in 1987, when Fiji became a republic. The Rotuman language is spoken by more than 2000 people on the island of Rotuma and a further 10,000 people who live or work in the Republic of Fiji.

Other Indian languages are spoken in Fiji. After the indenture system, Indians who spoke Gujarati and Punjabi arrived in Fiji as free immigrants. At present, many free settler descendants in Fiji and their families speak Tamil, Telugu, Punjabi and Gujarati at home, but all speak and communicate with each other in English.

Two significant languages that are seeing growth are Cantonese Chinese and Mandarin Chinese. Many Chinese settlers, especially from southern China speak Cantonese, which is quickly incorporating many Fijian and English words. Many of these migrants are farmers and are constantly exposed to the Fijian and Hindi dominated areas of rural Fiji.

Furthermore, sizeable minorities of Micronesians and Polynesians mean that Fiji is also home to various Micronesian and Polynesian languages. Significant among them is Gilbertese, which is the language of the former residents of Ocean Island or Banaba in Kiribati, which was decimated through British phosphate mining. They were given Rabi Island in North-Eastern Fiji as a new homeland and number 2000–3000. There is also Kioa, which was given to former Tuvaluans, who migrated as a consequence of overcrowding on Vaitupu. They speak Tuvaluan, a Polynesian language, and number around a thousand. Also, there are many Tongan residents and Fijians of Tongan descent in Fiji. These groups speak the Tongan language or a mix of Tongan and Fijian.

== See also ==
- National language debate in Fiji
