= Tench (disambiguation) =

The tench is a species of fish. Tench may also refer to:

== People ==
- Benmont Tench, musician
- Bobby Tench, British musician
- Ethel Tench Rogers, American composer
- Watkin Tench, British marine officer
- Tench Tilghman
- Tench Coxe, American political economist

== Other ==
- Tench language
- Tench Island, an island in the Saint Matthias Islands, Papua New Guinea

== See also ==
- Tench-class submarine
- USS Tench
- Tench (EP), an EP by Shriekback
- Dead Man film character named Benmont Tench, played by actor Jared Harris
