= Island Melanesia =

Subregion of Melanesia in Oceania

Island Melanesia is a subregion of Melanesia in Oceania.

It is located east of New Guinea island, from the Bismarck Archipelago to New Caledonia.

== See also ==
=== Archaeology and social history ===
- Austronesian peoples
- Lapita culture
- Micronesian navigation
- Polynesian navigation

=== Human geography ===
- East Melanesian Islands
- Near Oceania
- Remote Oceania

=== Languages ===
- Central–Eastern Oceanic languages
- Oceanic languages
- Remote Oceanic languages
- Southern Oceanic languages

=== Nations ===
- Bougainville
- Fiji
- New Caledonia
- Solomon Islands
- Vanuatu
