= Western Fijian language =

Oceanic language spoken in Fiji

Western Fijian
- Wayan
- Native to: Fiji
- Region: western half of Viti Levu, Yasawa Islands and Mamanuca Islands
- Native speakers: (57,000 cited 1977)
- Language family: Austronesian: Malayo-Polynesian (MP); Oceanic; Central Pacific; West Fijian – Rotuman; West Fijian; Western Fijian

Language codes
- ISO 639-3: wyy
- Glottolog: west2519

Western Fijian, also known as Wayan is an Oceanic language spoken in Fiji by about 57,000 people.

It is distinct from Eastern Fijian (also known as Bauan or Standard Fijian).

== Phonology ==
Western Fijian consonant phonemes
		Labial	Dental/ Alveolar	Palatal	Velar		Glottal
		Labial	Dental/ Alveolar	Palatal	plain	lab.	Glottal
Nasal		m mː	n		ŋ	ŋʷ	
Plosive	voiced/pren.	ᵐb	ⁿd	ⁿdʒ	ᵑɡ	ᵑɡʷ	
Plosive	voiceless		t	tʃ	k	kʷ	(ʔ)
Fricative	voiced	β	ð				
Fricative	voiceless		s				h
Trill			r ⁿr				
Approximant		w	l	j			

/mː/ is heard in the Wayan dialect.

Western Fijian vowel phonemes
	Front	Central	Back
High	i iː		u uː
Mid	e eː		o oː
Low		a aː	

Most Fijian languages have a unique prenasalized alveolar trill, transcribed here as ⟨ⁿr⟩. Western Fijian in particular, is unique among Fijian languages for having labialized velar consonants. All vowels come in long and short forms, and so does the bilabial nasal (/m/).
