= LLX =

LLX or llx may refer to:

- LLX, the IATA code for Caledonia County Airport, Lyndonville, Vermont, United States
- llx, the ISO 639-3 code for Lauan language, Fiji
