= Central Pacific =

Central Pacific may refer to:

- Central Pacific Railroad, the western part of the Transcontinental Railroad in the United States
- Central Pacific Area, a subdivision of the Pacific Ocean Areas, an Allied military command in World War II
- Central Pacific languages, a branch of the Oceanic languages
