= Malesia =

Biogeographical region in Southeast Asia

Map 1: A very broad definition of Malesia includes both the World Geographical Scheme for Recording Plant Distributions's Malesia (green) and most of its Papuasia (orange).

Malesia is a biogeographical region straddling the Equator and the boundaries of the Indomalayan and Australasian realms. It is a phytogeographical floristic region in the Paleotropical kingdom. It was first recognized as a distinct region in 1857 by Heinrich Zollinger, a Swiss botanist and explorer. The precise boundaries used to define Malesia vary. The broadly defined area used in Flora Malesiana consists of the countries of Malaysia, Singapore, Indonesia, Brunei, the Philippines, Timor-Leste and Papua New Guinea. The original definition by the World Geographical Scheme for Recording Plant Distributions (WGSRPD) covered a similar area, but New Guinea and some offshore islands were split off as Papuasia in its 2001 version.

== Floristic region ==
Map 2 (based on Johns, 1995: fig. 2)

Definitions of Malesia:

- World Geographical Scheme for Recording Plant Distributions (WGSRPD) = Areas A+B (Areas C+D are Papuasia in the WGSRPD)
- Flora Malesiana = Areas A+B+C
- Very broadest = Areas A+B+C+D

Areas:

- A = Western Malesia (Sundaland)
- B = Central Malesia
- C = Eastern Malesia (Sahul Shelf)
- C+D = Papuasia

Malesia was first recognized as a distinct floristic region in 1857 by Heinrich Zollinger, a Swiss botanist and explorer. In 1948 and 1950, Cornelius G. G. J. van Steenis developed the idea of Malesia, and put forward plans for a Flora Malesiana. Van Steenis defined the area of Malesia through the concept of 'demarcation knots': lines across which there are major changes in the genera present in the flora. There were three clear boundaries: between the Malay Peninsula (including part of southern Thailand) and mainland Asia (line 1 in map 2); between the Philippines and Taiwan (line 2 in map 2); and along the Torres Strait between New Guinea and Australia (line 3 in map 2). The eastern boundary was less clear; van Steenis somewhat arbitrarily placed it between the Bismarck and Solomon Islands and the other Pacific islands (line 4 in map 2). Van Steenis initially used Zollinger's name 'Malesia'. He later anglicized it to 'Malaysia', but when the country of Malaysia was formed in 1963, it was necessary to return to the original name.

The first edition of the World Geographical Scheme for Recording Plant Distributions (WGSRPD) used the same definition, but in the second edition of 2001, New Guinea and the Bismarck Archipelago were removed from Malesia and united with the Solomon Islands, previously placed in the WGSRPD's Southwestern Pacific region, and placed into a new region, Papuasia, whose eastern boundary extends to line 5 in map 2.

Using the Flora Malesiana definition, Malesia has a shared tropical flora derived mostly from Asia, but also with numerous elements of the Antarctic flora. Malesia is a hotspot of global biodiversity. In 1995, it was estimated that there were 42,000 species of vascular plants, of which 70% were endemic. By comparison, Europe, which is about three times the area, had 11,000 species of vascular plants, of which about 30% were endemic.

=== Western Malesia (Sundaland) ===
Western Malesia includes the Malay Peninsula and the islands of Sumatra, Java, Bali, and Borneo (area A in map 2). It shares the large mammal fauna of Asia and is known as Sundaland. These islands are on Asia's relatively shallow continental shelf, and were linked to Asia during the ice ages, when sea levels were lower. The south-eastern edge of Sundaland (line 6 in map 2) is the Wallace Line, named after Alfred Russel Wallace, the nineteenth-century British naturalist who noted the difference in fauna between islands on either side of the line.

Dipterocarps are predominant trees in the lowland forests of Sundaland. Sundaland has the greatest diversity of Dipterocarp species, with 10 to 14 native genera and approximately 450 native species, including approximately 267 species on Borneo, 155 on the Malay Peninsula, and 106 on Sumatra.

=== Central Malesia ===
The eastern boundary of central Malesia (area B in map 2) is formed by Lydekker's Line (line 7 in map 2). Central Malesia can be divided into two subareas: the Philippines in the north and Wallacea in the south.

==== Philippines ====
The Philippines form the northern part of central Malesia. Most of the Philippines were never connected to the Asian mainland, and have a largely Asian-derived flora, and a distinct mammalian fauna.

The Philippines have approximately 50 species of Dipterocarps in 11 genera.

==== Wallacea ====
The islands between Sundaland and New Guinea, called Wallacea, form the southern part of central Malesia. They were never linked to the neighboring continents, and have a flora and fauna that include Indomalayan and Australasian elements.

Dipterocarps, which are dominant in Sundaland, are less common in Wallacea, with only 13 species in four genera.

=== Eastern Malesia ===
As defined in Flora Malesiana, Eastern Malesia consists of New Guinea and the Bismarck Archipelago (area C in map 2). The eastern end of this definition of Malesia, which includes New Guinea and the Aru Islands of eastern Indonesia, is linked to Australia by a shallow continental shelf, and shares many marsupial mammal and bird taxa with Australia. New Guinea also has many additional elements of the Antarctic flora, including southern beech (Nothofagus) and eucalypts. New Guinea has the highest mountains in Malesia and Papuasia, and vegetation ranges from tropical lowland forest to tundra.

In the second version of the WGSRPD, New Guinea and the Bismarck Archipelago, together with the Solomon Islands, are placed in Papuasia (areas C and D in map 2) rather than Malesia.

== Assembly and origins of the Malesian flora ==
Major contributions to rainforest assembly have come from floristic elements which were carried on the Indian Plate and montane elements which have come from the Australian Plate (Sahul). The Sahul component is now understood to include substantial two-way exchanges with Sunda inclusive of lowland taxa. Evidence for the relative contributions of the great Asiatic floristic interchanges (GAFIs) with India and Sahul, respectively, to the flora of Malesia comes from contemporary lineage distributions, the fossil record, time-calibrated phylogenies, functional traits, and the spatial structure of genetic diversity. Functional trait and biome conservatism are noted features of montane austral lineages from Sahul (e.g., diverse Podocarpaceae), whereas the abundance and diversity of lowland lineages, including groups such as Syzygium (Myrtaceae) and the Asian dipterocarps (Dipterocarpoideae), reflect a less well understood combination of dispersal, ecology, and adaptive radiations. Thus, Malesian rainforest assembly has been shaped by sharply contrasting evolutionary origins and biogeographic histories.

== See also ==
- Coral Triangle – Ecoregion of Asia–Pacific
- Nusantara – Sociopolitical term for Maritime Southeast Asia
- Phytochorion – Floristic regions and provinces
