= Mussau-Emira language =

Austronesian language of northeast Papua New Guinea

Mussau-Emira
- Native to: Papua New Guinea
- Region: Islands of Mussau and Emirau (New Ireland Province)
- Native speakers: 5,000 (2003)
- Language family: Austronesian: Malayo-Polynesian; Oceanic; St. Matthias; Mussau-Emira

Language codes
- ISO 639-3: emi
- Glottolog: muss1246
- ELP: Mussau-Emira
- Mussau is classified as Definitely Endangered by the UNESCO Atlas of the World's Languages in Danger.

The Mussau-Emira language is spoken on the islands of Mussau and Emirau in the St Matthias Islands in the Bismarck Archipelago.

== Phonology ==
=== Phonemes ===
==== Consonants ====
Mussau-Emira distinguishes the following consonants.

	Bilabial	Alveolar	Velar
Nasal	m	n	ŋ
Plosive	p	t	k
Fricative	β	s	ɣ
Liquid		l ɾ	

- Fricative sounds /β, ɣ/ may also be heard as voiced stop sounds [b, ɡ] in word-initial position and when geminated.

==== Vowels ====
	Front	Central	Back
High	i		u
Mid	ɛ		ɔ
Low		a	

=== Stress ===
In most words the primary stress falls on the penultimate vowel and secondary stresses fall on every second syllable preceding that. This is true of suffixed forms as well, as in níma 'hand', nimá-gi 'my hand'; níu 'coconut', niúna 'its coconut'.

== Morphology ==
=== Pronouns and person markers ===
==== Free pronouns ====
Person	Singular	Plural	Dual	Trial	Paucal
1st person inclusive		ita	italua	itatolu	itaata
1st person exclusive	agi	ami	aŋalua	aŋatolu	aŋaata
2nd person	io	am	amalua	amatolu	amaata
3rd person	ia	ila	ilalua	ilotolu	ilaata

==== Subject prefixes ====
Prefixes mark the subjects of each verb:

- (agi) a-namanama 'I'm eating'
- (io) u-namanama 'you're (sing.) eating'
- (ia) e-namanama 'he's/she's eating'

== Sample vocabulary ==
=== Numbers ===
1. kateva
2. galua
3. kotolu
4. gaata
5. galima
6. gaonomo
7. gaitu
8. gaoalu
9. kasio
10. kasaŋaulu
