= National language debate in Fiji =

Debate on the status of the three official languages

The National Language Debate in Fiji concerns the status of the country's three official languages: English, Fijian, and Hindustani (the name used in the 1997 constitution for Fiji Hindi). From colonial times, the sole official language was English, but the 1997 Constitution gave equal status for the first time to Fijian and Hindustani on the same level as English.

== Compulsory subject? ==
There is considerable debate as to whether Fijian and possibly also Hindi, should be compulsory school subjects. In May and June 2005, a number of prominent Fiji Islanders called for the status of Fijian to be upgraded; Education Minister Ro Teimumu Kepa endorsed calls for it to be made compulsory, and Great Council of Chiefs Chairman Ratu Ovini Bokini did the same. Similar calls came from Misiwini Qereqeretabua, the director of the Institute of Fijian Language and Culture, and from Apolonia Tamata, a linguistics lecturer at Suva's University of the South Pacific, both of whom said that recognition of the Fijian language is essential to the nation's basic identity, as a unifying factor in Fiji's multicultural society.

The Fiji Labour Party (FLP) leader Mahendra Chaudhry also endorsed the call for Fijian to be made a national language and a compulsory school subject if the same status was given to Hindi, a position echoed by Krishna Vilas of the National Reconciliation Committee.

The academic and former Education Minister Taufa Vakatale said that she supported making Hindi available in all schools but considered that Fijian should get priority. "If the Indians in the country lost their language, there is a whole continent of people in India who would still have the language"," she said. "In the whole world only 330,000 people know how to speak in Fijian and if it is lost, there is nowhere it can be revived from, that is why the Fijian language is very important to preserve".

An investigation by the Rewa Provincial Council was made public on 23 November 2005 and revealed that 26% of indigenous children in the first and second grades of nine Rewa schools could not speak their own language. The council was exploring ways to redress that area of concern.

Vice-President Ratu Joni Madraiwiwi added his own voice on 9 January 2006 to the campaign to make Fijian a compulsory subject. Addressing the 72nd annual meeting of the Fijian Teachers Association in Suva, Madraiwiwi said that it was dangerous to assume that Fijian children would automatically learn their own language. His parents' generation had emphasized prioritizing English on the assumption that Fijian could be learned later, but that resulted in a generation knowing little Fijian. Unless the language was made compulsory at all levels of primary education, it would be lost to the next generation, he said.

== Why Fijian? ==
Kamlesh Arya, the president of the Arya Pratindhi Sabha, said on 29 June 2005 that language was the window by which people could appreciate and absorb tradition and that making both Fijian and Hindustani compulsory school subjects would promote social and cultural understanding between the two races. He said that his organization taught Fijian to Indo-Fijian students in primary schools at its own expense. The geographical and numerical limitations of the Fijian language needed it to be given special attention on its own merit.

The Fiji Labour Party member Gaffar Ahmed spoke on 4 August 2005 for establishing Fijian as the national language. He told the Fiji House of Representatives, "To achieve national unity, multi-cultural and multi-racial harmony, we should have one common language which must be taught at all schools".. He said that his own inability to speak Fijian was his greatest handicap as a Fijian citizen.

== See also ==
- Culture of Fiji
