= Cape Provinces =

Biogeographical area of South Africa

WGSRPD areas of South Africa; CPP = Cape Provinces

The Cape Provinces of South Africa is a biogeographical area used in the World Geographical Scheme for Recording Plant Distributions (WGSRPD). It is part of the WGSRPD region 27 Southern Africa. The area has the code "CPP". It includes the South African provinces of the Eastern Cape, the Northern Cape and the Western Cape, together making up most of the former Cape Province.

The area includes the Cape Floristic Region, the smallest of the six recognised floral kingdoms of the world, an area of high diversity and endemism, home to more than 9,000 vascular plant species, of which 69 percent are endemic.

WGSRPD codes

27 Southern Africa

- CPP Cape Provinces
  - CPP-EC Eastern Cape Province
  - CPP-NC Northern Cape Province
  - CPP-WC Western Cape Province

== See also ==
- Category:Flora of the Cape Provinces
- Northern Provinces

== Bibliography ==
- Brummitt, R.K. (2001). World Geographical Scheme for Recording Plant Distributions: Edition 2 (PDF). International Working Group on Taxonomic Databases For Plant Sciences (TDWG).
