= Namosi-Naitasiri-Serua language =

Oceanic language of Fiji

Namosi-Naitasiri-Serua
- Native to: Fiji
- Region: Namosi, Serua, Naitasiri provinces
- Native speakers: (1,600 cited 2000)
- Language family: Austronesian: Malayo-Polynesian; Oceanic; Central Pacific; West Fijian – Rotuman; West Fijian; Namosi-Naitasiri-Serua

Language codes
- ISO 639-3: bwb
- Glottolog: namo1248

Namosi-Naitasiri-Serua is an Oceanic language spoken in Fiji by about 1,600 people.
