= Proto–Central Pacific language =

Reconstructed ancestor of the Central Pacific languages

Proto–Central Pacific
- PCP
- Reconstruction of: Central Pacific languages
- Region: Fiji
- Reconstructed ancestors: Proto-Austronesian: Proto-Malayo-Polynesian; Proto-Oceanic
- Lower-order reconstructions: Proto-Polynesian

Proto–Central Pacific (abbreviated as PCP) is the reconstructed ancestor of the Central Pacific languages. It belongs to the Oceanic branch of the Austronesian languages.

It was first proposed by George W. Grace in 1959, who also named the subgroup in 1967. It was reconstructed by C. F. Hockett in 1976.

== Descendants ==
Proto–Central Pacific, originally spoken by Lapita settlers in Fiji three millennia ago, separated into a dialect network, consisting of what would become a western dialect (ancestral to Rotuman and western Fijian dialects) and an eastern dialect (ancestral to eastern Fijian dialects and Proto-Polynesian). Later, the dialects that remained in Fiji converged back, eventually becoming more similar, leading to the present-day Fijian language.

== Phonology ==
The phonology of Proto–Central Pacific, according to Geraghty (1986), are:

Consonants
		Bilabial	Dental	Alveolar	Palatal	Velar	Labiovelar	Glottal
Nasal		*m ⟨*m⟩	*n ⟨*n⟩		*ɲ ⟨*ñ⟩	*ŋ ⟨*g⟩	*ŋʷ ⟨*gw⟩	
Stop	voiceless	*p ⟨*p⟩	*t ⟨*t⟩			*k ⟨*k⟩	*kʷ ⟨*kw⟩	*ʔ
Stop	prenasalized	*ᵐb ⟨*b⟩		*ⁿd ⟨*d⟩, *ⁿdr ⟨*dr⟩		*ᵑg ⟨*q⟩	*ᵑgʷ ⟨*qw⟩	
Affricate					*t͡ʃ ⟨*j⟩			
Fricative		*β ⟨*v⟩	*ð ⟨*c⟩	*s ⟨*s⟩	*ʑ ⟨*z⟩	*x ⟨*x⟩		
Sonorant				*l ⟨*l⟩, *r ⟨*r⟩	*j ⟨*y⟩		*w ⟨*w⟩	

Vowels
	short		long	
	front	back	front	back
Close	*i	*u	*ī	*ū
Close-mid	*e	*o	*ē	*ō
Open	*a		*ā	

The orthography used is similar to that of Fijian.

== Example sentence ==
From Kikusawa (2000, 167)

*Na=ᵑgu tirovi=a i aku (ʔi na vale).
PST=1SG.GEN see=3SG PRS 1SG LOC DET house
'I saw him (in the house).'
