= Lomaiviti language =

East Fijian language

Lomaiviti
- Native to: Fiji
- Region: Koro, Makogai, Levuka, Ovalau, Batiki, Nairai, Gau islands
- Native speakers: (1,600 cited 2000)
- Language family: Austronesian: Malayo-Polynesian; Oceanic; Central Pacific; East Fijian; Lomaiviti

Language codes
- ISO 639-3: lmv
- Glottolog: loma1261

Lomaiviti is an East Fijian language spoken by about 1,600 people on a number of islands of Fiji.
