= Gone Dau language =

East Fijian language

Gone Dau
- Native to: Fiji
- Region: Gone and Dau Islands, Eastern Fiji
- Native speakers: (690 cited 2000)
- Language family: Austronesian: Malayo-Polynesian; Oceanic; Central Pacific; East Fijian; Gone Dau

Language codes
- ISO 639-3: goo
- Glottolog: gone1237

Gone Dau (pronounced [ŋo.ne ⁿdɔu̯]) is an East Fijian language spoken by about 500 people on the islands of Galoa and Tavea in the Gone Dau islands off the coast of Western Vanua Levu, Fiji.
