= Central–Eastern Oceanic languages =

Oceanic language family branch

Central–Eastern Oceanic
- Geographic distribution: Eastern Solomon Islands, Vanuatu, New Caledonia, Micronesia, and Polynesia
- Linguistic classification: Austronesian: Malayo-Polynesian; Oceanic; Central–Eastern Oceanic
- Proto-language: Proto-Central–Eastern Oceanic
- Subdivisions: Southeast Solomonic; Southern Oceanic linkage; Micronesian; Central Pacific

Language codes
- Glottolog: None
- The branches of CE Oceanic; Dark red = Southeast Solomons; Blue = Southern Oceanic; Pink = Micronesian; Ocher = Fijian-Polynesian (not shown: Rapa Nui); The black oval between red and blue is the Temotu languages.

The over 200 Central–Eastern Oceanic languages form a branch of the Oceanic language family within the Austronesian languages.

== Languages ==
Traditional classifications have posited a Remote Oceanic branch within this family, but this was abandoned in Lynch et al. (2002), as no defining features could be found for such a group of languages.

- Southeast Solomonic
- Southern Oceanic linkage (non-Polynesian languages of Vanuatu and New Caledonia)
- Micronesian
- Central Pacific (Fijian dialects spoken in Fiji and Polynesian)

In 2007 Ross & Næss moved the Utupua-Vanikoro languages from Central-Eastern Oceanic to the newly established Temotu branch of Oceanic.

== See also ==
- Remote Oceanic languages
