= Remote Oceanic languages =

Subgroup of Austronesian languages

Remote Oceanic
- (proposed)
- Geographic distribution: Oceania, Polynesia
- Linguistic classification: Austronesian: Malayo-Polynesian; Central–Eastern; Eastern Malayo-Polynesian?; Oceanic; Central-Eastern Oceanic; Remote Oceanic
- Subdivisions: Central Pacific; Eastern Outer Islands; Loyalty Islands; Micronesian; New Caledonian; North and Central Vanuatu

Language codes
- Glottolog: None

A family of some 200 Remote Oceanic languages has traditionally been posited as a subgroup of the Central-Eastern Oceanic languages. However, it was abandoned by Lynch, Ross, & Crowley in 2002, as no defining features of the family could be found.

== Languages ==
Its components are:

- Central Pacific languages
- Eastern Outer Islands languages
- Loyalty Islands languages
- Micronesian languages
- New Caledonian languages
- North and Central Vanuatu languages

== See also ==
- Oceanic languages
- Remote Oceania
