= Lauan language =

Oceanic language spoken in Fiji

Lauan
- Native to: Fiji
- Region: Lau, Nayau, Lakeba, Oneata, Moce, Komo, Namuka, Kabara, Vulaga, Ogea, Vatoa islands
- Native speakers: (16,000 cited 1981)
- Language family: Austronesian: Malayo-Polynesian; Oceanic; Central Pacific; East Fijian; Lauan

Language codes
- ISO 639-3: llx
- Glottolog: laua1243

Lauan is an East Fijian language spoken by about 16,000 people on a number of islands of eastern Fiji.

Lauan is spoken in the Lau Province. However, the number of Lauan speakers has been declining due to the presence of other languages, which have become more dominant.
