= Emirau Island =

Island in Papua New Guinea

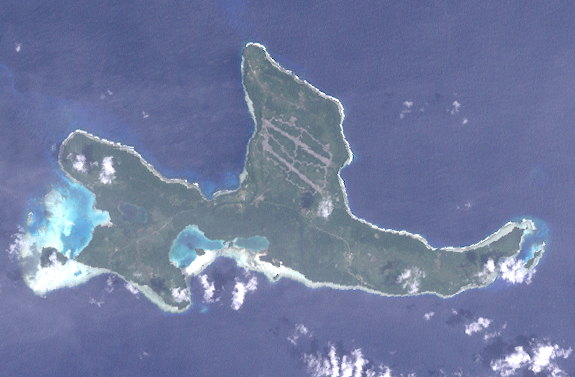
Satellite image of Emirau Island

Emirau Island, also called Emira, is an island in the Bismarck Archipelago located at 1°38.5′S 149°58.5′E. Emira is part of what on many maps are charted as the St Matthias Islands, also known as the Mussau Islands, a small group to the northwest of the main island group of New Ireland. Early explorers named it Squally Island, a name found in some early records. It is part of New Ireland Province, Papua New Guinea. The local language is a dialect of the Mussau-Emira language.

== World War II ==
Early in World War II this small island became international news when over 500 prisoners from various ships (including RMS Rangitane) sunk by German surface raiders were released following the first attack on Nauru and subsequently rescued by the Australian authorities.

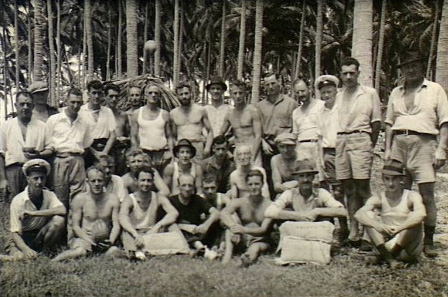
Released prisoners on Emirau

Emirau was seized unopposed by two battalions of the United States 4th Marine Division on 20 March 1944.

=== Base development ===
Naval Base Emirau construction activities were taken in hand by the US Navy Seabees of the 18th Construction Regiment, which consisted of the 27th, 61st, and 63rd Construction Battalions and the 17th Special Battalion, which arrived between 25 and 30 March, and the 77th Construction Battalion which arrived on 14 April. The 27th built a PT boat base, an LCT floating dry dock and slipway, and roads. The 61st constructed housing, ammunition storage facilities, a runway, and some of the buildings at the PT boat base. It also handled sawmill operations. The 63rd assisted at the sawmill and worked on the roads, camps, harbor facilities, warehouses, magazines and avgas dumps. The 77th built taxiways, hardstands, aviation workshops and the avgas tank farm. The 88th worked on runways, roads, radar stations and a causeway at the eastern end of the island.

Two airfields were constructed, Inshore and North Cape. These were heavy bomber strips, 7,000 feet (2,100 m) long and 300 feet (91 m) wide. The former had parking for 210 fighters or light bombers; the latter for 84 heavy bombers. Both were fully equipped with towers, lighting, and a dispensary. The aviation tank farm consisted of three 10,000-barrel (~1,400 t) and nineteen 1,000-barrel (~140 t) tanks together with the appropriate filling and distribution points. A reserve of 40,000 barrels (~5,500 t) was stored in drums. Three hospitals were established, a 100-bed naval base hospital, the 160-bed 24th Army Field Hospital, and the 150-bed Acorn 7 Hospital. The anchorage at Hamburg Bay could accommodate up to five capital ships. Port facilities included eight cranes, 42,000 cubic feet (1,200 m^{3}) of refrigerated space, and 400,000 square feet (37,000 m^{2}) of covered storage. The port could handle 800 measurement tons (910 m^{3}) of cargo per day. Connecting the various facilities was 40 miles (64 km) of coral-surfaced all-weather road. All this work was completed by August and Construction Battalion Maintenance Unit (CBMU) 502 assumed responsibility for maintenance work. All the construction battalions departed by December.

=== Garrison ===
The 4th Marines were relieved as the garrison of Emirau by the 147th Infantry on 11 April 1944. The next day, General Alfred H. Noble was replaced as island commander by Marine aviator Major General James T. Moore, the commanding general of the 1st Marine Aircraft Wing. In turn, the 147th Infantry was relieved as garrison by the 369th Infantry in June.

In August, General Douglas MacArthur directed that responsibility for garrisoning Emirau would be transferred to the Australian Army. The Australian 8th Infantry Battalion arrived to take over the garrison role on Emirau on 30 September. They were met by a small ANGAU detachment that had been on the island since May. Marine Aircraft Group 12 operated from Emirau until December, when it moved to Leyte, its place was taken by squadrons of the Royal New Zealand Air Force (RNZAF).

On 20 March 1945, MacArthur authorized a reduction in the garrison size to one company of the 8th Infantry Battalion. In June 1945, it too was withdrawn. CBMU 502 departed for Manus Island that month. The RNZAF maintained a bomber-reconnaissance squadron at Emirau until July 1945 and a fighter squadron until August, when all forces were withdrawn from the island.

=== PT boat operations ===
USN PT boats were based on Emirau Island. Squadron 11-2 (including PT-177, PT-182, PT-185, and PT-186), under the command of Lieutenant John H. Stillman, was transferred to Emirau Island in May 1944.

== See also ==
- Emirau Airport
