= Fiji Hindi =

Indo-Aryan language of most Indo-Fijians

- Fiji Baat
- फ़िजी हिंदी
- Fiji Hindi written in the Devanagari script
- Native to: Fiji
- Ethnicity: Indo-Fijians and the Indo-Fijian diaspora
- Native speakers: (380,000 cited 1991)
- Language family: Indo-European: Indo-Iranian; Indo-Aryan; Central and Eastern; Eastern Hindi and Bihari; Awadhi, Bhojpuri and Maithili; Fiji Hindi
- Early forms: Vedic Sanskrit: Classical Sanskrit; Ardhamagadhi and Magadhi Prakrit (Note: Bhojpuri is descended from Magadhi Prakrit and Awadhi is descended from Ardhamagadhi Prakrit); Ardhamagadhi and Magadhan Apabhraṃśa (Note: Bhojpuri is descended from Magadhan Apabhraṃśa and Awadhi is descended from Ardhamagadhi Apabhraṃśa); Abahattha (Note: Only Bhojpuri is descended from Abahattha, not Awadhi. Awadhi comes straight from Ardhamagadhi Apabhraṃśa); Awadhi and Bhojpuri
- Dialects: Pidgin Hindustani
- Writing system: Devanagari (co-official); Latin (co-official)

Official status
- Recognised minority language in: Fiji

Language codes
- ISO 639-3: hif
- Glottolog: fiji1242
- Linguasphere: 59-AAF-raf

Fiji Hindi (Devanagari: फ़िजी हिंदी) is a vernacular Eastern Hindi language spoken by Indo-Fijians. It is the mother tongue and indigenous language of Indo-Fijians. It is also looked at as a creole or koine language based on Awadhi that has also been subject to considerable influence by other Eastern Hindi languages such as Bagheli and Chhattisgarhi, by Eastern Indo-Aryan languages such as Bhojpuri and Maithili, and has also been partially influenced by many other languages such as English, iTaukei, Telugu, Tamil, Bengali, Assamese, Punjabi, Standard Hindi, Standard Urdu, Marathi, Gujarati, Arabic, and Malayalam. Many words unique to Fiji Hindi have been created to cater for the new environment that Indo-Fijians now live in. First-generation Indo-Fijians in Fiji, who used the language as a lingua franca in Fiji, referred to it as Fiji Baat, "Fiji talk".

While Fiji Hindi is mutually intelligible with various Eastern Hindi languages, it is also closely related to other variants of Hindustani spoken in the Caribbean (such as Sarnami) and Africa (especially in the countries of Mauritius and South Africa).

== History ==
Initially, the majority of indentured labourers came to Fiji from Bengal and districts of central and eastern Uttar Pradesh and Bihar, while a small percentage hailed from North-West Frontier and Madras Presidency places that are now Andhra Pradesh, Tamil Nadu, Kerala, Karnataka, Odisha and Telangana in the late 19th and early 20th centuries.

Over time, a distinct Indo-Aryan language with an Eastern Hindi substratum developed in Fiji, combining elements of the South Asian Languages spoken in these areas with some native Fijian and English. The development of Fiji Hindi was accelerated by the need for labourers speaking different languages to work together and by the practice of leaving young children in early versions of day-care centers during working hours. Percy Wright, who lived in Fiji during the indenture period, wrote:

Indian children born in Fiji will have a mixed language; there are many different dialects amongst the Indian population, and of course much intercourse with the Fijians. The children pick up a little of each language, and do not know which is the one originally spoken by their parents.

Other writers, including Burton (1914) and Lenwood (1917), made similar observations. By the late 1920s all Fiji Indian children born in Fiji learned Fiji Hindi, which became the common language in Fiji of North and South Indians alike.

Later, approximately 15,000 Indian indentured labourers, who were mainly speakers of Dravidian languages (Tamil, Telugu, Malayalam, Kannada, Tulu, Gondi, and Kodava), were brought from South India.

By this time Fiji Hindi was well established as the lingua franca of Indo-Fijians and the Southern Indian labourers had to learn it to communicate with the more numerous Northern Indians and their European overseers.

After the end of the indenture system, Indians who spoke Gujarati and Punjabi arrived in Fiji as free immigrants. A few Indo-Fijians speak Tamil, Telugu, and Gujarati at home, but all are fluently conversant and able to communicate using Fiji Hindi.

== Status ==
Pidgin Hindustani
- Language family: Fiji Hindi-based pidgin

Language codes
- ISO 639-3: None (mis)
- Glottolog: pidg1251

The census reports of 1956 and 1966 shows the extent to which Fiji Hindi (referred to as 'Hindustani' in the census) was being spoken in Indo-Fijian households. Conversational Fiji Hindi alongside iTaukei are compulsory subjects in all Fijian schools. In addition, students in the Indo-Fijian community also learn Standard Hindi, Urdu and other Indian languages like Tamil.

Although in 2020, then Prime Minister of Fiji Frank Bainimarama stated that his government would not force any Hindu organisation to teach Fiji Hindi. This came after some Hindu organisations resisted the governments education policy and continued to teach their students only formal standard Hindi as they viewed Fiji Hindi as a broken language. Prime Minister Bainimarama also stated that he agreed schools should teach formal Hindi even if the students were capable of speaking in Fiji Hindi.

Language	Number of households in 1956	Number of households in 1966
Fijian Hindustani	17,164	30,726
Hindi	3,644	783
Tamil	1,498	999
Urdu	1,233	534
Gujarati	830	930
Telugu	797	301
Punjabi	468	175
Malayalam	134	47
Other	90	359

Fiji Hindi is also understood and even spoken by Indigenous Fijians in areas of Fiji where there are large Indo-Fijian communities. A pidgin form of the language is used by rural ethnic Fijians, as well as Chinese on the islands, while Pidgin Fijian is spoken by Indo-Fijians.

Following the recent political upheaval in Fiji, many Indo-Fijians have emigrated to Australia, New Zealand, Canada and the United States, where they have largely maintained their traditional Indo-Fijian culture, language, and religion.

Some writers have begun to use Fiji Hindi, until very recently a spoken language only, as a literary language. The Bible has now been translated into Fiji Hindi, and the University of the South Pacific has recently begun offering courses in the language. It is usually written in the Latin script, though Devanāgarī is also used, particularly in signage and education.

A Fiji Hindi movie has also been produced depicting Indo-Fijian life and is based on a play by local playwright, Raymond Pillai.

== Phonology ==
The phonemes of Fiji Baat are very similar to standardised Hindi but there are some important distinctions as observed in Eastern Hindi dialects. For example in the Bhojpuri and Awadhi spoken in rural India, mainly Bihar and Eastern Uttar Pradesh — the consonant /ʃ/ is replaced with /s/ (for example, saadi instead of shaadi) and /ʋ/ replaced with /b/ (for example, bid-es instead of videsh). There is also a tendency to ignore the differences between the consonants /pʰ/ and /f/ (In Fiji Hindi a fruit is fal instead of phal) and between /d͡ʒ/ and /z/ (in Fiji Hindi land is jameen instead of zameen). The consonant /n/ is used in Fiji Hindi for the nasal sounds /ɳ/ in Standard Hindi/Urdu. These features are common in the Eastern Hindi dialects. Some other characteristics of Fiji Hindi which is similar to Bhojpuri and Awadhi are:

- Pronunciation of the vowels ai and au as diphthongs /ɐɪ ɐʊ/, rather than monophthongs /ɛː ɔː/ (as in standard Hindi). For example, bhauji (sister-in-law) and gaiya (cow).
- Coda clusters are removed with the use of epenthetic vowels. For example, dharm (religion) is pronounced as dharam.
- Shortening of long vowels before a stressed syllable. For example, Raajen (a common name) is pronounced as Rajen.

== Pronouns ==
Pronoun	Fiji Hindi	Standard Hindi
I	Hum	मैं/हम (Mai/Hum)
You (Informal)	Tum	तुम (Tum)
You (Formal)	Aap	आप (Aap)
We	Hum log	हम (लोग) (Hum Log)

== Morphology ==
=== Verb ===
==== Etymology ====
In Fiji Hindi verb forms have been influenced by a number of languages in India. First and second person forms of verbs in Fiji Hindi are the same. There is no gender distinction and number distinction is only in the third person past tense. Although, gender is used in third person past tense by the usage of "raha" for a male versus "rahi" for a female.

The use of the first and second person imperfective suffixes -taa, -at are of Awadhi origin. Example: तुम मन्दिर जाता हैं / तुम मन्दिर जात हैं। "tum Mandir jaata hai/tum Mandir jaat hai." (You are going to the Temple).

While the third person imperfective suffix -e is of Bhojpuri origin. Example: ई बिल्ली मच्छरी खावे हैं। "Ee billi macchari KHAWE hai." (This cat is eating a fish).

The third person perfective suffixes (for transitive verbs) -is and -in are also derived from Awadhi. Example: किसान गन्ना काटीस रहा। "Kisaan ganna katees raha." (The farmer cut the sugarcane). पण्डित लोगन रामायण पढ़ीन रहा/पण्डित लोगन रामायण पढ़े रहीन। "Pandit logan Ramayan padheen raha/padhe raheen." (The priests read the Ramayana).

The third person definite future suffix -ii is found in both Awadhi and Bhojpuri. Example: प्रधानमंत्री हमलोग के पैसा दई। "Pradhanamantri humlog ke paisa daii" (The prime minister will give us money).

The influence of Hindustani is evident in the first and second person perfective suffix -aa and the first and second person future suffix -ega. Example: हम करा। तुम करेगा। "Hum karaa, tum karega." (I did, you will do).

The origin of the imperative suffix -o can be traced to the Magahi dialect. Example: तुम अपन मुह खोलो। "Tum apan muh kholo." (You open your mouth). Spoken in the Gaya and Patna districts, which provided a sizeable proportion of the first indentured labourers from Northern India to Fiji.

Fiji Hindi has developed its own polite imperative suffix -naa. Example: आप घर के सफा कर लेना। "Aap ghar ke sapha kar Lena." (You clean the house (polite)).

The suffix -be, from Bhojpuri, is used in Fiji Hindi in emphatic sentences.

Another suffix originating from Awadhi is -it. Example: ई लोगन पानी काहे नहीं पीत हैं। "Ee logan paani kahey nahi peet hai." (Why aren't these people drinking water?), but is at present going out of use.

==== Tenses ====
Fiji Hindi tenses are relatively similar to tenses in Standard Hindi & Standard Urdu. Bhojpuri and Awadhi influence the Fiji Hindi tenses.

Sentence	Fiji Hindi	Standard Hindi
To come	आना Aana	आना ānā
Come!	आओ; Aao!	आओ! āo!
(I) am coming	हम आत (आवत) हैं Ham aat (aawat) hai	मैं आ रहा हूँ ma͠i ā rahā hū̃
(I) came	हम आया रहा Ham aaya raha	मैं आया ma͠i āyā
(I) will come	हम आयेगा Ham aayega	मैं आऊंगा ma͠i āūṅgā
(I) was coming	हम आत (आवत) रहा Ham aat (aawat) raha	मैं आ रहा था ma͠i ā rahā thā
(I) used to play	हम खेलत रहा Ham khelat raha	मैं खेला करता था ma͠i khelā kartā thā
(He/she/they) is/are coming	ऊ आवे हैं / ऊ लोगन आत हैं oo aawe hai / oo logan aat hai	वो आ रहा है / वह आ रही है / वे आ रहे हैं vo ā rahā hai / vah ā rahī hai / ve ā rahe ha͠i
(He/she) came	ऊ आईस; Oo Aais	वह आया / वह आई vah āyā / vah āī
(They) came	ऊ लोगन आईन; Oo logan Aain	वे आये ve āye

== Grammatical features ==
- Fiji Hindi does not have plurals. For example, one house is ek gharr and two houses is dui gharr. In this example, the number is used to denote plurality. Plurals can also be stated with the use of log. For example, ee means "this person" (singular) and ee log means "these people" (plural). Sabb (all) and dHerr (many) are also used to denote plural. There are some exceptions, however. For example, a boy is larrka (single) but boys are larrkan (plural). Older generations still use a similar form of plural, for example, admian, for more than one man (singular: admi).
- There is no definite article ("the") in Fiji Hindi, but definite nouns can be made by adding the suffix wa; for example, larrka (a boy) and larrkwa (the boy). Definite nouns are also created using the suffix "kana"; for example, chhota (small) and chhotkana (the small one). Another way of indicating a definite article is by the use of pronouns: ii (this), uu (that) and wahii (the same one).

== Fijian words used ==
Indo-Fijians now use Fijian words for those things that were not found in their ancestral India but which existed in Fiji. These include most fish names and root crops. For example, kanade for mullet (fish) and kumaala for sweet potato or yam. Other examples are:

Fiji Hindi			
Latin Script	Devanāgarī Script	Fijian origin	Meaning
nangona	नंगोना	yaqona	kava
tabale	तबाले	tavale	wife's brother
bilo	बिलो	bilo	cup made of coconut, used to drink kava
marama	मरामा	marama	wife

== Words derived from English ==
Many English words have also been implemented into Fiji Hindi with sound changes to fit the Indo-Fijian pronunciation. For example, hutel in Fiji Hindi is borrowed from hotel in English. Some words borrowed from English have a specialised meaning, for example, garaund in Fiji Hindi means a playing field, geng in Fiji Hindi means a "work gang", particularly a cane-cutting gang in the sugar cane growing districts and tichaa in Fiji Hindi specifically means a female teacher. There are also unique Fijian Hindi words created from English words, for example, kantaap taken from cane-top means slap or associated with beating.

== Semantic shifts ==
=== Indian languages ===
Many words of Hindustani origin have shifted meaning in Fiji Hindi. These are due to either innovations in Fiji or continued use of the old meaning in Fiji Hindi when the word is either not used in Standard Hindi/Urdu anymore or has evolved a different meaning altogether. Some examples are:

Fiji Hindi word	Fiji Hindi meaning	Original Hindustani meaning
baade	flood	flooding
bekaar	bad, not good, useless	unemployed, nothing to do, or useless
bhagao	elope	abduct
bigha	acre	1 bigha = 1600 square yards or 0.1338 hectare or 0.3306-acre (1,338 m^{2})
bihaan	tomorrow	tomorrow morning (Bhojpuri)
Bombaiyaa	Marathi/Gujaratis (Indians)	from what is today the former Bombay Presidency
fokatiyaa	useless	bankrupt
gap	lie	gossip, idle talk, chit chat
jaati	race	caste (more often misused/misunderstood as a term to reference a native Fijian)
jhaap	shed	temporarily built shed
jor	fast, quick	force, strength, exertion
juluum	beautiful	tyranny, difficulty, amazing (Hindustani zalim, meaning "cruel", is metaphorically used for a beautiful object of affection)
kal	yesterday	yesterday or tomorrow
kamaanii	small spear (for prawns)	wire, spring
khassi	male goat	castrated animal
konchij	what	from kaun chij (Awadhi), literally meaning what thing or what stuff
maalik	god	employer/owner or god
Mandaraaji	South Indian	original word, Madraasi, meant "from Madras (or Tamil Nadu)"
palla	door	shutter
Punjabi	Sikh	native of Punjab, regardless of religion

=== English ===
Many words of English origin have shifted meaning in Fiji Hindi.

English word	Fiji Hindi meaning
purse	wallet
theatre	cinema
teacher	female teacher
engine	locomotive (in addition to usual vehicle/boat engines)
pipe	tap (faucet) (in addition to artificially made tubes)
cabbage	Chinese cabbage or bok choy
set	everything is ok (used as a statement or question)
right	ok (used as a statement)

== Counting ==
Though broadly based on standard Hindi, counting in Fiji Hindi reflects a number of cross-language and dialectal influences acquired in the past 125 years.

The pronunciation for numbers between one and ten show slight inflections, seemingly inspired by Eastern Hindi languages such as Awadhi. The number two, consequently, is दो (do) in standard Hindi/Urdu, while in Fiji Hindi it is dui (दुइ), just as it is in Awadhi, Bhojpuri & Nepali.

Words for numbers between 10 and 99 present a significant difference between standard and Fiji Hindi. While, as in other Indo-Aryan languages, words for numbers in standard Hindustani are formed by mentioning units first and then multiples of ten, Fiji Hindi reverses the order and mentions the tens multiple first and the units next, as is the practice in many European and South-Indian languages. That is to say, while "twenty-one" in Standard Hindi/Urdu is (ikkīs), an internal sandhi of ek aur biis, or "one-and-twenty", in Fiji Hindi the order would be reversed, and simply be biis aur ek, without any additional morpho-phonological alteration. Similarly, while the number thirty-seven in standard Hindi/Urdu is (saintīs), for saat aur tiis or "seven-and-thirty", the number would be tiis aur saat, or 'thirty-and-seven' in Fiji Hindi.

Additionally, powers of ten beyond ten thousand, such as lakh (100,000) and crore (10 million), are not used in Fiji Hindi.

Numeral	English	Hindi/Urdu	Fiji Hindi
21	twenty-one	(ikkīs)	bis aur ek
22	twenty-two	(bāīs)	bis aur dui
23	twenty-three	(teīs)	bis aur teen
31	thirty-one	(ikattīs)	tiis aur ek
32	thirty-two	(battīs)	tiis aur dui
33	thirty-three	(taintīs)	tiis aur teen
41	forty-one	(iktālīs)	chaalis aur ek
42	forty-two	(bayālīs)	chaalis aur dui
43	forty-three	(taintālīs)	chaalis aur teen

== Spread overseas ==
With political upheavals in Fiji, beginning with the first military coup in 1987, large numbers of Indo-Fijians have since migrated overseas and at present there are significant communities of Indo-Fijian expatriates in Australia, New Zealand, Canada and the United States. Smaller communities also reside on other Pacific Islands and Britain. The last census in each of the countries where Fiji Hindi is spoken (counting Indo-Fijians who were born in Fiji) provides the following figures:

Country	Number of Fiji-born Indo-Fijians
Fiji	313,798
New Zealand	27,882
Australia	27,542
United States	24,345
Canada	22,770
Tonga	310

== Writers ==
- Rodney F. Moag, who had lived in India before joining the University of the South Pacific as a lecturer. He analysed Fiji Hindi and concluded that it was a unique language with its own distinct grammar, rather than "broken Hindi", as it had been previously referred to. Moag documented his findings and wrote lessons using the Fijian Hindi dialect in the book, Fiji Hindi: a basic course and reference grammar (1977).
- Jeff Siegel, in his thesis on Plantation languages in Fiji (1985), has written a detailed account of the development of Fiji Hindi and its different forms as used by Indo-Fijians and Indigenous Fijians. Earlier, Siegel had written a quick reference guide called Say it in Fiji Hindi (1976).
- Raman Subramani, professor in literature at the University of the South Pacific, who wrote the first Fiji Hindi novel, Duaka Puraan (Devanagari: डउका पुरान, 2001), which is the story of Fiji Lal (an old villager) as told by him to a visiting scholar to his village. The book is written in the style of the Puraans (sacred texts) but in a humorous way. He received a Government of India award for his contribution to Hindi language and literature for this novel. In June 2003, in Suriname at the Seventh World Hindi Conference, Professor Subramani was presented with a special award for this novel.
- Vimal Reddy wrote the story for the first Fiji Hindi movie, Adhura Sapna (Devanagari: अधूरा सपना, "Incomplete Dream"), produced in 2007.
- Urmila Prasad, who helped translate the Biblical Gospels of Mark, Luke, Matthew and John into Fiji Hindi, written using Roman script, known as Susamaachaar Aur Romiyo (2002)

== See also ==
- Girmityas, the descendants of late 18th and early 19th century labourers who were brought or emigrated to Fiji from India
- Hindustani language
- Caribbean Hindustani, a similar language developed under similar conditions in the Caribbean
- Surinamese Hindustani, spoken by people of Indian origin in Suriname
- Mauritian Bhojpuri, spoken by descendants of Girmityas in Mauritius

== Bibliography ==
- Siegel Jeff, Plantation Languages in Fiji, Australian National University, 1985 (Published as Language Contact in a Plantation Environment: A Sociolinguistic History of Fiji, Cambridge University Press, 1987, recently reprinted in paperback).
- Siegel, Jeff (1977). Say it in Fiji Hindi. Sydney: Pacific Publications (Aust) Pty Ltd. ISBN 0-85807-026-X.
- Moag, Rodney F. (1977). Fiji Hindi: A basic course and reference grammar. Canberra: Australian National University. ISBN 0-7081-1574-8.
- Barz, Richard K.; Jeff Siegel (1988). Language transplanted: the development of overseas Hindi. Wiesbaden: OttoHarrassowitz. ISBN 3-447-02872-6.
