= Tenis language =

Moribund Austronesian language of Papua New Guinea

Tenis
- Tench
- Native to: Papua New Guinea
- Region: Tench Island (New Ireland Province)
- Native speakers: (30 cited 2000)
- Language family: Austronesian: Malayo-Polynesian; Oceanic; St. Matthias; Tenis

Language codes
- ISO 639-3: tns
- Glottolog: teni1244
- ELP: Tenis
- Tench is classified as Critically Endangered by the UNESCO Atlas of the World's Languages in Danger.

Tenis, or Tench, is the nearly extinct language of Tench Island in the St Matthias Islands of the Bismarck Archipelago.
