= St. Matthias languages =

Oceanic language pair of Papua New Guinea

Saint Matthias
- Geographic distribution: Papua New Guinea
- Linguistic classification: Austronesian: Malayo-Polynesian; Oceanic; Meso-Melanesian ?; Core Meso-Melanesian; Saint Matthias
- Subdivisions: Mussau-Emira; Tenis

Language codes
- Glottolog: stma1240
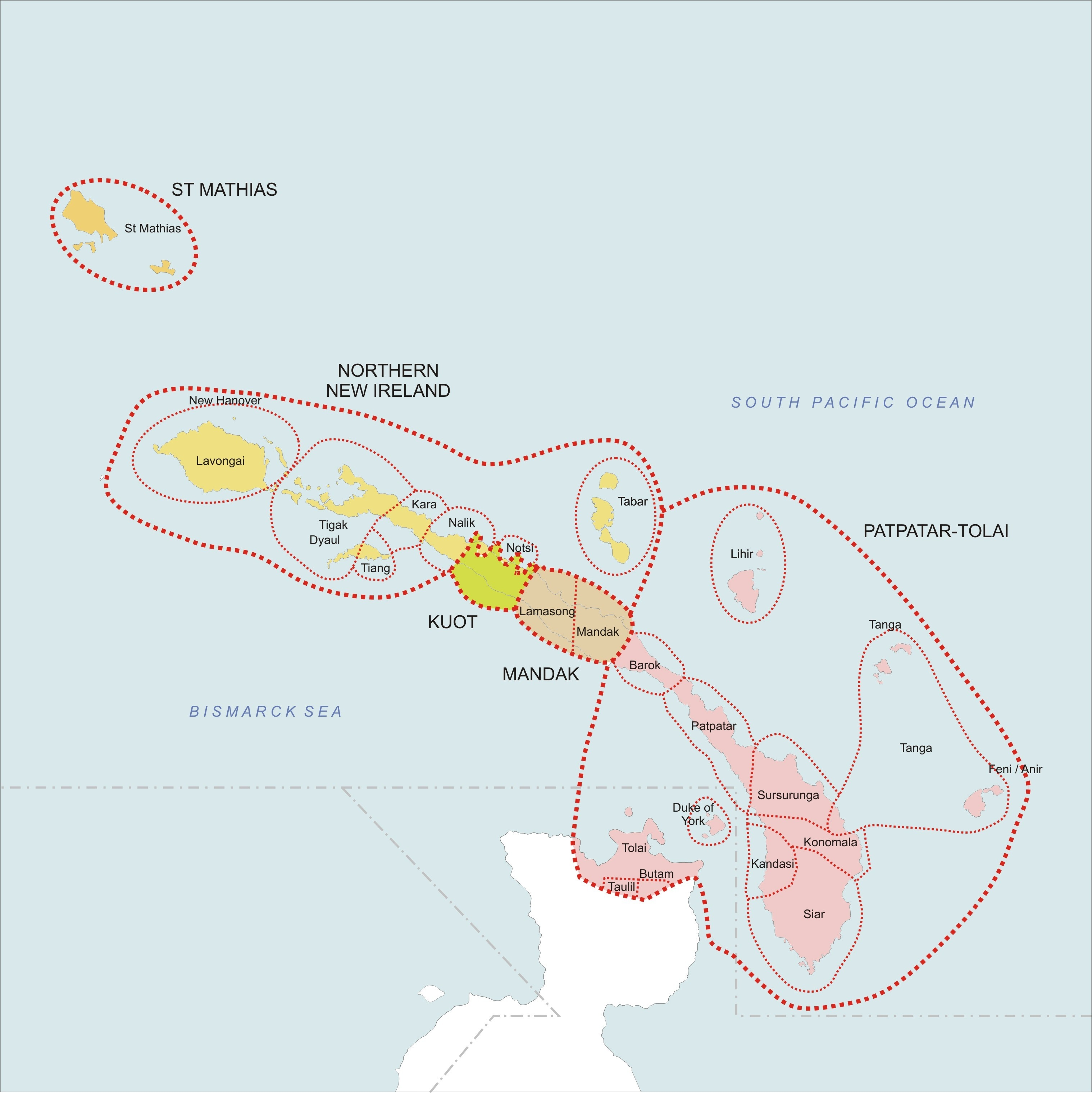
- Linguistic map of New Ireland Province, Papua New Guinea; the St Matthias languages are in the northwest

The St. Matthias languages are a small group of Oceanic languages spoken in the St. Matthias Islands of New Ireland Province, Papua New Guinea.

They are generally treated as a distinct subgroup within the Oceanic branch of the Austronesian language family.

The group consists of two languages:

- Mussau-Emira
- Tenis

They are generally treated as a distinct subgroup within the Oceanic branch of the Austronesian language family.

== Classification ==
The St. Matthias languages are generally recognized as a distinct subgroup of the Oceanic languages consisting of Mussau-Emira and Tenis. Malcolm Ross identified the group as separate from the major Western Oceanic linkages, and later classifications have continued to treat the St. Matthias languages as an independent branch or linkage within Oceanic.

Ross, Pawley and Osmond (2016) classified the St. Matthias languages as one of the primary branches of the Oceanic language family, comprising the Mussau and Tenis languages.
