= Tench Island =

Island of Papua New Guinea

Coordinates: 1°38′52″S 150°40′22″E

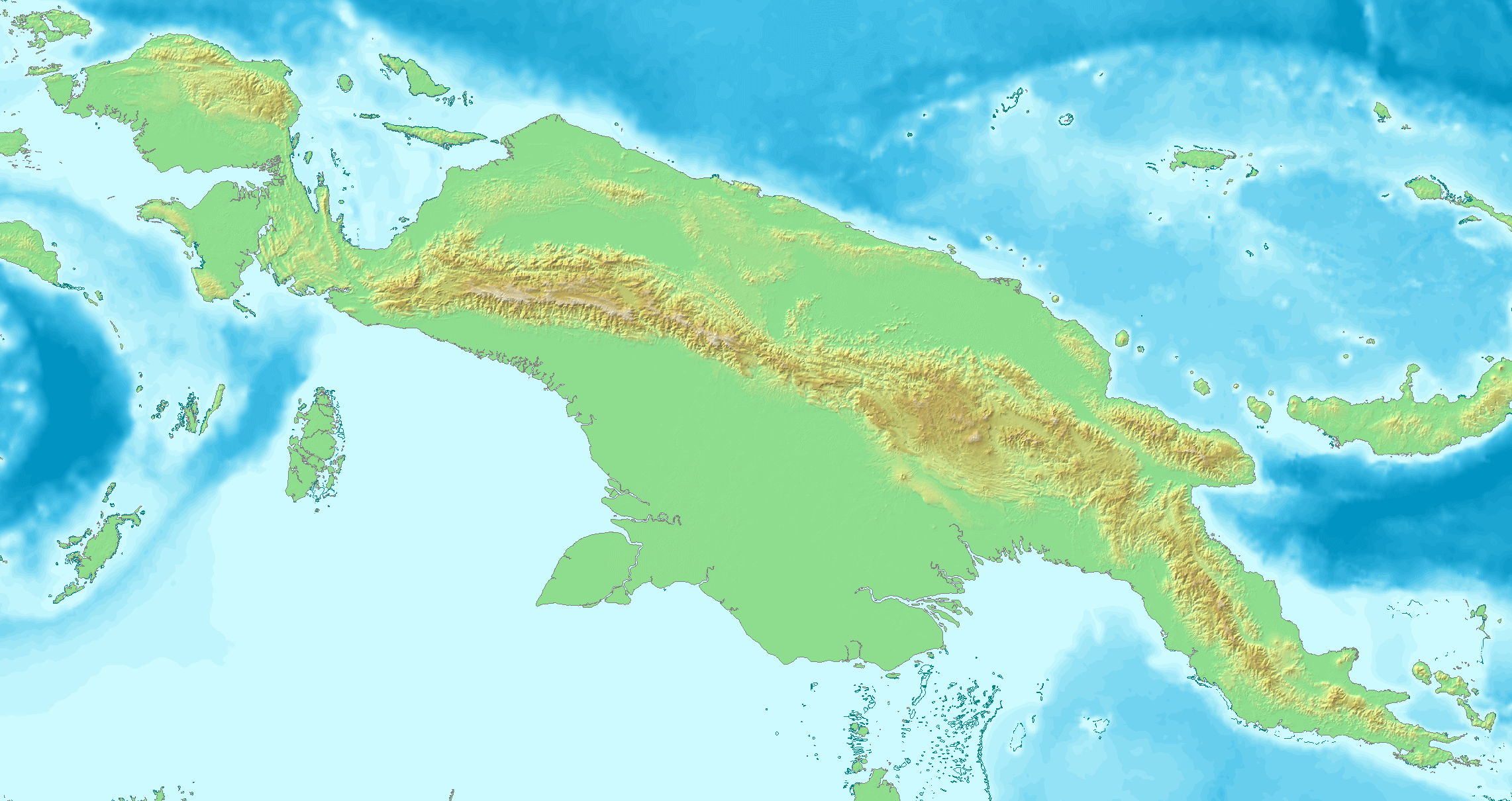
Location of Tench Island

Enusi, also known as Tench Island, is a small (55 ha (140 acres)), low-lying (17 m (56 ft) maximum height above sea level), coral island in the St Matthias Islands group in the Bismarck Archipelago of Papua New Guinea. Administratively, it is part of New Ireland Province and lies about 100 km (62 mi; 54 nmi) north of Kavieng, the provincial capital. It has a human population of about 100. The language of Tenis is spoken on the island, which has around 30 native speakers.

It is featured in the fifth episode of the 2026 series Pole to Pole with Will Smith, highlighting the environmental challenges the island has faced.

== History ==
Originally called Enusi by the founders of the island, the island was changed to Tench after being found by British marine officer Watkin Tench in 1790 by Lieutenant Philip Gidley King.

== Important Bird Area ==
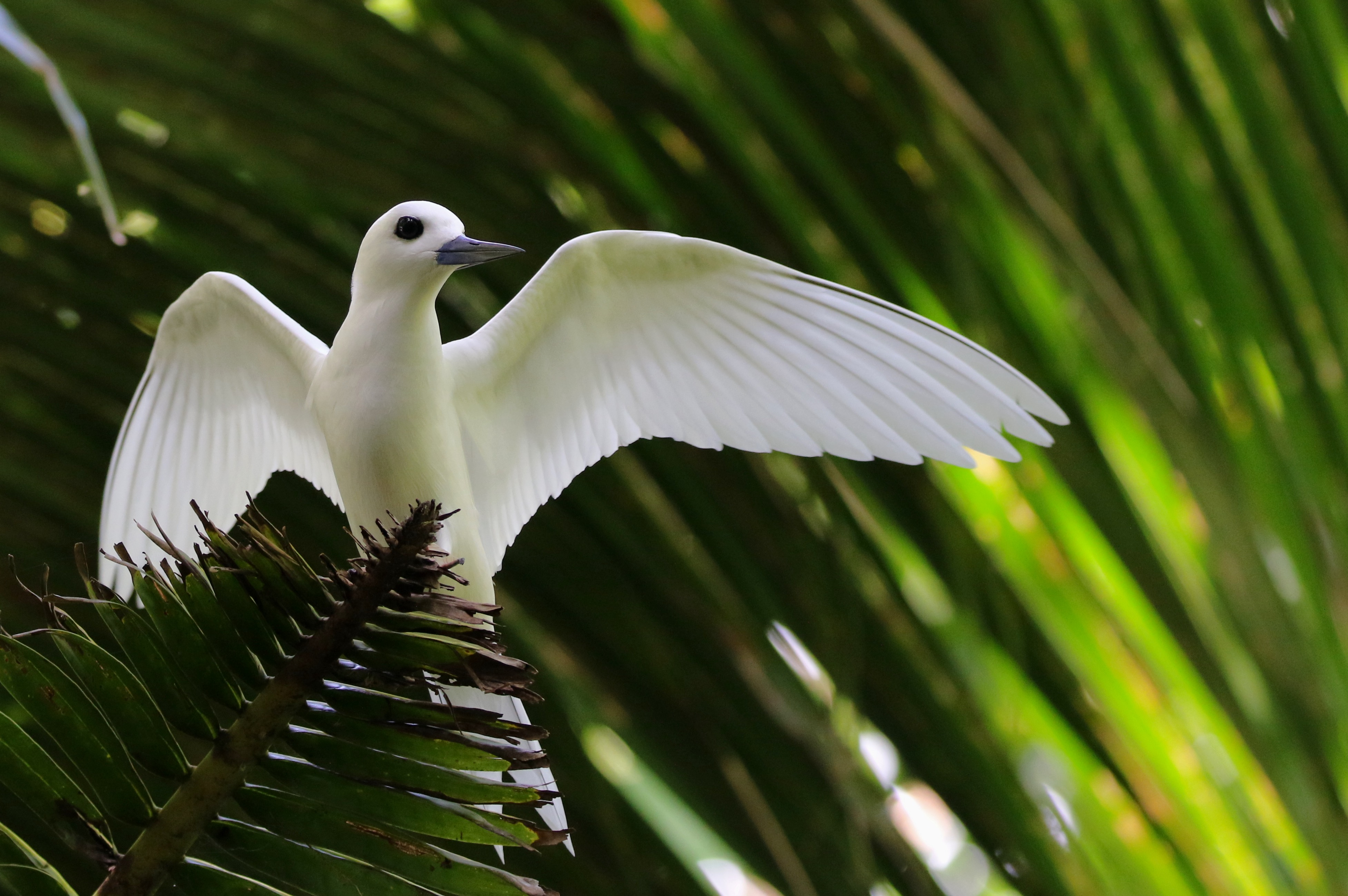
White tern (Gygis sp.) on Tench Island

The island has been designated an Important Bird Area (IBA) by BirdLife International because it supports breeding populations of brown noddies (80,000 individuals) and black noddies (20,000 individuals), based on 1973 estimates.
