= Papuasia =

Biogeographic region

Papuasia as defined by the WGSRPD

Papuasia is a Level 2 botanical region defined in the World Geographical Scheme for Recording Plant Distributions (WGSRPD). It lies in the southwestern Pacific Ocean, in the Melanesia ecoregion of Oceania and Tropical Asia.

It comprises the following geographic and political entities:

- Aru Islands (Indonesia; treated as part of Western New Guinea in the Scheme)
- New Guinea
  - Papua New Guinea
  - Western New Guinea (Indonesia)
- Solomon Islands (archipelago)
  - Bougainville
  - Solomon Islands (excluding the Santa Cruz Islands)
