= Near Oceania and Remote Oceania =

Islands of Oceania near to Australia

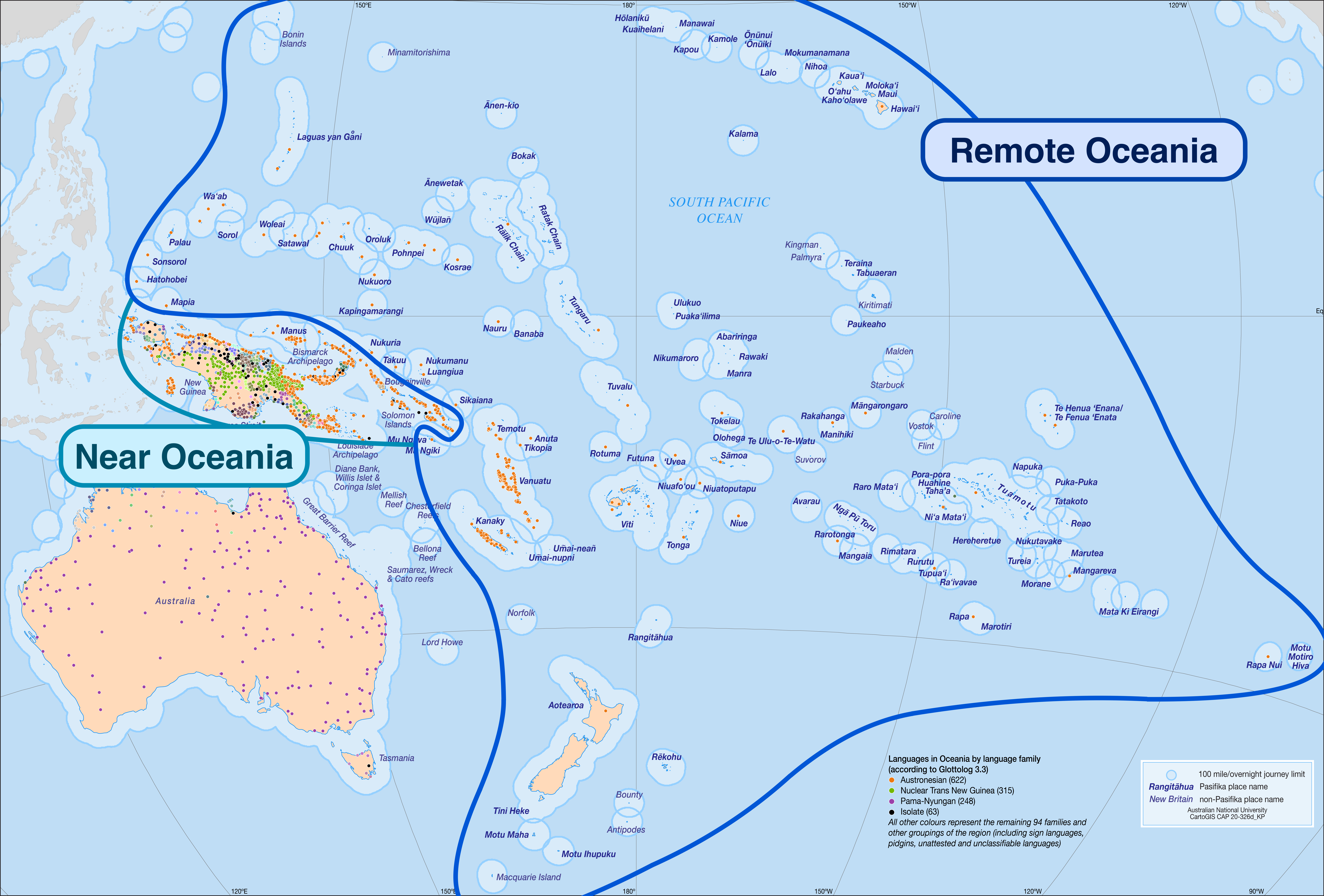
Map displaying Near Oceania and Remote Oceania.

Near Oceania and Remote Oceania are the parts of Oceania that are distinct based on geology, flora, fauna, and prehistoric human settlement. The distinction between the two was first suggested by Pawley & Green (1973) and was further elaborated on in Green (1991).

Near Oceania includes the Bismarck Archipelago, the island of New Guinea, and the Solomon Islands archipelago, with Australia also occasionally included. It features greater biodiversity, due to the islands and atolls being closer to each other. Remote Oceania, which is more widely spread out across the Pacific Ocean, includes the rest of Melanesia (the Santa Cruz Islands, Vanuatu, Fiji and New Caledonia) and the islands of Polynesia and Micronesia.

== Etymology ==
The terms Near Oceania and Remote Oceania were proposed by anthropologists Roger Curtis Green and Andrew Pawley in 1973. By their definition, Near Oceania consists of the Bismarck Archipelago, New Guinea, and the Solomon Islands, with the exception of the Santa Cruz Islands. They are designed to dispel the outdated categories of Melanesia, Micronesia, and Polynesia; Near Oceania cuts right across the old category of Melanesia, which has shown to be not a useful category in respect to the geography, culture, language and human history of the region. The old categories have been in use since they were proposed by French explorer Jules Dumont d'Urville in the mid-19th century. Though the push of some people in academia has been to replace the categories with Green's terms since the early 1990s, the old categories are still used in science, popular culture and general usage.

== Prehistory ==
=== Near Oceania ===
When the naturalist Alfred Russel Wallace explored Nusantara, he drew attention to fundamental biological differences between the Australia-New Guinea region and Southeast Asia. The boundary between the Asian and Australian faunal regions consists of a zone of smaller islands bearing the name of Wallacea, in honor of the co-discoverer of the theory of natural selection. Wallace speculated that the key to understanding these differences would lie in "now-submerged lands, uniting islands to continents" (1895).

At several intervals during the Pleistocene, the sea surface was 130 metres below the current sea level, joining the Aru Islands, New Guinea, Tasmania, and some smaller islands to the Australian mainland. Biogeographers referred to this enlarged Greater Australian continent as "Sahul" (Ballard, 1993) or "Meganesia". West of Wallacea, the vast Sunda Shelf was also exposed as dry land, greatly extending the Southeast Asian mainland to include the Greater Sunda Islands of Sundaland. However, the islands of Wallacea (primarily Sulawesi, Ambon, Ceram, Halmahera, and the Lesser Sunda Islands) always remained an island world, imposing a barrier to the dispersal of terrestrial vertebrates, including early hominids.

To the north and east of New Guinea, the islands of Near Oceania (the Bismarck Archipelago and the Solomons) were likewise never connected to Sahul by dry land, for deep-water trenches also separate these from the Australian continental shelf.

Human colonization of this region was most likely effected during the interval between 60,000 and 40,000 years ago, although some researchers hypothesized possible earlier dates. Regardless, even during the period when the sea level was at its lowest, there were always significant open-water gaps between the islands of Wallacea, and therefore, the arrival of humans into Sahul necessitated over-water transport. This was also the case of the expansion of humans beyond New Guinea into the archipelagoes of Near Oceania.

According to Spriggs (1997):

The settlement of Manus — in the Admiralty Islands — may represent a real threshold in voyaging ability as it is the only island settled in the Pleistocene beyond the range of one-way intervisibilty. Voyaging to Manus involved a blind crossing of some 60–90 km in a 200–300 km voyage, when no land would have been visible whether coming from the north coast of Sahul or New Hanover at the northern end of New Ireland. These would have been tense hours or days on board that first voyage and the name of Pleistocene Columbus who led this crew will never been known. The target arcs for Manus are 15° from New Hanover, 17° from Mussau and 28° from New Guinea. (Matthew Spriggs, The Island Melanesians, Oxford: Blackwell, 1997)

=== Remote Oceania ===
The islands of Remote Oceania were not settled until around the 12th century BC, when seafaring navigators of the Austronesian Lapita culture settled in the region. Paleogenetic analyses indicated that the original settlers of the islands originated from Neolithic populations in Taiwan and the northern Philippines, corresponding to the early expansion of Austronesian peoples. Many contemporary populations of western Remote Oceania nonetheless have a strong Papuan ancestry linked to a second expansion that began around the 1st millennium BC.

== See also ==
- East Melanesian Islands
- Micronesian navigation
- Polynesian navigation
- Remote Oceanic languages
