= Mussau Island =

Island in the New Ireland Province of Papua New Guinea

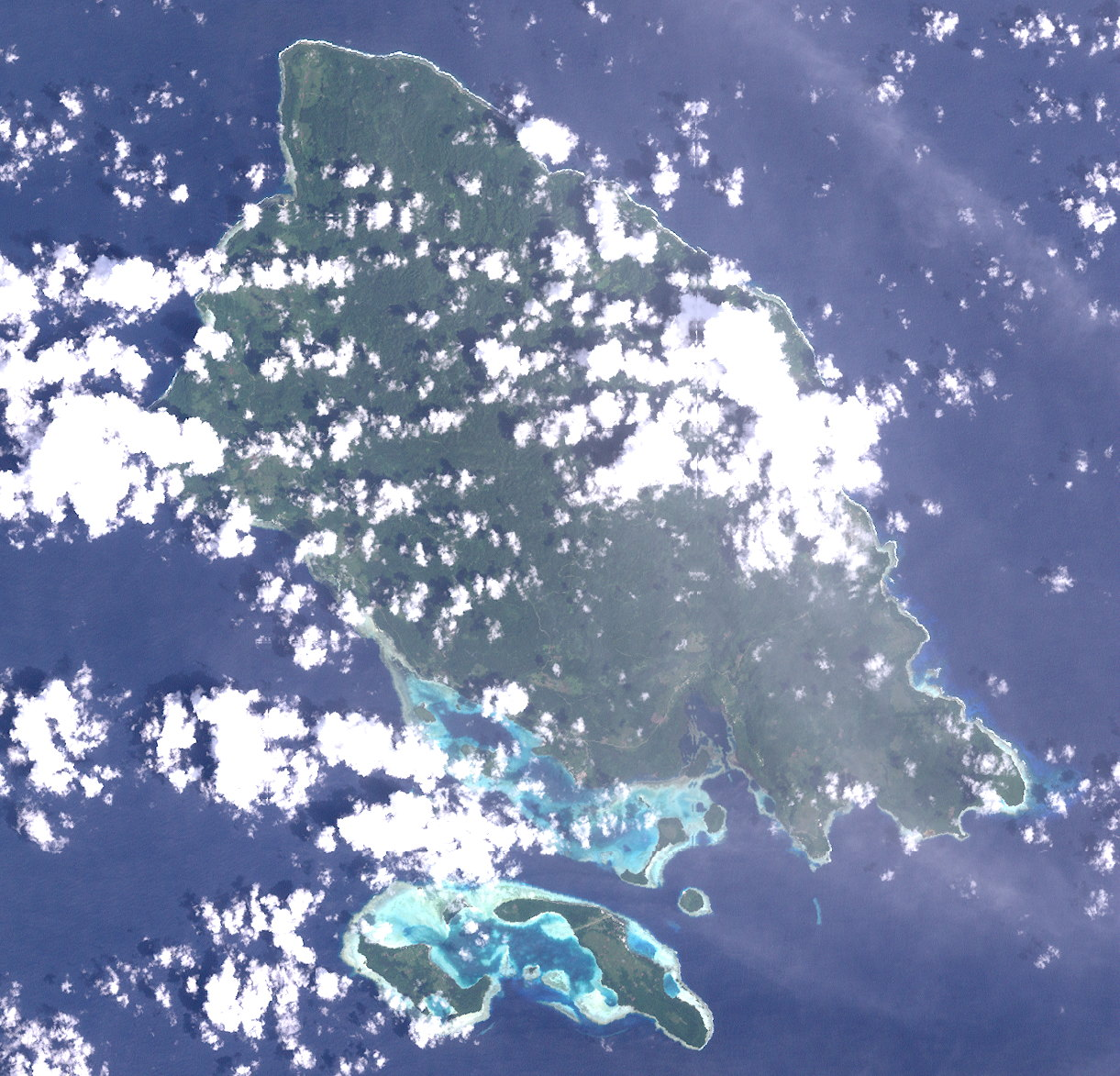
Mussau Island seen from space

Mussau Island is the largest island of St Matthias Islands, Papua New Guinea, at 1°25′01″S 149°37′59″E. It is part of the New Ireland Province of Papua New Guinea. The island is a noted biodiversity hotspot with pristine primeval rainforest covering most of Mussau's hilly landscape. The island has over 243 endemic plant species as well as at least 47 native butterfly species.
