= Pidgin Fijian =

Fijian-based pidgin

- Language family: Fijian-based pidgin

Language codes
- ISO 639-3: None (mis)
- Glottolog: pidg1237

Pidgin Fijian (also known as Jargon Fijian, Fijian Pidgin, Broken Fijian) was a plantation language used by iTaukei (Indigenous) Fijians and foreigners in Fiji's plantations.

== History ==
Indigenous Fijians first came into contact with Europeans in 1800s when a few sailors were stranded in a shipwreck. After that initial incident, contact between Indigenous Fijians and Europeans became common. The Europeans then started to exploit Fiji's resources. The cotton plantation industry began in the 1860s. The development of Pidgin Fiji is correlated with the development of plantation agriculture in Fiji.

At this point, the Europeans only used Fijian labourers and needed a form of communication to use between them. The cotton industry collapsed in 1870, but the European settlers found other crops, such as sugar, to farm. The plantation industry then grew, compelling the European settlers to recruit more labourers from neighbouring Pacific Islands.

The new labour workers came from various islands with around 180 different languages. Because there was a need for communication and there was no mutually intelligible language between all, Jargon Fijian was modified and became the lingua franca on the plantations.

The sugar plantation industry rapidly grew. With a higher demand for labourers, the European settlers recruited labourers from India. Between 1879 and 1916, over 60 000 Indians from vast areas of India were brought to Fiji as labour workers. Jargon Fijian was being used more often, leading to its pidginization.

== Features ==
Pidgin Fijian began as a jargon and developed into a pidgin but never extended further into an extended pidgin or pidgin creole. Pidgin Fijian has features that can trace to simplifications made by Indigenous Fijians to make it easier for foreigners to learn. There is evidence of modifications that were errors made by Europeans and other foreigners.

English was not a target language in Pidgin Fijian. The European settlers were given orders to learn the language of the labourers and believed that non-Europeans should not learn English to put them in their "place."
