= St Matthias Islands =

Island group in Papua New Guinea

Coordinates: 1°35′S 149°49′E

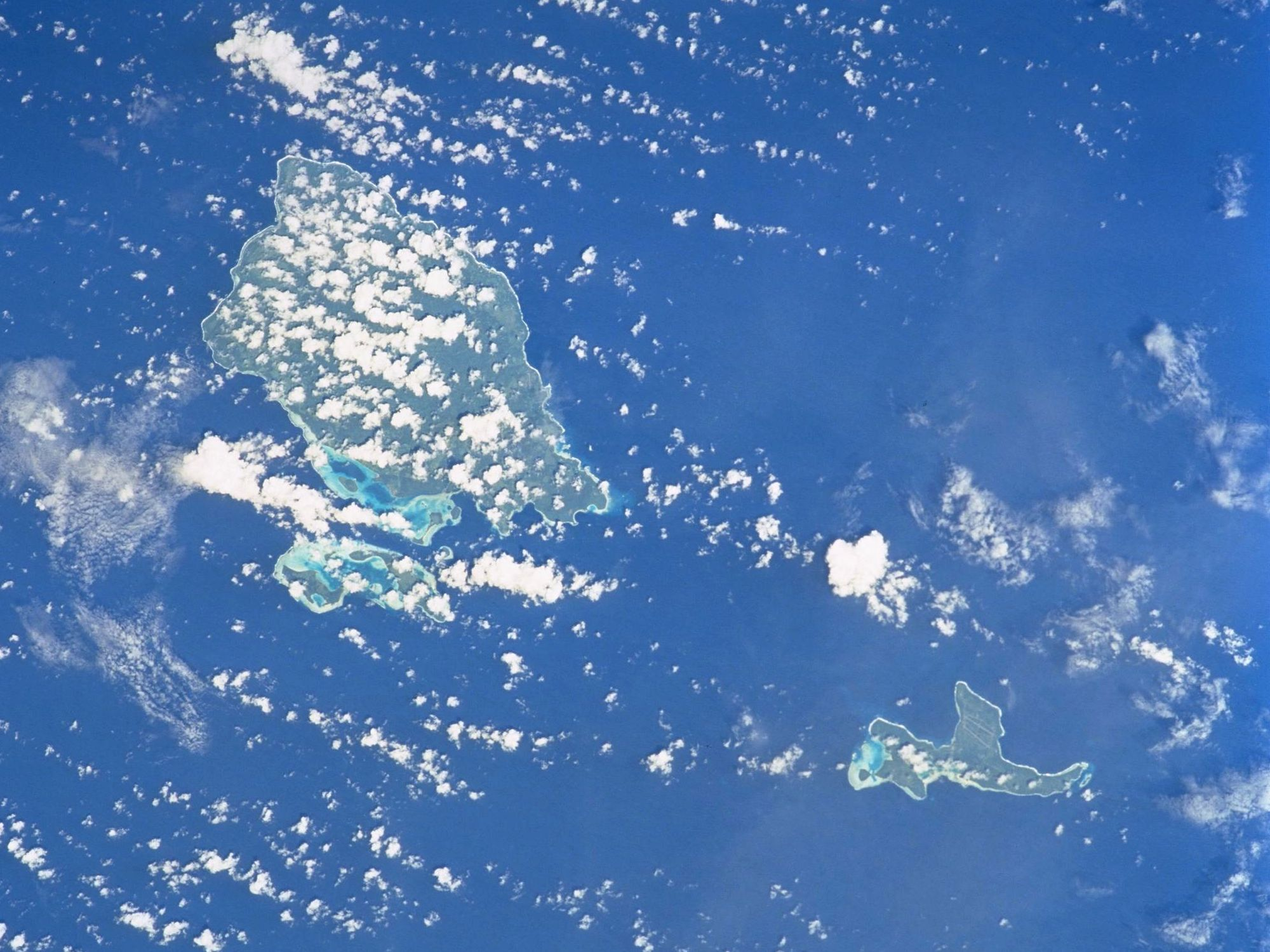
Satellite image of the St Matthias Islands

The St Matthias Islands (also known as the Mussau islands) are a small archipelago group of islands in the Bismarck Archipelago, in northern Papua New Guinea. They are within New Ireland Province. The archipelago is home to the St. Matthias languages.

== Geography ==
There are at least 10 islands. The largest and most northerly is Mussau.

To the southwest of Mussau are: Eloaua, Emananus, Boliu, Emussau, Ebanalu, Ekaleu, and a few smaller isles. To the east of Mussau are: Emirau, and further east is Tench Island.

The islands have been designated as an Endemic Bird Area by Birdlife International.
