= Fijian language =

Austronesian language of Fiji

Fijian
- Vosa Vaka-Viti
- Native to: Fiji
- Ethnicity: Fijians
- Native speakers: (339,210 cited 1996 census); 320,000 second-language users (1991)
- Language family: Austronesian: Malayo-Polynesian; Oceanic; Central Pacific; East Central Pacific; East Fijian; Fijian
- Early forms: Proto-Austronesian: Proto-Malayo-Polynesian; Proto-Oceanic; Proto-Central Pacific; Proto-East Central Pacific; Proto-East Fijian; Old Fijian
- Standard forms: Standard Fijian
- Dialects: Pidgin Fijian
- Writing system: Latin-based

Official status
- Official language in: Fiji

Language codes
- ISO 639-1: fj
- ISO 639-2: fij
- ISO 639-3: fij
- Glottolog: fiji1243
- Linguasphere: 39-BBA-a
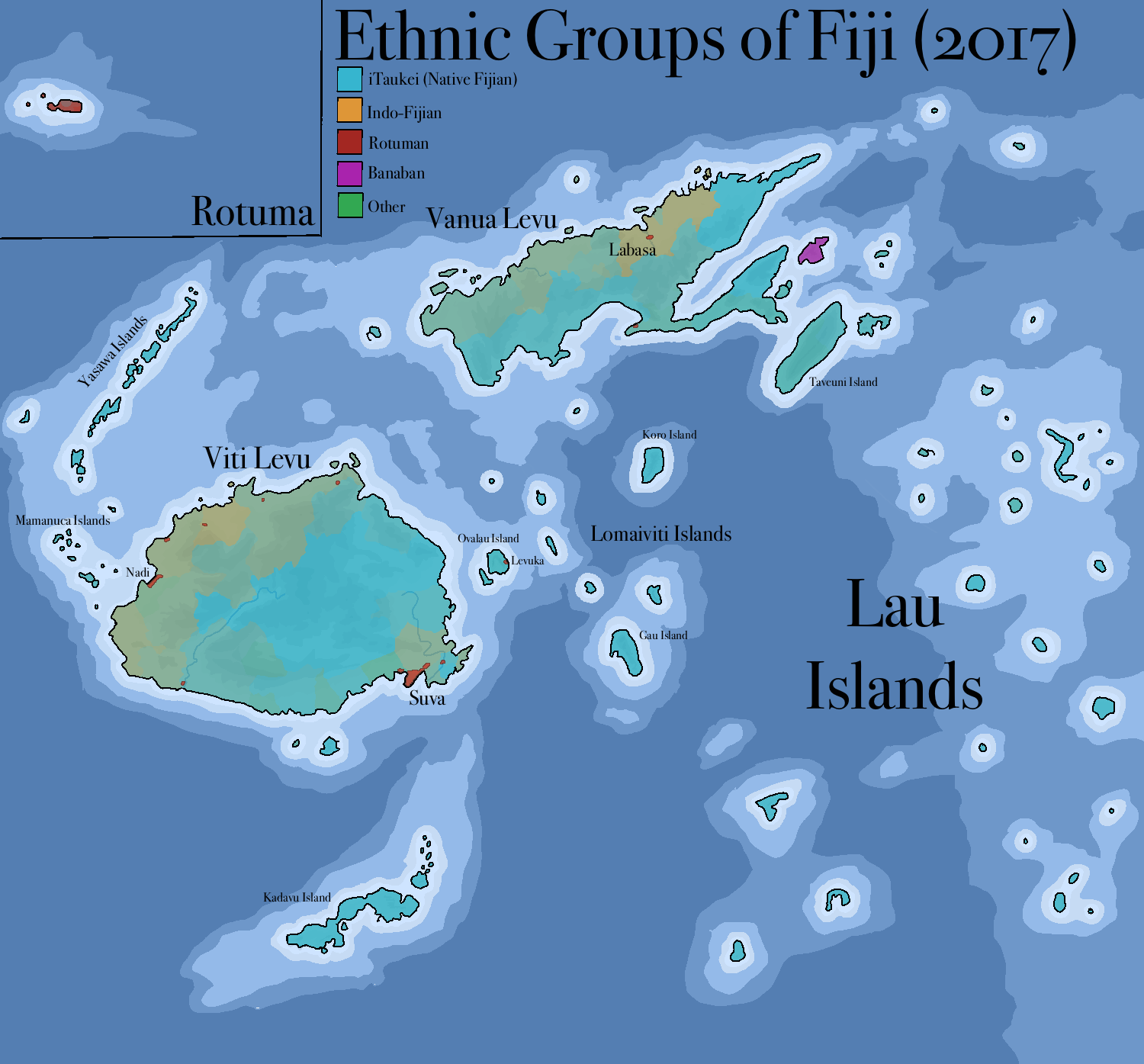
- Fiji ethnic map (2017 census) green is for Fijian

A Fijian speaker, recorded in Fiji

Fijian (Na vosa vaka-Viti) is an Austronesian language of the Malayo-Polynesian family spoken by some 350,000–450,000 ethnic Fijians as a native language. In the 2013 constitution, Fijian (referred to as iTaukei) is a national language of Fiji, along with English and Fiji Hindi. Fijian is a VOS language.

Standard Fijian is based on the Bau dialect, which is an East Fijian language. A pidginized form is used by many Indo-Fijians and Chinese on the islands, while Pidgin Hindustani is used by many rural ethnic Fijians and Chinese in areas dominated by Indo-Fijians.

== History ==
=== History of the language ===
The history of Fijian Language dates back to the early settlement of Fiji Islands, approximately 3,500 years ago. Over the centuries, the indigenous languages developed its regional variations, reflecting the geographical separation of communities and contact with the other groups. These varieties are also known as communalects and it forms part of the Central Pacific subgroup of the Oceanic branch of Austronesian language family.

=== Polynesian relationship and influence on Fijian ===
Linguistic research on the relationship between the Fijian and Polynesian languages shows that they are not simply a case of one borrowing from the other. Instead, they are part of the same language subgroup, the Central Pacific branch of the Austronesian language family, sharing a common ancestor. This means that a large portion of their shared vocabulary consists of cognates—words with a common origin since the vast majority of similarities come from this shared linguistic heritage. However, it is also true that some words from Polynesia have been adopted into Fijian especially from Tonga, particularly in the eastern dialects.

=== National language debate ===
In May and June 2005, several prominent Fijians sought to promote the status of the Fijian language. Fiji had no official language before the 1997 Constitution, which made the Fijian language co-official with English and Fiji Hindi; however, it was not required to be taught in schools. The minister of education, Ro Teimumu Kepa, has also supported appeals to Chairman of the Great Council of Chiefs Ratu Ovini Bokini. Similar appeals have been made by Misiwini Qereqeretabua, Director of the Institute of Language and Culture, and by Apolonia Tamata, a linguistics professor at the University of the South Pacific in Suva. They have stated that recognition of the Fijian language is essential for the basic identity of the nation and acts as a unifying factor for the multicultural society of Fiji.

Mahendra Chaudhry, the leader of the Fiji Labour Party, also supported the cause to make Fijian a national language and a compulsory subject in schools with the same status as Fiji Hindi, a position echoed by Krishna Vilas of the National Reconciliation Committee.

Since 2013, when a new constitution was adopted, Fijian is established as an official language of Fiji alongside Fiji Hindi and English.

== Phonology ==
The consonant phonemes of Fijian are as shown in the following table:

Fijian consonant phonemes
		Labial	Coronal	Palatal	Velar	Glottal
Nasal		m	n		ŋ	
Plosive	voiceless	(p)	t	(tʃ)	k	(ʔ)
Plosive	prenasalized	ᵐb	ⁿd	(ⁿdʒ)	ᵑɡ	
Fricative	voiceless	(f)	s		(x)	(h)
Fricative	voiced	β	ð			
Trill	plain		r			
Trill	prenasalized		ᶯɖʳ			
Approximant		w	l	j		

The consonant written ⟨dr⟩ has been described as a prenasalized trill [ⁿr] or trilled affricate [ⁿdr]. However, it is only rarely pronounced with a trilled release; the primary feature distinguishing it from ⟨d⟩ is that it is postalveolar, [ɳɖ], rather than dental/alveolar.

The sounds [p] and [f] occur only in loanwords from other languages. The sounds [x] and [h] only occur for speakers from certain regions of the country.

The sounds [tʃ] and [ⁿdʒ] occur as allophones of /t/ and /ⁿd/.

The glottal stop /ʔ/ occurs in the Boumaa Fijian used to illustrate this article, but is not found in the standard language. It descends from an earlier /k/ sound in most Fijian dialects.

Note the difference in place of articulation between the voiced-voiceless fricative pairs: bilabial [β] vs. labiodental [f], and dental [ð] vs. alveolar [s].

The vowel phonemes are:

Monophthongs
	Front		Central		Back	
	short	long	short	long	short	long
Close	i	iː			u	uː
Mid	e	eː			o	oː
Open			a	aː		

Falling diphthongs
		Second component	
		/i/	/u/
First component	/e/	ei̯	eu̯
First component	/o/	oi̯	ou̯
First component	/a/	ai̯	au̯

In addition, there is the rising diphthong /i̯u/.

Syllables can consist of a consonant followed by a vowel (CV) or a single vowel (V). Word stress is based on moras: a short vowel is one mora, diphthongs and long vowels are two morae. Primary stress is on the penultimate mora of the phonological word. That is, if the last syllable of a word is short, then the penultimate syllable will be stressed, while if the last syllable contains either a long vowel or a diphthong, then it receives primary stress. Stress is not lexical and can shift when suffixes are attached to the root. Examples:

- Stress on the penultimate syllable (final short vowel): síga, 'day';
- Stress on the final syllable (diphthong): cauravóu, 'youth' (the stress extends over the whole diphthong).
- Stress shift: cábe, 'kick' → cabé-ta, 'kick-TR'

== Orthography ==
The Fijian alphabet is based on the Latin script and consists of the following letters. There is almost a one-to-one correspondence between letters and phonemes.

Alphabet
Capital	Lowercase	IPA	Others
A	a	[a]	
B	b	[ᵐb]	
C	c	[ð]	
D	d	[ⁿd]	di [ⁿdʒi]
E	e	[ɛ]~[e]	
F	f	[f]	
G	g	[ŋ]	
H	h	[h]~[x]	
I	i	[i]	
J	j	[tʃ]~[ⁿdʒ]	
K	k	[k]	
L	l	[l]	
M	m	[m]	
N	n	[n]	nr [ᶯɖ]
O	o	[ɔ]~[o]	
P	p	[p]	
Q	q	[ᵑɡ]	
R	r	[r]	
S	s	[s]	
T	t	[t]	ti [tʃi]
U	u	[u]	
V	v	[β]	
W	w	[ɰ]	
Y	y	[j]~[∅]	
Z	z	[ⁿdʒ]	

In the 1980s, scholars compiling a dictionary added several more consonants and a few consonant clusters to the alphabet. These newcomers were necessary to handle words entering Standard Fijian from not only English, but from other Fijian languages or dialects as well. These are the most important additions: ⟨z⟩ [ⁿdʒ], as in ⟨ziza⟩ 'ginger' and ⟨h⟩ [h], as in ⟨haya⟩ 'hire'.

For phonological reasons ⟨ti⟩ and ⟨di⟩ are pronounced [tʃi], [ⁿdʒi] rather than [ti], [ⁿdi] (cf. Japanese chi kana, or in standard Brazilian Portuguese). Hence, the Fijian name for Fiji, ⟨Viti⟩, from an allophonic pronunciation of [βitʃi] as [ɸidʒi].

In addition, the digraph ⟨dr⟩ stands for retroflex [ᶯɖ], or a prenasalized trill [^{ɳɖ}r] in careful pronunciation, or more commonly for some people and in some dialects.

The vowel letters ⟨a e i o u⟩ have roughly their IPA values, [a ɛ~e i ɔ~o u]. The vowel length contrast is not usually indicated in writing, except in dictionaries and textbooks for learners of the language, where it is indicated by a macron over the vowel in question; Dixon, in the work cited below, doubles all long vowels in his spelling system. Diphthongs are ⟨ai au ei eu oi ou iu⟩, pronounced [ɛi̯ ɔu̯ ei̯ eu̯ oi̯ ou̯ i̯u].

== Morpho-syntax ==
Note: the examples in this section are from Bouma dialect. It is not Standard Fijian, which is based on the Bauan dialect.

=== Negation ===
In order to negate a phrase or clause in Fijian, certain verbs are used to create this distinction. These verbs of negation are known as semi-auxiliary verbs. Semi-auxiliary verbs fulfil the functions of main verbs (in terms of syntactic form and pattern) and have a NP or complement clause as their subject (complements clauses within negation are introduced by relators ni (which refers to an event, which is generally a non-specific unit) or me (which refers is translated as "should", referring to the event within the complement clause should occur)). Within a complement clause, the semi-auxiliary verb qualifies the predicate.

==== Semi-auxiliary verbs ====
One semi-auxiliary verb used to express negation in Fijian is sega. This semi-auxiliary can be translated as either "there are no-" or "it is not the case that", depending on the subject it relates to. In terms of numerical expression, sega is also used to express the quantity "none". This negator can be used in almost all situations, with the exception of the imperative or in me (classifier) clauses. When sega takes a NP as its subject, the meaning "there are no-" is assumed:

e sega a kolii (i+na koro yai)
3SG not ART dog in+ART village this
"there are no dogs (in this village)"

Predicate clauses can also be negated in Fijian with the semi-auxiliary verb sega. This can only be completed when the predicate is placed into a complement clause. The subject of sega must also be ni, which introduces the complement clause. It is then translated as "it is not the case that (predicate clause)". An example of this construction is shown here:

e sega [ni lako o Jone]
3SG not that go ART John
"John is not going (lit: it is not the case that John is going)"

Hence, the only way a verb (which is generally the head of a predicate phrase) can be negated in Fijian is when it forms part of the [e sega ni VERB] construction. However, in Fijian the head of a predicate phrase may belong to almost any word class. If another word (e.g. a noun) is used, the structure of negation alters. This distinction can be shown through diverse examples of the negating NPs in Fijian. The below examples show the difference between a noun as the head of a NP and a noun as the head of a predicate in a complement clause, within negation:

NP as subject of sega

e sega a kolii
3SG not ART dog
"there is no dog"

Ni as the subject of sega

e sega ni kolii
3SG not that dog
"it isn't a dog (it may be a cat)"

Additionally, sega can also work with relator se which introduces interrogative clauses. This combination creates a form translatable as "or not":

au tovele-a se kana vinaka a kaa kana yai {(se sega)}
1SG test-TR whether eat good ART thing eat this {(or not)}
"I'll test whether this food tastes good or not"

Another common negator is ꞌua or waaꞌua, which is translatable as "don't, not". Differently to sega, this semi-auxiliary verb is used for imperatives and in me clauses. Therefore, these semi-auxiliaries are fixed, and cannot be used interchangeably. ꞌUa and waaꞌua have the same meaning, however waaꞌua may be more intense; in most instances either semi-auxiliary verb can be used. ꞌua ~ waaꞌua can take a NP as its subject, but most commonly takes the ni complement as a subject, which is demonstrated below:

e aa taqo.-makini au o Jone me+u kua ni lau-.vacu
3SG PAST defend-TR 1SG ART Person should+1SG not that PASS-punch
"John defended me from being punched (lit: that I should not be punched)"

An example of ꞌua ~ waaꞌua used in imperative structure can be seen here:

au saa vei-.vutuni.-takina sara me+u saa waakua ni vaka-.yaco-ra tale a caka.caka yai i+na siga.tabu
1SG ASP repent-TR MODIF should+1SG ASP not INT make-happen-TR again ART REDUP-do INT on+ART Sunday
"I repented (of hunting pigs on the sabbath) so that I won't ever again do this activity on Sunday"

In the case of pronouns, they can only be negated when they form part of the NP, when acting as the predicate head. Therefore, pronouns cannot be the NP subject of semi-auxiliary verbs sega or ꞌua ~ waaꞌua in the way that general nouns can.

===== Combining semi-auxiliary verbs =====
Sega and ꞌua ~ waaꞌua can be combined with other auxiliary verbs to produce diverse constructions. Both sega and ꞌua ~ waaꞌua can connect with semi-auxiliary rawa 'can' to negate the concept of possibility which is attached to the verb 'can' (resulting in constructions such as 'can't' and 'shouldn't').

==== Modifiers in negation ====
Two main modifiers, soti 'a lot' and sara 'very; (go) right on, immediately' play key roles in negation in Fijian, and work in conjunction with semi-auxiliary verbs. Soti is added after negators sega and ꞌua ~ waaꞌua, and functions as an intensity marker. The construction sega soti is translatable as 'not a lot of, not very'. The sega soti construction requires an adjective (or an adverb which results from an adjective), and must take ni (complement clause) as its subject in order to function. Soti can be found in position immediately after sega, but may also be found after the ni relator without changing the meaning of the phrase. The primary construction is shown below:

au sega soti ni vuꞌu me tautauvata ꞌei Sepo
1SG not INT SUB clever should same with Person
"I'm not as clever as Sepo (lit: I am not clever, to be the same as Sepo)"

Similarly, to soti, the modifier sara 'very; (go) right on, immediately' can also be used in conjunction with sega and ꞌua ~ waaꞌua. This combination is used to stress the negative sense and aspect of a phrase.

ꞌua ni laꞌi taaoo tale i Viidawa, laꞌo sara i ꞌOrovou!
don't INT go held-up again AT Viidawa go INT to ꞌOrovou
"don't get held up at Viidawa (a place en route, where there may be some enticing event in progress), go straight on to ꞌOrovou!"

=== Pronouns and person markers ===
The pronominal system of Fijian is remarkably rich. Like many other languages, it recognises three persons; first person (speaker), second person (addressee), and third person (all other). There is no distinction between human, non-human, animate, or inanimate. Four numbers are represented; singular, dual, paucal, and plural—'paucal' refers to more than two people who have some relationship, as a family or work group; if none, 'plural' is used. Like many other Oceanic languages, Fijian pronouns are marked for number and clusivity.

Bouma Fijian pronouns
Person		Number			
Person		singular	dual	paucal	plural
1INCL	subject		(e)taru	tou	(e)ta
1INCL	object		ꞌeetaru	ꞌetatou	ꞌeta
1INCL	cardinal		ꞌeetaru	ꞌetatou	ꞌeta
1EXCL	subject	au ~ u	ꞌeirau	ꞌeitou	ꞌeimami
1EXCL	object	au	ꞌeirau	ꞌeitou	ꞌeimami
1EXCL	cardinal	yau	ꞌeirau	ꞌeitou	ꞌeimami
2	subject	o	(o)mudrau ~ (o)drau	(o)mudou ~ (o)dou	(o)munuu ~ (o)nuu
2	object	iꞌo	ꞌemudrau	ꞌemudou	ꞌemunuu
2	cardinal	iꞌo	ꞌemudrau	ꞌemudou	ꞌemunuu
3	subject	e	(e)rau	(e)ratou	(e)ra
3	object	ꞌea	rau	iratou	ira
3	cardinal	ꞌea	(i)rau	(i)ratou	(i)ra

==== Forms and function ====
Each pronoun can have five forms, but some person-number combinations may have the same form for more than one function, as can be seen in the table above.

The forms are:

Cardinal – used when a pronoun occurs as the head of a NP. A cardinal pronoun is usually preceded by the proper article o, except when preceded by a preposition:

era sa laꞌo [o ira]
3PL ASP go ART 3PL
"They are going" (2)[24]

au aa soli-a [a niu] [vei ira]
1SG PAST give-TR ART coconut PREP 3PL
"I gave [the coconut] [to them]"

Subject – the first constituent of a predicate, acts as person marking. Examples can be seen in examples (1) and (2) above: era and au, and (3) below: o

Object – follows the -i-final form of a transitive verb:

o aa biu-ti ira
2SG PAST leave-TR 3PL
"You left them"

Possessive suffix – attaches to inalienable nouns, and

Possessive – precedes the NP head of the 'possessed' constituent in a possessive construction.

(For more information on the form and function of these possessive pronouns, see Possession.)

==== Use ====
The major clausal structure in Fijian minimally includes a predicate, which usually has a verb at its head. The initial element in the predicate is the subject form pronoun:

au laꞌo
1SG go
"I am going"

era laꞌo
3PL go
"They are going"

This 'subject marker + verb' predicate construction is obligatory, every other constituent is optional. The subject may be expanded upon by an NP following the predicate:

era laꞌo [a gone]
3PL go ART child
"[the children] are going" or "They [the children] are going"

The subject pronoun constituent of a predicate acts mainly as a person marker.

Fijian is a verb–object–subject language, and the subject pronoun may be translated as its equivalent in English, the subject NP of a clause in Fijian follows the verb and the object if it is included.

The social use of pronouns is largely driven by respect and hierarchy. Each of the non-singular second person pronouns can be used for a singular addressee. For example, if one's actual or potential in-laws are addressed, the 2DU pronoun should be used. Similarly, when a brother or sister of the opposite sex is addressed, the 2PA pronoun should be used, and it can also be used for same-sex siblings when the speaker wishes to show respect. The 2PL pronoun can be used to show respect to elders, particularly the village chief.

=== Possession ===
Possession is a grammatical term for a special relationship between two entities: a "possessor" and a "possessed". The relationship may be one of legal ownership, but in Fijian, like many other Austronesian languages, it is often much broader, encompassing kin relations, body parts, parts of an inanimate whole and personal qualities and concepts such as control, association and belonging.

Fijian has a complex system of possessive constructions, depending on the nature of the possessor and of the possessed. Choosing the appropriate structure depends on knowing whether the possessor is a personal or place name, a pronoun, or a common noun (with human or non-human, animate or inanimate reference), and also on whether the possessed is a free or bound noun.

==== Possessor ====
Only an animate noun may be a possessor in the true possessive constructions shown below, with possession marked on the possessed NP in a number of ways. For personal and place name possessors, the possessive construction may be made by affixing the possessive suffix –i to the possessed noun, bound or free. If the possessor is a pronoun, the possessed noun must be marked by one of the pronominal markers which specify person, number and inclusivity/exclusivity (see table). If the possessor is inanimate, the possessive particle ni is usually placed between the possessed NP and the possessor NP. The particle ni then indicates association, rather than formal possession, but the construction is still regarded as a possessive construction.

==== Possessed ====
Free nouns can stand alone and need no affix; most nouns in Fijian fall into this class. Bound nouns require a suffix to complete them and are written ending in a hyphen to indicate this requirement. Tama- 'father' and tina- 'mother' are examples of bound nouns. The classes of free and bound nouns roughly correspond with the concept, common in Austronesian languages, of alienable and inalienable possession, respectively. Alienable possession denotes a relationship in which the thing possessed is not culturally considered an inherent part of the possessor, and inalienable possession indicates a relationship in which the possessed is regarded as an intrinsic part of the possessor.

Body parts and kin relations are typical examples of inalienable possession. Inanimate objects are typical examples of alienable possession.

The alienable nature of free nouns is further marked by prefixes, known as classifiers, indicating certain other characteristics. Some common examples are me- when the possessed noun is something drinkable, ke- (or ꞌe) when the noun is something edible and we- when the referent of the possessed noun is personal property.

Fijian possessive pronominal suffix markers
		Single	Dual	Paucal	Plural
1st person	exclusive	-qu	-irau	-itou	-imami
1st person	inclusive	-qu	-daru	-datou	-da
2nd person		-mu	-mudrau	-mudou	-muni
3rd person		-na	-drau	-dratou	-dra

==== Possessive constructions ====
The word order of a possessive construction for all except inanimate possessors is possessed NP-classifier(CLF) + possessive marker (POSS) + possessor NP. For an inanimate possessor, the word order is possessed NP + ni + possessor NP.

	POSSESSED	POSSESSED
POSSESSOR	bound noun	free noun
personal/place name	suffix -i (example 1)	classifier plus suffix -i; or suffix -i (example 2)
pronoun	pronominal suffix; or suffix -i (example 3a, b)	classifier plus possessor pronoun (example 4a, b)
human noun	pronominal suffix, expanded by post-head possessor NP; or suffix -i; or NP ni NP (example 5)	classifier plus possessor pronoun, expanded by post-head possessor NP (example 6)
animate noun	NP ni NP; or pronominal suffix, expanded by post-head possessor NP	NP ni NP; or classifier plus possessor pronoun, expanded by post-head possessor NP
inanimate noun	NP ni NP (example 7, 8)	NP ni NP (example 7, 8)

Note that there is some degree of flexibility in the use of possessive constructions as described in this table.

==== Examples ====
a liga-i Paula
ART hand-POSS Paula
"Paula's hand"

a waqona me-i Paula
ART kava CLF.drink-POSS Paula
"Paula's kava"

a tama-mudrau
ART father-PN.2DU
"The father of you two"

a liga-qu
ART hand-PN.1SG
"My hand"

a me-na ti
ART CLF.drink-POSS.PN.3SG tea
"His / her tea"

a ꞌe-mu uvi
ART CLF.eat-POSS-PN.2SG yam
"Your (SG) yam (for eating)."

a liga-na
ART hand-PN.3SG
His / her hand

a we-irau waqa o yau ei Jone
ART CLF.property-POSS.PN.1DU boat ART I and John
John's and my boat (thing owned).

na yaca ni waqa
ART name POSS.PTCP boat
The name of the boat (The name associated with the boat)

a vale ni kana
ART house POSS.PTCP eat

== Syntax ==
The normal Fijian word order is VOS (verb–object–subject):

E rai-c-a na no-na motoka {o Jone.}
3SG-SUB see-TR-3SG-OBJ the 3SG-POSS car John.
John sees his car.

== Sample phrases ==
=== Greetings ===
Below are some examples of Fijian greetings.

Fijian	English	IPA
Au domoni iko.	I love you.	[ɔu̯ ⁿdo.mo.ni i.ko]
bula	hello (literally "life")	[ᵐbu.la]
io	yes	[io]
kerekere	please	[ke.re.ke.re]
moce	goodbye	[mo.ðe]
ni sa bula [vinaka]	hello (formal), welcome	[ni sa ᵐbu.la]
sega	no	[se.ŋa]
sega na leqa	no worries	[se.ŋa na le.ᵑɡa]
sota tale	see you later	[so.ta ta.le]
Vacava tiko?	How are you?	[βa.ða.βa ti.ko]
vinaka	thank you	[βi.na.ka]
yadra	good morning	[ja.ɳɖʳa]

== National language debate ==
In May and June 2005, a number of prominent Fiji Islanders called for the status of Fijian to be upgraded. It was not an official language before the adoption of the 1997 Constitution, which made it co-official with English and Fiji Hindi. It is still not a compulsory subject in schools, but then Education Minister, Ro Teimumu Kepa, had endorsed calls for that to change, as had the former Great Council of Chiefs Chairman Ratu Ovini Bokini. Similar calls also came from Misiwini Qereqeretabua, the former Director of the Institute of Fijian Language and Culture, and from Apolonia Tamata, a linguistics lecturer at Suva's University of the South Pacific, both of whom said that recognition of the Fijian language is essential to the nation's basic identity and as a unifying factor in Fiji's multicultural society.

The Fiji Labour Party leader Mahendra Chaudhry also endorsed the call for Fijian to be made a national language and a compulsory school subject if the same status was given to Fiji Hindi, a position that was echoed by Krishna Vilas of the National Reconciliation Committee.

== Sample text ==
Article 1 of the Universal Declaration of Human Rights in Fijian:

Era sucu ena galala na tamata yadua, era tautauvata ena nodra dokai kei na nodra dodonu. E tiko na nodra vakasama kei na nodra lewaeloma, sa dodonu mera veidokadokai ena yalo ni veitacini.

Article 1 of the Universal Declaration of Human Rights in English:

All human beings are born free and equal in dignity and rights. They are endowed with reason and conscience and should act towards one another in a spirit of brotherhood.

== See also ==
- East Fijian languages
- Languages of Fiji
- West Fijian languages

== Sources ==
- Dixon, R. M. W. (1988). A Grammar of Boumaa Fijian. Chicago: University of Chicago Press. ISBN 0-226-15428-9.
- Schütz, Albert J. (1985). The Fijian Language. Honolulu: University of Hawaii Press. ISBN 0-8248-1005-8.
- Schütz, Albert J. (2003). Say it in Fijian: an entertaining introduction to the standard language of Fiji. Textbook Wholesalers. ISBN 1862730385. OCLC 156199054.
