= Central Pacific languages =

Branch of the Oceanic languages

Central Pacific
- Fijian–Polynesian
- Geographic distribution: Fiji and Polynesia
- Linguistic classification: Austronesian: Malayo-Polynesian; Oceanic; Central–Eastern Oceanic; Central Pacific
- Proto-language: Proto-Central Pacific
- Subdivisions: West Fijian – Rotuman; East Fijian – Polynesian

Language codes
- Glottolog: cent2060
- The Central Pacific languages Pink is Western Fijian – Rotuman; ocher East Fijian – Polynesian (not shown: Rapa Nui)

The Central Pacific languages, also known as Fijian–Polynesian languages, are a branch of the Oceanic languages spoken in Fiji and Polynesia.

== Classification ==
Lynch et al. (2011) classify the languages as a linkage.

- Central Pacific
  - Western
    - Rotuman
    - Western Fijian linkage
      - Namosi-Naitasiri-Serua
      - Western Fijian (Nadroga, Waya)
  - East Central Pacific linkage
    - Eastern Fijian linkage
      - Bauan (standard Fijian)
      - Gone Dau
      - Lauan
      - Lomaiviti
    - Polynesian family

The West Fijian languages are more closely related to Rotuman, and East Fijian to Polynesian, than they are to each other, but subsequent contact has caused them to reconverge. Rotuman has been influenced by Polynesian languages, evident today by the presence of two reflex sets (one inherited, one from Polynesian).
