= Oceanic languages =

Subgroup of the Austronesian language family

Oceanic
- Geographic distribution: Oceania: (Melanesia; Micronesia; Polynesia)
- Linguistic classification: Austronesian: Malayo-Polynesian; Central–Eastern Malayo-Polynesian; Eastern Malayo-Polynesian; Oceanic
- Proto-language: Proto-Oceanic
- Subdivisions: Admiralty Islands–Yapese; St Matthias Islands; Western Oceanic; Temotu; Central–Eastern Oceanic

Language codes
- Glottolog: ocea1241
- The branches of Oceanic (The bottom four could be grouped under one branch, Central–Eastern Oceanic) Admiralties and Yapese St Matthias Western Oceanic Temotu Southeast Solomons Southern Oceanic Micronesian Fijian–Polynesian The black ovals at the northwestern limit of Micronesia are the non-Oceanic Malayo-Polynesian languages Palauan and Chamorro. The black circles inside the green circles are offshore Papuan languages.

The Oceanic languages are a branch of the Austronesian languages comprising some 450 languages spoken in Polynesia, Micronesia and Melanesia. Though covering a vast area, Oceanic languages are estimated to have only two million native speakers. The largest individual Oceanic languages are Eastern Fijian with over 600,000 speakers, and Samoan with an estimated 400,000 speakers. The Gilbertese (Kiribati), Tongan, Tahitian, Māori and Tolai (Gazelle Peninsula) languages each have over 100,000 speakers. The common ancestor which is reconstructed for this group of languages is called Proto-Oceanic (abbr. "POc").

== Classification ==
The Oceanic languages were first shown to be a language family by Sidney Herbert Ray in 1896 and, besides Malayo-Polynesian, they are the only established large branch of Austronesian languages. Grammatically, they have been strongly influenced by the Papuan languages of northern New Guinea, but they retain a remarkably large amount of Austronesian vocabulary.

=== Lynch, Ross, & Crowley (2002) ===
According to John Lynch, Malcolm Ross, and Terry Crowley's 2002 book The Oceanic Languages, Oceanic languages often form linkages with each other. Linkages are formed when languages emerged historically from an earlier dialect continuum. The linguistic innovations shared by adjacent languages define a chain of intersecting subgroups (a linkage), for which no distinct proto-language can be reconstructed.

Lynch, Ross, & Crowley (2002) propose three primary groups of Oceanic languages:

- Oceanic
  - Admiralties linkage: languages of Manus Island, its offshore islands, and small islands to the west.
  - Western Oceanic (WOc) linkage: languages of the north coast of Irian Jaya (Western New Guinea), Papua New Guinea (excluding the Admiralties) and the western Solomon Islands. West Oceanic is made up of three or four sub-linkages and families:
    - ? Sarmi–Jayapura linkage: maybe part of the North New Guinea linkage?
    - North New Guinea linkage: consists of languages of the north coast of New Guinea, east from Jayapura.
    - Meso-Melanesian linkage: consists of languages of the Bismarck Archipelago and Solomon Islands.
    - Papuan Tip linkage: consists of languages of the tip of the Papuan Peninsula.
  - Central–Eastern Oceanic (CEOc) linkage: nearly all languages of Oceania not included in the Admiralties and Western Oceanic. Central–Eastern consists of four or five subgroups:
    - Southeast Solomonic linkage: of the South East Solomon Islands.
    - (Utupua–Vanikoro linkage: later removed to Temotu languages).
    - Southern Oceanic linkage: consists of languages of New Caledonia and Vanuatu.
    - Central Oceanic linkage: consists of the Polynesian languages, and the languages of Fiji.
    - Micronesian linkage.

The "residues" (as they are called by Lynch, Ross, & Crowley), which do not fit into the three groups above, but are still classified as Oceanic are:

  - St. Matthias Islands linkage.
  - ? Yapese language: of the island of Yap. Perhaps part of the Admiralties?

Ross & Næss (2007) removed Utupua–Vanikoro, from Central–Eastern Oceanic, to a new primary branch of Oceanic:

- Temotu linkage, named after the Temotu Province of the Solomon Islands.

Blench (2014) considers Utupua and Vanikoro to be two separate branches that are both non-Austronesian.

=== Ross, Pawley, & Osmond (2016) ===
Ross, Pawley, & Osmond (2016) propose the following revised rake-like classification of Oceanic, with 9 primary branches.

- Oceanic
  - Yapese language
  - Admiralty languages
  - St Matthias languages (Mussau and Tench)
  - Western Oceanic linkage
    - Meso-Melanesian linkage
    - New Guinea Oceanic linkage
      - North New Guinea linkage
      - Papuan Tip languages
  - Temotu languages
  - Southeast Solomonic languages
  - Southern Oceanic linkage
    - North Vanuatu linkage
    - Nuclear Southern Oceanic linkage
      - Central Vanuatu linkage
      - South Vanuatu languages
      - Loyalties-New Caledonia languages
  - Micronesian languages
  - Central Pacific languages
    - Western Central Pacific linkage
      - Rotuman language
      - Western Fijian languages
    - Eastern Central Pacific linkage
      - Eastern Fijian languages
      - Polynesian languages

== Non-Austronesian languages ==
Roger Blench (2014) argues that many languages conventionally classified as Oceanic are in fact non-Austronesian (or "Papuan", which is a geographic rather than genetic grouping), including Utupua and Vanikoro. Blench doubts that Utupua and Vanikoro are closely related, and thus should not be grouped together. Since each of the three Utupua and three Vanikoro languages are highly distinct from each other, Blench doubts that these languages had diversified on the islands of Utupua and Vanikoro, but had rather migrated to the islands from elsewhere. According to him, historically this was due to the Lapita demographic expansion consisting of both Austronesian and non-Austronesian settlers migrating from the Lapita homeland in the Bismarck Archipelago to various islands further to the east.

Other languages traditionally classified as Oceanic that Blench (2014) suspects are in fact non-Austronesian include the Kaulong language of West New Britain, which has a Proto-Malayo-Polynesian vocabulary retention rate of only 5%, and languages of the Loyalty Islands that are spoken just to the north of New Caledonia.

Blench (2014) proposes that languages classified as:

- Austronesian, but perhaps actually non-Austronesian are spoken in northern Vanuatu and southern Vanuatu (North Vanuatu languages and South Vanuatu languages).
- Austronesian, but may have experienced bilingualism with non-Austronesian are spoken in central Vanuatu and New Caledonia (Central Vanuatu languages and New Caledonian languages).
- non-Austronesian, with some other languages traditionally classified as Austronesian may perhaps actually be non-Austronesian are spoken in the Solomon Islands and New Britain (various Meso-Melanesian languages).

== Word order ==
Word order in Oceanic languages is highly diverse, and is distributed in the following geographic regions (Lynch, Ross, & Crowley 2002:49).

- Subject–verb–object: Admiralty Islands, most of Markham Valley, Siasi Islands, most of New Britain, New Ireland, some parts of Bougainville Island, most parts of the southeast Solomon Islands, most parts of Vanuatu, some parts of New Caledonia, most of Micronesia
- Subject–object–verb: central and southeast Papua New Guinea, some parts of Markham Valley, Madang coast, Wewak coast, Sarmi coast, a few parts of Bougainville, some parts of New Britain
- Verb–subject–object: New Georgia, some parts of Santa Ysabel Island, much of Polynesia, Yap
- Verb–object–subject: Fijian language, Anejom language, Loyalty Islands, Kiribati, many parts of New Caledonia, Nggela
- Object-initial: only two, Äiwoo (object-verb-subject) and Tobati (object-subject-verb)
- Topic-prominent language: much of Bougainville Island, Choiseul Island, some parts of Santa Ysabel Island

== See also ==
- Wave model of language change
- Remote Oceanic languages

== Bibliography ==
- Ray, Sidney H. (1896). "The common origin of the Oceanic languages". Journal of the Polynesian Society. 5 (1): 58–68. JSTOR 20701407.
- Lynch, John; Ross, Malcolm; Crowley, Terry (2002). The Oceanic Languages. Richmond, Surrey: Curzon. ISBN 978-0-7007-1128-4. OCLC 48929366.
- Ross, Malcolm and Åshild Næss (2007). "An Oceanic Origin for Äiwoo, the Language of the Reef Islands?". Oceanic Linguistics. 46 (2): 456–498. doi:10.1353/ol.2008.0003. hdl:1885/20053.
